= Judge Joe Brown =

American reality court show (1998–2013)

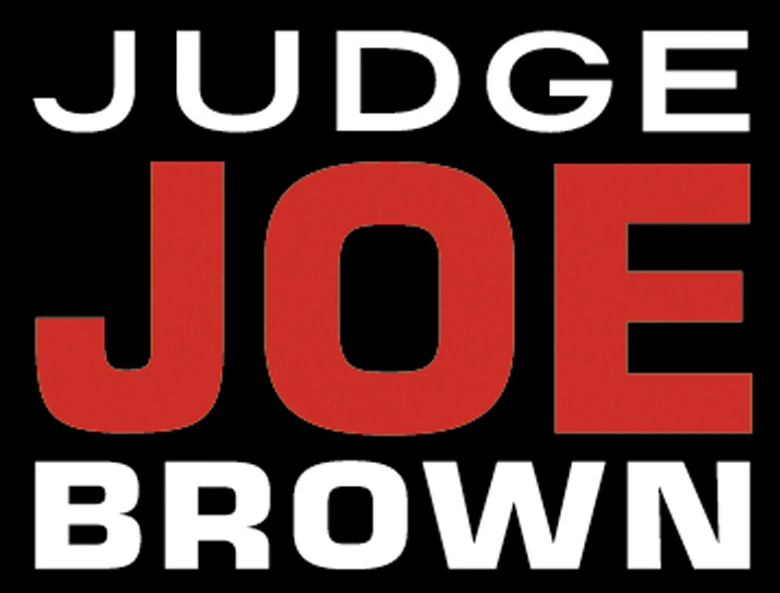
- Genre: Arbitration-based reality court show
- Starring: Judge Joe Brown; Holly Evans (1998–2006); Jacque Kessler (1998–2010); Sonia Montejano (2006–2013); Jeanne Zelasko (2010–2013)
- Narrated by: Ben Patrick Johnson (1998–2005); Rolonda Watts (2005–2013)
- Theme music composer: John Nordstrom
- Country of origin: United States
- Original language: English
- No. of seasons: 15
- No. of episodes: 3,000+

Production
- Production locations: Sunset Bronson Studios; Hollywood, California
- Running time: 22 minutes
- Production company: Big Ticket Television

Original release
- Network: First-run syndication
- Release: September 14, 1998 – May 22, 2013

Judge Joe Brown is an American arbitration-based reality court show starring former Shelby County, Tennessee criminal court judge Joseph B. Brown. The series aired from September 14, 1998, to May 22, 2013. Joe Brown was the second highest paid daytime television personality behind Judge Judy during the time the show was running.

During the entirety of its series run, Brown was the longest serving African American television arbitrator; this record is now held by Greg Mathis of Judge Mathis, which premiered the year after Brown's program in 1999 and ran for 24 seasons through 2023.

== Production history ==
Judge Joe Brown is the first African-American man to preside over a courtroom television show and the first African-American person to preside over a long-running courtroom series. However, former New York prosecutor Star Jones is the first African-American person to preside over a court show (Jones & Jury 1994–1995).

With all of its seasons having aired consecutively, solely under Judge Joe, Judge Joe Brown was the second longest running television jurist for many years prior to his resignation, just behind Judge Judy Sheindlin. While there are court shows that outnumber both Judge Joe Brown and Judge Judy in seasons within the judicial arena, namely Divorce Court and The People's Court, they are also programs with multiple lives and multiple "judges" in their histories.

The set of Judge Joe Brown was directly beside the set of Judge Judy within the same facility, Sunset Bronson Studios. After Judge Joe Brown's 2013 cancellation, however, the space was used for the courtroom series Paternity Court for a season (2013–14), followed by the court show created and produced by Judge Judy Sheindlin, Hot Bench (2014–present). Like Judge Judy was for the entirety of its 25-year run, Judge Joe Brown was both produced by Big Ticket Television and syndicated by CBS Television Distribution (CTD), the successor company to their previous distributors: Worldvision Enterprises, Paramount Domestic Television, and CBS Paramount Domestic Television.

Like the majority of television court shows, Judge Joe Brown is a form of binding arbitration. The show's producers maintain the appearance of a civil courtroom.

Judge Joe Brown ran in first-run syndication and entered into its 15th and final season on September 10, 2012, also regularly airing in high-definition for the first time beginning in that same season as well.

The show was syndicated in the United States and aired during daytime hours. Reruns aired weekday mornings on Bounce TV from 2018 to 2021. It aired on CTV in Canada and Fox8 in Australia. The show then began streaming on Pluto TV for the earlier seasons and The Roku Channel for the later seasons until around 2023 when the show was removed from both streaming services, however the show returned to The Roku Channel in late 2024.

=== Ratings ===
As far as ratings in the legal/courtroom genre go, Brown's program ranked in second place during its entire run, typically just above The People's Court and significantly below Judge Judy. Consequently, Judge Joe Brown was the highest rated male-arbitrated television series during its run.

== Adjudicating approach ==
According to Roger M. Grace, editor of the Metropolitan News-Enterprise, for the most part, Brown had a languid and perfunctory nature about him, particularly while gathering all the facts and trying to figure out the case. Occasionally, however, once he suspected a party of being guilty, Brown had become particularly cantankerous as shown in his irritated, quarrelsome communication. Brown had also subjected these litigants to harsh tirades and judgmental commentary. At several intervals throughout many of the cases, Brown had been seen up on his feet in the midst of a tirade, pacing and raging around the bench area. In these moments, he'd also been known to sit atop the desktop of his bench to add emphasis to his long, angry tirades. The harshest of Brown's tirades had generally been delivered to men whose behavior he regarded as particularly irresponsible or egregious. In these moments, Brown flung out his personal values and guidance at men, such as: "Grow up and be a man", "You don't know nothing about manhood", "Quit acting like you haven't got any home training", "Be a civilized human being and stop trying to be cool", "Quit acting like a thug", "Take responsibility", and "Have a sense of class and decency." Brown had been criticized for these behaviors for "lacking self-control."

Brown tended to allow "victimized" or "wronged" litigants ample opportunity to also berate "guilty" litigants, often delighting in this and listening in amusement; moreover, he allowed audience applause and laughter at the guilty litigant's expense so that the whole courtroom was against the guilty party. With brasher litigants than other courtroom programs, however, perhaps due to the nature of the cases or at least Brown's approach, guilty litigants on Judge Joe Brown had been known to act out. On past episodes, many litigants who were perceived as guilty by Brown and treated accordingly had not hesitated to chuck items around the courtroom (such as water), disrespect the judge, or threaten the other party or spectators. In fact, in February 2010, Brown himself was sued by one of his former television show litigants for alleged slander and fraud, but won the case because of the waivers the court show had its litigants sign prior to the televised proceedings. On the series, Brown had typically responded to most of the aforementioned behaviors by telling the litigants they'd be receiving a ticket or demanding that the litigant be arrested and thrown in jail for violating a statute that requires proper behavior and decorum in arbitration.

== Recurring roles ==
The program also featured a news reporter and bailiff. Holly Evans was the bailiff from 1998 to 2006. Sonia Montejano replaced her for the rest of the run in 2006. Jacque Kessler was the show's news reporter from 1998 to 2010. Former Fox Sports and current MLB Network freelance reporter Jeanne Zelasko succeeded Kessler as the reporter in 2010. Ben Patrick Johnson was the show's announcer from 1998 to 2005. Rolonda Watts succeeded him as announcer in 2005. Popular musicians Coolio, Ike Turner, and Rick James have all been litigants on the show. After the show's cancellation, Sonia Montejano served as the bailiff on the panel court series Hot Bench for 11 seasons. Rolonda Watts served as announcer for Divorce Court for the 2014–2015 season and is currently the announcer for The Sherri Shepherd Show.

== Salary ==
It was reported in mid-2012 that Brown was the second highest paid daytime television personality, earning $20 million a year, only second to Judge Judy, who earns $45 million a year. In April 2013, however, following the show's cancellation, Brown disputed these reports claiming that CTD was only paying him $5 million a year.

== Resignation and issues with CBS ==
As reported on February 27, 2013, by Broadcasting & Cable, CBS had told Brown that the salary amount they were paying him–of $20 million (though Brown disputed this, claiming that CBS had never given him a salary of any more than $5 million)—would be cut in the wake of his declining ratings, license fees, and advertising revenues.

Ratings for Judge Joe Brown were declining during its last several seasons on the air. In the 2013 February sweeps, the show was down 20% to a 2.4 live plus same day rating from a 3.0 the previous year according to Nielsen Media Research. Brown refused to do the show under the new terms. Rather, he shopped his program to Byron Allen of Entertainment Studios. Station executives told Broadcasting & Cable they were less than happy to be learning about the dissension at the end of February 2013 when their options for replacing the show were limited.

On the final production tape day of March 14, 2013, Judge Joe Brown started at 11am and after taping 6 cases, producers cut him off at 3pm. The gallery audience was dismissed and crew was packing up when Judge Joe slammed his gavel and reportedly said: "Is that it? After 15 years? Well, I am not signing again with CBS and I'm forming my own production company!" The Judge was talking to the back of people's heads as they walked away.

CBS Television Distribution announced on March 26, 2013, that they would be cancelling the show and cease distributing the series after its summer 2013 reruns. Fox station owners (that had contracted to air the program) were reportedly not interested in a CBS-chosen replacement judge (which would have been Marion County, Indiana Judge Geoffrey Gaither).

Brown later called out CBS for their treatment of him, claiming they had reneged on contract agreements, cheated him out of money, failed to give him sufficient advertising in favor of concentrating their advertisements in Judge Judy, and engaged in several other unjust, underhanded and unethical business practices. Worthy to note, Sheindlin of Judge Judy would also later walk out on CBS, citing her own resentment with management moves under the distributor related to salary cuts and the handling of a court series she produces Hot Bench. After receiving $100 million from CBS for selling back her entire series catalog, Judy Sheindlin was essentially replaced in syndication by her own reruns. Sheindlin continued to executive produce with a different distributor, Amazon Studios, to do the same arbitration-based legal dispute handling on Judy Justice, which airs through streaming on Amazon Prime Video.
