= Judge Judy season 1 =

Courtroom television series

Judge Judy
- Season 1
- No. of episodes: 220

Release
- Original network: First-run syndication
- Original release: September 16, 1996 – September 5, 1997

Season chronology
- Next → Judge Judy season 2

The first season of arbitration-based reality court show Judge Judy aired from September 16, 1996, to September 5, 1997, and consisted of 220 episodes. The season is currently streamed on Paramount Global's Pluto TV courtroom station.

== Reception ==
Prior to the court show debuting, it had been promoted as "Hot Bench," then "Hot Bench with Judge Judy" before ultimately becoming Judge Judy. When the series launched in September 1996, it went on the air with little media attention and publicity. By the end of October 1996, the show was averaging only a 1.5 rating, putting it in the mid-rank of the 159 syndicated shows on the air. At that time, it was never expected that the show's ratings would ever compete with highly successful daytime TV shows of that era, such as The Oprah Winfrey Show, The Rosie O'Donnell Show and The Jerry Springer Show.

According to Biography's documentary film on Sheindlin, "Judge Judy: Sitting in Judgment" (aired February 21, 2000), producers of Judge Judy were disappointed that the show was barely making it on the radar. It did not take long, however, for the court show to pick up momentum as Judge Judy rose to a 2.1 rating by the end of this first season.

The series premiered as the 3rd arbitration-based reality style court show, preceded by The People's Court (at the time, in an extended hiatus from cancelation due to low ratings after 12 seasons) and Jones & Jury (lasting only the 1994–95 season, short-lived from low ratings).

== Celebrity guests litigants and witnesses ==
In contrast to the vast majority of the show's run which did not consist of any celebrities, occasional celebrity guest litigants and witnesses were not uncommon in the court show's very early seasons. Bea Arthur, famed actress from television series Maude and The Golden Girls, appeared in season 1, episode 30 on October 25, 1996. In her appearance, Arthur served as a witness for a defendant associated with animal-rights organization PETA.

== Unaired Hot Bench pilot before Judge Judy began ==
Not to be confused with the series premiere, the show's 1995 pilot episode used to sell the program to Big Ticket by a talent agency (later known as "Rebel Entertainment Partners") has never aired on television.

At the time of 1995 pilot before the show's official 1996 premiere, the court show's title was "Hot Bench" before later transitioning to Judge Judy. The pilot consisted of a test actor playing the role of bailiff as opposed to Petri Hawkins-Byrd, who ended up with the court show as bailiff for its entire 25 season run. This resulted from Sheindlin feeling there was a lack of chemistry between her and the pilot episode bailiff, and subsequently refusing him and other proposed actors the opportunity in favor of Byrd. Her work relationship with Byrd predates the courtroom series as he was her bailiff on a rotating basis in the Manhattan family court system from 1986 to 1989. When Byrd later sent Sheindlin a congratulatory letter in 1995, she asked if he would be her bailiff and he accepted.

On May 21, 2021, Sheindlin was asked by USA Today what she recalled of her Judge Judy pilot episode. Sheindlin responded by expressing great disfavor with the pilot, indicating that Judge Judy producers only set up fictionalized cases for that episode and steered her to dramatized reactions and behaviors. This ultimately ended up in Sheindlin's production team sending only bits and pieces of the pilot to CBS for approval of the show's broadcast. During the interview, Sheindlin recounted:

I remember that somebody then was trying to fit me into a sort of cookie cutter (mold). They had seen the 60 minutes [documentary], and they thought the approach that they saw in 60 minutes could be almost a caricature, and I'm not a caricature of that person, I am that person. So the cases that they brought to me to do the pilot were not genuine, and I couldn't react to things that weren't genuine. Because when I'm trying to figure out the truth of a case, and there really is no truth, I can't work. So they took little snippets of the pilot and created a sizzle reel, along with 60 Minutes tape and sold that."

== Episodes ==
Season	Season episode	Series episode	Title	Airdate	Ref
1	1	1	Neighbor's Noisy Radio; Dog Bites Little Boy.	September 16, 1996	
1	2	2	A dispute ends in assault.	September 17, 1996	
1	3	3	Vandals; car repossession.	September 18, 1996	
1	4	4	Neighbor wrecks wall; policeman's civil complaint against a speeder.	September 19, 1996	
1	5	5	Engagement ring; dog attack.	September 20, 1996	
1	6	6	Lovers' dispute and unpaid loan.	September 23, 1996	
1	7	7	Spinster misused, custody case.	September 24, 1996	
1	8	8	Vandalism. child molester.	September 25, 1996	
1	9	9	Sex discrimination, Former Lovers Rumble in the Park .	September 26, 1996	
1	10	10	Diamond-ring dispute; roommates.	September 27, 1996	
1	11	11	Woman Sues Boss over Massages on the Job.	September 30, 1996	
1	12	12	Deadbeat dad; unpaid loan.	October 1, 1996	
1	13	13	Difficult break-up; medical-bill suit.	October 2, 1996	
1	14	14	Free-loading guests; dog kills rabbit.	October 3, 1996	
1	15	15	Adoption Dispute; Car Loan charges owed by ex	October 4, 1996	
1	16	16	Defendant Arrested and Released.	October 7, 1996	
1	17	17	Unsettled loan agreement; daughter's tattoo	October 8, 1996	
1	18	18	Romance went Sour; A faulty toy.	October 9, 1996	
1	19	19	Disturbing the peace; dog bites boy.	October 10, 1996	
1	20	20	Guests debate the legalization of drugs.	October 11, 1996	
1	21	21	Single mother sues her lover; airplane-ticket suit.	October 14, 1996	
1	22	22	TV repairman thought he got a lemon car; teen's phone bill.	October 15, 1996	
1	23	23	Computer-dating service; married man has girlfriend buy him a car	October 16, 1996	
1	24	24	Car trade turns violent; sick dogs.	October 17, 1996	
1	25	25	Noisy granny; plumber cons woman	October 18, 1996	
1	26	26	Dog fight; roommates split.	October 21, 1996	
1	27	27	Vehicle title; restaurant sued.	October 22, 1996	
1	28	28	Unpaid loans.	October 23, 1996	
1	29	29	Estate contested; vacation expenses.	October 24, 1996	
1	30	30	Animal cruelty (ft. Bea Arthur as a witness).	October 25, 1996	
1	31	31	A damaged motorcycle; woman sues former boss.	October 28, 1996	
1	32	32	A damaged truck; filmmakers sue music producer.	October 29, 1996	
1	33	33	Business deal goes bust; racial slurs are scratched into a car.	October 30, 1996	
1	34	34	Woman sues ex-husband; ruined wedding photos.	October 31, 1996	
1	35	35	Man sues mother-in-law; an unpaid loan.	November 1, 1996	
1	36	36	Landlord's sexual harassment.	November 4, 1996	
1	37	37	Rape case.	November 5, 1996	
1	38	38	Breast implants.	November 6, 1996	
1	39	39	Fender bender; actor's compensation.	November 7, 1996	
1	40	40	Brawl injuries.	November 8, 1996	
1	41	41	Custody case.	November 11, 1996	
1	42	42	Car loan tiff; vacation photos.	November 12, 1996	
1	43	43	Harassing former boyfriend; gambling debts.	November 13, 1996	
1	44	44	Engagement-ring dispute; toeless dog.	November 14, 1996	
1	45	45	Credit-card dispute; attempted kidnapping.	November 15, 1996	
1	46	46	Jailbird sues girlfriend; woman sues estranged son-in-law.	November 18, 1996	
1	47	47	Unpaid taxes; car loan.	November 19, 1996	
1	48	48	Coat-check liability; manager sues musician.	November 20, 1996	
1	49	49	Uninsured motorist; speeding motorist.	November 21, 1996	
1	50	50	Vandalism; stolen refrigerator.	November 22, 1996	
1	51	51	Child custody; former lovers sue each other.	November 25, 1996	
1	52	52	Polygamy.	November 26, 1996	
1	53	53	Assaulted tow-truck driver; dog-custody case.	November 27, 1996	
1	54	54	Engagement ring; biting dog.	November 28, 1996	
1	55	55	Break-in; unpaid loan	November 29, 1996	
1	56	56	Baby sitter sues for back wages.	December 2, 1996	
1	57	57	Sexual harassment.	December 3, 1996	
1	58	58	Dispute over diamond; battling roommates.	December 4, 1996	
1	59	59	Damaged property; broken contract.	December 5, 1996	
1	60	60	Broken contract; Divine Brown.	December 6, 1996	
1	61	61	Damaged car; lovers' loans.	December 9, 1996	
1	62	62	Heirloom jewelry; loan suit.	December 10, 1996	
1	63	63	Woman sues father; brother sues brother.	December 11, 1996	
1	64	64	Eviction; magician sued.	December 12, 1996	
1	65	65	Woman resists arrest after accident; abandoned, wrecked car.	December 13, 1996	
1	66	66	Cosmetic samples; car quibbles.	December 16, 1996	
1	67	67	Couple seeks custody of grandchildren.	December 17, 1996	
1	68	68	Loans for wedding expenses disputed.	December 18, 1996	
1	69	69	Couples' separation financial dispute; high-interest loan between brothers.	December 19, 1996	
1	70	70	Incompatible couple; gambling losses.	December 20, 1996	
1	71	71	Wrecked motorcycle; woman sues former employer.	December 23, 1996	
1	72	72	Paternity.	December 24, 1996	
1	73	73	Spinster exploited; custody case.	December 25, 1996	
1	74	74	Defendant arrested.	December 26, 1996	
1	75	75	Vandals; repossessed car.	December 27, 1996	
1	76	76	In-laws evict woman.	December 30, 1996	
1	77	77	Custody dispute; money dispute ends friendship.	December 31, 1996	
1	78	78	Child support; teen's living expenses.	January 1, 1997	
1	79	79	Joy-riding teens.	January 2, 1997	
1	80	80	Hair salon sued; doll-maker.	January 3, 1997	
1	81	81	Money squabble conceals custody case.	January 6, 1997	
1	82	82	Baby sitters' liability.	January 7, 1997	
1	83	83	Vengeful former spouses.	January 8, 1997	
1	84	84	Woman sues her daughter; tire loan.	January 9, 1997	
1	85	85	BMW stalls; roommates.	January 10, 1997	
1	86	86	Fist fight.	January 13, 1997	
1	87	87	Shoplifter sues police captain.	January 14, 1997	
1	88	88	Bounced check.	January 15, 1997	
1	89	89	Unregistered vehicle; vandals.	January 16, 1997	
1	90	90	Courtship gifts; music promoter sued.	January 17, 1997	
1	91	91	Tenant sued; estranged couple's money.	January 20, 1997	
1	92	92	Child support; assault allegations.	January 21, 1997	
1	93	93	Unpaid legal fees; forged check.	January 22, 1997	
1	94	94	Man sues woman over gifts.	January 23, 1997	
1	95	95	Ex-husband sued; shipping service sued.	January 24, 1997	
1	96	96	Smashed vehicle.	January 27, 1997	
1	97	97	Stolen rent.	January 28, 1997	
1	98	98	Couch sold; eviction leads to theft.	January 29, 1997	
1	99	99	Roommates.	January 30, 1997	
1	100	100	Hasty departure.	January 31, 1997	
1	101	101	Woman attacked.	February 3, 1997	
1	102	102	Loan disputes.	February 4, 1997	
1	103	103	Room-rent deposit.	February 5, 1997	
1	104	104	Vandalized house.	February 6, 1997	
1	105	105	Crashed car; abusive club patron.	February 7, 1997	
1	106	106	Ring traded for car.	February 10, 1997	
1	107	107	Mother sues daughter.	February 11, 1997	
1	108	108	Domestic-partners suit.	February 12, 1997	
1	109	109	John Byner sues a theater; joint property.	February 13, 1997	
1	110	110	Dental braces.	February 14, 1997	
1	111	111	Litigious roommate; broken nose.	February 17, 1997	
1	112	112	Abandoned lizards; estate law.	February 18, 1997	
1	113	113	Friendship goes to the dogs.	February 19, 1997	
1	114	114	Damaged wedding dress; nightclub owner.	February 20, 1997	
1	115	115	Stolen money.	February 21, 1997	
1	116	116	Truck explosion; employer sued.	February 24, 1997	
1	117	117	Man vandalizes woman's car.	February 25, 1997	
1	118	118	Tools; borrowed watch.	February 26, 1997	
1	119	119	Noisy neighbors.	February 27, 1997	
1	120	120	Rent dispute; used car.	February 28, 1997	
1	121	121	Divorced couple's computer.	March 3, 1997	
1	122	122	Canceled wedding.	March 4, 1997	
1	123	123	Basketball fans; borrowed money.	March 5, 1997	
1	124	124	“Jenny Jones” case.	March 6, 1997	
1	125	125	Loaned money.	March 7, 1997	
1	126	126	Divorced mail-order bride.	March 10, 1997	
1	127	127	Loaned stereo; repossessed minivan.	March 11, 1997	
1	128	128	Joey Buttafuoco.	March 12, 1997	
1	129	129	Handyman.	March 13, 1997	
1	130	130	Cap sellers.	March 14, 1997	
1	131	131	Couple's credit cards; unpaid phone bills.	March 18, 1997	
1	132	132	Bicycle accident.	March 19, 1997	
1	133	133	Couple splits up; unpaid rent.	March 20, 1997	
1	134	134	Deadly car wreck; fired employee.	March 21, 1997	
1	135	135	Intrusive landlord; dating service.	March 25, 1997	
1	136	136	Cactus custody; separated pair.	March 26, 1997	
1	137	137	Giver/taker; heirloom silver.	March 27, 1997	
1	138	138	Freeloader son; mother's grief.	March 28, 1997	
1	139	139	Birthday car.	March 31, 1997	
1	140	140	Return of tools; money dispute.	April 1, 1997	
1	141	141	Dancing horse business.	April 2, 1997	
1	142	142	Restaurant patron; band's debts.	April 3, 1997	
1	143	143	Character in question; bus business.	April 4, 1997	
1	144	144	Dog prints; con-man lover.	April 7, 1997	
1	145	145	Pilfering lover.	April 22, 1997	
1	146	146	Discrimination; litigious lovers.	April 24, 1997	
1	147	147	Memorabilia; unpaid loan.	April 28, 1997	
1	148	148	Philanderer sued.	April 29, 1997	
1	149	149	Chaperon's expenses; jet-ski loan.	April 30, 1997	
1	150	150	Roommates' dispute; babysitter.	May 2, 1997	
1	151	151	Failed romance ends apartment-sharing.	May 5, 1997	
1	152	152	Teen altercation.	May 6, 1997	
1	153	153	Bad relationship; dead ostrich.	May 8, 1997	
1	154	154	Falsely accused; drunken-driving arrest.	May 9, 1997	
1	155	155	Hotel bill; mother sues child.	May 12, 1997	
1	156	156	Limousine no-show.	May 14, 1997	
1	157	157	Damaged car; attacking pets.	May 15, 1997	
1	158	158	Squabble; bad dye job.	May 16, 1997	
1	159	159	Women fight over a man.	May 19, 1997	
1	160	160	Ex-lover sued; football injury.	May 21, 1997	
1	161	161	Loaned car; bail retribution.	May 22, 1997	
1	162	162	Altercation; blackjack brawl.	May 23, 1997	
1	163	163	Father sues son; divorced couple's debt.	May 26, 1997	
1	164	164	Neutered dog; custody case.	May 27, 1997	
1	165	165	Polygamy debate.	May 28, 1997	
1	166	166	Dented car hood; wigmaker.	May 29, 1997	
1	167	167	Invasion of privacy.	May 30, 1997	
1	168	168	Root canal; wedding dress.	June 2, 1997	
1	169	169	Engagement ring.	June 3, 1997	
1	170	170	Computer sale.	June 4, 1997	
1	171	171	Unpaid loans; dog prints in concrete.	June 5, 1997	
1	172	172	Unpaid rent; account withdrawal.	June 6, 1997	
1	173	173	Restaurant patron bounced; a band's debts.	June 9, 1997	
1	174	174	Drunken brawl.	June 10, 1997	
1	175	175	Divorce.	June 11, 1997	
1	176	176	Chaperon's expenses; jet skis.	June 12, 1997	
1	177	177	Cosmetic samples; car dispute.	June 13, 1997	
1	178	178	Same-sex domestic partners.	June 16, 1997	
1	179	179	Unpaid loans.	June 17, 1997	
1	180	180	Unruly teens.	June 18, 1997	
1	181	181	Traffic tickets; broken guitars.	June 19, 1997	
1	182	182	Child support.	June 20, 1997	
1	183	183	Unpaid loan.	June 23, 1997	
1	184	184	Missing memorabilia; unpaid loan.	June 24, 1997	
1	185	185	Divorce settlement.	June 25, 1997	
1	186	186	Lizard sale; diamond ring.	June 26, 1997	
1	187	187	Unpaid debts.	June 27, 1997	
1	188	188	Wedding coordinator.	June 30, 1997	
1	189	189	Car-ownership case.	July 10, 1997	
1	190	190	Contested bills.	July 11, 1997	
1	191	191	Lovers' suit.	July 14, 1997	
1	192	192	Limo company sued.	July 15, 1997	
1	193	193	Friendships end in litigation.	July 16, 1997	
1	194	194	Job-injury suit; car sale.	July 17, 1997	
1	195	195	Lesbian breakup.	July 18, 1997	
1	196	196	Abusive boyfriend.	July 28, 1997	
1	197	197	Mother-in-law sued for harassment; sailors and money.	July 29, 1997	
1	198	198	Broken engagement.	July 30, 1997	
1	199	199	Ex-roommate sued.	July 31, 1997	
1	200	200	Drunken carousing; wigmaker.	August 1, 1997	
1	201	201	Spayed Labrador; unpaid bills.	August 4, 1997	
1	202	202	Storage; porno-film producer.	August 5, 1997	
1	203	203	Vehicle repossession; stamp collection thrown away.	August 6, 1997	
1	204	204	Cameraman hit by car.	August 7, 1997	
1	205	205	Unpaid babysitter; incompatible roommates.	August 8, 1997	
1	206	206	Child custody.	August 11, 1997	
1	207	207	Rent dispute.	August 14, 1997	
1	208	208	Old, unpaid loan; damaged car.	August 18, 1997	
1	209	209	Man sues mail-order bride.	August 19, 1997	
1	210	210	Shoplifting accusations; sour wine tasting.	August 20, 1997	
1	211	211	Loaned-car tragedy; telemarketer.	August 21, 1997	
1	212	212	Bar-room brawl.	August 22, 1997	
1	213	213	Unpaid tattoo artist; unpaid saleswoman.	August 26, 1997	
1	214	214	Miscarriage; ex-lovers.	August 27, 1997	
1	215	215	Gunfight.	August 29, 1997	
1	216	216	Sexual-harassment suit.	September 1, 1997	
1	217	217	Truck mishap; employer sued.	September 2, 1997	
1	218	218	Yoga teacher.	September 3, 1997	
1	219	219	Parents sue daughter.	September 4, 1997	
1	220	220	BMW dispute; former lovers and money.	September 5, 1997	
