= Worldvision =

Worldvision may refer to:

- World Vision, an international Christian relief and development organization
- Worldvision Enterprises, a television program and home video distributor
