= Judge Judy =

American reality court show (1996–2021)

- Genre: Arbitration-based reality court show
- Created by: Kaye Switzer; Sandi Spreckman
- Directed by: Randy Douthit
- Presented by: Judge Judy Sheindlin; Bailiff Petri Hawkins-Byrd
- Narrated by: Michael J. Stull; Jerry Bishop; Steve Kamer
- Theme music composer: Fred Lapides; Bill Bodine; Non-Stop Music Productions
- Opening theme: Symphony No. 5, First movement by Ludwig van Beethoven (seasons 9–25)
- Country of origin: United States
- Original language: English
- No. of seasons: 25
- No. of episodes: 6,280

Production
- Executive producer: Randy Douthit
- Camera setup: Multi-camera
- Running time: 22 minutes
- Production companies: Big Ticket Television; Queen Bee Productions (CBS Primetime Special)

Original release
- Network: Syndication
- Release: September 16, 1996 – July 23, 2021

Related
- Judy Justice (Sheindlin as judge); Tribunal Justice (Byrd as bailiff, produced by Sheindlin)

Judge Judy is an American arbitration-based reality court show presided over by former Manhattan Family Court judge Judith Sheindlin. The show featured Sheindlin as she adjudicated real-life small-claims disputes within a simulated courtroom set. Prior to the proceedings, all involved parties signed arbitration contracts agreeing to Sheindlin's ruling. The show aired in first-run syndication. As it was during its active years in production, it continues to be distributed by CBS Media Ventures in syndication, now in reruns that still draw notably high ratings.

The series premiered on September 16, 1996, and concluded on July 23, 2021. The court show ended with its 25th season after Sheindlin and CBS renewed their contract for the final time in 2017. During its run in new episodes, the show did not release airings in the order they were taped. Thus the final filmed case of the series aired on June 8, 2021. While later seasons of the show are currently airing in syndication, the first three seasons are on Pluto TV's Judge Judy channel. Since 2021, the show has also had its own active YouTube channel as well along with its sister show Hot Bench.

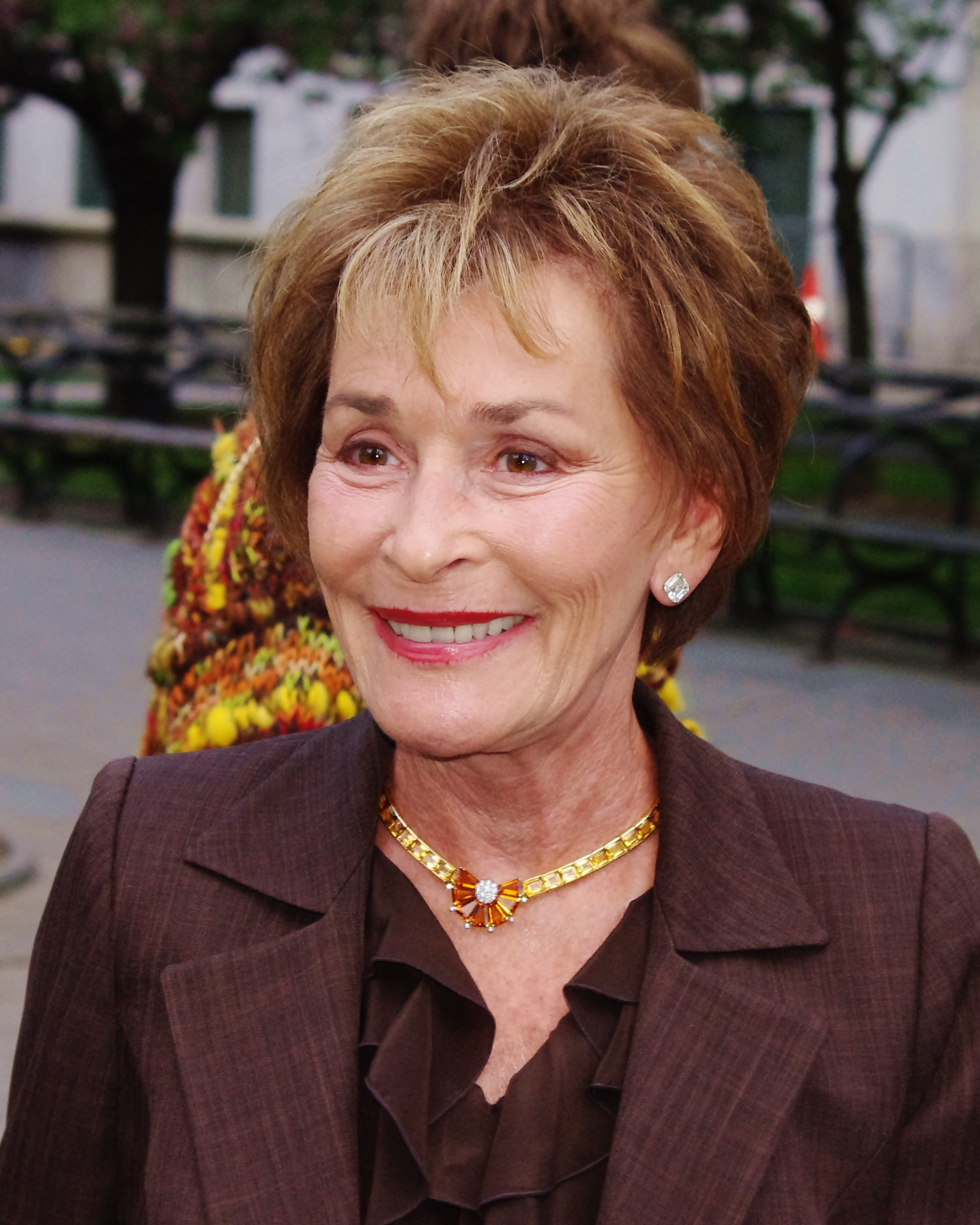
Judge Judy Sheindlin in 2012

Judge Judy had an impact on courtroom programming, reviving the genre as a whole. It was the highest Nielsen-rated court show for the entirety of its 25-year run in original episodes, also frequently ranking as highest-rated television broadcast in daytime television and syndication. Of the court shows with a single series run (without on-and-off production from cancellation turned series revivals/recasting), Judge Judy had the most seasons. The series also won three Emmy Awards; earned Sheindlin a Guinness World Records recognition for longest serving television arbitrator; and originated many courtroom programming trends, from use of eponymous show titles to cold open trailers.

Two court spin-offs have generated from Judge Judy: Judy Justice (2021–2026), starring Sheindlin as judge; and Tribunal Justice (2023–present), featuring Byrd as bailiff. Like Judy Justice, Tribunal Justice is created by Sheindlin and streamed on Amazon Freevee.

== Background ==
=== Origins and development ===
After Joseph Wapner was released from The People's Court on May 21, 1993, Sheindlin called up the program's producers, Ralph Edwards-Stu Billett Productions and Warner Bros. Television, and offered to do the show in his place. The receptionist who answered the phone responded "Are you crazy, lady?" before hanging up on Sheindlin. Earlier that same year in February 1993, a Los Angeles Times article on Sheindlin's reputation as one of the toughest family court judges in the country, written by Josh Getlin (inspired by his wife, Heidi, both of whom Sheindlin credits with her stardom) caught the attention of 60 Minutes, which aired a segment on her on October 24, 1993. The segment brought her national recognition, and days later from its airing, led to Sheindlin receiving an offer from a literary agent to write her first book. Sheindlin accepted the offer, writing Don't Pee on My Leg and Tell Me It's Raining, published on February 7, 1996. Its publisher, HarperCollins, expressed disapproval of her book title, claiming no one would promote it under that kind of name. Sheindlin stood her ground on the use of the title and ended up selling 216,709 copies.

In March 1995, two talent scouts (before that, former People's Court producers) from a talent agency that was later called "Rebel Entertainment", Kaye Switzer and Sandi Spreckman, asked Sheindlin if she would like to preside over her own courtroom series. Sheindlin eventually accepted, and the "Rebel" talent agency used a pilot episode to pitch to then-Big Ticket Television president Larry Lyttle in 1995. Switzer, Spreckman, along with Rebel Entertainment Owner Richard Lawrence later sued CBS and Sheindlin numerous times over allegedly owed profit shares for their part in commencing the program and introducing the two parties.

Sheindlin originally wanted the show title to be "Hot Bench", and the network and various news publications even promoted it as Hot Bench for some time prior to débuting, but Big Ticket Television ultimately decided on "Judge Judy". The Hot Bench title was eventually used by Sheindlin, however, for a different court show she later created (2014–present), which does not feature Sheindlin herself, but rather a panel of judges she cast for the series.

Petri Hawkins-Byrd, referred to on the program simply as Byrd or Officer Byrd, was the bailiff on Judge Judy for the show's entire 25-season run, making him the longest-serving bailiff in court television history. Byrd's professional relationship with Sheindlin predates Judge Judy as he was her bailiff throughout her career in the Manhattan family court system. When Byrd found out about Sheindlin's show, he sent her a congratulatory letter, stating, "If you ever need a bailiff, I still look good in uniform." She phoned Byrd at his home in California to accept his offer, and he ended up replacing the unaired pilot episode bailiff. Sheindlin has stated that the show's producers wanted various individuals for the role of bailiff, but she refused.

Sheindlin has revealed that from the start, she envisioned her courtroom program lasting only 2 to 3 seasons, acknowledging that most TV ventures fail. Sheindlin appeared again on 60 Minutes on April 30, 2003. During the interview, Sheindlin stated:

I have a contract with the company to do the program through the 2006 season. At that point, we will have produced this program for 10 years. Right now, I would be satisfied with a good 10-year run. I think that would really be phenomenal. It would be lovely if we could end on a high note and for me to say "10 years and I still had people watching and I had a second career that was a blast."

On September 14, 2015, Sheindlin began celebrating her 20th season anniversary presiding on Judge Judy. The program is the first in the court show genre to make it to 20 seasons without cancellation, as well as the first to make it to this extent under one arbitrator. Three years later by September 2018, the Judge Mathis court show entered its 20th season and became the second and only other court show to accomplish this feat. Sheindlin's distinction as television's longest-serving judge or arbitrator won her a place in the Guinness World Records on September 14, 2015. Judge Judy completed its series run at 25 seasons. In honor of the 25th and final season of the program, Josh Getlin published another article on Sheindlin. The Los Angeles Times article, published on June 8, 2021 (the same day as the airing of the final filmed case), shared background details about the 1993 article that catapulted Sheindlin's television career and his relationship with Sheindlin.

=== On-air format ===
Each episode of Judge Judy begins with a cold open trailer of the main case, sensationalizing various moments of the case with brief soundbites accompanied with dramatic music, voice-over commentary, graphics, etc. This is followed by the show's title sequence music video. At the beginning of each court proceeding, information regarding who is suing whom and what for is provided by voice-over commentary. When Sheindlin made her entrance, the courtroom audience was brought to order and instructed to rise by Byrd. He then informed Sheindlin of the docket number on the court calendar in the midst of providing Sheindlin a file of legal statements about the case, and directing audience members to be seated.

Sheindlin typically began each case by summarizing the disputed matters brought before her. This was followed by preliminary questioning of the parties as to dates, times, locations, and other scene-setting facts before addressing the crux of the lawsuit. Governing the discourse throughout the cases, Sheindlin typically allowed only brief portions of each of the testimonies; having read the parties' sworn statements before the taping, she was quick to reply and disallow responses that were not concise or which interrupted her. Less frequently, Sheindlin allowed one or both of the opposing litigants to recount the entirety of their testimony. During the proceedings, Sheindlin required the parties to adhere to her policies: participants were not allowed to tuck hands in pockets, drink water (unless they ask first), fold arms, chew gum, appear for court dressed revealingly or casually, speak out of turn, hesitate in answering questions, offer statements of hearsay, assert to the knowledge and thoughts of others, and had to maintain eye contact with Sheindlin while relaying testimony, among other things. If Sheindlin deemed that children were not needed to testify, she directed Byrd to escort them out of the courtroom at the outset of the proceedings. If children testified, occasionally teens as well, Sheindlin would have them sit on the witness stand next to her, which Byrd typically stood in front of. Sheindlin would also have Byrd give her important documentation related to the case such as pictures, letters, contracts, bills (medical bills, auto repair bills, etc), and later, text messages. Byrd would also play videos and give Sheindlin Kelly Blue Book car values (such as on a Dodge Dakota). Judy also made phone calls from her office if she deemed it necessary.

Like most modern court shows, cases on Judge Judy imitated small claims court cases in which civil trials (non-criminal cases) were heard and ruled on. Typically Sheindlin handled cases among former lovers, disputing neighbors, couples, or family and friend relations. Disputes generally revolved around issues such as broken engagements, unpaid personal loans, contract breaches, personal injuries from other litigants or their pets, minor property damages (e.g., fender benders, carpet stains, etc.), jointly purchased household appliances, landlord disputes, and rightful ownership of property. As is standard practice in small claims court and most reality court shows alike, Judge Judy proceedings operated in the form of a bench trial (as opposed to its more common counterpart, the jury trial). Lawyers were not present, and litigants had to represent themselves. Generally each show presented two cases, but infrequently, an episode would present a single long case, three shorter ones, or four shorter ones. Some cases took two episodes or more to resolve, and some involved the plaintiff and defendant switching sides halfway through.

After expressing her views of the circumstances and behaviors of the litigants with regards to their testimonies, Sheindlin rendered the judgment either by finding for the plaintiff (typically by stating, "Judgement for the plaintiff in the amount of x dollars,") and a closing exclamation, (such as "That's all," "We're done," or "Goodbye!"), or by dismissing the case specifically with or without prejudice. After she ruled and exited the courtroom, Byrd stated: "Parties are excused. You may step out," after which he escorted the litigants out of the courtroom. Any counterclaims filed were handled similarly. If Judy recalled a case, Byrd would state: "Parties are excused. This case will be recalled," and once the case continued, Byrd would say "Parties are reminded you're still under oath."

At the end of each case, there was typically a fourth-wall–breaking segment during which litigants, and sometimes their witnesses, expressed their feelings regarding the case directly to broadcast viewers. Sometimes, however, these segments were omitted, especially after cases involving resentful litigants, too upset over the circumstances to remain in the studio and provide comments.

=== Production ===
The producers of Judge Judy hired extras from an audience service who composed the entire studio. Paid audience members were easier to manage due to contracts and employment. Producers also looked for a certain demographic of individuals and sat them strategically throughout their audience. Most of these paid extras were aspiring actors. Though tickets were not offered for the show, arrangements could sometimes be made with Sheindlin's production staff to allow fans of the show into the audience. The extras could not dress casually, and no logos or brand names could be visible on their clothing. Extras were also instructed to appear as if they were having discussions with each other before and after each case, so Byrd made such announcements as "Order! All rise."

To acquire cases, the show generally used one of the following three options:

- Its 60 to 65 researchers, spread out across the country, entered small claims courts and photocopied numerous cases. These photocopied cases were then sent to Judge Judy producers, who reviewed them all in search of lawsuits they believed made for good television. According to the show's producers, only 3% of the photocopied cases were worthy enough for television.
- Its telephone number posting/announcement presented on each episode where interested individuals could call in with lawsuits.
- Its website whereby lawsuits could be written out and submitted to the show.

After one of these three processes, if the producers were interested, their employees would then call both parties and ask them questions relating to their lawsuit, making sure they were suitable for Judge Judy. If the parties agreed to be on the show and signed an arbitration contract, agreeing that arbitration in Sheindlin's court was final and couldn't be pursued elsewhere (unless Sheindlin dismissed the lawsuit without prejudice), their case would air on Judge Judy.

The award limit on Judge Judy, as on most "syndi-court" shows (and most small claims courts in the U.S.), was $5,000. The award for each judgment was paid by the producers of the show from a fund reserved for the purpose. Sheindlin ruled by either A.) issuing a verdict of a specific dollar amount (not always in the full amount of what is requested and rarely more than what was requested even if she believed complainants were deserving of more) or B.) by dismissing the lawsuit altogether. When ruled on in these manners, cases couldn't be refiled or retried elsewhere. However, if Sheindlin dismissed the lawsuit "without prejudice", that lawsuit could be refiled and retried in another forum. In some instances, Sheindlin dismissed cases without prejudice to allow complainants to bring their case in an actual court of law, rendering the defendants financially accountable as opposed to the show. In such cases, Sheindlin expressed particular aversion to the defendants in question. Further, Sheindlin dismissed cases without prejudice when she suspected both the plaintiff(s) and defendant(s) of conspiring together to gain monetary rewards from the program.

Both the plaintiff(s) and the defendant(s) also received an appearance fee. The appearance fee amount varied between different litigants of the show: certain litigants reported receiving a $500 appearance fee while others reported receiving $100, and others $250. In addition to the appearance fee amount, reportedly (at least some) litigants were paid $35 a day by the show. The litigants' stay lasted for the number of days that the show did taping for that week, which was two or three days. In addition, the airfare (or other means of travel) and hotel expenses of the litigants and their witnesses were covered by the show, and the experience was generally treated as an all-expense-paid vacation outside of the actual court case. If there was an exchange of property, Sheindlin signed an order, and a sheriff or marshal oversaw the exchange. Sheindlin saw only a half-page complaint and a defense response before the taping of the cases, sometimes only moments before. Most of the cases, not including any footage deleted to meet the time constraints of the show, usually lasted anywhere from twelve to forty-five minutes.

Judge Judy, like most court programs, was inexpensive to produce and thus created considerable income. A budget for a week's worth of Judge Judy episodes was half the cost of a single network sitcom episode.

=== Recordings and airings ===
Three days every other week (two weeks a month), Sheindlin and her producers taped the court show. They usually produced ten to twelve cases for each day they taped the show. This made for about a week's worth of episodes, all done within one day. Anywhere from thirty to thirty-six cases were taped over three days during the week. Sheindlin appeared as a guest on Jimmy Kimmel Live! on September 13, 2011. When asked by Kimmel how many days a month she works, Sheindlin replied, "Five days." Sheindlin and her producers sometimes taped only five cases per day and two days per week. The show had fifty-two taping days a year. For each season, some 650 claims were brought to the set to be "presided" over by Judge Judy. This means approximately 16,250 claims had been brought to Judy Sheindlin's Hollywood set by the show's completion.

For the most part, cases were taped throughout the year except for two breaks Sheindlin and all of the staff members of her show had for the year. One of the two breaks included an extra week off in December, as the show was only taped one week out of that month because of the holidays. The other break was from mid-July (only taping one week in July) and all through August. According to members of the show, the reason for this break was that people were more interested in taking vacations than in filing lawsuits around that time. When the seasons premiered in September, only episodes perceived as the best by program staff of the ones taped before Sheindlin's break were selected to start the season. Thus, the first few weeks (the first week in particular) would consist of what the show felt to be its best episodes. In Sheindlin's words, "It's like drinking wine. You don't serve the really good bottle of wine third."

Altogether, there were 260 new episodes each season. There was at least one new episode for every weekday, except a few hiatuses during most of the summer, a couple of holidays, early spring (much of March and April), and in the latter seasons of the show. The cases were all pre-recorded for editing purposes and would usually air one to three months after being taped. The cases were mixed up and not shown in order of when they were recorded. While the cases taped in March (sometimes April) ended the seasons, the cases taped throughout April, May, June, and July started each season in September and lasted through October. Throughout the very beginning of each season, two new Judge Judy episodes aired per day. After two weeks, this was reduced to one new airing a day, followed by a repeat. There were also various other moments throughout the year where two new episodes were shown for a few weeks. This had sometimes included January when the show returned from its winter hiatus. Two new episodes were also shown daily during the "sweeps" months of November, February, and May. Unlike other television programs, the Judge Judy season finale did not air in April or May; rather, it aired in June, July, August, or sometimes even very early September the week directly preceding the start of following season. When the season finale was extended to July, August, or September, most of the summer episodes preceding it were repeats with new episodes that were few and far in between.

Two DVDs, featuring "memorable cases", were released by the show: the first in 2007, Judge Judy: Justice Served, and the second in 2008, Judge Judy: Second to None.

=== Location ===
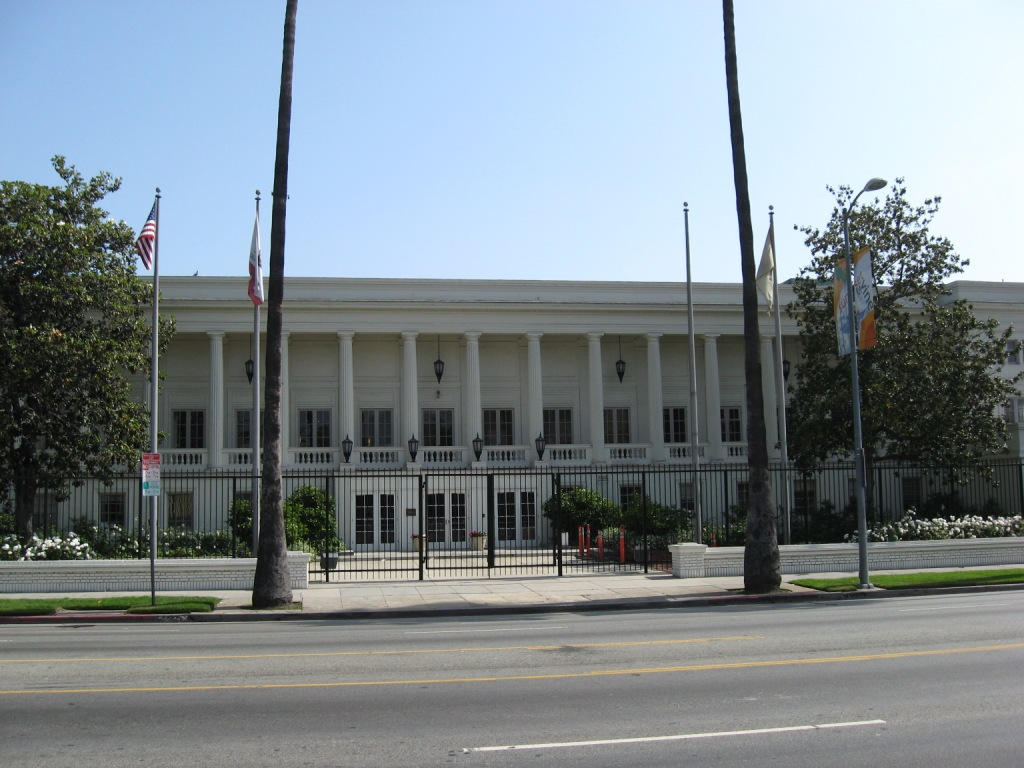
Sunset Bronson Studios is where "Judge Judy" was taped for its entire series run (though only partially during COVID-19 season 25)

For its entire 25-season run, Judge Judy taped at the Sunset Bronson Studios on Sunset Boulevard in Los Angeles, California. In alternating weeks, Sheindlin, who owns a home in New York among other cities/states, flew out on her private jet to tape her show, typically Tuesday, Wednesday, and Thursday.

From 2014 through the conclusion of Judge Judy in 2021, the show's courtroom set was located directly beside the set of the courtroom series Sheindlin created and produces, Hot Bench. Hot Bench remains in production at the Sunset Bronson Studios. Previous to that, the space directly beside Sheindlin's set was used for the courtroom series Paternity Court, only for the 2013–14 television season (that court show's 1st season). Prior to that, the space was used for Judge Judy's sister show Judge Joe Brown until Judge Joe Brown's 2013 cancellation. Like Judge Judy, Judge Joe Brown was also produced by Big Ticket Entertainment. The two shows alternated taping weeks.

Despite the show being taped primarily in California, it displayed various images of New York City during the incoming commercial bumpers (audio and visuals shown returning from commercial breaks), including New York subways, parks, monuments, etc. In addition, the words "State of New York" and "Family Court" (Sheindlin was previously a New York family court judge in addition to being a native of New York) scrolled back and forth within the letterbox-like graphics that appeared during the show's outgoing and incoming commercial bumpers, lasting from season 9 through 25. The set also featured a New York state flag (positioned across from an American flag) situated behind Judge Judy Sheindlin's chair.

== Program remodeling and restyling updates ==
Over the show's 25-year existence, it saw very few restyling updates from season to season, that is, outside of seasons 1, 2, 9, and 25 (season 25 due to COVID-19). Outside of initial seasons and the final season, most modifications to the program had been done in minute detail, such as to the show's bookshelf display seen near the courtroom entrance. Aesthetically, the show's theme song, graphics, and color scheme were the only aspects that had changed repeatedly throughout its lifespan.

=== Original format, seasons 1 through 8 (1996–2004) ===
The initial episodes of Season 1 had a different courtroom set design from later episodes and seasons. The first episodes of season 1 also used music composed by Fred Lapides: a piano-based melody for the title sequence and closing credits. This theme music was not used again outside of the early stages of season 1 in 1996. The show's season 1 voice-over artist Michael Stull narrated this intro theme, stating: "This is Judge Judy. Real people—in real cases—in real conflict. She was a real judge with over 15 years of courtroom experience."

After several episodes towards the beginning of season one, the show's theme music was revamped to a percussive drum-like, ascending melody composed by Bill Bodine. Integrated into the modified theme music, the narration during the title sequence was also updated with Michael Stull announcing, "You are about to enter the courtroom of Judge Judith Sheindlin. The people are real. The cases are real. The rulings are final. This is her courtroom. This is Judge Judy." This narration lasted through season 8 of the program, though Jerry Bishop took over the narration by season 2.

When the show switched to the melody composed by Bill Bodine in season 1, the opening music video was updated to motioning scenes of Sheindlin from the bench, gesticulating as though presiding over cases. These motioning images moved until colliding with an image of the Judge Judy courthouse logo, emphasized by a striking cymbal-like sound effect. The background scene for this title sequence music video was originally depicted in navy blue for a short portion of season 1 before switching to a sea green that same season through the 4th season.

In season 4, the entire courtroom set was redesigned while retaining the sea green and saffron graphics and intro.

By seasons 5 through 8, the title sequence started with an approaching scene towards a computer animated courthouse display up until that scene entered the courthouse. From there, several shots of Sheindlin gesticulating from her bench—as though presiding over various cases—were displayed in motion. These motioning images eventually developed into the courthouse logo that represents the program (the logo is always displayed within the letter "D" in "Judy") by the end of this opening music video. The graphics were also changed to blue and saffron along with this change.

In the seventh season, while the theme song remained, the instrumentals were updated. In addition, the font for the short closing credits and litigants font was updated but the long closing credits retained the original font. By the eighth season, the font was completely changed and the returning from commercial break scenes were replaced with New York City scenes.

=== Season 9 (2004–2005) ===
The ninth season (2004–05) was one of the few seasons in which the show underwent major remodeling when music for the show's opening, closing, and to/from commercial portions were modified. A remixed version of a melody from Beethoven's 5th Symphony was then adopted as the show's title sequence and closing music. This arrangement was composed by Non-Stop Music Productions. During the program's outgoing commercial bumpers (short portions of the program that took each episode to a commercial break, in the case of this program, adding previews of the remainder of the case or cases to be featured in the episode) a dramatic violin-like melody sounded in contrast to the Beethoven remix. When the program resumed with its incoming commercial bumper, the Beethoven remix once again played. Additionally, solemn violin-like striking tones sounded directly following Sheindlin's final verdict of each episode, lasting from season 9 through the remainder of the show's run. The graphics also began showing up in falu red.

The intro was also changed for the ninth season as well. For its scenes, the Lady Justice statue is shown followed by a split screen of Sheindlin and the Statue of Liberty (over a blue background) followed by Sheindlin approaching the camera folding her arms and smiling. This is followed by shots of her presiding over different cases (which are shown in the scales of the Lady Justice statue in cubes).

For much of the series outside of the initial episodes, the opening music video consisted of voice-over artist Jerry Bishop stating: "You are about to enter the courtroom of Judge Judith Sheindlin. The people are real. The cases are real. The rulings are final. This is Judge Judy." Originally between the statements "The rulings are final" and "This is Judge Judy" was the statement, "This is her courtroom." This line was dropped in 2004 when season 9 began.

=== Seasons 10 through 23 (2005–2019) ===
Beginning in September 2012, the show made a switch to high definition with its 17th season. The bumpers between commercials are also in HD, although most on-screen graphics such as plaintiff and defendant descriptions are framed to fit a 4:3 aspect ratio.

The 2nd episode of the 23rd season featured at-large serial rapist Negasi Zuberi (under the alias Justin Hyche) and the mother of their two children. Active since 2016, Zuberi was arrested in 2023 following the abduction and imprisonment of a woman, and sentenced to life in prison in 2025.

Late into the show's 23rd season, Sheindlin drastically altered her hairstyle by abandoning the bouffant hairdo that she had sported since the show's beginnings; she replaced that with a new style created from her hair pulled back and bounded by a clip-on hair bun at the back of her head. Her new hairstyle sparked widespread attention, and considerable negative reviews from viewers (media spectators alike) to the point that the show's Facebook moderator admonished posters that negative commentary about the clip-on bun would be deleted.

Her bailiff, Petri Hawkins-Byrd, admitted to a preference for the original hairdo. Asked about the change in hairstyle, Sheindlin described the former as "a lot of goop and teasing and product and fussing around by somebody else. This is so much easier. And as each hour in every day we have becomes more precious, the less you want to spend time patshkeing over the way you look."

=== COVID-19, seasons 24 and 25 (2019–2021) ===
In March 2020, the COVID-19 pandemic caused the 24th season production of Judge Judy to end prematurely at only 199 episodes, 61 episodes fewer than the show's typical season number of 260.

When Judge Judy returned for season 25, its final season, a multitude of COVID-19 precautionary measures were in place, vastly distinguishing this season of the show from previous seasons. Sheindlin presided remotely from New York; producers built a partial makeshift set there for her, with a different set design behind her and a larger, darker executive chair. Byrd and the litigants (and witnesses, if any) participated from the Los Angeles studio, now devoid of audience members. Sheindlin interacted with the litigants through a live Internet link. Because Byrd could not physically convey evidence between her and the litigants, evidence was scanned with a document camera at the litigant lecterns, allowing Sheindlin to view it remotely. In addition, litigant afterthoughts following the case were shared at the podiums, instead of in the hallway set used pre-COVID.

Steve Kamer took over as voice-over announcer for the 25th season after Jerry Bishop's death on April 21, 2020.

== Episodes ==
Season	Episodes	Originally aired	
Season	Episodes	First aired	Last aired
1	220	September 16, 1996	September 5, 1997
2	205	September 8, 1997	July 6, 1998
3	260	September 14, 1998	September 10, 1999
4	233	September 13, 1999	August 25, 2000
5	261	September 11, 2000	August 17, 2001
6	260	September 10, 2001	August 23, 2002
7	260	September 9, 2002	August 21, 2003
8	261	September 8, 2003	August 19, 2004
9	260	September 13, 2004	August 18, 2005
10	260	September 12, 2005	August 24, 2006
11	261	September 11, 2006	July 13, 2007
12	260	September 10, 2007	July 4, 2008
13	260	September 8, 2008	July 10, 2009
14	260	September 14, 2009	June 17, 2010
15	260	September 13, 2010	June 17, 2011
16	260	September 12, 2011	June 15, 2012
17	260	September 10, 2012	June 28, 2013
18	260	September 9, 2013	July 4, 2014
19	260	September 8, 2014	September 11, 2015
20	260	September 14, 2015	September 9, 2016
21	260	September 12, 2016	September 8, 2017
22	260	September 11, 2017	September 7, 2018
23	260	September 10, 2018	September 6, 2019
24	199	September 9, 2019	June 9, 2020
25	200	September 14, 2020	July 23, 2021

=== Series pilot and finale, final taped case ===
On May 21, 2021, Sheindlin was asked by USA Today what she recalled of her unaired Judge Judy pilot episode, used to sell the series to Big Ticket Television. Sheindlin responded by expressing great disfavor of the pilot episode, indicating that Judge Judy producers only set up fictionalized cases and steered her to dramatized reactions and behaviors. This ultimately ended up in Sheindlin's production team sending only bits and pieces of the pilot to CBS for approval of the show's broadcast. During the interview, Sheindlin recounted:

I remember that somebody then was trying to fit me into a sort of cookie cutter (mold). They had seen the 60 Minutes [documentary], and they thought the approach that they saw in 60 Minutes could be almost a caricature, and I'm not a caricature of that person, I am that person. So the cases that they brought to me to do the pilot were not genuine, and I couldn't react to things that weren't genuine. Because when I'm trying to figure out the truth of a case, and there really is no truth, I can't work. So they took little snippets of the pilot and created a sizzle reel, along with [the] 60 Minutes tape and sold that.

Sheindlin taped the final case of the series on April 15, 2021. The case, described by media spectators as mundane, saw a general contractor suing his customer over unpaid work. In this final taped case of the series, Sheindlin also made no farewell remarks nor gave any attention to it being the series' close. While this final filmed case (episode 179 of season 25, "Judge Judy Makes a Call!/Mother vs. Son") aired on June 8, 2021, cases taped before that point continued to air for the first time through the series finale episode, which aired on July 23, 2021 (episode 200 of season 25, "Architecture Barter Gone Bad"). Worthy to note, only one detail made Sheindlin's final filmed case of the series on June 8 stand out among other episodes since it was not featured in the series finale episode: that is a glittery, bee-shaped clip that Sheindlin wore in her hair. Sheindlin explained that this was a wink to her Judge Judy fans and a nod to her Queen Bee production company at the end of a 25-year reign over daytime television.

Sheindlin said, "I was as enthusiastic and rigorous in the last case that I taped as I was at the beginning." On her final day of taping, Sheindlin was reflective on her tenure on the show as "a job well done", with excitement about her new spin-off series, Judy Justice. Of her thoughts on ending the program, Sheindlin added: "I think that one of the reasons why I wasn't teary is because I wasn't going into a vast unknown. I wasn't going to do a cooking show. I was gonna be doing exactly what I was doing, exactly what I do, but in a different format."

=== Judge Judy Primetime ===
On May 20, 2014, CBS aired a one-hour special called Judge Judy Primetime which aired at 8 p.m. ET/PT. The special was a combination of reshown clips from the 1993 60 Minutes Special on Sheindlin, as well as a few never-before-seen cases. The special marked Judge Judy's first airing in primetime, a landmark for court shows which are typically limited to daytime or late night hours. It brought in 5.66 million viewers, enough to make it the night's top-rated show on CBS. In addition, the special came in just behind American Idol, which brought in 6.61 million viewers.

=== Contrived case ===
At least one case in the series was allegedly contrived by the litigants just to receive monetary payment from the program. In April 2013, former litigants from a 2010 airing of the show revealed they conspired together in fabricating a lawsuit in which the logical outcome would be to grant payment to the plaintiff. The operation, devised by musicians Kate Levitt and Jonathan Coward, was successful: Sheindlin awarded the plaintiff (Levitt) $1,000. The litigants involved also walked away with an appearance fee of $250 each and an all-expense-paid vacation to Hollywood, California. In reality, all the litigants in question—plaintiffs and defendants alike—were friends who split the earnings up among each other. It was also reported that the show's producers were suspicious of the scam all along but chose to look the other way. The lawsuit was over the fictitious death of a cat as a result of a television crushing it.

== Judge Judy in external media ==
=== Curb Your Enthusiasm ===
Sheindlin and her program appeared on the November 26, 2017, broadcast of Curb Your Enthusiasm, presiding over a sketch comedy court case with Larry David as the plaintiff who unsuccessfully sued the previous owner of his house over custody of a sick ficus plant she left behind when she moved out, but later stole back. The pseudo-Judge Judy case assumed the appearance of an actual case from Sheindlin's program, taking place from the show's courtroom set with trademarked voice-over briefs, theme music, and audience response.

=== CHiPs '99 ===
Sheindlin appeared as herself, presiding judge on her Judge Judy courtroom program in the 1998 American made-for-television crime drama film, CHiPs '99. Leading up to her cameo, Officer Francis (Frank) Llewelyn Poncherello "Ponch" (played by Erik Estrada) twists the arm of Captain Jonathan Baker (played by Larry Wilcox) into appearing on her television courtroom program. Uneasy about the idea of humiliating himself on national television, Baker acquiesces and ends up suing Nyeman (played by Googy Gress). The case saw Baker accusing Nyeman of failure to practice proper dog-walking etiquette, Nyeman was accused of allowing his dog to poop on his private property resulting in financial damage.

== Judge Judy show cast ==
=== Judge Judy ===
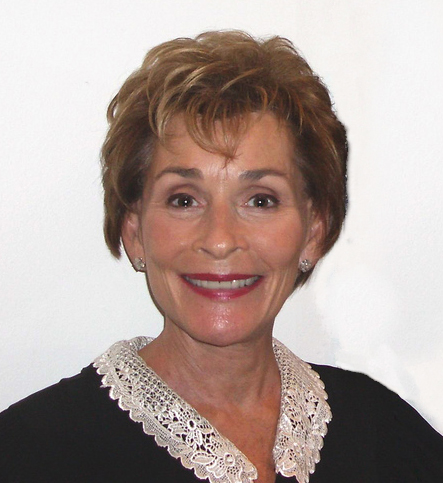
Judge Judy Sheindlin

Judge Judy Sheindlin was born on October 21, 1942, in Brooklyn, New York, to German-Jewish parents Murray and Ethel Blum.

Sheindlin had gained a reputation for although sporting a "grannyish" lace collar, having a tough judicial approach, both in the Manhattan family court and her simulated televised courtroom. Sheindlin also became known for her no-nonsense fact-finding process that limited litigants to concise and relevant statements, restiveness in getting litigants to move things along quickly, and interjections that cut through the parties' attempts at arguments and excuse-making with her.

Strict in her management of the proceedings, Sheindlin required precise compliance with her many courtroom rules and expectations. Sheindlin was sudden with scolding and punishing what she perceived as insolence, disobedience, misbehavior, or annoyance.

As a result of her crusty disposition, volatile temper, and cheeky treatment, taglines such as "Justice with an Attitude" had been used to characterize the program. Sheindlin became known for her regular catchphrases on the program, which became known as "Judyisms". Some she most commonly used are:

- "The answer is either 'yes' or 'no'".
- "'Um/Uh is not an answer," or "Uh-huh/uh-uh is not an answer," or "Yep/nope is not an answer".
- "Shoulda', woulda', coulda'".
- "I don't give a rat's what you disagree with, sir!"
- "That's baloney!"
- "Clearly, you are not wrapped too tight."
- "That's a whole lot of 'who shot John'".
- "If you tell the truth, you don't have to have a good memory."

Sheindlin used the position of television arbitrator to impart guidance, direction, and life lessons not only to her litigants but her television viewing public at large. An example of guidance often stressed by Sheindlin was to be independent through employment, especially to not live off the government where unwarranted or other people directly where oppression from or friction with the provider may eventuate. In the former, Sheindlin could often be quoted as stating, "No, you aren't supporting yourself. Byrd and I [or "We," as she pointed at herself and Byrd] are supporting you." Sheindlin said that the main message she wanted viewers to take away from her program is that people must take responsibility for their actions and do the right thing.

=== Bailiff Byrd ===
Petri Adonis Byrd was born on November 29, 1957, in the Crown Heights neighborhood of Brooklyn, New York. Byrd had his middle name legally changed to "Hawkins" when he joined the Judge Judy program as a salute to his late mother, whose maiden name was also Hawkins. In the program, Sheindlin referred to him simply as "Byrd," or less frequently "Officer Byrd."

Byrd took on the role of Sheindlin's courtroom bailiff. He introduced the cases by calling the parties forward and swearing them in, delivering evidence back and forth, and excusing the parties once the case was complete. Full of running gags, Byrd disagreed with and corrected Sheindlin in moments when she bounced questions off him for his agreement. He was also noted for his preoccupation with crosswords during the proceedings. Byrd routinely delivered evidence to Sheindlin while having his head and eye contact directed away from her. Sheindlin relied on Byrd's sophistication and academic knowledge base, with Byrd having to interject in areas to which she struggled: mathematics, new media, social media, current fads and vernacular, etc.

Sheindlin often comically incorporated Byrd amid her critiques and reprimands of litigants, such as by sharing with the parties Byrd's disapproving thoughts of them or expanding upon case details, for the benefit of Byrd's understanding, without any actual communication at all from Byrd about said litigants or details. Sheindlin has stated "We're like two old married people who have reached an accord. I can rely on [Byrd] to be my protector. We don't have to exchange words—he knows what I'm thinking. People who watch us sense we have a history, and that is very important." Byrd described Sheindlin as "Blunt, witty, and sharp as a tack." However, when asked if he'd like to appear as a litigant before her, he answered candidly (laughing), "Hell no. And I don't advise any of my friends to do so. Not if they want to maintain their love of the judicial system."

Byrd has been described by the Los Angeles Times as "the guard dog to the pit bull."

== Salary, raise non-negotiation, and contract renewals ==
By 1999, Sheindlin began earning salaries reflective of her court show's success. For every roughly three years from that point forward, Sheindlin handed over her salary wishes to CBS management representatives in a sealed envelope during contract renewals. She communicated her wishes as nonnegotiable, that otherwise she would take her talents elsewhere and produce the program herself.

In early 2000 during the show's 4th season, Sheindlin's annual salary from Judge Judy was reported as $7.8 million. In January 2003 during the 7th season, Sheindlin's annual salary was increased to $25 million when she signed a contract to preside over Judge Judy through its 10th season (2005–06). For the first time, she was put in the top pay ranks for TV performers. In September 2005, just before Sheindlin's 10th season anniversary, it was reported that her contract was extended 2 seasons further, promising the program through its 12th season (2007–08). As part of the deal, Sheindlin's annual salary would be increased to $30 million for the then-upcoming 2 seasons. In January 2008 (during show's 12th season), Sheindlin's annual salary was increased to $45 million when her contract was renewed through the 2013-14 television season (its 17th season).

Her next contract renewal, in May 2011 (during the show's 15th season), saw her program extended to the 2014–15 television season (the show's 19th) and Sheindlin's Judge Judy salary increase to its peak of $47 million. Sheindlin's courtroom series brought in $230 million in advertising in 2012. Sheindlin's $47 million per year Judge Judy salary translated into just over $900,000 per workday (she worked 52 days per year), reportedly making her the highest paid television star in 2013 and 2014.

Sheindlin's next Judge Judy contract renewal signing with CBS was in March 2015 during the 19th season of her program. As part of the annual $47 million contract deal, Sheindlin acquired ownership of the Judge Judy episode library (including all past and then future episodes) in exchange for extending the program to its 24th season. The renewal also included a first-look production deal for CBS with Sheindlin's television production company, Queen Bee Productions (which produces syndicated courtroom series Hot Bench), allowing CBS to have first viewing exposure to any material that her production company engineered.

Sheindlin's final contract renewal signing with CBS was in August 2017 (late in the show's 21st season), extending the show for one additional season to its 25th. The terms of the agreement also included Sheindlin's submission of the Judge Judy episode library back to CBS, which has allegedly furnished Sheindlin with an additional annual income of $100 million. The move allows CBS to replay the show (at the time, as many as 5,200 episodes) without limitations on any platform they choose. Before Sheindlin's alleged contractual sell of the episode library back to CBS, she reportedly had her team shop the episode library around the entertainment industry for a much higher amount, as much as $200 million annually.

Forbes named Sheindlin the highest paid host in November 2018 stemming from her $47 million per year Judge Judy salary combined with the annual income from her Judge Judy episode library. In 2018, Sheindlin earned $147 million between the $100 million from the alleged sale of the present and then future episode library of her show to CBS, in addition to her $47 million arbitration handling salary. In 2020 and 2021, Sheindlin's net worth was reportedly $440 million and $460 million, respectively.

== Reception ==
=== Nielsen ratings by seasons for series original run (1996–2021) ===
1996–1998

When Judge Judy launched in September 1996, it went on the air with little media attention and publicity. By the end of October of that year, the show was averaging only a 1.5 rating, putting it in the mid-rank of the 159 syndicated shows on the air. At that time, it was never expected that the show's ratings would ever compete with highly successful daytime TV shows of that era, such as The Oprah Winfrey Show, The Rosie O'Donnell Show and The Jerry Springer Show. According to Biography's documentary film on Sheindlin, "Judge Judy: Sitting in Judgment" (aired February 21, 2000), producers of Judge Judy were disappointed that the show was barely making it on the radar. However, it did not take long for the court show to pick up momentum as Judge Judy rose to a 2.1 rating by the end of that first season. By the starting point of her 2nd season, it was observed that Sheindlin's guest presence at public venues had already generated avid recognition and fanfare, her reaction characterized as "overwhelmed by her success, as if it was something she didn't expect." Season 2 (1997–98) of the program saw the court show already rise into the 4 ratings ranges, averaging a 4.3.

The 3rd season (1998–99) of Judge Judy was the show's first season as the highest-rated program in daytime television, having surpassed the highly rated Jerry Springer Show and even then daytime powerhouse The Oprah Winfrey Show for the first time (King World Productions which launched Oprah was folded into CBS Television Distribution in 2007, which distributed Judge Judy): the program's ratings more than doubled to a 5.6 for that season, marking Judge Judy as an early success.

It was due, in part, to this early success that daytime television began to feature more court programming, such as a revival of The People's Court that re-debuted in fall 1997. In 1999, Judge Judy moved from Worldvision Enterprises to Paramount Domestic Television, which also distributed her stablemate Judge Joe Brown and eventually Judge Mills Lane. Many other former judges were given their own court shows in syndication due in large part to Sheindlin's popularity. Examples include Greg Mathis, Glenda Hatchett, Alex Ferrer, Maria Lopez, Karen Mills-Francis, Cristina Perez, David Young, and many others. In addition, the series helped to spawn various nontraditional court programs. These include the reality-based revival of Divorce Court, which was originally presided over by Mablean Ephriam (1999–2006), Lynn Toler (2006–2020), Faith Jenkins (2020–2022), and currently helmed by Star Jones; the short-lived Power of Attorney, capturing various high-profile attorneys arguing cases for litigants in front of Andrew Napolitano; Street Court, which took litigation outside of the courtroom; Jury Duty, featuring an all-celebrity jury hearing cases presided over by Bruce Cutler; etc. Furthermore, Judge Judy's rise in popularity enabled several non-real-life judges to preside over courts, such as Nancy Grace, Larry Joe Doherty, and Gloria Allred.

Also, partly due to Judge Judy's popularity, the producers of the revival of The People's Court decided to replace Ed Koch, who had presided over the series since its 1997 return, with Judy's husband, Jerry Sheindlin, as their presiding judge at the beginning of its third season in 1999. The experiment, however, did not last long; Jerry Sheindlin was let go from The People's Court after one and a half seasons and replaced with Marilyn Milian, who presided over the proceedings until the series was cancelled in 2023.

1999–2006

For its 4th season (1999–2000), Judy's ratings rose to its highest for its 25 season lifespan, peaking at a 9.3 rating. At this point, Sheindlin's courtroom series was still the highest rated program in daytime. It was also at this point that Judge Judy held a record of increasing its ratings for each successive season since its debut. Because of the program's success, Judge Judy began airing at better time periods.

It was by the show's 5th season (2000–01) that Judy's streak of growing in ratings from season to season since its debut had ceased. However, the court show still remained the highest-rated program in daytime that season with a 5.6 rating. By the 6th season (2001–02), Judy was no longer the highest-rated program in daytime, beaten out by The Oprah Winfrey Show. The court show averaged a 5.0 rating that season. Likewise, for her 7th season (2002–03), she also averaged a 5.0. For her 8th season (2003–04), Sheindlin finally reversed the season-to-season downward turn in her ratings by averaging a 7.1. Of the seven running court shows during the 2004–05 season, most of them earned a 3.63 rating; however, Judge Judy remained court genre leader with a 7.5 ratings score for that season (the show's 9th). For her 10th season (2005–06), Judge Judy averaged a 4.8 rating. Judge Judy averaged 4.6 rating for her 11th season (2006–07). Meanwhile, other programs in the genre were trailing Sheindlin from a vast distance: Judge Joe Brown averaged a 2.9 rating; The People's Court averaged a 2.7; Judge Mathis averaged a 2.4; Divorce Court averaged a 2.0; Judge Alex averaged 1.9; Judge Hatchett averaged a 1.5; rookies—Cristina's Court averaged a 1.4, and Judge Maria Lopez came in last, averaging a 1.0 rating.

2007–2012

For its 12th season (2007–08), Judge Judy averaged a 4.8 rating (4.8 HH AA%/7.4 HH GAA% rating) and 9.9 million average daily viewers. Judy was the only first-run syndication program to increase in ratings for that season from the previous, leading CBS to immediately extend her contract through the 2012–13 season. For its 13th season (2008–09), the show averaged a 4.2 rating (4.2 HH AA%/6.5 HH GAA% rating) and 9.02 million average daily viewers. Its 14th season (2009–10) marked the first season in nearly a decade since the 2000–01 season that any daytime television program had been able to surpass The Oprah Winfrey Show's ratings (Judge Judy is also the show in question that during the 2000–01 television season surpassed The Oprah Winfrey Show in daytime TV ratings): Judy broke Winfrey's near decade-long streak with a 4.4 rating (4.4 HH AA%/6.9 HH GAA% rating) and 9.6 million average daily viewers. It was also at that point that Sheindlin's courtroom series became the highest rated show in all of daytime television programming. Judy secured this title in its 15th season (2010–11) as the program remained ahead of Oprah in her [Oprah] final season and the highest-rated daytime television offering, averaging a 5.11 rating and 9.6 million viewers. During this season, Judy also became the highest rated show in first-run syndication. Late that same season in May 2011, as a result of continued high ratings, CBS again extended Sheindlin's contract, this time through the 2014–15 season (the show's 19th).

In the first post-Oprah television season, the court show continued its reign as the most dominant show in daytime and also became the top-rated show in all of syndication, its 16th season (2011–12) racking up a 7.0 rating and 9.29 million average daily viewers. As the top-rated show in all of syndication at this point, Sheindlin defeated first-run syndication programs and off-network syndication programs (rerun episodes of programs off their original network). The title of overall syndication leader was previously held by off-network syndicated program Two and a Half Men (2010–11) and before that, first-run syndicated program Wheel of Fortune (2009–10).

Judge Judy's ratings boost in its 16th season and late into the show's 15th season was at least partly due to Nielsen's change in methodology, in April 2011. This variation benefits programs that air multiple, differing episodes a day. The updated method is totalling ratings points through adding all viewings for each daily episode–even if one of those viewings come from an individual already counted in as having watched another of the show's daily episodes. For example, as Judge Judy airs two different episodes per day, two ratings points are counted for every one person who has watched both the first and second daily airings. This is as opposed to one person's viewing of the two daily episodes amounting to only one ratings point. Prior to the convert, the latest method was only used in GAA numbers, while the previous method was used in average audience measure. Some court shows air in one hour blocks and thus do not benefit at all from the updated method. Worth noting, however, is that shows airing multiple daily episodes may not directly benefit monetarily as the rating system that local stations use to sell to advertisers is based upon the prior method.

2012–2016

For its 17th season (2012–13), Judge Judy once again pulled in a 7.0 household rating. The series delivered 9.63 million average daily viewers that season, growing by +32,000 viewers over the prior season. Despite this, Judy lost its 1st place spot as the ratings leader in all of syndication that season, descending to 2nd place, only a tad behind The Big Bang Theory (off-network syndicate) which took home a 7.1 for that season. Still and all, this was the 3rd season in a row that Judy earned the title of ratings leader in all of first-run syndication. Moreover, this was the 4th consecutive season that Judy was the ratings leader in all of daytime television programming. For the 18th season (2013–14), Judy rose to a 7.2 household rating and brought in 9.94 million viewers, gaining 8% over its prior season. Also for this season, the show reclaimed the title as highest rated program in all of daytime (5th consecutive time, 8th time overall) and all of syndication (3rd time). The show's 19th season (2014–15) pulled in a 7.0 household rating and remained the highest rated program in both daytime television as well as all of syndication. The 20th season (2015–16) was Judy's 3rd consecutive year as syndication's top strip, the court show averaging a 7.0 full-season household rating.

2016–2021

For its 21st season (2016–17), Judge Judy scored a 6.8 household rating for its 21st season. For the 22nd season (2017–18), Judy attained a 6.9 live plus same day household average, well ahead of anything else in syndication. It marked the show's 5th straight year as the leader in all of syndication ratings and the 9th straight year as the leader in first-run syndication ratings. For the 23rd season (2018–19), it was reported by Nielsen that Judy topped first-run syndication ratings for the 10th straight year with 6.8 household rating. According to Nielsen's ratings, the court show finished out its penultimate season (2019–20) at the top of first-run syndication for an 11th straight year, Judy taking home a 6.2 household rating. The program's closest competitors were Family Feud at 6.1, Jeopardy! at 6.0, and Wheel of Fortune at 5.8. Going out on top for its 25th anniversary, Judge Judy had its 12th year as top Nielsen rated program in first-run syndication, ending its run with an estimated 7.8 million viewers for that final season (2020–21). Judge Judy also lasted its entire 25 year first-run as the highest Nielsen rated court show, outperforming all other courtroom series broadcasts and by vast margins.

=== Pioneering effect, longevity and accolades ===
Judge Judy, which premiered on September 16, 1996, reportedly revitalized the court show genre. Acclaiming the program's impacts on courtroom television programming, Daytime Emmy Awards Senior Vice President and Executive Producer David Michaels was quoted as stating, "Daytime television wouldn't be what it is today without Judy Sheindlin. Judge Judy redefined and reinvigorated the courtroom format propelling the genre to new heights." Only two other arbitration-based reality court shows preceded it, The People's Court (its first 12-season incarnation canceled in 1993 from low ratings) and Jones & Jury (lasting only the 1994–95 season, short-lived from low ratings). Sheindlin has been credited with introducing the "tough" adjudicating approach into the judicial genre, which has led to several imitators.

The only two court shows that outnumber Judge Judy's seasons, The People's Court and Divorce Court, have both built longevity on series cancellations/revival reincarnations and multitudes of judge-role recasting moves (in its pre-1999 form, the latter program was scripted via court transcripts of past proceedings). Thus Sheindlin's span as a television jurist or arbitrator has lasted longer than any other—a distinction that earned her a place in the Guinness World Records in September 2015. With no cancellations or temporary endings in its series run, Judge Judy also had the longest-lasting individual production life of any court show during its entire run. With Judge Judy off the air, The People's Court's current/2nd production incarnation now has the longest single production continuance of any court show, having reached 26 seasons by the 2022-23 television year—though having gone through 3 judges during this 26 year production incarnation.

Starring on Judge Judy earned Sheindlin a star on the Hollywood Walk of Fame in February 2006, the Gracie Allen Tribute Award from the Alliance for Women in Media in 2006, induction into Broadcasting & Cable's Hall of Fame in October 2012, election as vice president of the UCD Law Society in April 2013, and given the Mary Pickford Award by the Hollywood Chamber Community Foundation at the 2014 Heroes of Hollywood.

By 2011, Sheindlin's series had been nominated for 14 consecutive years for the Daytime Emmy Award without ever winning. While part of that 14 years had the court show categorized into other television genre categories by the Emmys, it also includes failures to win once the Outstanding Legal/Courtroom Daytime Emmy category was introduced in 2008. By 2012, an article from the New York Post reported that Judge Judy was snubbed by the award show in having never won and not even being nominated into the Outstanding Legal/Courtroom Emmy category that year—despite Judy's status as highest Nielsen-rated court show for its entire series run. In a followup interview with Entertainment Tonight on May 3, 2013, Sheindlin was questioned about the "snub" and her court show's failure to ever win up to that point, responding:

I don't know. You know, somehow it would sort of break the spell. The show has been such a tremendous success that I'm almost afraid to think about winning—because so many of those [court] shows that did win are no longer with us. So I say to myself 'you want the Emmy or you want a job? (laughing) Which one do you want?'

On June 14, 2013, however, Judge Judy won its first Daytime Emmy for Outstanding Legal/Courtroom Program, having received its 15th nomination. The program won again in 2016 and 2017.

=== Audience makeup ===
Judge Judy's daytime audience was reportedly composed of approximately seventy-five percent women and twenty-five percent men. In February 2014, it was reported that Judge Judy's audience was mostly composed of older women, African Americans and Latinos.

=== Criticisms ===
Despite her widespread acclaim, Sheindlin's behavior and treatment of the parties that have appeared before her have often been the subject of criticism. Regular viewers of the program have also been criticized as "sadistic" for their delight in watching Sheindlin engage in her typical behaviors. One such example of criticism has come from the first star of arbitration-based reality court shows, Joseph Wapner. Wapner, who presided over The People's Court from 1981 to 1993, was a long-time critic of Sheindlin. On November 26, 2002, Wapner criticized Judge Judy's courtroom behavior, stating "She is not portraying a judge as I view a judge should act. Judge Judy is discourteous, and she's abrasive. She's not slightly insulting. She's insulting in capital letters."

Judge Judy replied through her publicist, stating, "I refuse to engage in similar mud slinging. I don't know where or by whom Judge Wapner was raised. But my parents taught me when you don't have something nice to say about someone, say nothing. Clearly, Judge Wapner was absent on the day that lesson was taught."

Since then, Wapner has stated, "She is a disgrace to the profession. She does things I don't think a judge should do. She tells people to shut up. She's rude. She's arrogant. She demeans people. If she does this on purpose, then that's even worse. Judges need to observe certain standards of conduct. She just doesn't do it and I resent that. The public is apt to gain the impression that this is how actual judges conduct themselves. It says 'judge' on the nameplate on the bench and she's wearing a robe."

Sheindlin later stated, "As a young person, when I had watched The People's Court. . . I said 'you know what, I could do that.' And at least as well because while Joe Wapner is a very good judge, [he] didn't have much of a sense of humor. And I always knew from a very practical perspective that you have to marry those two things in order to be successful in entertainment."

In a November 2013 interview with Larry King, Sheindlin was asked whether she enjoyed watching Wapner on The People's Court. She replied, "Meh! Oatmeal!" Following this, King asked her what if any other television judges then did she enjoy, to which Sheindlin answered "Mills Lane" of Judge Mills Lane.

=== Acclaim ===
In a September 2014, Rickey Smiley Morning Show interview, Greg Mathis of Judge Mathis (second longest reigning court show arbitrator, three seasons behind Sheindlin during her Judge Judy series run) was asked what three other court show judges he'd most enjoy sharing a meal with. For his first choice, he answered (laughing) "Are you kidding?! It would be Judge Judy at the head of the table. Oh my goodness, that Judge Judy is something else." His second choice was Judge Marilyn Milian, and his third was Judge Mills Lane.

In August 2010, rapper, singer, and songwriter Nicki Minaj stated that one of her favorite television programs is Judge Judy and when asked what she likes to do in her spare time, she replied that one of her favorite things to do is watch Judge Judy's show.

In February 2013, the head football coach for the San Francisco 49ers, Jim Harbaugh, was asked about the importance of truthfulness and enthusiastically remarked, "Somebody that's not truthful? That's big to me. I'm a big fan of the Judge Judy show. When you lie in Judge Judy's courtroom, it's over. Your credibility is completely lost, and you stand no chance of winning that case. So I learned that from her. It's very powerful and true. If somebody lies to you, how can you trust anything they ever say after that?"

A couple of months later, Harbaugh would even attend tapings of Judge Judy along with his father as audience members. As part of the experience, Harbaugh and his father had lunch with Sheindlin and visited with her both before and after tapings. After meeting Sheindlin and seeing cases in person, Harbaugh stated, "I've never seen Judy adjudicate one improperly. She is so smart. She is so good. I could sit there and watch those cases all day. I really could. It's fun to watch somebody that does their job well. I could watch Judge Judy do cases all day. I could watch people play football who do their job really well. People who direct traffic. I get a real kick out of watching people who direct traffic do it. I've done it for hours. I like football the most, but Judge Judy is right up there. She's the best."

Brad Adgate, senior vice president of research for Horizon Media, said "Judge Judy is the new Oprah of daytime TV-actually, she was [already] beating Oprah while Oprah was still on."

While he was President and CEO of CBS Corporation, Leslie Moonves stated, "Over the last few decades, there have been very few shows that have achieved the remarkable success that she has. Not only has Judy sustained that success year after year, how many shows grow in their 15th or 16th year in syndication? She started as a fresh voice and she's been a remarkable presence in daytime television ever since."

Many regular viewers and supporters of Judge Judy had defended Sheindlin's treatment of the parties that have appeared before her by describing the parties as an "endless parade of idiots" that Sheindlin had to put up with.

== Lawsuits ==
Judge Judy Executive producer Randy Douthit had been sued numerous times by former staff members of the Judge Judy program for alleged wrongful termination, discriminatory practice, mismanagement, etc., while on the job. While only two of those lawsuits went public during the course of the show's original run, many other lawsuits and allegations against Douthit were brought to light following the program's conclusion.

=== Ageism lawsuit ===
On November 13, 2007, the show's former associate producer Karen Needle was fired. She later sued Douthit, claiming that she was wrongfully terminated because she was too old, 64 at the time. Sheindlin was not named as a defendant. Needle, who helped book audiences for the program, stated the reason she was given for being fired was "unspecified conflict from her audience work." Needle said she began suffering from back pain, sometimes even resorting to lying on the ground in pain, and when she asked her bosses for a new chair, nothing was done.

According to the complaint, two weeks before Needle was fired, she took off four days to assist her ailing 88-year-old mother. Needle later stated, "There is a lot of terrible stuff going on if two people file separate lawsuits (referencing Jonathan Sebastien's suit). It's a toxic situation over there. This is supposed to be Judge Judy, the voice of justice, and yet her own staff isn't treated well. What is she getting paid all that money for if her own staff is treated with such little decency?" The case was dismissed following a jury trial on January 26, 2009.

=== Racism termination lawsuit ===
On December 26, 2007, Jonathan Sebastien, a former producer of the Judge Judy show of seven years, filed a lawsuit against the production company in L.A. County Superior Court for wrongful termination. Sebastien claimed that when he proposed certain cases for the show involving Black litigants, Douthit turned them down with his alleged reasons being he did not want to see any more Black people; their behaviors were too ghetto and more suited for former television jurist Joe Brown; and they needed more pretty, upscale White people.

Sebastien claimed that in January 2007, he objected to the alleged discrimination in a meeting and was verbally abused by Douthit. Three months later on March 30, Sebastien stated he was fired with the reason given that rating numbers were down. Sebastien claimed that the real reason he was fired was that he opposed his boss's alleged "discriminatory selection process". On June 26, 2009, Sebastian filed a request for dismissal with the courts after a settlement was offered to him by the defendant for an undisclosed amount.

=== Conspiracy/fraud allegations ===
In March 2013, a lawsuit was filed against Sheindlin by Patrice Jones, the ex-wife of Douthit. Jones alleged Douthit and Sheindlin had conspired to permit Sheindlin to buy Christofle fine china and Marly cutlery owned by Jones. She said Sheindlin had paid Douthit $50,815 for the items without her knowledge to deprive her of her valuables, and she sought $514,421 from Sheindlin. The suit ended after Sheindlin returned the tableware to Douthit and Jones agreed to pay Douthit $12,500 and have the tableware handed back to her.

=== Copyright infringement lawsuit by production against YouTube user ===
On October 17, 2013, Big Ticket Television and the producers of Judge Judy filed a lawsuit against Ignacio De Los Angeles for posting an episode of Judge Judy on YouTube and ignoring the command to remove it.

=== Publicity rights lawsuit filed by Judge Judy Sheindlin ===
On March 12, 2014, Sheindlin filed a lawsuit against Hartford, Connecticut, personal injury lawyer John Haymond, and his firm. In the lawsuit, Sheindlin accused Haymond and his firm of using her television image without consent in advertisements that falsely suggested she endorsed him and his firm. In March 2013, Sheindlin's producer allegedly told the firm that the use of her image was not permitted, but ads continued. The lawsuit filed in federal court sought more than $75,000 in damages. Sheindlin said in her statement that any money she wins through the lawsuit will go toward college scholarships through the Her Honor Mentoring Program. Sheindlin described the unauthorized use of her name as "outrageous", stating, "Mr. Haymond is a lawyer and should know better."

Haymond later filed a countersuit for punitive damages and attorney's fees, alleging defamation of him and his firm by Sheindlin. Haymond insisted that local affiliates asked him to appear in Judge Judy promos to promote Sheindlin for which he obliged. On August 8, 2014, it was reported that the case between Sheindlin and Haymond settled out of court in a resolution that favored Sheindlin. Haymond will be donating money to Sheindlin's charity, Her Honor Mentoring Program.

=== Contract breach lawsuits by Rebel Entertainment ===
On March 14, 2016, talent agency Rebel Entertainment Partners Inc. and its president, Richard Lawrence, filed a multimillion-dollar lawsuit against CBS Television Distribution, claiming the media giant failed to pay the agency its contractually-agreed-to share of the show's profits, totaling millions of dollars. Rebel claimed they were owed for their contributions to launching the program and introducing Sheindlin and CBS through their terminated employees Kaye Switzer and Sandi Spreckman. The lawsuit alleged that CBS hadn't paid Rebel for the past six years, claiming that the show operated at a loss primarily due to Sheindlin's annual salary boost to $45 and then $47 million.

The lawsuit went on to attack Sheindlin's salary as being far too high. Rebel described it as "exorbitant" and "grossly inconsistent with customary practice in the television industry" and claimed that similarly successful talk show hosts weren't paid nearly as much. Further, Rebel claimed they were entitled to be consulted before any spin-offs of the show were produced, but were not when Hot Bench (another courtroom-arbitrated show) was launched by Sheindlin and her producers in 2014. In response to the lawsuit, Sheindlin had stated:

The fact that Richard Lawrence is complaining about my salary is actually hilarious. I met Mr. Lawrence for 2 hours some 21 years ago. Neither I nor anyone involved in the day-to-day production of my program has heard from him in 20 years. Not a card, not a gift, not a flower, not a congratulations. Yet he has somehow received over $17,000,000 from my program. My rudimentary math translates that into $8,500,000 an hour for Mr. Lawrence. Not a bad payday. Now complaining about not getting enough money, that's real chutzpah.

When Sheindlin was deposed for the case in the summer of 2016, she said "CBS had no choice but to pay me what I wanted because otherwise I could take it wherever I wanted to take it or do it myself. Their backs to the wall. They pay me the money that they do because they have no choice. They can't find another one."

In an April 2018 verdict on this case, Los Angeles Superior Court Judge Joanne O'Donnell found that Sheindlin was not grossly overpaid and that her salary did not constitute a breach of contract, rather her salary is a result of the "resounding success of her program and without its namesake star would not continue". That being said, Judge O'Donnell ruled partially in Rebel's favor, agreeing that it was a breach of contract for the defendants to have failed to consult Lawrence before launching the "spin-off" series, Hot Bench. Dissatisfied with being granted one part of their motion while denying the other, Bryan Freedman (Lawrence's attorney) stated that the plaintiffs intended to appeal Judge O'Donnell's verdict. Freedman was quoted as stating, "As for admitting and then ignoring Rebel's uncontroverted expert opinion evidence that frontloading the 45 million dollar salary of Ms. Sheindlin was not consistent with the United States television industry, the court committed a reversible error. That issue will be decided by the court of appeal."

Although CBS attempted to come to a settlement with Rebel Entertainment in February 2020, Rebel issued a second and simultaneous lawsuit in early August 2020 that named not only ViacomCBS as a defendant but Sheindlin as well. The lawsuit filing was for more than $5 million over Sheindlin's submitting the show's profitable episode library back over to CBS (CBS previously granted Sheindlin the episode library in March 2015 as part of a Judge Judy contract renewal deal), Rebel alleging this exchange as a "sell" that they never benefited financially from. That same month, Sheindlin and her attorneys filed a countersuit for $22 million against Rebel Entertainment over unlawful/unfair business practices and unjust enrichment. Sheindlin promised to donate to a cancer charity any money that she won in the lawsuit. In February 2021, Judge Richard Burdge ruled that legal protocols enforced Sheindlin to name CBS as a defendant along with Rebel if she wished to pursue her countersuit. Sheindlin refused and thus her counterclaim was dismissed. On June 12, 2021, it was reported that Sheindlin and her attorneys' demurrer to have Rebel's over $5 million lawsuit dismissed through summary judgment (a verdict rendered early so that a case doesn't have to go to trial) was denied by Los Angeles Superior Court Judge Patricia Nieto. When asked to share her thoughts about this ruling, Sheindlin remarked, "Richard Lawrence has garnered 22 plus million dollars [from my program], although I have seen him only once in an elevator since our program began 25 years ago. I look forward to a trial". In September 2022, another Los Angeles Superior Court judge, Kristin Escalante, granted a motion by Sheindlin and ViacomCBS to have Rebel's two-year-old, over $5 million lawsuit dismissed. Following their court loss, however, Rebel Attorney Freedman remarked on how they intend to keep appealing failed lawsuits until Lawrence gets what he wants.

On July 30, 2021, the California Courts of Appeal upheld Judge Joanne O'Donnell's 2018 ruling that CBS did not breach its contract with Rebel by increasing Sheindlin's salary to $45 million (and later $47 million), consequently zeroing out Rebel's earnings at around the same time in 2009. At the crux of the legal hearing was the contract agreement signed by CBS and Rebel in 1995 when Rebel sold CBS the court show. The contract that was signed outlined that CBS would compensate Rebel 5% of gross proceeds from Judge Judy for the duration of its series run, but minus production expenses.

CBS contended that profit share deductions were a direct result of production expenses, that is, Sheindlin's intent to terminate employment with the network if her salary demands weren't met. Sheindlin corroborated these claims in her testimony, stating that she laid down rigid salary terms for CBS every three years otherwise resignation. The court rejected Rebel's legal claim and granted CBS a summary judgment, finding that CBS Television Distribution properly deducted profits from Rebel Entertainment as a production expense.

==== Added contract breach lawsuit filed by ex-employees of Rebel ====
On January 19, 2018, a breach-of-contract lawsuit—similar and loosely related to the case filed by Rebel Entertainment—was filed in the Los Angeles Superior Court against Sheindlin, CBS Corporation, CBS Studios, and Big Ticket Television by Kaye Switzer, and the trust of the now deceased Sandi Spreckman. Switzer and Spreckman are former employees of Rebel Entertainment, terminated by the employer. Switzer and Spreckman's trustee, Jay Robinson, claimed they "discovered" and introduced Sheindlin to producer Larry Little, asserting that if not for this move that there never would have been any Judge Judy and thus they were owed monetary royalties for the entirety of the court show's series run. The lawsuit also claimed that Sheindlin sold "The Judge Judy Library" (a collection of all episodes of Judge Judy) to CBS Television Distribution for over $95,000,000. Switzer and the Spreckman's trustee contend that they were not paid any monetary royalties by Sheindlin, CBS, or Big Ticket related to this transaction. The two women have a long history of filing lawsuits over the same matter against Sheindlin and CBS dating back to the year 2000.

An insider claimed that Sheindlin was not concerned about the lawsuit, regards the subject of "who is owed what as just background noise", and believed that the success of her show came from nothing more than the "sweat of her brow" and the force of her personality. According to the same insider, Sheindlin said that while she "was always fond of Kaye and Sandi", the pair were terminated by Rebel Entertainment before her show ever even made it on the air and that she "never entered a contract with Kaye and Sandi personally."

In March 2021, defendants Judith Sheindlin, Big Ticket Pictures, Her Honor, and CBS Studios petitioned the courts for a summary judgment (an early verdict from a judge based on enough evidence gathered during discovery so that a case does not have to move to trial). In February 2022, the court granted the defendants their petition for a summary judgment, effectively dismissing the case filed by plaintiffs Switzer and the trust of Spreckman. The defendants contended that the plaintiffs were unable to prove that any money was earned by Sheindlin for her submission of the Judge Judy episode library back to CBS, adding that details of the contract regarding that exchange have been kept confidential through contractual protections. To that end, in August 2017 when CBS Television Distribution President at that time, Paul Franklin, shared the news that Sheindlin submitted her Judge Judy episode library back to CBS, Franklin was quoted as describing the exchange as CBS "acquiring" the episode library as opposed to "buying" the episode library.

== Series departure details ==
In February 2020, CBS attempted to come to a settlement with Rebel Entertainment (despite this, there have been numerous additional failed attempts at winning lawsuits filed against Sheindlin and ViacomCBS by Rebel, even for a period after the show ran). Less than a week after CBS's February 2020 settlement attempt with Rebel, Sheindlin announced on The Ellen DeGeneres Show that her Judge Judy series would end that following television year, 2020–21, at 25 seasons. In announcing this news, Sheindlin also shared that she would prepare to shop a new spin-off series, Judy Justice, around to other distributors. The news of Sheindlin announcing the end of her series caught CBS off guard. Although CBS had some idea that the show would conclude at around 25 seasons, nothing was set in stone. Sheindlin later signed a deal with Amazon Studios to stream the new Judy Justice court show. The deal with Amazon allows Sheindlin full ownership rights over her new program and what was described as a lucrative salary—Sheindlin stated that salary negotiations were effortless because of how public her $47 million Judge Judy salary and $440 million net worth (for the year 2020) were. According to later released media reports, Sheindlin's annual Judy Justice salary is 25 million.

After Judge Judy completed its series run at 25 seasons, the program officially ending on July 23, 2021, Sheindlin rationalized that "25 is a good round number" to go out on top with. In June 2021, however, Sheindlin issued public statements that her tensions with CBS and feeling disrespected by the network posed the basis for her show's end. According to reports, Sheindlin had taken exception to CBS's management of her program ever since the resignation of Les Moonves from the role as chief executive over the network in 2018, resulting from a multitude of scandals. In particular, Sheindlin resented CBS's ownership rights to the Judge Judy episode library, a position that allowed CBS to air numerous seasons of Judge Judy without having to pay Sheindlin as much for new episodes (at least as she had been receiving at that time, which was $47 million annually). Sheindlin further resented CBS's demotion of the court show Hot Bench in airing timeslots (a series that although does not feature Sheindlin, is produced and created by her).

Addressing her relationship with the network, Sheindlin commented, "We had a nice marriage. It's going to be a Bill and Melinda Gates divorce." In a formal press release response to Sheindlin's statements issued by CBS Ventures President Steven Locascio, he was quoted as stating, "The network has had an incredibly successful relationship with Judy over the last 25 years. It has been an honor representing her show, and just like there has never been another Oprah, there will never be another Judge Judy."

== Post-series run publicity ==
=== Fan criticism over Bailiff Byrd not returning for Judge Judy spin-off ===
Sheindlin's Judge Judy spin-off, Judy Justice, garnered significant criticism from disgruntled Judge Judy show fans and media outlets alike over Judge Judy program's Bailiff Byrd not returning to Sheindlin's side nor having any participation. According to sources close to Sheindlin's programs, the vast majority of her Judge Judy crew was invited back and treated well for the successor. Byrd, on the other hand, later revealed in October 2021 that when he finally had a discussion with Sheindlin by the time her new series was in production, she explained that he was omitted due to the show's budget, that they couldn't afford him. The discussion was also said to have resulted from Byrd having to call Sheindlin. Byrd expressed that he was "dismayed" and "perplexed" as no one had ever previously discussed the new series with him. In a public response to Byrd and Judge Judy fans, Sheindlin praised Byrd as "terrific", sharing that the two had a great 25-season run, but concluded that the new show required a fresh, exciting direction. Byrd ultimately expressed appreciation for the opportunities provided to him by Sheindlin, wishing her all the best with Judy Justice and stating to hold no grudges.

Byrd later added in November 2021 that he also felt snubbed by the Emmys when he was not allowed to present Sheindlin's Lifetime Achievement Award to her at the Daytime Emmy ceremony in 2019. Byrd stated that he was seated 15 to 20 rows back while Sheindlin sat with Judge Judy Executive Producer Randy Douthit in the front rows. Questioned about the matter, Sheindlin shared that it was Amy Poehler who called up the Television Academy and requested to present her with the award because she was a big fan. According to Byrd, however, Poehler later shared with him that she was equally perplexed over his exclusion from the ceremony.

On April 28, 2022, it was announced that Byrd would return to his televised bailiff duties for another courtroom series, entitled Tribunal. Sheindlin created the court show and produces it. Like Judy Justice, Tribunal is streamed on Amazon Freevee. The program is presided over by now former Hot Bench judges, Tanya Acker and Patricia DiMango, along with Sheindlin's son, former district attorney Adam Levy.

=== Toxic work environment allegations leveled at producer ===
While Judge Judy Sheindlin is not accused of any workplace misconduct, Judge Judy and Judy Justice Executive Producer Randy Douthit has come under fire over years of lawsuits and allegations about creating a toxic workplace behind the scenes of Judge Judy. Discovered were multitudes of allegations leveled at Douthit by 16 former Judge Judy producers that run the gamut, involving workplace drunkenness, sexual harassment, body shaming, ageism, ableism, anti-blackness and misogyny.

According to the allegations made by former Judge Judy staff dating back from 2001 through the remainder of the show's run, Douthit frequently sexually harassed employees who reported to him and reviled female litigants while directing from the control room, referring to them as "too fat", "too ugly", "hos", uttering pig and cow vocalizations, sharing of which of them he most desired to sleep with, etc. Judge Judy Producer Kurstin Haynes revealed, "He'd make comments about their weight, he'd make comments about their teeth, or if they were disabled." According to Judge Judy employees, the process of proposing cases to Douthit for his approval required submitting photography of the litigants involved. Several revealed that Douthit was particularly concerned with the teeth of the show's guests, employees citing getting into "big trouble" with Douthit over the selection of such "disgusting" litigants. Throughout Judge Judy's run, all lawsuits filed against Douthit were dismissed. However, when questioned about the various allegations, court filings quote Douthit as answering, "I don't believe so. I hope not. I may have, but I hope not."

According to a media publicized lawsuit filed against Douthit in 2009 by former Senior Producer Jonathan Sebastien, Douthit announced, "We're not doing any more Black shows. I don't want to hear Black people arguing." Asked whether he remembered telling producers to screen out Black litigants, court filings quote Douthit as answering that he could not recall. After objecting to Douthit's behavior, Sebastien was later fired, allegedly for that reason. Sebastien later reached a settlement for an undisclosed amount. In November 2021, six Judge Judy staffers confirmed Sebastien's claims, additionally alleging that this behavior from Douthit continued through season 25 in 2020–21. Douthit's lawyers have denied all charges, claiming that they emanate from disgruntled former employees, also citing Douthit as fostering a supportive, inclusive workplace. Sheindlin's leadership was consequently called into question, criticized over turning a blind eye to the matters and allowing Douthit as well as other allegedly problematic Judge Judy Executive Producers Amy Freisleben and Victoria Jenest to resume their roles in Judy Justice. Expressing resentment over how her leadership was portrayed in media reports, Sheindlin was quoted as stating:

To author a piece which speculates that I 'was untouchable,' 'don't care how the show gets made,' 'that I don't trust anyone,' 'didn't like cases involving dogs, dog bites or strippers,' 'by and large didn't interact with staffers,' 'wasn't worried about the coronavirus,' is appalling and untrue.

=== Success in post–series production reruns ===
In April 2022, it was computed that Judge Judy reruns have vastly outperformed Judy Justice season one (2021–22) in viewership quantities. It was also reported in August 2022 that with Judge Judy out of production for over a year by this point, the court show remained one of the highest-rated programs in all of daytime television and syndication. Moreover, the series still dominates the court show genre as the highest-rated broadcast and by significant margins. Questioned about her concluded court show's enduring success and timelessness in reruns during a November 2022 interview, Sheindlin answered, "My mind is still blown away by the fact, that in the second year of its afterlife, Judge Judy is still number one in daytime."
