= Spelling Television =

American television company

Spelling Television Inc.
- Production logo from 1992–2007; the CBS strapline was used from 2006–07 when the division was merged into CBS Studios.
- Formerly: Aaron Spelling Productions (1965–1989); Spelling Entertainment Inc. (1988–1992)
- Type: Subsidiary
- Traded as: NYSE: SP
- Industry: Television
- Founded: October 25, 1965; 61 years ago (as Aaron Spelling Productions)
- Founder: Aaron Spelling
- Defunct: May 13, 2007; 19 years ago
- Fate: Folded into CBS Paramount Television
- Successor: CBS Studios
- Headquarters: Los Angeles, California, United States
- Services: Television production
- Owner: Blockbuster (67%, 1993–1994); Viacom (67%, 1994–1999; 100%, 1999–2005); CBS Corporation (2005–2006)
- Parent: Spelling Entertainment Group (1991–1999); Paramount Television (1999–2006); CBS Paramount Television (2006–2007)
- Subsidiaries: Worldvision Enterprises (1989–1999); Laurel Entertainment; Spelling Films International; Torand Productions; Big Ticket Television; Virgin Interactive Entertainment (1994–1998)

Spelling Television Inc. was an American television production company that went through several name changes. It was originally called Aaron Spelling Productions, then Spelling Entertainment Inc. and eventually part of Spelling Entertainment Group. The company produced popular shows such as The Love Boat, Dynasty, Beverly Hills, 90210, 7th Heaven, Melrose Place and Charmed. The company was founded by television producer Aaron Spelling on October 25, 1965. The company is currently an in-name-only unit of CBS Studios, and its television library is owned by CBS' parent company Skydance.

A related company, Spelling-Goldberg Productions, co-existed during a portion of the same time period and produced other well-known shows such as Family, Charlie's Angels, Starsky & Hutch, and Fantasy Island, but these series are part of the Sony Pictures Television library as they were produced in association with Columbia Pictures Television.

Another related company, The Douglas S. Cramer Company co-existed during a portion of the same time period (held by Douglas S. Cramer, who held the position as Executive VP), produced shows like Wonder Woman, Joe and Sons, and Bridget Loves Bernie and television films like Dawn: Portrait of a Teenage Runaway.

== Background ==
On October 25, 1965, after his exit from Four Star Television as a staff writer prior to becoming a producer, Aaron Spelling formed his own company Aaron Spelling Productions, with a two-year exclusive agreement at United Artists Television.

Thomas-Spelling Productions was a television production company formed by comedian Danny Thomas and producer Aaron Spelling on April 15, 1966, as a partnership with 24 properties. The company adopted its name by July 18, 1966, when it announced the financial involvement of ABC with its first show, Range (later Rango), a half-hour comedy western starring Tim Conway. ABC also picked up another show for a pilot, just in an outline treatment, in The Guns of Will Sonnett. Thomas-Spelling Productions' active operations ended with the last season of The Mod Squad in 1972, with Spelling forming a new partnership with Leonard Goldberg, called Spelling-Goldberg Productions.

== History ==
Spelling, who was still involved with Thomas-Spelling Productions, signed an exclusive deal with ABC via Aaron Spelling Productions for television series and feature films.

In the late 1970s and early 1980s, Spelling was called king in television. In 1982, Aaron Spelling Productions struck a deal with Warner Bros. Television Distribution for worldwide syndication rights to future Spelling productions. In 1984, Spelling had seven shows for the ABC television network, accounting for one-third their prime time schedule. This outweighed other production companies by a large margin, leading many industry insiders to dub ABC as "Aaron's Broadcasting Company". Spelling himself was never amused with this name.

Aaron Spelling Productions went public in 1986 after raising $80 million. In May 1987, Spelling decided to expand into feature production, with five projects already in the works for different studios, and four projects ASP is heading up for the development slate. On August 17, 1987, Spelling extended its contract with ABC for three more years. On September 28, 1987, Spelling's arrangement with ABC became non-exclusive as it was signed a deal to other networks. In 1988, Aaron Spelling Productions acquired Laurel Entertainment and most of the Taft Entertainment Company, including Worldvision Enterprises, Inc. All three companies became part of Spelling Entertainment Inc. – though Worldvision was the only Taft division to continue operating. The sale was completed on March 1, 1989. In 1990, the company started Spelling Films International as a distributor for feature films such as feature film financing.

In the early 1990s, Beverly Hills, 90210 and Melrose Place helped propel Fox even higher and reach a new generation of young teen viewers. Sunset Beach was Spelling's first and only foray into the daytime soap opera genre and whilst short lived, was incredibly popular abroad. Also in the 1990s the WB was launched and their longest running, highest rated and most successful show during their time in operation was 7th Heaven for ten seasons. By 2006, another new network, The CW, used 7th Heaven in their first season in operation as the newest network; 7th Heaven, in fact, turned out to be the last network broadcast series produced by Spelling Television. Spelling's ABC, Fox, and WB shows were enormously successful for the company and they wasted no time entering into the world of merchandise in the 1980s and 1990s. The company also was one of the first production companies to actively run a website for a show they produced, when the internet was just taking off in the 1990s. The website was for Melrose Place.

Spelling Entertainment Inc. was acquired by Charter Company on April 6, 1991. On March 31, 1992, Spelling and Charter announced a merger agreement. On October 5, 1992, Charter changed its name to Spelling Entertainment Group Inc. and updated its NYSE ticker symbol to SP. On October 5, 1993, Blockbuster, Inc. acquired a controlling stake in Spelling Entertainment Group. On April 28, 1994, Spelling Entertainment acquired Republic Pictures for $100 million.

=== Viacom acquisition ===
On September 29, 1994, Blockbuster merged with Viacom. Blockbuster by then owned 67% of Spelling Entertainment. After the merger, Spelling Entertainment integrated Worldvision into their Republic Pictures unit, thus dismantling Worldvision as a production company. Worldvision distribution functions continued until 1999, when it was folded into Paramount Domestic Television that year and assumed distribution functions (Viacom had bought Paramount Communications – formerly Gulf+Western – the parent of Paramount Pictures and its television division, in 1994).

In 1995, Viacom attempted to sell its then-78% share of Spelling. One reason was that they wanted to recoup the debt incurred from buying Paramount Communications. Also, they felt that the operations of Spelling Television was too similar to its Paramount Television division. Potential bids came from PolyGram, New World Entertainment, and News Corporation. These plans were called off in 1996 as Viacom could not find the perfect bidder. The remainder of Spelling Entertainment was then acquired by Viacom on June 23, 1999.

Before the merger with Viacom, most of Spelling's shows were distributed by Worldvision, with older Spelling shows distributed by several others including Columbia Pictures Television, Warner Bros. Television and 20th Television.

The company's first home was a suite of offices on the old Warners lot in Hollywood. A newer base followed when the company was an original anchor tenant of the Wilshire Courtyard buildings in Los Angeles's revitalized Miracle Mile district. Aaron Spelling was said to have loved his old office's 1970s shag carpet so much that he had it removed piece by piece and installed in the new office. The company grew so large with so many different entities that at one point it leased all three top floors of the 5700 building and held additional office space across the street. Aaron Spelling had one of the largest offices in Hollywood for a single executive. Upon the company's exit, media companies from all over Los Angeles vied for the desirable office suites; the newly formed The CW briefly looked at the offices when considering a location for the new start-up broadcast network. Spelling Television briefly moved to smaller offices in Santa Monica in 2006.

By 2000, Aaron Spelling remained active and involved as CEO until his death in 2006. Company president Jonathan Levin handled day-to-day operations and longtime Spelling producing partner, E. Duke Vincent helped guide the successful production company. In late 2005, Spelling Television had downsized its staff and signed into a pod development and production deal with Paramount Television, and moved its employees there to Paramount.

=== CBS/ViacomCBS/Paramount Global/Paramount Skydance/Skydance era ===
Spelling Television was eventually downsized even further and became a small "production shingle" under CBS Paramount Television (now CBS Studios), a division of CBS Corporation (later Paramount Global and Paramount Skydance Corporation, now Skydance Corporation), with a small staff. After Aaron Spelling's death on June 23, 2006, the following May 13, 2007 saw Spelling Television shut down and becoming an in-name-only unit of CBS Studios.

== Spelling's library today ==
The CBS/Viacom split essentially resulted in the de-merger of Spelling and Republic. CBS retained the rights to the television side of the Spelling/Republic library, while Viacom (Paramount) retained the theatrical and direct-to-video sides of the library.

Currently, all television programs that were produced or acquired by Spelling Television are distributed by CBS Media Ventures.

The Spelling Television company logo and series were seen on broadcast television for the last time during the rerun of the 7th Heaven series finale on September 16, 2007. The Spelling logo continues to appear on the covers of DVD releases of the Spelling library except for those shows owned outright by Sony Pictures Television, and shows that were not originally produced by Spelling although eventually later acquired, such as Bonanza.

In late 2008, some of Spelling Television's productions, including Beverly Hills, 90210, Melrose Place, Twin Peaks, and The Love Boat began streaming full episodes online through CBS's website under the Classics page.

Since 2015, CBS-owned Pop, formerly called TVGN, airs many of these shows, while Paramount+ streaming service and the CBS portal on Hulu distribute the shows online.

In December 2019, CBS Corporation and Viacom remerged into a single entity under the name ViacomCBS (later Paramount Global and currently known as Skydance Corporation), which reunited Spelling library and Republic library full-circles back.

== Spelling Entertainment Group ==
Before the full acquisition by Viacom in 1999 (where only Spelling Television would be left standing as a separate operating unit), Spelling Entertainment Group's holdings consisted of the following:

- Spelling Television and most of the libraries of ancestor companies (excluding Spelling-Goldberg Productions properties which were sold off to Columbia Pictures Television, modern day Sony Pictures Television, and the earliest telemovies up until 1973, which is owned by Disney–ABC Domestic Television)
  - Big Ticket Entertainment launched in 1994 (now a unit of CBS Studios)
  - Spelling Daytime Television launched as a separate division for daytime production based at NBC.
  - Torand Productions
  - Laurel Entertainment, Inc.
  - Spelling Films
  - Republic Pictures including:
    - much of its own library of films and in-house TV series
    - The inherited holdings of National Telefilm Associates (NTA), which itself includes:
      - It's a Wonderful Life
      - Most of Paramount's own classic short subject library including the pre-October 1950 Famous Studios short subject library
      - Some early pre-1952 United Artists material (including High Noon)
      - Pre-1973 NBC Films shows, such as Get Smart, The High Chaparral and Bonanza
  - Worldvision Enterprises acquired in 1989:
    - The Sunn Classic Pictures television and Titus Productions libraries
    - The Taft International Pictures and Taft Entertainment Television libraries, including the game show Blackout
    - Majority of the QM Productions library.
    - Pre-1973 ABC Films shows, as well as American television rights to NBC's Little House on the Prairie (premiered in 1974)
    - The television rights to most of the Carolco Pictures library
    - TeleUNO, Latin American cable network launched in 1993
  - Virgin Interactive Entertainment (91%, acquired in 1994)

In 1998, Spelling divested several assets to return the company's focus solely to television, with the film division closed, and Republic Video's assets and the Spelling library licensed to Artisan Entertainment for seven years, itself merged into Lionsgate in 2003. In May 1998, TeleUNO was acquired by Sony Pictures. That same month, Virgin Interactive's software development assets were sold to Electronic Arts.

After the late 2005 corporate split between Viacom and CBS Corporation, some of the above have gone to each company. Films mostly went to Viacom's Paramount Pictures unit and television with CBS Corporation's CBS Television Distribution unit until the 2019 re-merger, while the Selznick films went to the various territorial television syndication divisions of The Walt Disney Company/ABC, as ABC itself holds the rights to the Selznick films.

As for DVD rights, these are also split (and later reunited again):

- Paramount Home Entertainment owns worldwide DVD rights to the television library; as a part of the original Paramount Television, Spelling content is released under the CBS Home Entertainment banner (one exception being the United Kingdom rights to Twin Peaks, which, due to prior contracts, are handled by Universal Pictures Home Entertainment through its Universal Playback label). Another exception is Holocaust, a miniseries Spelling acquired in the Taft Entertainment acquisition - CBS has licensed DVD rights to various other companies outside the United States, while Paramount/CBS owns the United States rights.
- In the United States, physical media rights to the Spelling/Republic feature film library were handled by Lionsgate Home Entertainment, successor to previous Spelling/Republic video licensee Artisan Entertainment, in the early 2000s. When Paramount took over full ownership, many were relicensed to home video label Olive Films. Today, almost all of the films are owned by Paramount, with a few of the titles (most notably It's a Wonderful Life) handled directly by Paramount while the rest have been licensed out to labels as Kino Lorber, Vinegar Syndrome, and Criterion. In the rest of the world, DVD rights to the films are owned by various other companies (for example, Universal in the United Kingdom, and Paramount themselves in France and Region 4).

== Past names ==
- Aaron Spelling Productions (1965–1988)
- Spelling Entertainment Inc. (1988–1992)
- Spelling Entertainment Group (1992–1999)

== See also ==
- Aaron Spelling
- Spelling-Goldberg Productions
- Worldvision Enterprises
- Republic Pictures
