= Paramount Domestic Television =

Television distribution arm of Paramount Pictures

- Formerly: Paramount Domestic Television and Video Programming (1982–86)
- Type: Subsidiary
- Industry: Television distribution; Broadcast syndication
- Predecessor: Paramount Television Domestic Syndication
- Founded: 1982; 44 years ago
- Defunct: April 24, 2006; 20 years ago
- Fate: Rebranded as CBS Paramount Domestic Television, then merged with King World to form CBS Television Distribution, which later rebranded as CBS Media Ventures
- Successors: CBS Media Ventures; Paramount Global Content Distribution; Paramount Worldwide Television Licensing & Distribution
- Parent: Gulf and Western Industries (1982–89); Paramount Communications (1989–94); Viacom (1994–2005); CBS Corporation (2005–06)

Paramount Domestic Television (PDT) was the television distribution arm of American television production company Paramount Television, once the television arm of Paramount Pictures. It was formed in 1982 originally as Paramount Domestic Television and Video Programming, the successor to Paramount Television Domestic Distribution, Paramount Television Sales, and Desilu Sales, and was rebranded as CBS Paramount Domestic Television on April 24, 2006.

== History ==
Initially, it distributed the back library of Paramount Television and the post-1960 shows by Desilu, and several first-run syndicated shows. Originally, the company (like other sister companies sharing the Paramount name) was owned by Gulf+Western, which was reincorporated as Paramount Communications in 1989.

In 1987, it entered into an agreement with Tribune Entertainment Company whereby Paramount would distribute Geraldo, with Tribune producing. In 1989, both Tribune and Paramount worked again on The Joan Rivers Show, Paramount distributing the program and Tribune producing the series. Also that year, Paramount Domestic Television made its first foray into late-night television with the debut of The Arsenio Hall Show, hosted by Arsenio Hall himself. In 1990, Tribune and Paramount parted ways, with Tribune handling sales of the show in-house. In 1990, Maury Povich signed with Paramount to develop a daily talk show; his show debuted in 1991 and was distributed by Paramount until 1998, when Studios USA assumed those responsibilities.

After Paramount was sold to Viacom in 1994, it absorbed the distribution functions of Viacom Enterprises the next year. Viacom had distributed the classic CBS library which included the pre-1960 Desilu library, alongside series from Viacom Productions and Carsey-Werner Productions library (Paramount lost the rights to the latter library in late 1994 when Carsey-Werner formed its own in-house distribution unit).

PDT also gained syndication rights to series from MTV Networks with the Viacom merger, though these have rarely been seen in syndication (MTV generally licensed syndication rights of its programs to other companies at various points, such as October Moon, Debmar-Mercury, MGM Television, Trifecta Entertainment & Media and Litton Entertainment, rather than distributing them through PDT). Shortly after The Arsenio Hall Show was cancelled following the acquisition of Viacom, Paramount began distributing and producing MTV's The Jon Stewart Show for the syndication market. In 1987, Coca-Cola Telecommunications teamed up with Paramount Domestic Television (PDT), and Orbis Communications to form International Advertising Sales, which handled advertising of such programs produced by PDT, Orbis and Coca-Cola Telecommunications, including future programming for Merv Griffin Enterprises.

MCA Television and Paramount Domestic Television (PDT) had formed Premier Advertiser Sales, a joint venture created for the sale of advertising for their existing syndicated programs in September 1989. As a possible outgrowth of this sales joint venture, MCA and Paramount began plans for a new network, Premier Program Service.

In 1999, Viacom acquired several other television production firms such as Spelling Entertainment Group (which owned Spelling Television, Worldvision Enterprises, Republic Pictures Television, and Big Ticket Entertainment) and Rysher Entertainment (or at least its library). As a result, the size of Paramount's television library more than tripled, giving PDT a slew of new series to distribute, and included was the distribution rights to Judge Judy and Judge Joe Brown. In 2002, it struck a deal with HDNet to distribute content that was meant to be short for HDTV.

After Viacom split into two companies – one called Viacom and the other CBS Corporation – Paramount's television operations became part of CBS Corporation. As a result, Paramount Domestic Television became CBS Paramount Domestic Television. That was in turn merged with King World Productions in 2007 to become CBS Television Distribution (CTD). However, because National Amusements retained majority control of both CBS and the new Viacom, CBS programs (including those under the original Paramount Television name) are still distributed by Paramount Home Entertainment; starting in 2005, they have been released through CBS DVD/Blu-ray. However, some former Paramount programs, such as Entertainment Tonight, then moved from being produced at the Paramount lot to CBS facilities.

Currently, syndication rights to Paramount's theatrical film library lie with Trifecta Entertainment & Media.

== List of first-run syndicated series from Paramount Domestic Television ==
=== Original ===
==== Off-network shows ====
- America (1985–86) (co-production with Post-Newsweek Television)
- The Party Machine (1991) (co-produced by Peeples Productions and Arsenio Hall Communications)
- The Montel Williams Show (1991–2008, PDT succeeded Viacom as distributor in 1994)
- The Maury Povich Show (1991–2022, distributed by PDT from 1991 to 1998, now known as Maury, now owned by NBCUniversal Syndication Studios)
- Leeza (1993–2000, aired on NBC from 1993 to 1999 under Paramount Domestic Television)
- The Jon Stewart Show (1994–95, a previous version aired on MTV)
- The Howie Mandel Show (1998–99)
- Rendez-View (2001–02)

==== Talk shows ====
- Geraldo (1987–97, distribution only, produced by Tribune Entertainment Company and Investigate News Group)
- The Arsenio Hall Show (1989–94, produced by Arsenio Hall Communications; 2013–14 revival co-produced by Tribune Broadcasting and distributed by successor CBS Television Distribution)
- The Joan Rivers Show (1989–93, distribution only, produced by Tribune Entertainment Company and PMGH Productions
- Dr. Phil (2002–23, produced by PDT from 2002 to 2006 and distributed by King World Productions from 2002 to 2007)

==== Infotainment ====
- Entertainment Tonight (1981–present, distributed by PDT from 1981 to 2006)
- Hard Copy (1989–99)
- The Insider (2004–17) (distributed by PDT from 2004 to 2006)

==== Courtroom shows ====
- Judge Judy (1996–2021, distributed by PDT from 1999 to 2006, co-produced by Big Ticket Entertainment, formerly distributed by Worldvision Enterprises)
- Judge Mills Lane (1998–2001, distributed by PDT from 1999 to 2001, formerly distributed by Rysher Entertainment)
- Judge Joe Brown (1998–2013, distributed by PDT from 1999 to 2006, co-produced by Big Ticket Entertainment, formerly distributed by Worldvision Enterprises)

==== Scripted comedy/drama shows ====
- Madame's Place (1982–83)
- Webster (1983–89, aired on ABC from 1983 to 1987)
- Marblehead Manor (1987–88)
- Star Trek: The Next Generation (1987–94)
- Friday the 13th: The Series (1987–90)
- War of the Worlds (1988–90)
- Star Trek: Deep Space Nine (1993–99)
- Viper (1994 then 1996–99, aired on NBC in 1994)

==== Reality shows ====
- America's Dumbest Criminals (1996–2000, distributed by PDT from 1999 to 2000, formerly distributed by Worldvision Enterprises)
- Sightings (1992–97, aired on Fox from 1992 to 1994, and on Sci-Fi Channel from 1996 to 1997)
- Real TV (1996–2001)
- Maximum Exposure (2000–02)
- Life Moments (2002–03)
- TAG:I: Real Heroes (1999–2002)
- America's Diaries (mini-series) (2002) (distributed by PDT and co-produced by True Entertainment and Bunim/Murray Productions)
- The Princess Girl Diaries (mini-series) (2003) (distributed by PDT and co-produced by Banyan Productions)
- Unexplained Mysteries (2003–04)

==== Game shows ====
- Make Me Laugh (1979–80)
- Anything for Money (1984–85)
- Wipeout (1988–89)
- The New Price Is Right (1994–95)
- Dance 360 (2004–05)

==== Music shows ====
- Solid Gold (1980–88)
