= Negasi Zuberi =

American convicted serial rapist

- Born: 1993 (age 32–33); United States
- Convictions: 2017: Sexual intercourse with a minor; 2024: Kidnapping; Transporting a victim for criminal sexual activity; Illegally possessing a firearm and ammunition as a convicted felon
- Penalty: Life in prison

Details
- Victims: At least 2
- Span of crimes: 2016 – July 2023
- Date apprehended: July 16, 2023

Negasi Zuberi (born 1993) is an American convicted kidnapper and serial rapist, apprehended in July 2023 after kidnapping a woman in Seattle and transporting her to his home 450 miles away in Klamath Falls, Oregon. Authorities believe Zuberi may be linked to additional assaults across multiple states since 2016. He was convicted on October 18, 2024 for kidnapping, transporting a victim for criminal sexual activity, and illegally possessing firearms and ammunition as a convicted felon.

== Criminal career ==
Negasi Zuberi’s criminal activities are believed to have started in 2016, spanning multiple states, including California, Washington, Utah, and Oregon. He has been linked to a series of assaults involving drugging women’s drinks and posing as an undercover officer. Zuberi used a variety of aliases, such as “Sakima”, "Justin Kouassi" and “Justin Hyche.” In 2017, Zuberi was convicted of sexual intercourse with a minor for having sex with a 16-year-old minor when he was 23. In 2018, Zuberi (under the Justin Hyche alias) appeared with Alicia Westfall (the mother of their two children) on Season 23 Episode 2 of Judge Judy, with Judy Sheindlin ruling in his favor regarding a dispute.

His most notorious crime occurred on July 15, 2023, when he allegedly kidnapped a woman, took her 450 miles to his makeshift garage in Klamath Falls, sexually assaulted her during the journey, and held her in a cinder block cell before her escape. The victim then flagged down a passerby driving a car and alerted the police. The next day, Reno Police Department officers and Nevada State Police officers located Zuberi through a GPS device in a Walmart parking lot in Reno, Nevada. There, "after a standoff during which he allegedly cut himself and started to bleed 'profusely,' Zuberi eventually surrendered to law enforcement."

When Zuberi's house was searched, handwritten plans were found detailing how and who to kidnap, and how to bury the bodies. According to prosecutors, the notes were prefaced with the phrase, "You must raise an army." Zuberi would scout for potential victims in parking lots and take “surreptitious photos” of the women and their license plates to track their cars as recently as July 2023. The note detailed the type of women Zuberi targeted: “Leave phone at home. Make sure they don’t have a bunch of ppl [sic] in their life. You don’t want any type of investigation.” Another handwritten note was found in his house that detailed how to bury the bodies, reading "dig a hole straight down 100ft.” On October 18, 2024, Zuberi was convicted of kidnapping, transporting a victim for criminal sexual activity, and illegally possessing a firearm and ammunition as a convicted felon; his defense lawyer said he plans to appeal all convictions.

Authorities later discovered that Zuberi is responsible for sexual assaults in at least four other states across the United States. On October 18, 2024 he was found guilty. In January 6, 2025 Zuberi opted to represent himself on the federal court and asked for a delay on his sentencing.

On January 17, 2025, Zuberi was sentenced to life in federal prison for kidnapping and sexually assaulting two women, and holding one in a cell he constructed in his garage.

=== Alleged escape attempts ===
On January 9, 2025, prosecutors announced that they documented evidence that Zuberi tried to escape jail two different times while awaiting sentencing. In the same announcement, prosecutors presented an account of Zuberi's previous sex offense conviction for having sex with a 16-year-old minor when he was 23 years old; he was convicted in 2017 of sexual intercourse with a minor and placed on three years’ probation. The evidence is to be considered for Zuberi's sentencing.
