= CBS Media Ventures =

Broadcast syndication arm of CBS Entertainment Group

CBS Media Ventures, Inc.
- Logo used since January 11, 2021
- Formerly: CBS Paramount Domestic Television (2006–07); CBS Television Distribution (2007–21)
- Type: Subsidiary
- Industry: Broadcast syndication Advertising sales
- Predecessors: Westinghouse Broadcasting; King World; Eyemark Entertainment; Paramount Domestic Television; Viacom Productions/Enterprises; Worldvision Enterprises; National Telefilm Associates
- Founded: January 17, 2006; 20 years ago in Los Angeles, California, US
- Headquarters: Santa Monica, California, US
- Owner: Skydance
- Parent: CBS Entertainment Group
- Website: Official website

CBS Media Ventures, Inc. (formerly CBS Paramount Domestic Television and CBS Television Distribution) is the television broadcast syndication arm of CBS Entertainment Group, a division of Skydance, founded on January 17, 2006, by CBS Corporation from a merger of CBS Paramount Domestic Television and King World.

On launch, the division was led by King World CEO Roger King, who had his own production company merged into the division, until his death on December 8, 2007. It was formerly the main distribution arm of Paramount Media Networks (now handled by Paramount Global Content Distribution), while currently acting as the flagship distribution arm for CBS, and partnering with corporate sibling Warner Bros. Domestic Television Distribution for The CW. The division also consists of CBS's home entertainment arm, CBS Home Entertainment.

== Background ==
The division has distribution rights to acquired television series, mini-series and films from the following libraries:

- CBS Studios
  - Paramount Television Studios
- The original Paramount Television
  - Desilu Productions
  - Viacom Enterprises and Viacom Productions
- Republic Pictures Television
- Big Ticket Entertainment
- Spelling Television
  - Worldvision Enterprises
  - Laurel Entertainment
- CBS Productions
- King World Productions
- The majority of those by Westinghouse Broadcasting/Group W Productions and its own first-run broadcast syndication and off-network television shows

The remainder of Paramount Global's content library is distributed for U.S. television by Paramount Pictures (with some films licensed to Paramount Media Networks.

As CBS Television Distribution, the division formerly distributed the films from the libraries from Republic Pictures and Carolco Pictures. Until 2021, it was responsible for international television distribution rights to a few episodic serial programs which aired on HBO by Rysher Entertainment through its Paramount Global Content Licensing division; it has since being handled by Paramount Global Distribution Group (both of these are currently known as Paramount Global Content Distribution). It also acted as an advertising sales representative for Debmar-Mercury, which is now owned by Lionsgate.

This is the seventh distribution name for CBS: CBS Television Syndicated Sales (1948-52) was the first, CBS Television Film Sales (1952–58) was the second, CBS Films, Inc. (1958–68) was the third, CBS Enterprises (1968–70) was the fourth, Eyemark Entertainment (1995–99) was the fifth and CBS Paramount Domestic Television (2006–07) was the sixth. The first 4 CBS distribution monikers were also used for a separate media company-turned-conglomerate connected to CBS which evolved to what is now historically known as the first/original incarnation of Viacom Inc..

The current moniker for the overseas distribution arm CBS Media Ventures since 2009 is CBS Studios International, now Paramount Global Content Distribution.

== History ==
=== As CBS Paramount Domestic Television ===
CBS Paramount Domestic Television logo, used from January 17 to September 26, 2006.

On January 17, 2006, CBS Paramount Domestic Television became an interim syndication arm.

=== As CBS Television Distribution ===
CBS Television Distribution logo, used from September 26, 2006, to January 15, 2021

The previous distribution arm of CBS, CBS Paramount Domestic Television, merged with King World Productions to form CBS Television Distribution on September 26, 2006. It was distributed Paramount movies until May 2009. On January 16, 2007, the studio launched a separate home video division, CBS Home Entertainment, for release of in-house-made shows on home video which would be distributed through the second incarnation of Viacom via Paramount Home Entertainment (which continues till date).

On February 25, 2007, CBS Television Distribution sold shows produced by Showtime to its parent subsidiary for self-syndication and broadcast. Later that year on August 18, CBS Television Distribution acquired a 50% stake in online talent search service Big Shot from Madison Road Entertainment and Maverick Television. On November 20, 2007, CBS Television Distribution began carrying first-run episodes of Everybody Hates Chris on its-owned stations and those of Fox in 2009, with CBS signing a deal with Nickelodeon on March 2, 2008, to bring reruns of Everybody Hates Chris to air for cable broadcast on its Nick at Nite channel.

On October 6, 2012, John Nogawski left his role as president of CBS Television Distribution with programming president Aaron Meyerson following in his footsteps a week later. On October 22, 2013, former executive of Telepictures Productions, Hilary Estey McLoughlin, joined CBS Television Distribution as head of creative affairs. On March 2, 2015, CBS Television Distribution renewed Judge Judy through to the end of the 2019–20 television season.

With a growing international syndication business, CBS sought to split the group. On July 9, 2016, CBS hired former executive vice president and general sales manager for 20th Television's syndication arm and MyNetworkTV, Paul Franklin, as head of CBS Television Distribution with Nuñez returning to just being president of CBS Studios International.

On October 30, 2018, Armando Nuñez was named chief content licensing officer for CBS Corporation, replacing Scott Koondel who stepped down for a production deal with the CBS network, and president and chief executive officer for CBS Global Distribution Group, replacing outgoing executive Paul Franklin, which he added to his presidency at CBS Studios International.

On April 3, 2019, Debmar-Mercury signed an advertising sales deal with CBS Television Distribution as a replacement for 20th Century Fox Television (now 20th Television) which was acquired by The Walt Disney Company. CBS Television Distribution Media Sales is now responsible for the advertising sales for the Lionsgate/Revolution Studios television libraries, Family Feud, and The Wendy Williams Show. In June 2019, CBS Television Distribution announced that it would launch Dabl, a lifestyle broadcasting network on September 9, 2019.

=== As CBS Media Ventures ===
On January 11, 2021, CBS Television Distribution was renamed "CBS Media Ventures" as part of an ongoing rebranding of all CBS properties; the new name was announced as reflecting businesses beyond syndication, including ad sales and digital content production.

In November 2024, CBS Media Ventures was sued by Sony Pictures Television, alleging that the company was engaging in preferential treatment of CBS-owned programming that prevented it from meeting its obligations to maximize the value of Wheel of Fortune and Jeopardy! on the syndication market. The company cited the bundling of lower-rated CBS shows with Wheel and Jeopardy! (such as The Drew Barrymore Show and Hot Bench), prioritizing the clearance of its wholly owned shows (such as Entertainment Tonight) on the highest-rated stations in markets at the expense of the game shows, and laying off their dedicated marketing teams during layoffs associated with the CBS/Viacom merger. Sony argued that the cutbacks had "kneecapped its ability to meet its contractual obligations".

Sony Pictures Television announced on February 3, 2025, that the week's episodes would be the last ones it would feed to CBS Media Ventures and that it would begin distributing episodes of those shows directly to affiliates beginning with the week of February 10. CBS sought and received a restraining order blocking Sony from doing so on February 6. However, on April 10, it was reported that the court had ruled in favor of Sony, thus resulting in CBS losing the distribution rights. CBS then confirmed they would submit an appeal immediately; on May 29, the California Courts of Appeal ruled that CBS would remain distributor of the two shows while the trial is in progress. On November 7, 2025, Sony and CBS announced that they had reached a settlement; Sony will assume the international distribution rights to Wheel and Jeopardy! beginning January 1, 2026, marketing and affiliate relations duties beginning in the 2026–27 season, and fully assume the domestic distribution rights after the 2027–28 season. CBS Media Ventures will, in turn, become the exclusive seller of advertising during the programs through the 2029–30 season.

== Current programming ==
=== First-run syndication ===
- Adam's Law (2026–present; produced by Queen Bee Productions and Big Ticket Television)
- The Drew Barrymore Show (2020–present; produced by Big Ticket Television and Flower Films)
- Entertainment Tonight (1981–present; originally produced by Paramount Domestic Television)
- Flip Side (2024–present; produced by Keller/Noll, Courtside Creative and Game Show Enterprises Studios)
- Hot Bench (2014–present; produced by Big Ticket Television and Queen Bee Productions)
- Inside Edition (1989–present; originally produced by King World)
- Jeopardy! (1984–present; produced by Sony Pictures Television)
- The Perfect Line (2025–present; produced by Inkslar Productions, CMYK Games and Game Show Enterprises Studios)
- Wheel of Fortune (1983–present; produced by Sony Pictures Television)
- Women of Wrestling (2022–present)

=== Off-net syndication ===
- 48 Hours (2023–present)
- Fire Country (2025–present)
- Ghosts (2025–present)
- NCIS: Hawaiʻi (2024–present)
- The Neighborhood (2022–present)

=== Network television ===
- One Magnificent Morning (2014–present; distributor of package to The CW affiliates and The CW Plus)

== See also ==
- List of Paramount Skydance television programs

== Folded companies/divisions ==
- CBS Television Syndicated Sales/CBS Television Film Sales/CBS Films/CBS Enterprises (1948–70)
- Viacom Productions/Enterprises (1971–95)
- Paramount Domestic Television (1982–2006)
- Worldvision Enterprises (1973–99)
- Group W Productions (1961–96)
- Eyemark Entertainment (1996–99)
- CBS Paramount Domestic Television (2006–07)
- King World Productions (1964–2007)
