= Big Ticket Entertainment =

American production company

Big Ticket Television, Inc.
- Logo used since 2012
- Type: Subsidiary
- Industry: Television production; Television syndication
- Founded: October 21, 1994; 32 years ago
- Founder: Larry Lyttle
- Products: Television programs
- Owner: Skydance Corporation
- Parent: Spelling Entertainment Group (1994–1999); Paramount Television (1999–2006); CBS Studios (2006–present)

Big Ticket Television, Inc. (also known as Big Ticket Entertainment and Big Ticket Pictures) is an American production company. Big Ticket is a subsidiary of CBS Studios (formerly CBS Paramount Television and CBS Television Studios), a division of Skydance Corporation founded on October 21, 1994. It is best known for producing the syndicated mainstay Judge Judy from 1996 to 2021.

== History ==
The company was launched on October 21, 1994, under the Spelling Entertainment Group, who named former Warner Bros. Television and Spelling Television executive Larry Lyttle to run the division. Lyttle wanted to name the company Blockbuster Television, after its parent company Blockbuster, Inc., but Viacom opposed the idea due to the chain's fate being unclear. Viacom by that time owned Blockbuster Inc. and its 67% stake in Spelling Entertainment Group. Lyttle chose the name "Big Ticket" by driving by a Blockbuster store and noting Blockbuster's "big ticket" logo. Big Ticket was created primarily as an outlet for non-drama TV series from Spelling, which was largely known for hit dramas at that time. All of its programming was distributed by Spelling's syndication arm, Worldvision Enterprises, until Worldvision was folded into Paramount Domestic Television, later CBS Television Distribution, and now CBS Media Ventures.

In 1999, Spelling Entertainment was bought out by Viacom, resulting in Paramount Domestic Television (which Viacom had owned since its 1994 acquisition of Paramount Pictures) becoming Big Ticket's distributor in June 1999. On June 29, 2003, Paramount Television combined Big Ticket Television's production operations with its network and syndication outputs after Lyttle left the employ of Viacom. In 2006, PDT became CBS Paramount Domestic Television and later CBS Media Ventures (formerly CBS Television Distribution) in 2007.

== Productions ==
Big Ticket's most widely viewed productions are the courtroom series Judge Judy (ended in 2021) and Judge Joe Brown (ended in 2013), with the former debuting in 1996 and the latter in 1998. This left Judge Judy as the company's only program in the 2013-14 television season, although most of the production is done by CBS as the company has been largely a figurehead organization since the CBS takeover of Viacom's television unit. In Fall 2014, Big Ticket also began to produce the three-judge court show Hot Bench, which is created and executive-produced by Judge Judy Sheindlin through her own production company, Queen Bee Productions.

Big Ticket also produced the sitcom Moesha, its spin-off The Parkers and the stop-motion animated comedy Gary & Mike for UPN, the dramas Hack created by David Koepp & starring David Morse and Wolf Lake created by John Leekly & starring Lou Diamond Phillips for CBS (only five episodes of the latter aired on CBS before cancellation, but all nine were shown on UPN), and the talk show parody Night Stand with Dick Dietrick for syndication. For the second (and final) season of the court series Swift Justice, Big Ticket became the production company after the series moved from Atlanta to Los Angeles and shared a studio with Judge Judy and Judge Joe Brown.

The company's most recent program is Adam's Law, which premiered on September 14, 2026. As of the 2026–27 television season, Hot Bench, The Drew Barrymore Show, and Adam's Law are the only programs under Big Ticket management remaining in production.
