= Worldvision Enterprises =

American television program distributor

Worldvision Enterprises, Inc.
- Logo used from 1973 to 1999
- Formerly: ABC Syndication (1953–1954); ABC Film Syndication (1954–1958); ABC Films (1958–1973)
- Type: Subsidiary
- Industry: Television syndication Home video
- Founded: July 20, 1953; 73 years ago (as ABC Syndication); March 30, 1973; 53 years ago (as Worldvision Enterprises)
- Defunct: May 21, 1999; 27 years ago
- Fate: Folded into Paramount Domestic Television
- Successors: TV: Paramount Domestic Television (1999–2006); CBS Media Ventures (2006–); Library: Warner Bros. Domestic Television Distribution (Hanna-Barbera, Hanna-Barbera Pty, Ltd./Taft-Hardie Group Pty. Ltd., and pre-1991 Ruby-Spears library only); DreamWorks Classics (Harvey Films only); Worldvision Home Video: Republic Pictures Home Video (1994–2000); Paramount Home Entertainment (2000–); CBS Home Entertainment (2006–present)
- Headquarters: United States
- Area served: Worldwide
- Parent: American Broadcasting-Paramount Theatres (1954–1973); Taft Broadcasting (1979–1987); Great American Broadcasting (1987–1989); Spelling Entertainment Group (1989–1999)
- Divisions: Worldvision Home Video, Inc.
- Website: www.paramount.com

Worldvision Enterprises, Inc., formerly ABC Syndication, ABC Film Syndication and ABC Films was an American television program and home video distributor established on July 20, 1953 as ABC Syndication, the domestic and overseas program distribution arm of the ABC Television Network. It was renamed as Worldvision Enterprises on March 30, 1973, and was folded into Paramount Domestic Television on May 21, 1999. They primarily licensed programs from independent producers, rather than producing their own content.

== History ==
=== ABC Films ===
On July 20, 1953, American Broadcasting Company launched its own syndication subsidiary, ABC Syndication (later renamed ABC Film Syndication), which was to handle programming in broadcast syndication, making it the third company to enter the leagues of broadcast syndication, following NBC and CBS, and George Shupert was hired as vice president, which specialized in syndication and in-house program production.

On March 27, 1954, American Broadcasting-Paramount Theatres, Inc. decided to regroup ABC Syndication as ABC Films Syndication, Inc. (AFS) as an independent subsidiary, with Shupert promoting to president of the unit, and Don Kearney becoming vice president. By January 1956, AFS formed a 50/50 joint venture production company, Rabco Productions, with Hal Roach Jr.

In January 1956, AFS announced an expansion in production and sales staff for the year. Five new properties were acquired by the company and all received pilots, with two set for syndication if not placed nationally. Two were to be produced by John Gibbs and Meridian Pictures, Renfrew of the Mounted and Ripley's Believe It or Not!, while Rabco's Bernard Fox was assigned with Forest Ranger. The two pilots set for production were The Americano, directed by Martin Gosch and filmed in Spain, and The Force produced by Victor Stoloff about the plain clothed Canadian Mounties division. Two shows, Code 3 and The Three Musketeers were already under production for syndication. One of AFS's earliest successes was Sheena, Queen of the Jungle, produced largely in Mexico by Nassour Studios and starring Irish McCalla as the comic-book heroine. Even though only 26 episodes were filmed, the series ran for years in reruns on local stations, in kiddie-show time slots.

In 1958, ABC Film Syndication, Inc. was reincorporated as ABC Films, Inc. following lead that CBS Television Film Sales was changing its name to CBS Films.

In 1959, ABC International created The Worldvision Corporation to syndicate programs for overseas markets. Henry G. Plitt, previously president of Paramount Gulf Theatres, became president of the company in February 1959, replacing Shupert after he left for Metro-Goldwyn-Mayer (MGM). Kevin O’Sullivan later became president of the company.

In 1965, it became an international syndicator for the NBC series Branded, which marked one of a few times ABC distributed a series not actually airing on the network.

=== Worldvision Enterprises ===
In 1971, the FCC barred the participation of networks in the syndication of their own programs, though this rule was eliminated by 1993. Worldvision Enterprises was formed by five former ABC Films executives to purchase the network's syndication assets on March 30, 1973. In 1974, Charles Fries and his Alpine Productions company had struck a distribution contract with the studio.

Worldvision had good relations with the Big Three networks, notably NBC, who produced Little House on the Prairie, and CBS, who produced Spencer's Pilots, which Worldvision distributed for international syndication.

Around the same time, Worldvision decided to return distribution rights to the game show The Dating Game to Chuck Barris Productions, while retaining distribution rights to The Newlywed Game until its completion of its network run.

In 1977, Worldvision Enterprises had entered into an agreement with television producer Mark VII Limited, who had disaffiliated from Universal Studios, and became an independent producer, to distribute its productions, including Project U.F.O. and Sam.

On November 7, 1981, Worldvision launched a home video subsidiary Worldvision Home Video, Inc., which was enabled to distribute videocassette titles of content from the Taft Entertainment Company, most notably its Hanna-Barbera cartoon product, the Jack Nicklaus' Golf My Way instructional video series, as well as the QM Productions library, with Albert Hartigan headed executive vice president and Martin Weinstein as the sales manager of the company.

Worldvision has been owned by many companies over the years. The growth of its home video division was primarily under the ownership of Taft Broadcasting, which acquired the company in 1979. The sale was first announced in November 1978. As a result of Taft's purchase of Worldvision, Taft merged its syndicated arms Taft H-B Program Sales and Taft H-B International into the company. In 1981, Worldvision launched subsidiary Evergreen Programs to generate sales of its own programming already aired by networks and stations. In October 1987, Taft's assets, including Worldvision, were acquired by Great American Communications.

Television producer Aaron Spelling, attempting to find an outlet to distribute his programs, attempted to buy Worldvision from Great American, but chief company shareholder Carl H. Lindner told Spelling that he was not interested in selling the company. Lindner did agree to sell Worldvision to Spelling Productions for 50% of Spelling, Inc., the combined company, in 1988. The merger was finalized on March 1, 1989.

In 1994, Worldvision's home video division was folded into Republic Pictures' Home Video division after Spelling Entertainment's purchase of Republic in the same year. Also that same year, Blockbuster Inc., operator of the now-defunct video store chain, briefly held a controlling interest in Spelling, and its logo appeared on programs alongside Worldvision's.

When Spelling Entertainment Group merged with Viacom on May 21, 1999, Worldvision's operations were folded into Paramount Domestic Television, then given over to CBS Corporation at the end of 2005 when Viacom and CBS were split into different companies.

On December 4, 2019, CBS Corporation and Viacom remerged into a single entity as ViacomCBS (later Paramount Global and currently Skydance Corporation), which currently distributes the Worldvision library through CBS Media Ventures. The Hanna-Barbera library (including the Hanna-Barbera Pty, Ltd./Taft-Hardie Group Pty. Ltd. library and most of the pre-1991 Ruby-Spears Enterprises library) is currently distributed by Warner Bros. Animation. The Harvey cartoons reverted to The Harvey Entertainment Company and are now owned by NBCUniversal Syndication Studios (via DreamWorks Classics).

After Paramount Skydance Corporation has been acquisition with Warner Bros. Discovery to form Skydance Corporation on October 6, 2026, the Hanna-Barbera library reunited with the Taft International Pictures and Worldvision Enterprises libraries.

== List of first-run syndicated series from Worldvision ==
=== Original ===
==== Animation ====
- The Wonderful Stories of Professor Kitzel (1972–1973, produced by Krantz Films)
- The Funtastic World of Hanna-Barbera (1985–1996, distributed by Worldvision from 1985 to 1992, produced by Hanna-Barbera)
- The Jetsons (1985–1988, produced by Hanna-Barbera)
- Centurions (1986–1987, produced by Ruby-Spears)
- Chuck Norris Karate Kommandos (1986, produced by Ruby-Spears)
- The Yogi Bear Show (1988–1989, produced by Hanna-Barbera)
- Wake, Rattle, and Roll (1990–1991, produced by Hanna-Barbera)

==== Comedy shows ====
- It Pays to Be Ignorant (1973–1974, produced by Stefan Hatos-Monty Hall Productions)

==== Courtroom shows ====
- Judge Judy (1996–2021, distributed by Worldvision from 1996 to 1999, co-produced by Big Ticket Television)
- Judge Joe Brown (1998–2013, distributed by Worldvision from 1998 to 1999, co-produced by Big Ticket Television)

==== Game shows ====
- Let's Make a Deal (1971–1977, distributed by Worldvision from 1973 to 1977, produced by Stefan Hatos-Monty Hall Productions, originally distributed by ABC Films)
- Pictionary (1998–1999, co-produced with Kline & Friends and Pictionary Incorporated)

==== Reality shows ====
- America's Dumbest Criminals (1996–2000, distributed by Worldvision from 1996 to 1999)

==== Scripted comedy/drama shows ====
- The Next Step Beyond (1978–1979, produced by Factor-Newland Productions)
- Throb (1986–1988, co-produced by Swany, Inc., Procter & Gamble Productions, and Taft Entertainment Television)
- Starting From Scratch (1988–1989, produced by Taft Entertainment Television, Flying Unicorn Productions, and Molstar Communications)

==== Talk shows ====
- Night Stand with Dick Dietrick (1995–1997, produced by Big Ticket Television and RC Entertainment)

==== Variety shows ====
- The Hilarious House of Frightenstein (1971, distributor only, produced by CHCH-TV)
- Starring the Actors (1986)
