= Demoulas family =

Greek-American family

Demoulas family Δημουλάς
- Greek-American business dynasty
- Current region: Lowell, Massachusetts, and Andover, Massachusetts
- Origin: Kalabaka, Greece
- Founded: 1917 (Opening of DeMoulas Market)
- Founder: Athanasios and Efrosine Demoulas
- Members: Telemachus "Mike" Demoulas; George A. Demoulas; Arthur T. Demoulas; Arthur S. Demoulas
- Connected members: Bobby Farnham (Grandson of Mike)
- Connected families: Kettenbach, Pasquale, Farnham
- Traditions: Greek Orthodox Church
- Estates: DeMoulas Super Markets, Inc.
- Properties: Market Basket chain
- Website: www.shopmarketbasket.com

The Demoulas family is a Greek-American family that controls Demoulas Super Markets, Inc., the company that operates the Market Basket chain of supermarkets. Beginning in 1990, two sides of the Demoulas family fought for control of DeMoulas Super Markets. The dispute ended in 2014, after protests by employees and customers, when the family of George Demoulas sold their shares to Frances Demoulas, Glorianne Demoulas, Arthur T. Demoulas and Caren Demoulas.

== Athanasios and Efrosine Demoulas ==
Athanasios "Arthur" Demoulas (Δημουλάς) was born in 1883. He was orphaned during the Greco-Turkish War of 1897. On March 17, 1906, he arrived at Ellis Island. He settled in the Acre neighborhood of Lowell, Massachusetts. In 1914 he married Efrosene Soulis (born 1892), a girl he knew from his native village of Kalabaka. In 1917 they left their factory jobs and opened DeMoulas Market. By 1921, they had enough money to purchase a home in Dracut, Massachusetts, with a slaughterhouse out back. They hoped their store would become known for its fresh lamb. During the Great Depression, Demoulas would give families who were struggling financially a free piece of bread with ham or allow them to purchase groceries on credit.

The Demoulases had six children; John (1915–2000), George (1919–1971), an unnamed baby girl (1919–1919), Telemachus "Mike" (1920–2003), Ann (1922–2022), and Evangelos (1925–1930). In 1954, Athanasios and Efrosine Demoulas sold the market to Mike and George for $15,000.

Arthur Demoulas died in 1958. Efrosene died in 1964.

== John Demoulas ==
John Demoulas was born on March 22, 1915. During his youth, he worked in his family's market. As an adult he ran a chain of liquor stores, a bar in Lowell (the Golden Nugget), and Marion's Cafe, also in Lowell. John Demoulas died on March 8, 2000. Demoulas had four children (John, Arthur, Pamela, and Kathleen) with his wife Marion and five illegitimate children with his mistress Dorothy Bedard (Melveen, Mike, Dorothy, George, and Patricia). In 1999, one of his illegitimate sons had his name legally changed from George Bedard to George Demoulas.

== George Demoulas ==
George A. Demoulas was born in 1919 in Dracut, Massachusetts. He graduated from the Hellenic American Academy and Dracut High School. He served in the United States Army during World War II and was stationed at Guadalcanal. After the war, Demoulas joined the family business. In 1953, he married Evanthea Koukias. After he and his brother Mike purchased their parents' market, Demoulas served as executive vice president and treasurer of DeMoulas Super Markets, Inc. Demoulas, who was described as affable and gregarious, dealt with outside parties, including vendors. He brought in many friends from the Greek community, including many people from the Acre, to do accounting, banking, and buying for the company. Within 15 years, the two brothers had transformed their parents' "mom and pop"-style store into a modern supermarket chain consisting of 15 stores.

Demoulas, who was a member of the Holy Trinity Greek Orthodox Church, served as its president. He received the title of Archon Depoutatos from Patriarch Athenagoras I of Constantinople, the highest honor that can be bestowed upon a layman by the Ecumenical Patriarchate.

Outside of DeMoulas Super Markets, Demoulas was a trustee of the Lowell Technological Institute, Hellenic College Holy Cross Greek Orthodox School of Theology, and St. John's Hospital in Lowell.

Demoulas died of a heart attack on June 27, 1971, while vacationing with his family in Athens, Greece.

=== Children ===
George and Evanthea Demoulas had four children; Fotene (1954–), Angelo "Evan" (1955–1993), Diana (1956–), and Arthur S. (1958–). Evanthea Demoulas died on February 8, 2008, in Westwood, Massachusetts.

==== Evan Demoulas ====
Angelo "Evan" George Demoulas was born on April 17, 1955. He graduated from Dracut High School and attended Bridgton Academy and Bentley College. At Dracut High, Demoulas was a standout running back on the school's football team.

Demoulas attended meat cutting school and was given a job in DeMoulas' meat department. He was also appointed to the company's board of directors. He eventually left the supermarket business to become a racecar driver. In 1988 he raced for Pacific Racing in British Formula 3.

On June 13, 1993, Demoulas was in Quebec to watch the Canadian Grand Prix. After the race, he and his friend and former Pacific teammate JJ Lehto were driving from the Circuit Île Notre-Dame to downtown Montreal when Demoulas' car was hit by a driver who had run a red light. Lehto survived, but Demoulas died at the scene.

He was survived by his wife, Rafaele Evans Demoulas, who was pregnant with their daughter at the time.

==== Arthur S. Demoulas ====
Arthur Stephen Demoulas was born in 1958. During his youth, he worked for the family business. He attended the University of Maine, where he was a defenseman for the Maine Black Bears hockey team. He later transferred to Babson College, where he graduated in 1984. He continued to work for DeMoulas Super Markets while in college and eventually rose to the position of assistant produce director. He left the company in 1990, as litigation between him and company president Mike Demoulas led a judge to rule that it would be best for Arthur S. to be put on paid leave. Following his family's legal victory over Mike Demoulas, Arthur S. was given a seat on the Board of Directors, but never returned to the chain's daily operations.

Outside of Market Basket, Demoulas is a member of the board of the Boston Police Foundation.

== Telemachus "Mike" Demoulas ==
Telemachus "Mike" Demoulas was born in 1920. During his youth he was the child most involved with his parents' business. In 1938, Demoulas either dropped out or was expelled from high school and went to work for DeMoulas Market full-time. In 1954, he and his brother George purchased the business from their parents. Demoulas ran the day-to-day operations of the business and found locations for new stores. Within 15 years, the two brothers had transformed their parents' "mom and pop"-style store into a modern supermarket chain consisting of 15 stores. After his brother George's death in 1971 he expanded the Demoulas chain. He also began opening stores under different names, including Market Basket. By 1998, there were 57 Demoulas and Market Basket stores. He remained President of DeMoulas Super Markets, Inc. until 1999, when he resigned as result of a court order.

Outside of Market Basket, Demoulas was known for his philanthropy. He gave millions of dollars to many causes, including programs for the blind and college scholarships. He was credited with helping revitalize the Acre by building a new supermarket and providing money for new infrastructure.

Demoulas died on May 24, 2003, at Massachusetts General Hospital in Boston.

=== Children ===
In 1948, Demoulas married Irene Psoinos (1925–2020). Mike and Irene Demoulas had four children; Frances (1950–), Glorianne (1952–), Arthur T. (1955–), and Caren (1959–). Glorianne is the mother of National Hockey League forward Bobby Farnham.

==== Arthur T. Demoulas ====
Arthur Telemachus Demoulas was born in 1955. He spent his youth working in the family business. He lived in Lowell until his adolescence, when his family moved to Andover, Massachusetts. He attended Andover High School (where he played running back on the school's football team) and Bentley College. In 1974, one year after he graduated from high school, he joined DeMoulas Super Markets Board of Directors. He eventually worked his way up to the position of Vice President. In 1989, after the DeMoulas Super Markets Board of Directors rejected his proposal to start a pharmacy division, Demoulas founded Lee Drug. In 1990, he sold the chain of nine stores to Walgreens. In 1999 he resigned as vice president as result of a court order, but remained on the board of directors.

By 2002, Rafaele Evans, the widow of Evan Demoulas, was voting with Arthur T. Demoulas due to her displeasure with her brother-in-law, Arthur S. Demoulas, after he attempted to gain control of the trust that controlled her daughter's shares. This gave Demoulas a majority vote on the board of directors.

In 2008, Demoulas was named president and CEO of DeMoulas Super Markets, Inc. During his tenure as CEO, sales grew from $3 billion a year to $4 billion, the number of employees grew from 14,000 to 25,000. During the same time, competitors Stop & Shop and Shaw's closed many of their stores due to financial troubles. Market Basket also faced new competition from discount-grocer Wegmans Arthur T. was known for his ability to remember his employees names, birthdays, and milestones, attending many of their weddings and funerals, checking in on ill workers, and asking about the spouses and children of his employees. He was seen as a father figure by a number of his employees and compared to It's a Wonderful Life protagonist George Bailey for his willingness to put people over profit. However, Demoulas' opponents criticized him for being "openly defiant" of the board of directors and having a "dictatorial" management style. He was fired by the board of directors in June 2014, but returned to the company in August after months of protests by Market Basket employees and customers led the family of George Demoulas to sell their shares to Arthur T. and his sisters.

Demoulas resides in Lowell. He and his wife Maureen have three daughters; Madeline, Irene, Mary and; one son Telemachus Arthur

== Legal disputes ==
In October 1989, Evan Demoulas was notified that the Commonwealth of Massachusetts was seeking back taxes on $1 million worth of stock he had sold three years earlier. Demoulas was confused by the call, as he had never sold any stock. He investigated and found that his uncle, Mike Demoulas, had purchased much of his and his family's shares in Demoulas Super Markets without their knowledge.

In 1990, the widow and children of George Demoulas sued Mike Demoulas, alleging that they had been defrauded out of their shares in the company. They claimed they had trusted Mike to take care of the family after George's death and that he exploited this trust in order to have them sell all of George's real estate and 84% of his shares in Demoulas Super Markets to members of his own family pennies on the dollar. Mike Demoulas contended that his brother's heirs had willingly sold their shares in the company because they wanted money and their stock in Demoulas did not pay dividends. According to Mike Demoulas, Evanthea, asked him to sell her shares so she could have money to raise her children, Evan sold his shares so he could begin his auto racing career, and Diana and Fotene sold their shares after they saw how much money their brother received. However, once the company began paying dividends in 1988, the family saw how much money they could have made if they had kept their shares and sought to "rewrite history" in order to regain what they had sold. George's children acknowledged that they had signed many of the documents authorizing the sales and transfers, but stated they were not aware of what they were signing because they were too young to understand and trusted their uncle to take care of them. A jury found in favor of George's family.

A few weeks after the decision, George's son Arthur S. Demoulas filed a second suit, this time alleging that Mike Demoulas had diverted assets from the jointly owned family company, Demoulas Super Markets, to ones controlled by him and his children, including Market Basket. After an eighty-four-day bench trial, judge Maria Lopez found in favor of the plaintiffs. Lopez awarded George's family about $206 million for dividends on stock that had been improperly diverted and 50.5% of the company. She also ordered that all of the assets of Market Basket and the other companies controlled by Mike Demoulas and his family be transferred to Demoulas Super Markets and that Mike Demoulas be removed as president of the company.

In early September 1990, six bugs were found at the headquarters of DeMoulas Super Markets. It was alleged that Arthur S. Demoulas had planted the bugs in order to listen to the legal strategy of the other side of the Demoulas family. Michael Kettenbach, the son-in law of Mike Demoulas, sued Arthur S. Demoulas, claiming that Demoulas had "invaded his privacy rights by having listening devices planted at DSM headquarters." In 1994, a jury found in favor of Arthur S. Demoulas. However, a new trial was granted after a woman came forward with new evidence – a recording of her boyfriend admitting to bugging the office for Arthur S. Demoulas. The case was damaged though when the woman admitted to being a crack cocaine addict who received about $500,000 in housing and other expenses from the family of Telemachus Demoulas and the man on the tape testified that he had been lying during the recorded conversation. On August 4, 1997, Arthur S. Demoulas was again cleared of wiretapping charges by a federal jury.

In 1991, George Demoulas' family sued Mike Demoulas, Arthur T. Demoulas, and Demoulas Super Markets, Inc. chief financial officer D. Harold Sullivan, alleging that the three violated the Employee Retirement Income Security Act of 1974 by using their positions as the trustees of the company's employee profit-sharing plan to make fiscally irresponsible real estate loans to friends and business associates. The United States Department of Labor filed a similar complaint six months later. On May 31, 1994, the Department of Labor announced that they had reached a settlement in which the trustees agreed to sell $22 million of the loans by July 11 or purchase them themselves as well as pay the plan $750,000 to make up for the dropped interest rates on the loans (unless the loan recipients paid the money instead). The trustees also agreed not to make any similar investments. The trustees admitted no wrongdoing in the case. Despite the heavy investment in risky real estate loans, the plan never posted a loss. In the civil case, Judge Rya W. Zobel ruled that the trustees' actions were "wrong but not corrupt" and that the settlement with the Department of Labor was "an adequate remedy". Therefore, she denied the request to have them removed.

In 1997, the Massachusetts Supreme Judicial Court upheld a lower court's ruling that Arthur T. Demoulas had presented the Demoulas Super Markets Board of Directors with “misleading, inaccurate, and materially incomplete” information in order to receive a rejection and keep his cousins from receiving any of the profits from Lee Drug, a pharmacy chain he started after the board rejected his proposal to start a pharmacy division of Market Basket.

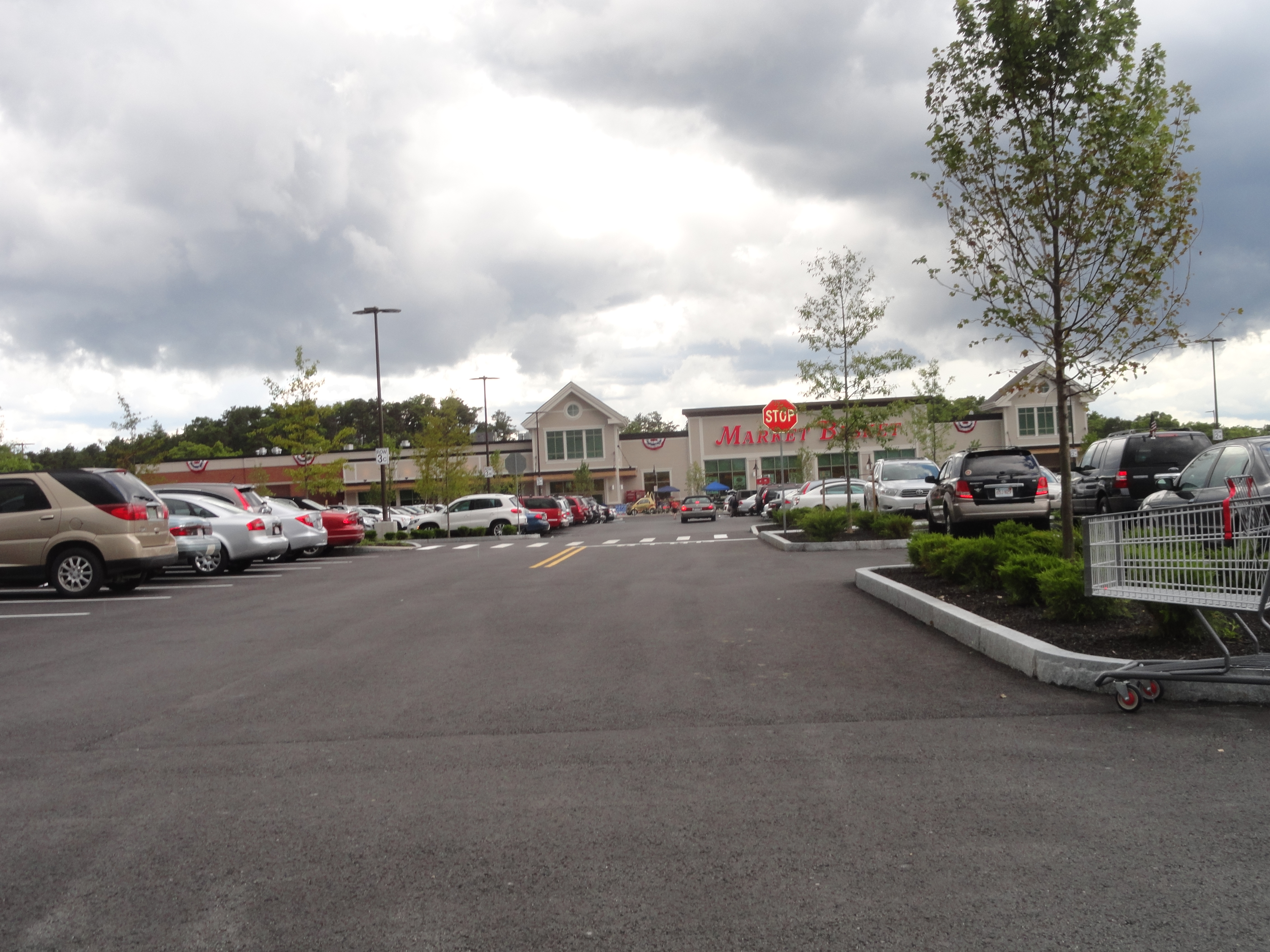
Market Basket store in Bourne

In a 2010 memo to the Board of Directors, Arthur S. Demoulas accused Arthur T. Demoulas of "plundering" millions by paying millions in excessive real estate prices for new Market Basket store locations. One example cited in the memo alleged that Arthur T. had recommended that the company pay $20.9 million to purchase a property in Bourne, Massachusetts, owned by an entity in which he was a major investor. After the sale, Arthur S. had the property appraised by a Boston real estate executive, who valued the property at $9 million. He also accused Arthur T. of paying "grossly excessive fees" to Retail Development and Management Inc., a real estate firmed owned by his brothers-in-law Michael Kettenbach and Joseph Pasquale that oversaw Market Basket's real estate and helped it develop new stores. He and his attorneys argued that the 7.5% of the total development costs "was far in excess" of the prevailing market rate of 2% to 3%. Arthur T. denied his cousin's claim. He argued that Arthur S. trumped up the charges in order to take control of the company and pay himself and the other shareholders more money. Attorneys for Arthur T. noted that Cushman & Wakefield later appraised the Bourne property at $25.5 million. Arthur T. also defended his arrangement with Kettenbach and Pasquale, which he said allowed Market Basket to purchase properties without alerting its competitors, thus avoiding a bidding war and saving the company money. The Board of Directors hired Mel L. Greenberg, a retired judge, to investigate Arthur S.' claims. Greenberg found that there was no wrongdoing by Arthur T. in the purchase of real estate (including the Bourne property) that the fees paid to Retail Development and Management were not excessive. However, he did find that Arthur T. and the Board of Directors had neglected their fiduciary duties by not looking into whether or not the company would have been better off if it had exercised its option to purchase its store in Somersworth, New Hampshire, instead of renting it from a company in which Arthur T. and his family owned a 55% stake.

== 2014 Firing of Arthur T. Demoulas and protests ==
In mid-2013, Rafaele Evans switched loyalties, which tipped the majority vote from Arthur T. to Arthur S.

On June 23, 2014, Arthur T. Demoulas was fired by the board of directors. In response to his firing, six high-level managers resigned, and 300 employees held a rally outside Market Basket's Chelsea, Massachusetts, flagship store on June 24. Beginning on July 18, 300 warehouse workers and 68 drivers refused to make deliveries, which left store shelves severely depleted. On August 27, 2014, after months of protest by Market Basket employees and customers, the shareholders of DeMoulas Super Markets, Inc. reached an agreement to sell the remaining 50.5% shares of the company to Arthur T. Demoulas and his siblings for $1.5 billion. Following the sale, Arthur T. Demoulas owned 28% of the company while his three sisters – Frances Demoulas Kettenbach, Glorianne Demoulas Farnham and Caren Demoulas Pasquale – owned a combined 60%.

== 2025 Firing of Arthur T. Demoulas ==
On May 28, 2025, the board of directors, controlled by Arthur T. Demoulas' sisters, suspended him "for planning a work stoppage in retaliation for requests from the board for basic collaboration and oversight." Demoulas denied the allegations, calling them "a farcical cover for a hostile takeover." Executives loyal to Demoulas were fired and his supporters were removed from the board of directors. On September 10, 2025, Demoulas was fired. On October 1, 2025, Demoulas filed suit in the Delaware Court of Chancery seeking his reinstatement as CEO. On April 20, 2026, judge J. Travis Laster upheld Demoulas' firing. Laster ruled that Demoulas had failed to show that the board of directors had acted bad faith, "that [Demoulas'] longstanding resistance to board oversight, imperious manner, and refusal to compromise with his sisters threatened the company", and that the board of directors had a reasonable suspicion that Demoulas was planning another employee walkout and customer boycott.

== Wealth ==
In July 2014, Forbes estimated the Demoulas family's net worth to be $2.2 billion. They also ranked the family as the 104th richest family in the United States. The following year, Forbes put their value at $3.3 Billion, which made them the 83rd richest family in the U.S. The Demoulas family dropped off the Forbes list in 2016.
