= Johnnie's Foodmaster =

Supermarket chain in Massachusetts, US

- Company type: Private
- Industry: Retail grocery store
- Founded: East Cambridge, Massachusetts 1947
- Defunct: November 18, 2012
- Headquarters: Chelsea, Massachusetts
- Key people: John A. DeJesus, president
- Website: foodmasterinc.com

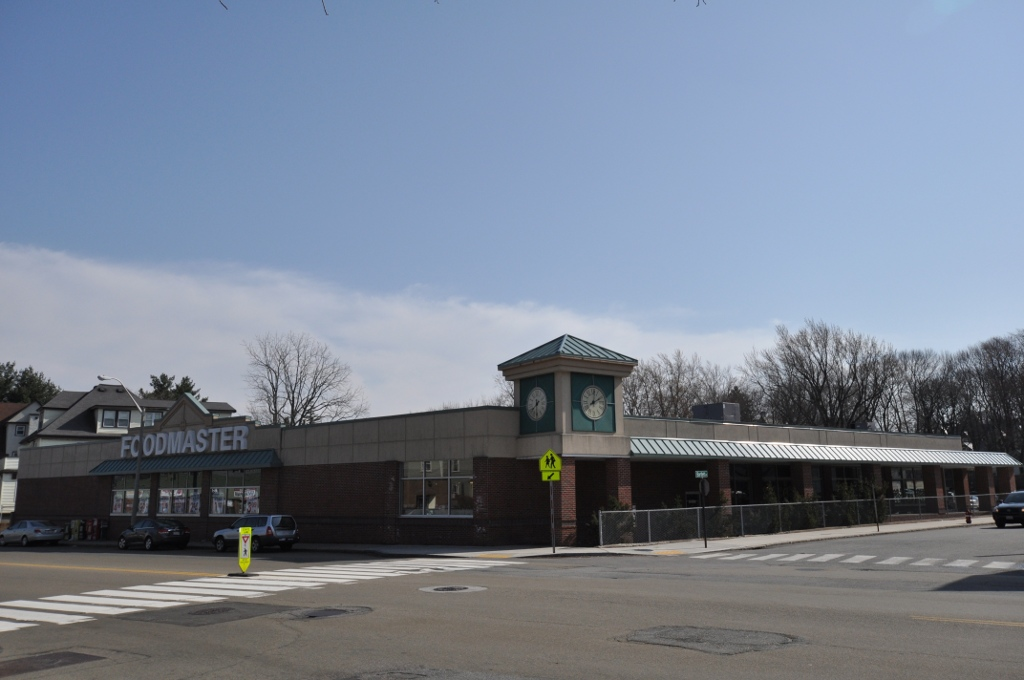
Foodmaster in Arlington, Massachusetts

Johnnie's Foodmaster, more commonly known as simply Foodmaster, was a chain of supermarkets in the Boston Metro Area. It had its headquarters in Chelsea, Massachusetts and all stores were located in the state. On November 18, 2012, all ten stores closed, with six leases being transferred to Austin, Texas–based Whole Foods Market, and two to Quincy–based Stop & Shop; the future of the remaining locations was unknown at the time of closure.

== Operation ==
Foodmaster operated in a grocery marketplace that has a high degree of competition and many competitors, including Shaw's, Stop & Shop, and Market Basket among others. Foodmaster supermarkets were primarily located in shopping centers with other stores. It was unique in terms of its employee dress code. Cashiers and service and grocery clerks were required to wear a black apron, a white collared shirt, and a black bow tie. Also unique was its use of a conveyor belt/rollers for customers’ purchases in early years. Paper bags of groceries were loaded into Postal Service type baskets and sent through a front opening to customers’ cars with the help of employees.

== History ==
John DeJesus Sr. opened his first store in East Cambridge, MA in 1947. At the time of the chain's closure, it was controlled by his son, John DeJesus.

The chain operated eleven stores simultaneously at its peak. A location in Swampscott, MA ran from 2000 until 2004, which was converted to a Whole Foods Market upon its closure. As competition in the region increased, Johnnie's experimented with ways to better cater to its clientele. The Revere location was subsequently converted in 2010 to a Save-A-Lot, a discount supermarket brand under license from SuperValu. Johnnie's management intended to review each of the other store's shoppers to determine if any other locations in the chain would be good candidates for conversion as well. Citing the economy and competition from nearby Stop & Shop, PriceRite, and DeMoulas Market Basket locations, the Revere Save-A-Lot closed on February 12, 2012.

== Closure ==
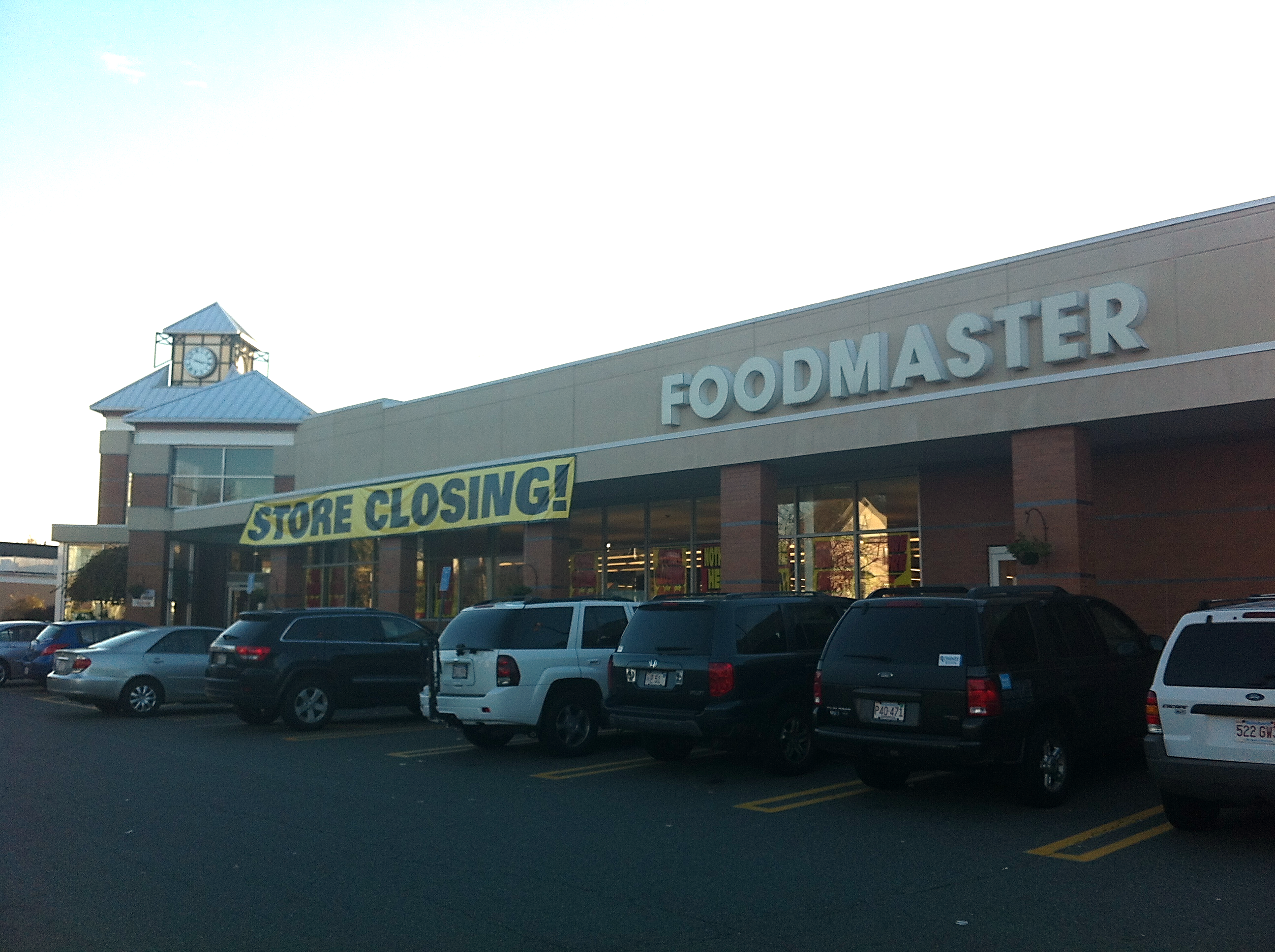
The Melrose store during liquidation.

In late August 2012, it was announced that Austin, Texas–based Whole Foods Market was in the early stages of talks to acquire the leases of six of the 10 Johnnie's locations to expand its presence in the region. The fate of the remaining four locations was not disclosed at the time. On October 26, 2012, Johnnie's announced that it had finalized its agreement to sell the leases for its Arlington, Brookline, Charlestown, Melrose, South Weymouth, and Beacon Street Somerville. A week later, it was announced that the remaining stores in Medford, Lynn, Whitman, and Somerville (Alewife Brook Parkway) would be closing as well, with the Medford store becoming a Stop & Shop. Hilco Merchant Resources, an Illinois-based company, was retained to conduct all liquidation sales. The lease for the Alewife Brook Parkway store in Somerville was acquired by Stop & Shop in February 2013.

== Former locations ==
1. Arlington – 808 Massachusetts Avenue
2. Brookline (Johnnie's Fresh Market) – 1026-1028 Beacon Street
3. Charlestown – Bunker Hill Mall
4. Lynn – 50 Boston Street
5. Medford – 471 Salem Street
6. Melrose – 880 Main Street
7. Revere – 651 Squire Road
8. Somerville (Alewife) – 105 Alewife Brook Parkway
9. Somerville (Beacon Street) – 45 Beacon Street
10. South Weymouth – 35 Pleasant Street
11. Swampscott – 331 Paradise Road
12. Whitman – 688 Bedford Street
13. West Medford - 491 High Street
