= Bobby Farnham =

American ice hockey player (born 1989)

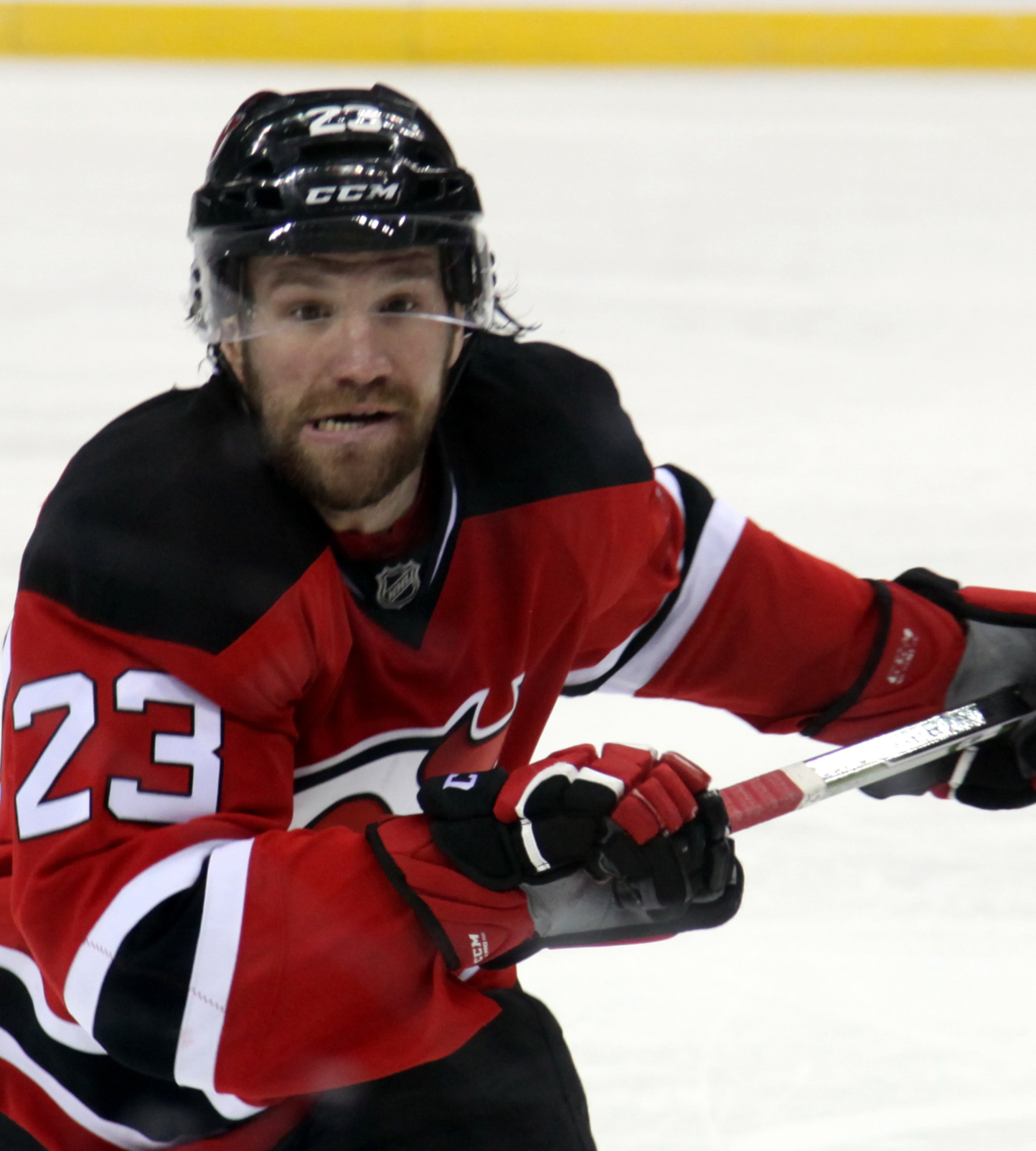
- Born: January 21, 1989 (age 37) North Andover, Massachusetts, U.S.
- Height: 5 ft 10 in (178 cm)
- Weight: 187 lb (85 kg; 13 st 5 lb)
- Position: Left wing
- Shot: Left
- Played for: Pittsburgh Penguins; New Jersey Devils; Montreal Canadiens; Belfast Giants
- NHL draft: Undrafted
- Playing career: 2012–2020

Robert T. Farnham (born January 21, 1989) is an American former professional ice hockey left winger who last played for Belfast Giants in British Elite Ice Hockey League (EIHL). He previously played for the Pittsburgh Penguins, New Jersey Devils and Montreal Canadiens of the National Hockey League.

== Early life ==
Farnham was born on January 21, 1989, to Bob and Glorianne Farnham. His father played for the Brown Bears football team as well as in the Canadian Football League with the Toronto Argonauts. His mother is a member of the Demoulas family, which owns the Market Basket chain of supermarkets. Two of his uncles also played football at Brown and one of his cousins, Buddy Farnham, briefly played for the New England Patriots.

== Playing career ==
=== High school ===
Farnham played his first two high school seasons at Brooks School in his hometown of North Andover, Massachusetts. He helped lead Brooks to back to back ISL Division II Championships. During his sophomore season he was named Hockey Night in Boston Sophomore MVP, Eagle-Tribune Player of the Year, ISL Division II MVP, and was named to The Boston Globe All-Scholastic and All-New England Prep Division II teams. He transferred to Phillips Academy in Andover, Massachusetts for his final two seasons. During the 2007–08 season, he served as the team's co-captain and finished with 21 goals and 30 assists. While at Phillips Academy, Farnham was also the starting third baseman for the baseball team, batting .364 as a junior and .433 as a senior and helping the team to back-to-back NE Prep Championships.

=== Brown University ===
Prior to turning professional, Farnham attended Brown University where he played four seasons (2008–12) of NCAA Division I hockey with the Brown Bears, registering 23 goals, 31 assists, 54 points, and 128 penalty minutes in 129 games. Farnham was named to the ECAC Hockey All-Academic team in 2009, 2010, 2011, and 2012, and he served as the team's alternate captain during his final season. He earned a degree in Commerce, Organizations and Entrepreneurship.

=== Professional ===
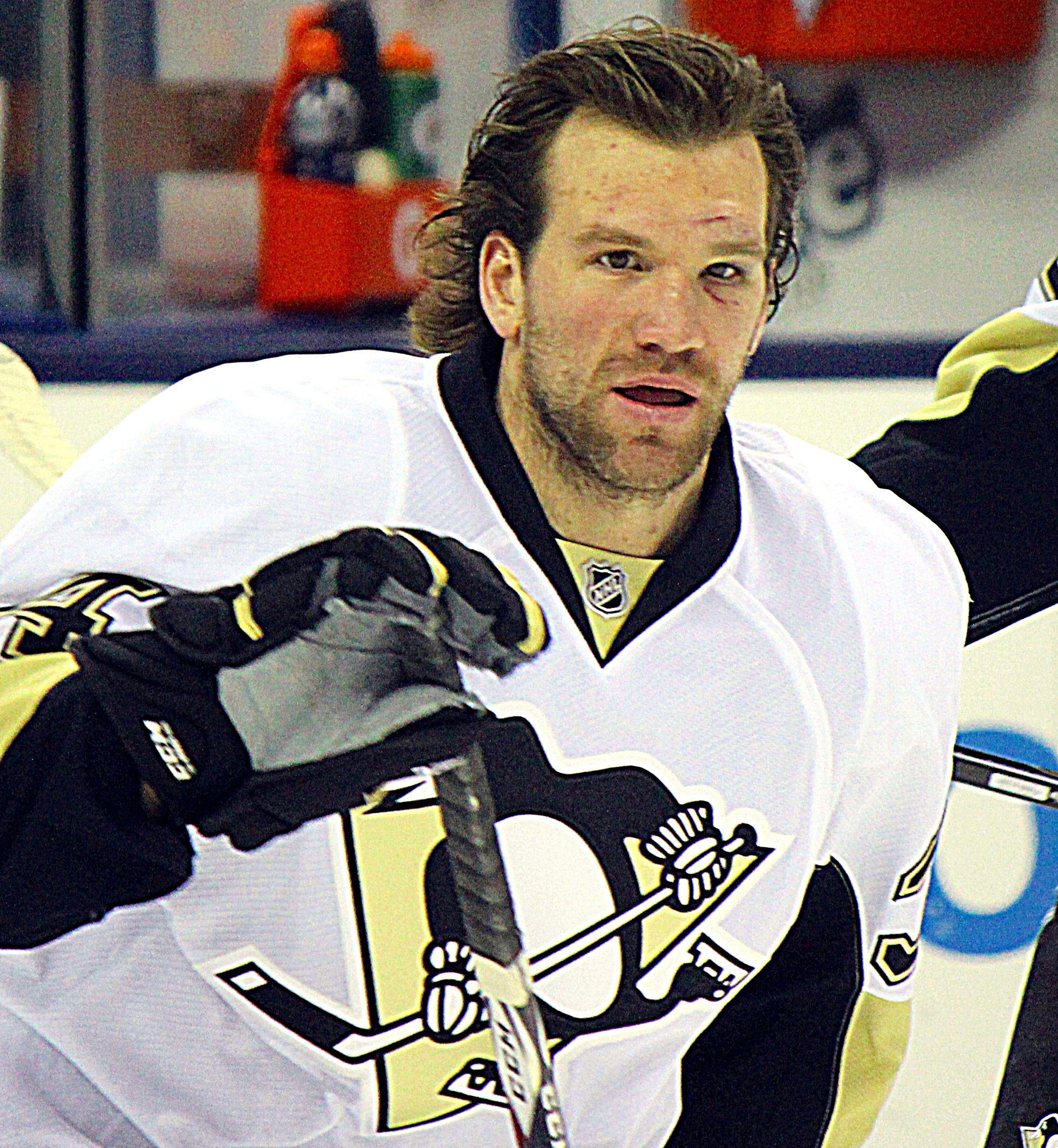
Farnham in December 2014

Because of lack of scoring in college, Farnham's agent advised him that to play professionally he would have to become an enforcer. As of January 2015 Farnham had fought 40 to 50 times, many injuries, and 100 stitches in his face. On March 7, 2012, he signed an amateur tryout agreement with the Providence Bruins of the AHL. On April 12, 2012, Farnham signed an amateur tryout agreement with the Worcester Sharks.

Farnham began the 2012-13 season with the Wheeling Nailers of the ECHL. In nine games he recorded three goals, one assist and 46 penalty minutes. On November 11, 2012, he signed a professional tryout agreement with the AHL's Wilkes-Barre/Scranton Penguins. After eleven games he had two assists and 51 penalty minutes and was signed to an American Hockey League contract. Farnham finished the season with 11 points and led all AHL rookies with 274 penalty minutes in 65 regular-season games.

On July 5, 2013, the Pittsburgh Penguins of the National Hockey League (NHL) signed Farnham to a one-year two-way contract.

Farnham made his NHL debut on December 11, 2014, for the Pittsburgh Penguins in a game against the Columbus Blue Jackets. He appeared in a total of 11 games for Pittsburgh that season. In 64 games with the Wilkes-Barre/Scranton Penguins, he tied his AHL career highs in goals (7), assists (7) and points (14).

On July 13, 2015, the Penguins announced that they had re-signed Farnham to a one-year, two-way contract worth $575,000. He made the Penguins opening night roster to begin the 2015–16 season. Farnham was waived by the Penguins after appearing in 3 games. He was claimed by the New Jersey Devils on October 26, 2015, and recorded a goal and an assist in his Devils debut.

On January 14, 2016, Farnham was suspended for four games by the NHL's Department of Player Safety for an illegal hit on St. Louis Blues' forward Dmitrij Jaskin. Farnham was assessed a major for interference and a game misconduct on the play. The hit was seen as being in retaliation for a legal hit delivered to Farnham seconds earlier by Blues' player Kevin Shattenkirk. As a direct result of the hit, four Blues players chased Farnham while St. Louis forward Ryan Reaves punched Devils forward Jordin Tootoo in a fight.

A free agent in the off-season, on July 22, 2016, Farnham signed a one-year, two-way deal with the Montreal Canadiens. He played in just 3 games with the Canadiens over the course of the 2016–17 season, spending the majority of time with AHL affiliate, the St. John's IceCaps, in scoring 11 goals and 28 points in 71 games.

On August 22, 2017, as an un-signed free agent, Farnham signed a professional try-out to attend the training camp of the New York Rangers. He was subsequently released without a contract from the Rangers leading into the 2017–18 season. On October 24, 2017, Farnham agreed to a professional tryout contract with the Springfield Thunderbirds of the AHL, affiliate to the Florida Panthers.

On 3 August 2019, British EIHL side Belfast Giants confirmed the signing of Farnham.

In 2022 Farnham joined Team Trottier in the 3ICE three-on-three hockey league. He attended Harvard Business School in the fall of that year.

== Career statistics ==
			Regular season					Playoffs
Season	Team	League	GP	G	A	Pts	PIM	GP	G	A	Pts	PIM
2008–09	Brown University	ECAC	31	4	3	7	24	—	—	—	—	—
2009–10	Brown University	ECAC	36	3	8	11	14	—	—	—	—	—
2010–11	Brown University	ECAC	31	8	7	15	39	—	—	—	—	—
2011–12	Brown University	ECAC	31	8	13	21	51	—	—	—	—	—
2011–12	Providence Bruins	AHL	3	0	0	0	4	—	—	—	—	—
2011–12	Worcester Sharks	AHL	3	0	0	0	2	—	—	—	—	—
2012–13	Wheeling Nailers	ECHL	9	3	1	4	46	—	—	—	—	—
2012–13	Wilkes-Barre/Scranton Penguins	AHL	65	3	8	11	274	6	0	0	0	4
2013–14	Wilkes-Barre/Scranton Penguins	AHL	64	7	7	14	166	12	0	0	0	30
2014–15	Wilkes-Barre/Scranton Penguins	AHL	62	7	7	14	226	8	0	0	0	14
2014–15	Pittsburgh Penguins	NHL	11	0	0	0	24	—	—	—	—	—
2015–16	Pittsburgh Penguins	NHL	3	0	0	0	5	—	—	—	—	—
2015–16	New Jersey Devils	NHL	50	8	2	10	92	—	—	—	—	—
2016–17	St. John's IceCaps	AHL	71	11	17	28	137	4	0	0	0	2
2016–17	Montreal Canadiens	NHL	3	0	0	0	17	—	—	—	—	—
2017–18	Springfield Thunderbirds	AHL	69	11	10	21	123	—	—	—	—	—
2018–19	Springfield Thunderbirds	AHL	67	4	13	17	112	—	—	—	—	—
2019–20	Belfast Giants	EIHL	48	15	17	32	79	—	—	—	—	—
NHL totals			67	8	2	10	138	—	—	—	—	—

== Awards and honors ==
Award	Year
College
ECAC All-Academic Team	2009, 2010, 2011, 2012
Ivy League Derek Hines Unsung Hero Award	2012
3ICE
Patrick Cup Champion	2022

Awards and achievements
Preceded by Kyle Schmidt	Derek Hines Unsung Hero Award; 2011–12	Succeeded by Kyle Murphy
