= Market Basket protests =

2014 controversy

- Date: June 24 - August 27, 2014
- Location: New England, (mainly Massachusetts)
- Caused by: Schism within Demoulas family after Telemachus “Mike” Demoulas and his late brother, George’s widow had disagreements over finances.; Removal of Arthur T. Demoulas as CEO.
- Goals: Reinstate Arthur T. Demoulas as CEO.
- Methods: Demonstration; Picketing; Lobbying
- Status: Concluded
- Result: Arthur T Demoulas becomes CEO and runs Market Basket

Parties
Protesters; Market Basket employees; Local customers	Market Basket

Lead figures
Arthur T. Demoulas	Arthur S. Demoulas

On June 23, 2014, the Board of Directors of Demoulas Super Markets, Inc. (led by Arthur S. Demoulas), the company that runs the Market Basket chain of supermarkets, fired President and CEO Arthur T. Demoulas. Demoulas's dismissal resulted in protests from the company's employees and customers. The protests ended on August 27, 2014, when the company's shareholders, including Arthur S. Demoulas, agreed to sell their shares to Arthur T. Demoulas.

== History ==
In 1954, brothers Telemachus "Mike" Demoulas and George A. Demoulas purchased Demoulas Market, their parents' mom and pop-style store in Lowell, Massachusetts, for $15,000 and converted it into a modern supermarket. The brothers eventually expanded their business into a chain of supermarkets, with locations through Massachusetts and New Hampshire in the northeastern United States. George Demoulas died in 1971. In 1990, the widow and children of George Demoulas (including his son, Arthur S. Demoulas) sued Telemachus Demoulas, alleging that they had been defrauded out of their shares in the company. Arthur S. Demoulas later filed a second suit, this time alleging that Telemachus Demoulas had diverted assets from the jointly owned family company to ones controlled by him and his children. Both cases were decided in favor of the plaintiffs. Judge Maria Lopez awarded George's family about $206 million and 50.5% of the company. She also ordered that Telemachus Demoulas be removed as president of the company.

Market Basket logo

=== Presidency of Arthur T. Demoulas ===
In 2008, Telemachus's son Arthur T. Demoulas was named President and CEO of Demoulas Super Markets, Inc. During his tenure as CEO, sales grew from $3 billion a year to over $4 billion, and the number of employees increased from 14,000 to 25,000. During the same time, competitors Stop & Shop and Shaw's closed many of their stores due to financial troubles. Market Basket also faced new competition from Wegmans. Demoulas was known for his ability to remember his employees' names, birthdays, and milestones, attending many of their weddings and funerals, checking in on ill employees, and asking about the spouses and children of his workers. He was seen as a father figure by a number of his employees and compared to It's a Wonderful Life protagonist George Bailey for his willingness to put people over profit. However, Demoulas's opponents criticized him for being "openly defiant" of the board of directors and having a "dictatorial" management style.

=== Allegations against Arthur T. ===
In 2010, Arthur S. Demoulas's lawyers drafted legal memos accusing Arthur T. Demoulas of misappropriating millions of dollars by arranging company deals with companies in which Arthur T. and his family were personally invested. The first allegation was against Retail Development and Management Inc., a real estate firm owned by Arthur T.’s brothers-in-law, Kettenbach and Pasquale. The deal with Market Basket paid Retail Development and Management Inc. 7.5% of the total development costs compared to the traditional industry percentage at the time of 2-3%.

Secondly, Arthur T. recommended Market Basket purchase a property in Bourne, Massachusetts, for $20.9 million. The Bourne property was owned by a company in which Arthur T. was a main investor. After Market Basket purchased this site, Arthur S. consulted Robert Griffin of Cushman & Wakefield, which valued the property at $9 million.

In response to these allegations, the Board of Directors hired Mel L. Greenberg, a retired judge, to investigate Arthur S.' claims.

Greenberg found the fees paid to Retail Development and Management Inc. were not disproportionate to the amount of work done and lawyers for Arthur T. noted that Cushman & Wakefield later appraised the Bourne property as being valued at $25.5 million. Arthur T. also defended his decision to buy the Bourne property, explaining by purchasing that specific property, it allowed Market Basket to avoid fighting in a bidding war against their competitors.

=== Attempted removal of Arthur T. by Arthur S. ===
In mid 2013, shareholder Rafaela Evans, the widow of Arthur S. Demoulas's brother Evan, switched loyalties, tipping the majority vote from Arthur T. to Arthur S. On July 18, 2013, the board did not adopt a motion to dismiss Arthur T. as CEO after protesters gathered outside the meeting. Five days later, the board voted to distribute $250 million to family shareholders, an action opposed by Arthur T. In March 2014, two board members elected by Arthur T., William Shea and Terence Carleton, skipped a meeting in which it was anticipated that there could be a vote to remove Arthur T. as CEO. Arthur S.'s side of the family sued Shea and Carleton, alleging they had intentionally missed the meeting so there wouldn't be enough members to have a vote. A judge sided with Arthur S. and ordered Shea and Carleton to attend the next meeting.

=== Firing of Arthur T. Demoulas ===
On June 23, 2014, three top-level executives - CEO Arthur T. Demoulas, Vice President Joseph Rockwell, and Director of Operations William Marsden - were fired by the board. The Chief Executive position was filled by former Radio Shack executive James Gooch and former Albertsons executive Felicia Thornton, who were appointed to share the position.

=== Protests ===
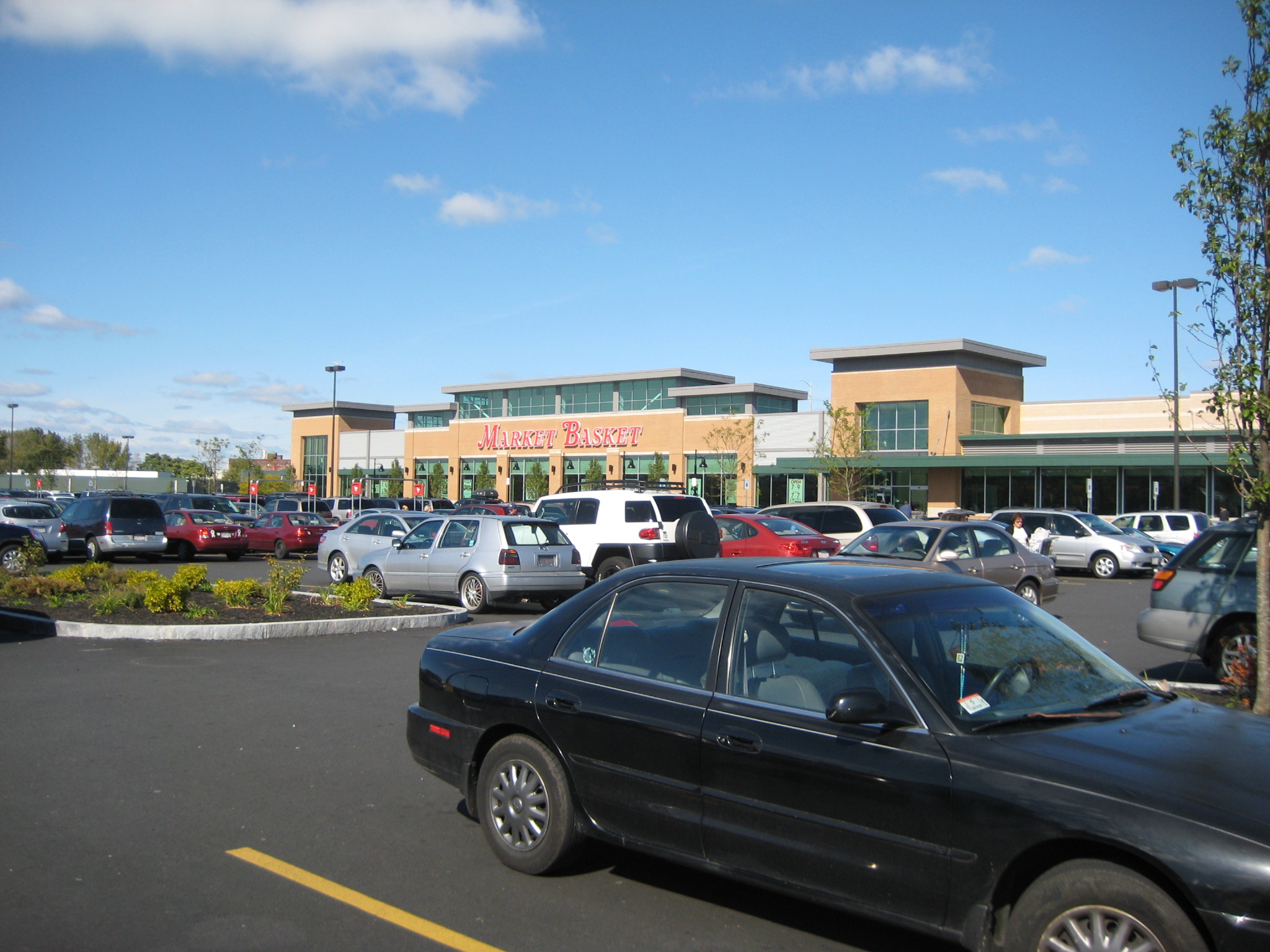
Chelsea Market Basket store

In response to Demoulas's firing, six high-level managers resigned, and 300 employees held a rally outside Market Basket's Chelsea, Massachusetts, flagship store on June 24, 2014. The protesters criticized the Market Basket board for putting money before people by choosing to pay its shareholders more instead of reinvesting in the business. Many employees also feared that the new leadership would cut benefits, wages, profit-sharing, and bonuses and raise prices. Employees also speculated that the removal of Arthur T. Demoulas was the first step in the process of selling the company. Most employees did not go on strike, but rather participated in the protests on their own time, including during breaks.

Shortly after Demoulas's dismissal, the Board of Directors signaled that it was willing to replace the management at Indian Ridge Country Club, a golf club owned by the company. This led to a protest by employees of Indian Ridge Country Club and Market Basket. On June 26, 2014, a member of the company's board of directors who was loyal to Arthur S. Demoulas, accompanied by a police detail, went to the club to fire its management, who were loyal to Arthur T. Demoulas. Later that day, Gooch and Thornton released a statement announcing that they intended to keep the club's management.

On July 16, 2014, employees at Market Basket's headquarters in Tewksbury delivered an ultimatum to Gooch and Thornton. They demanded that the Board of Directors reinstate Arthur T. Demoulas as CEO by 4:30 p.m. the following day. Gooch and Thornton responded the following day by announcing in a letter to employees that the board would meet by phone on July 21, 2014 to address their demands. They also warned that any employee who walked out would be fired. A message on the Save Market Basket Facebook page said that the employees at Market Basket headquarters would not be reporting to work the next day July 18, 2014. On July 18, 2014, protests with between 2,500 and 3,000 employees and customers were held at the company's Tewksbury headquarters and other locations demanding the reinstatement of Arthur T. 300 warehouse workers and 68 drivers refused to make deliveries, which left store shelves severely depleted. Customers chose not to shop at Market Basket due to the lack of product and/or as a form of protest. Stores that usually had over 100 customers in them at one time now had only a few. Most employees did not strike, thus the stores remained fully staffed but employees had little or nothing to do. Many of them joined the protesters outside or performed acts of protest inside the store, such as writing "Boycott Market Basket" on the window, placing signs encouraging customers to not shop there, leaving frozen dairy products out to spoil, or refusing to stock shelves.

On July 20, 2014, eight employees were fired for their roles in organizing the protests. The next day, an estimated 5,000 people rallied outside the Market Basket store in Tewksbury. Leaders of the movement said that the protests must now head to the stores. Employees, as well as state politicians, began to call for a boycott of Market Basket stores. By mid week, Market Basket's sales had fallen about 70%. That night, Arthur T. Demoulas issued his first statement since his firing, calling for the reinstatement of the fired employees. The protests included both management and rank-and-file employees, all of whom are non-union. On July 22, 2014, protests were held at all 71 of Market Basket's stores.

On July 30, 2014, it was reported that managers and assistant managers from 68 of Market Basket's 71 stores prepared to present Gooch and Thornton with a petition stating that they would resign if Arthur T. was not reinstated.

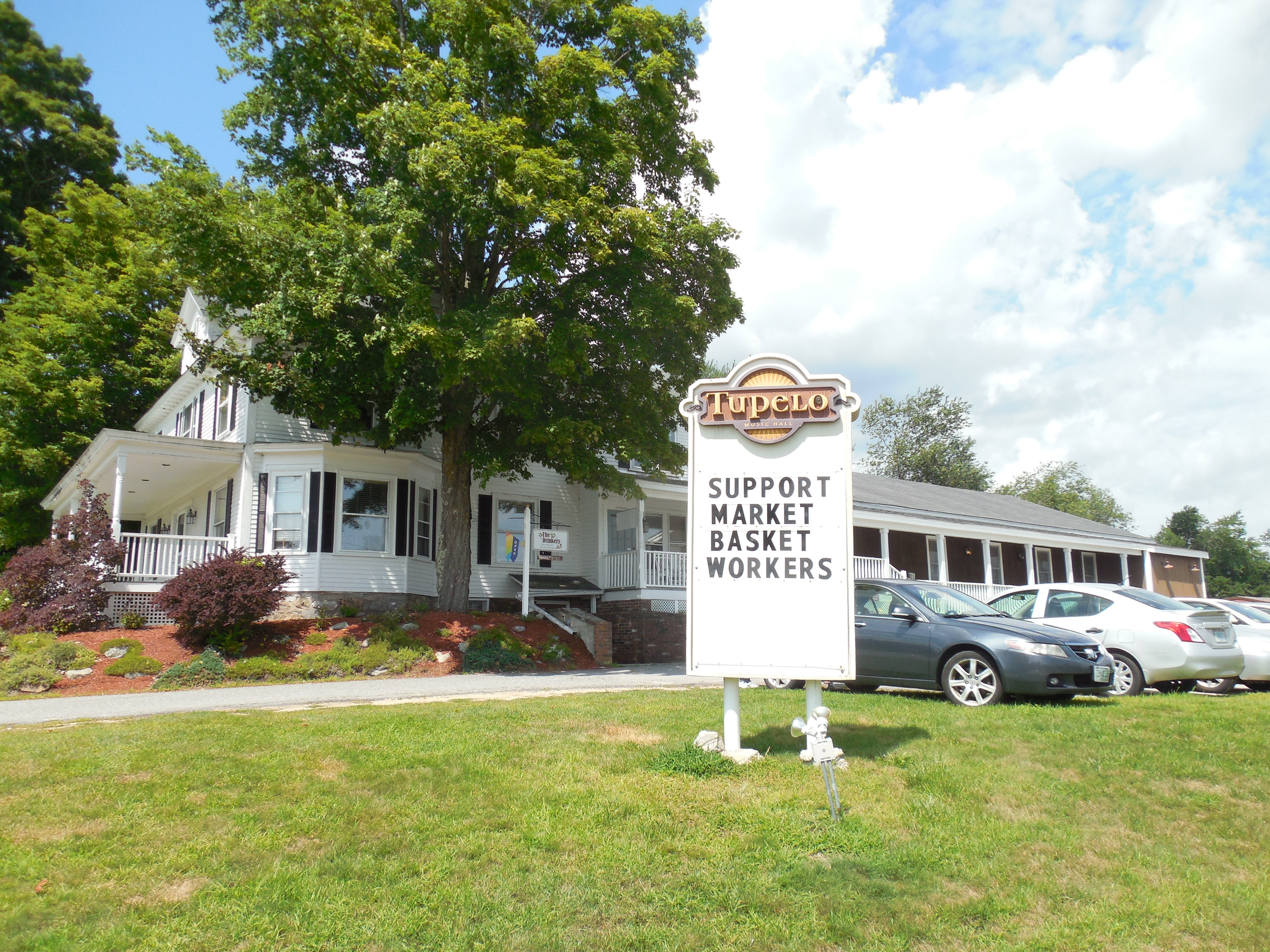
Sign supporting the Market Basket protests at the Tupelo Music Hall in Londonderry, New Hampshire

Supporters of Arthur T. Demoulas kept the rallies going through August. On August 5, 2014, the workers held their fourth-largest demonstration, as thousands protested at the Market Basket store in Tewksbury. Beginning on August 7, 2014, a handful of protesters gathered outside of a home in York, Maine, that reportedly belonged to a Market Basket shareholder. On August 15, hundreds of employees continued to protest, including 200 outside of Market Basket headquarters, despite management threatening to fire a number of employees if they did not return to work. That same day, a replacement driver for Market Basket got out of his truck with a hammer and approached protesters at the company's headquarters in Tewksbury in a threatening manner. He was arrested by Tewksbury police and charged with assault by means of a dangerous weapon and disorderly conduct.

The atmosphere of the Market Basket protests was described as being like an "outdoor rock festival," "tailgating party," and "campaign rally." At a rally at the Tewksbury store, protesters threw beach balls in the air as loud music played from large speakers set up around the parking lot. Also in Tewksbury, a stage adorned with red, white and blue bunting was set up where protesters delivered speeches. At the company's headquarters, protesters put up tents and roasted a lamb in a fire pit. They also brought an American flag to hang from a flag pole on the property after the company went days without putting up a flag. Protesters carried signs with blown-up pictures of Arthur T. Demoulas. Giraffes also appeared on signs and some employees held up stuffed giraffes, as the employees were "sticking their necks out" for Demoulas. Protesters received many donations, including food, signs, and portable toilets.

==== Response from company ====
On July 30, 2014, CEOs Gooch and Thornton released a statement that promised that "any associate that wants to return will be welcomed and not penalized." It also stated that the store would "begin advertising for employment opportunities" on August 8 to replace employees who chose not to work. The letter prompted a response from Massachusetts and New Hampshire Attorneys General Martha Coakley and Joseph Foster, respectively, who reminded the company's executives that their actions had "serious implications" on many small businesses that relied on their relationship with Market Basket for their means of support as well as Market Basket's obligations to compensate fired employees. Thornton and Gooch responded by stating that they "sincerely hoped" they would not have to fire any employees and desired to get the "stores back up and running for our customers and, importantly, for the many local vendors that rely on Market Basket to make their own businesses successful."

On August 4, 2014, the company held a job fair for prospective employees. Thornton and Gooch later stated that they had heard that many people were "concerned for their safety" if they attended the fair and they would allow people to apply for jobs through email because those interested "should be given an opportunity without fear of intimidation or harassment." Steve Paulenka, one of the leaders of the protests, disputed the CEOs' claims. He stated that about 200 employees had demonstrated outside of the job fair and that the protests had been peaceful.

On August 7, 2014, Market Basket stopped scheduling future hours for part-time employees. Beginning August 23, 2014, however, some part-time workers were called back to begin working again if available.

On August 12, 2014, the company sent a "final" warning to 200 to 700 employees. The letter, signed by Gooch and Thornton, informed employees that if they did not return to work by August 15, 2014, the company would consider their jobs abandoned and terminate their employment. According to the Boston Globe, none of the employees that received the ultimatum had returned to work.

On August 16, 2014, Demoulas Super Markets placed security guards at both of the entrances of the company's headquarters. The guards recorded the protesters with camcorders. The company also banned the media from the property.

=== National impact ===
The Market Basket protests struck a chord nationally because, as BBC business reporter Kim Gittleson wrote, "the dispute seemed to encapsulate everything that is wrong with corporate America." Chris Faraone described the dispute as "the last stand for the middle class" in an article for Esquire.

=== Sale negotiations ===
In the midst of the protests, Arthur T. offered to buy the entire company, an offer that the board said it would consider. The board was reportedly also reviewing additional offers.

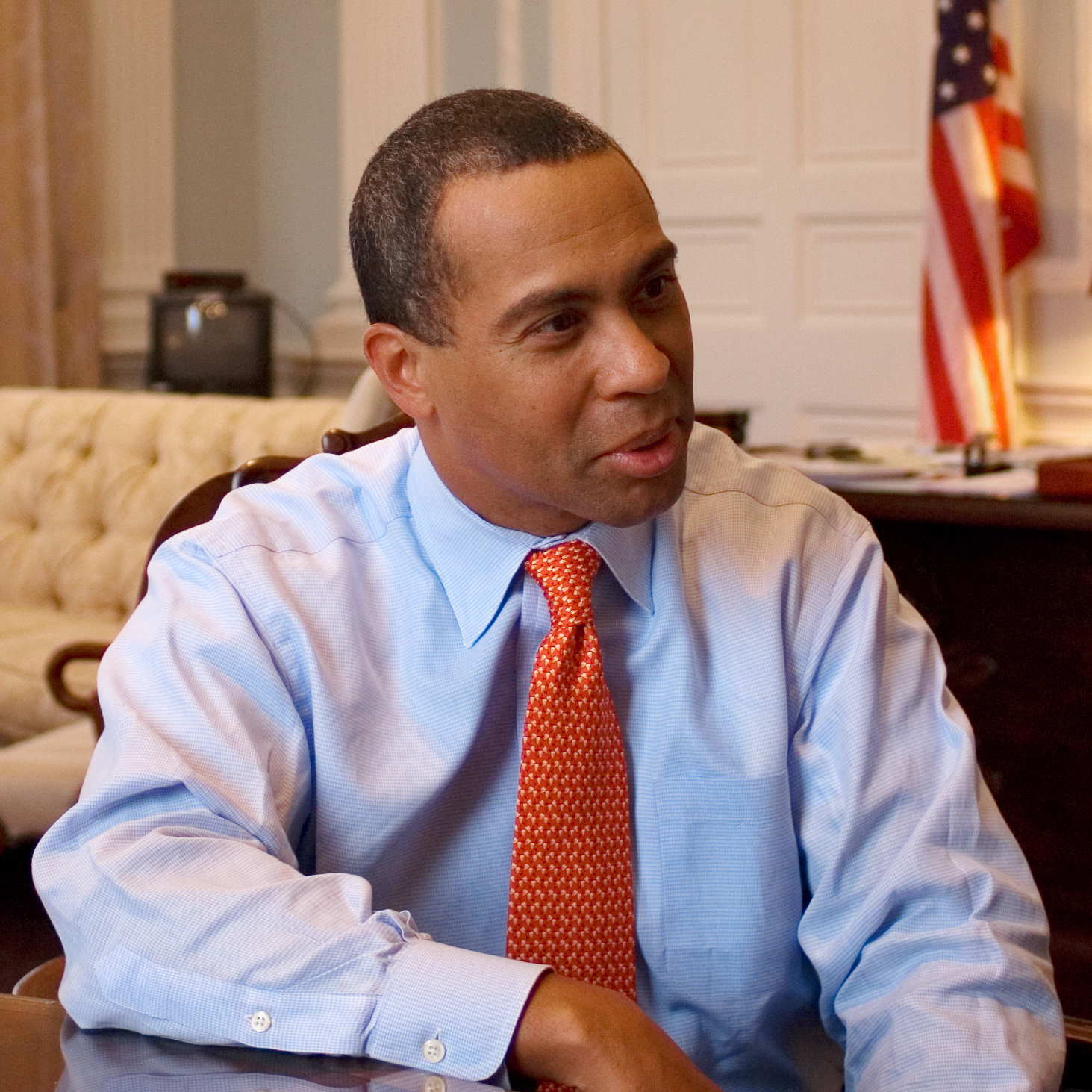
Massachusetts Governor Deval Patrick

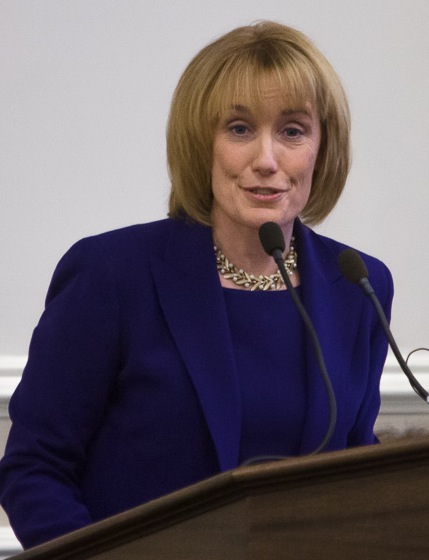
New Hampshire Governor Maggie Hassan

On July 28, 2014, the Boston Globe reported that Arthur T. Demoulas was the only remaining bidder for the 50.5% stake of the company held by the family of Arthur S. Demoulas. All previous offers by outside parties to buy the company had been withdrawn, and the board was reportedly "furiously negotiating" with Arthur T. to resolve the situation. The board denied this report, claiming that several offers were still being considered.

On August 13, 2014, Massachusetts Governor Deval Patrick announced that he had spoken with Arthur T. Demoulas and that it seemed that both sides were close to reaching an agreement that would allow Demoulas to purchase a controlling share of the company. He urged Market Basket employees to "stabilize the company" by returning to work while a deal was finalized. Patrick came under fire for suggesting employees return to work, as his wife is a co-managing partner and labor attorney for Ropes & Gray, the law firm that represented Market Basket's independent board members. Patrick stated that he had not known that his wife's firm had worked for the Board of Directors and that once he became aware he filed a disclosure with the state ethics commission.

On August 17, 2014, Patrick and New Hampshire Governor Maggie Hassan met with both sides of the feud in an attempt to broker a deal. On August 22, 2014, Arthur T. made a $1.5 billion offer for the 50.5% of shares owned by the opposing side of the family; several subsequent days of negotiations initially failed to reach an accord. The company was estimated to be in "dire" financial straits due to the months of protests. According to one estimate, the company lost $10 million a day during the protests.

=== Sale to Arthur T. Demoulas ===
On August 27, 2014, the shareholders of Market Basket reached a deal to sell the remaining 50.5% shares of the company to Arthur T. Demoulas for $1.5 billion. According to Fortune, Demoulas was backed by The Blackstone Group, a private equity firm that put up over $500 million towards the purchase price. However, according to the Boston Globe, a source reported there was no private equity involved. The sale was officially completed on December 12, 2014.
