= St. George Antiochian Orthodox Church (Lowell, Massachusetts) =

Historic church in Massachusetts, United States

- U.S. National Register of Historic Places
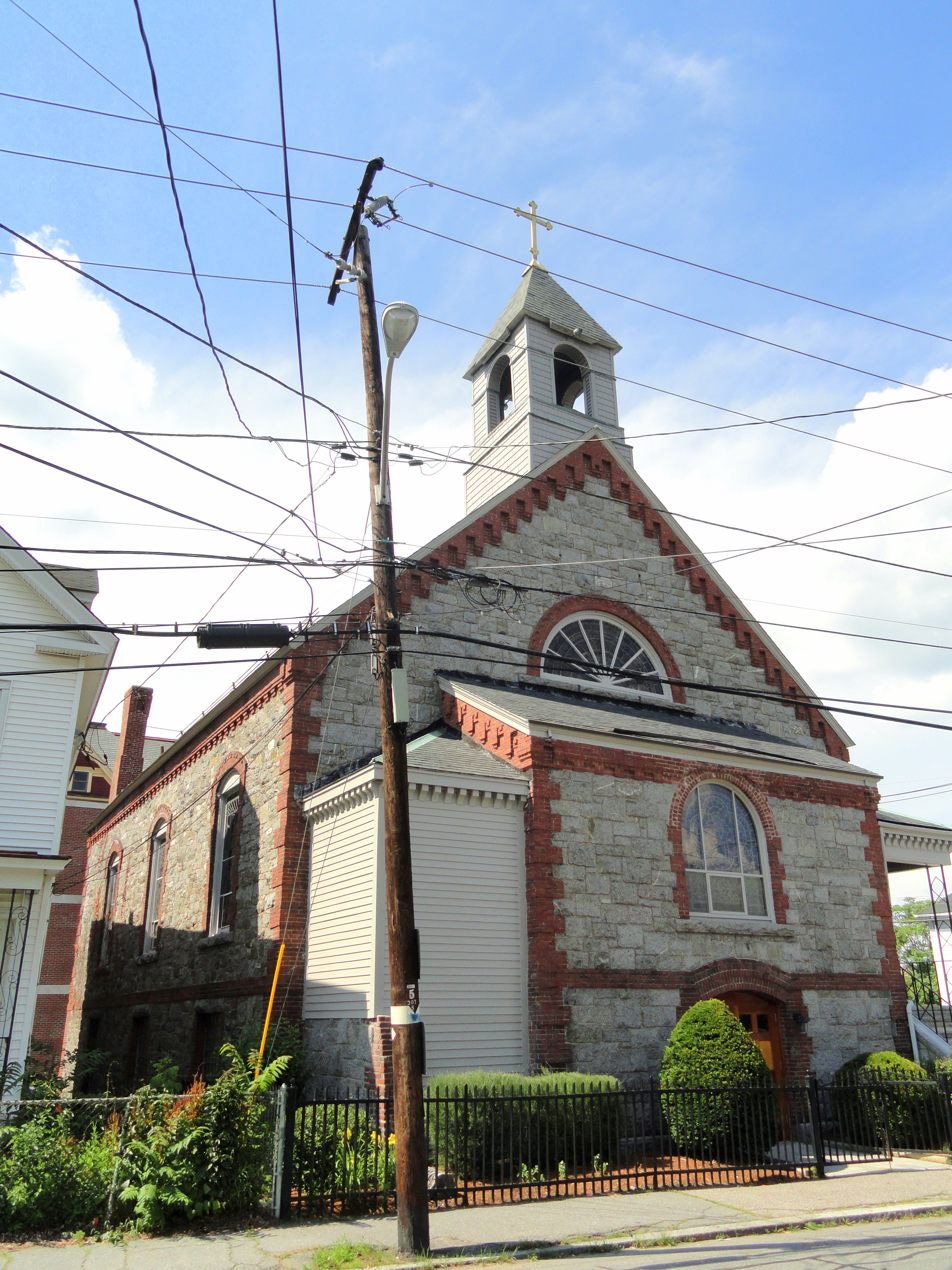

- Location within Massachusetts Location within the United States
- Location: 61 Bowers Street; Lowell, Massachusetts
- Coordinates: 42°38′52.7166″N 71°19′27.6528″W
- NRHP reference No.: 08000507
- Added to NRHP: June 10, 2008

St. George Antiochian Orthodox Church in Lowell, Massachusetts, is an Eastern Orthodox parish under the jurisdiction of the Antiochian Orthodox Christian Archdiocese of North America. St. George Church is one of several Eastern Orthodox churches in the city of Lowell, along with Holy Trinity, Transfiguration, and St. George (all of the Greek Orthodox Archdiocese of America).

== History ==
The first Syrian-Lebanese families came to Lowell in the mid-1880s. They came from two small towns: Aita al-Foukhar in the present-day Lebanon and Saydnaya, Syria. With them came the ancient faith of their forefathers, Eastern Orthodoxy. Since there was no church, and when a priest was available, Sunday services were held in the homes of the faithful. Through the efforts of dedicated laymen, the present church was purchased in 1917. It had originally been built in 1883 by French Huguenots, a Protestant sect. It took two years to remodel and prepare the church building for use as an Orthodox temple of worship. On Sunday, May 25, 1919, Metropolitan Germanos Shehadeh of Zahle, assisted by Archmandrite Seraphim Nassar, dedicated the church edifice. The original parish comprised 25 to 30 families. The parish has grown throughout the years as more Orthodox faithful have migrated and immigrated to the area. The city of Lowell is unique in that approximately one-fifth of the population is of the Eastern Orthodox faith. The parishioners of St. George take pride in their parish's professional people who include doctors, lawyers, graduate engineers and many successful business people. The church has been under the jurisdiction of the following Prelates: Metropolitan Archbishop Germanos Shehadah, Metropolitan Archbishop Victor Abouassaly, Metropolitan Archbishop Samuel David, Metropolitan Archbishop Michael Shaheen, and since August 24, 1975, is under the jurisdiction of Metropolitan Archbishop Philip Saliba Primate and his Auxiliaries, Bishop Antoun Khouri, Bishop Basil Essey, Bishop Demetri Khoury and Bishop Joseph Al-Zehlaoui. Throughout the years, the church has been served by the following Priests:

- 1917-1919: Michael Husson
- 1919-1926: Fiani
- 1926-1929: Raphael Husson
- 1929-1931: Nicholas Husson
- 1931-1938: (closed)
- 1938-1951: Cosmo Ansara
- 1951-1962: Michael Shahin
- 1962-1965: Elias Gillette
- 1965-1966: Haddad
- 1966-1972: Thomas Green
- 1972-1975: Mark Pemberton
- 1975-1976: John Scollard
- 1976-1978: Antony Beauchamp
- 1978-1982: Andrew Zbeeb
- 1982-1986: Daniel Griffith
- 1986-1989: Theodore Pulcini
- 1989-1992: John Teebagy
- 1992-1994: George Sayaf
- 1994-2001: Isaac Crow
- 2001-pres: Leonard Faris

Over the years, much remodeling and beautification of the church has taken place. In the mid-1980s, new icons were installed, painted by the well-known Iconographer, Youssis. The most prominent of these are the breathtaking image of the Holy Virgin (Platytera) in the church apse and the majestic icon of the Pantocrator (Jesus) directly overhead. Most recently, air conditioning has been installed.

== Placement on the National Register of Historic Places ==
St. George of Lowell was listed on the National Register of Historic Places in June 2008. It was included on the National Register because of the church's association with immigrants who worked in the mills that made Lowell the center of the American Industrial Revolution.

== See also ==
- National Register of Historic Places listings in Lowell, Massachusetts
