= Judge Maria Lopez =

American reality court show (2006–2008)

- Genre: Arbitration-based reality court show
- Starring: Maria Lopez (judge); Peter Rodriguez (bailiff)
- Country of origin: United States
- No. of seasons: 2

Production
- Production locations: Metropolis Studios; New York, New York
- Running time: 30 minutes
- Production company: Sony Pictures Television

Original release
- Network: Syndication
- Release: September 11, 2006 – May 23, 2008

Judge Maria Lopez is an American arbitration-based reality court show, presided over by Maria Lopez. On the show, guests themselves presented and argued small claims civil actions before the judge. The half-hour series, produced and distributed by Sony Pictures Television, debuted in the United States and Canada on September 11, 2006. It was Sony Pictures' second court show. The show was taped at the Metropolis Studios in New York City. Prior to joining the series, Lopez was a judge in the Massachusetts Superior Court.

== International viewing ==
Judge Maria Lopez debuted in the same week as another syndicated courtroom show featuring a Latina judge, Cristina's Court. In January 2007, SPT renewed the series for a second season despite being the lowest rated court show of the 2006–07 season, averaging a 0.9 rating. However, in February 2008 reports indicated that due to two seasons of low ratings, Sony Pictures Television was cancelling the series and the show ended on May 23, 2008, along with Judge Hatchett.

== See also ==
- Judge Hatchett
