= Holy Trinity Greek Orthodox Church (Lowell, Massachusetts) =

Historic church in Massachusetts, United States

- U.S. National Register of Historic Places
- U.S. Historic district – Contributing property
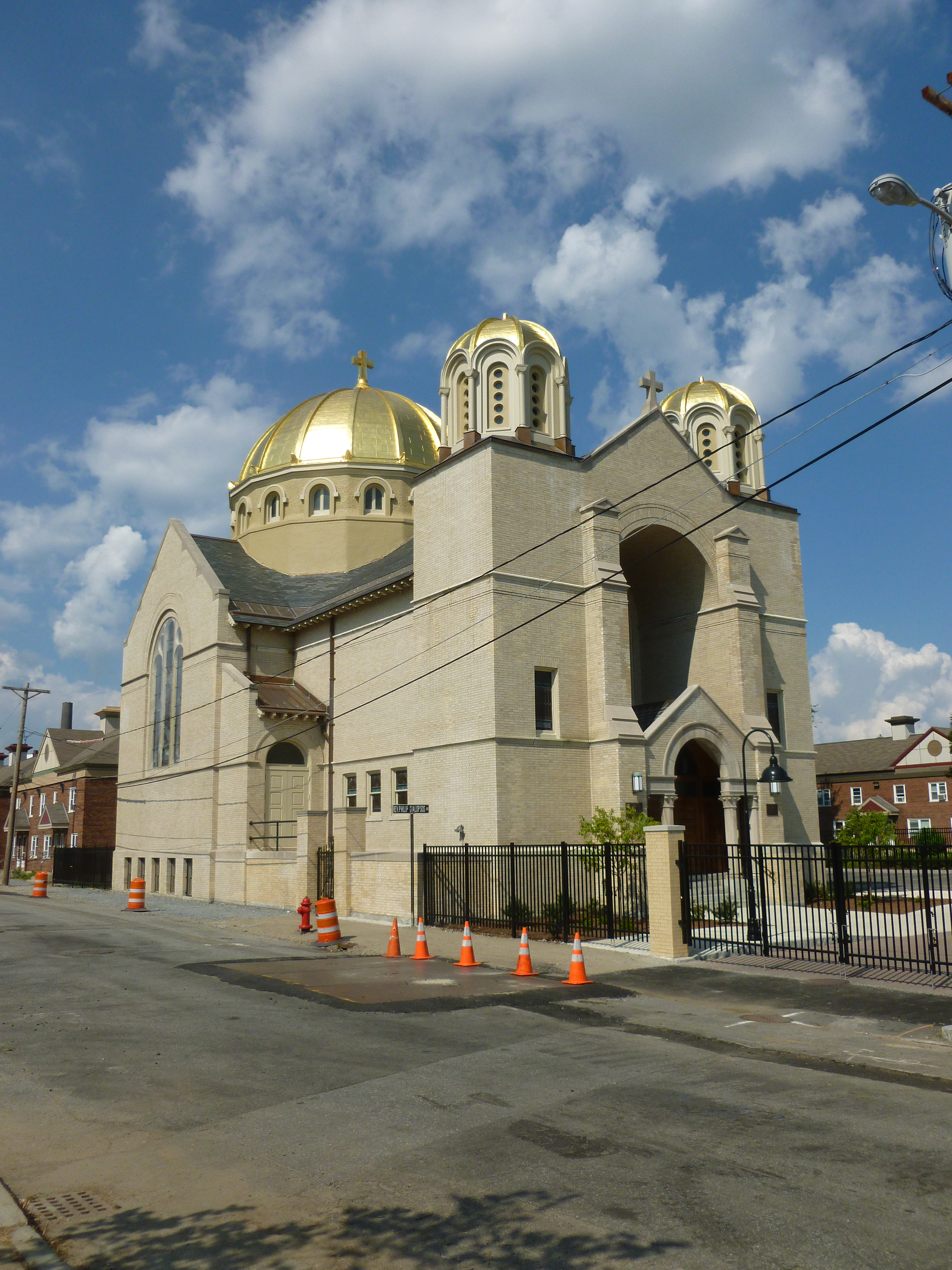

- Location within Massachusetts Location within the United States
- Location: Lewis St, Lowell, Massachusetts
- Coordinates: 42°38′44″N 71°19′2″W
- Area: 0.2 acres (0.081 ha)
- Built: 1906
- Architect: Henry L. Rourke, G. Rinkelin
- Architectural style: Neo-Byzantine
- Website: holytrinitylowell.net
- Part of: Lowell National Historical Park (ID78003149)
- NRHP reference No.: 77000181

Significant dates
- Added to NRHP: April 13, 1977
- Designated CP: June 5, 1978

Holy Trinity Greek Orthodox Church is a historic Greek Orthodox Church building at 62 Lewis Street in Lowell, Massachusetts. Holy Trinity is one of the many Eastern Orthodox churches in Lowell, along with St. George Antiochian Orthodox Church, Transfiguration of Our Savior Greek Orthodox Church, and St. George Greek Orthodox Church. The church is under the jurisdiction of the Greek Orthodox Archdiocese of America and is locally administered by the Metropolis of Boston. The church is located the Downtown Lowell neighborhood known as The Acre. It was built in 1906 and added to the National Register of Historic Places in 1977. Holy Trinity was the first church built for a Greek Orthodox congregation in the United States. It is known for its golden dome, mosaics, iconography, and rich history.

Archbishop Iakovos of America, who led the Greek Orthodox Archdiocese of America from 1959 through 1996, was ordained as a priest at Holy Trinity on June 16, 1940.

== History ==
The church was built because of the growing population of Greek immigrants in Lowell at the time. Construction started in 1906, and the church opened in 1908. It is the first church in America that was built specifically for a Greek congregation. It was accepted for inclusion in the National Register of Historic Places on April 13, 1977. In late 2010, the congregation started restoration work on the church. The exterior was refurbished, and the water damage in the interior is being repaired. In addition, many of the icon murals were restored.

=== Hellenic American Academy ===
The Hellenic American Academy was formed on March 4, 1906. It was first called the Greek Parochial School. The academy was first located in the basement of the church. It was the first Greek Orthodox Academy in America, and was established by some of the same Greek Immigrants who founded the church. The Academy is now located on Broadway adjacent to the church and educates children in grades K-8.

== Architecture ==
Holy Trinity Greek Orthodox Church was built in 1906 as the first Byzantine-style church in America. The building was finished in 1908. The building takes the shape of a cross, like most traditional Greek Orthodox Churches. The structure is Lowell architect Henry L. Rourke's interpretation of the Hagia Sophia in Constantinople. Inside the church, mosaics decorate the narthex. In the nave, various Byzantine icon murals decorate the walls, along with stained glass.

== Gallery ==
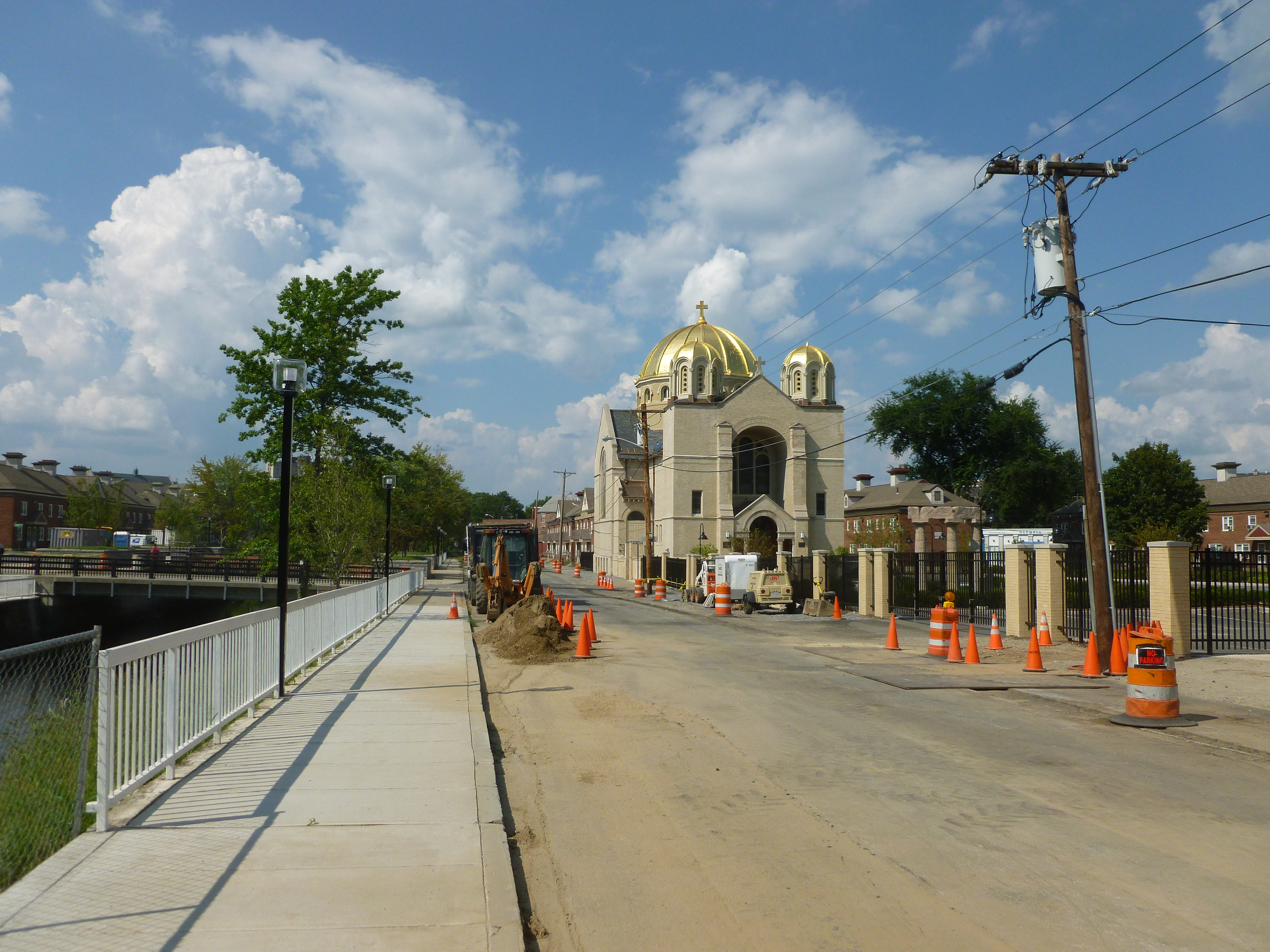
The church during the day.

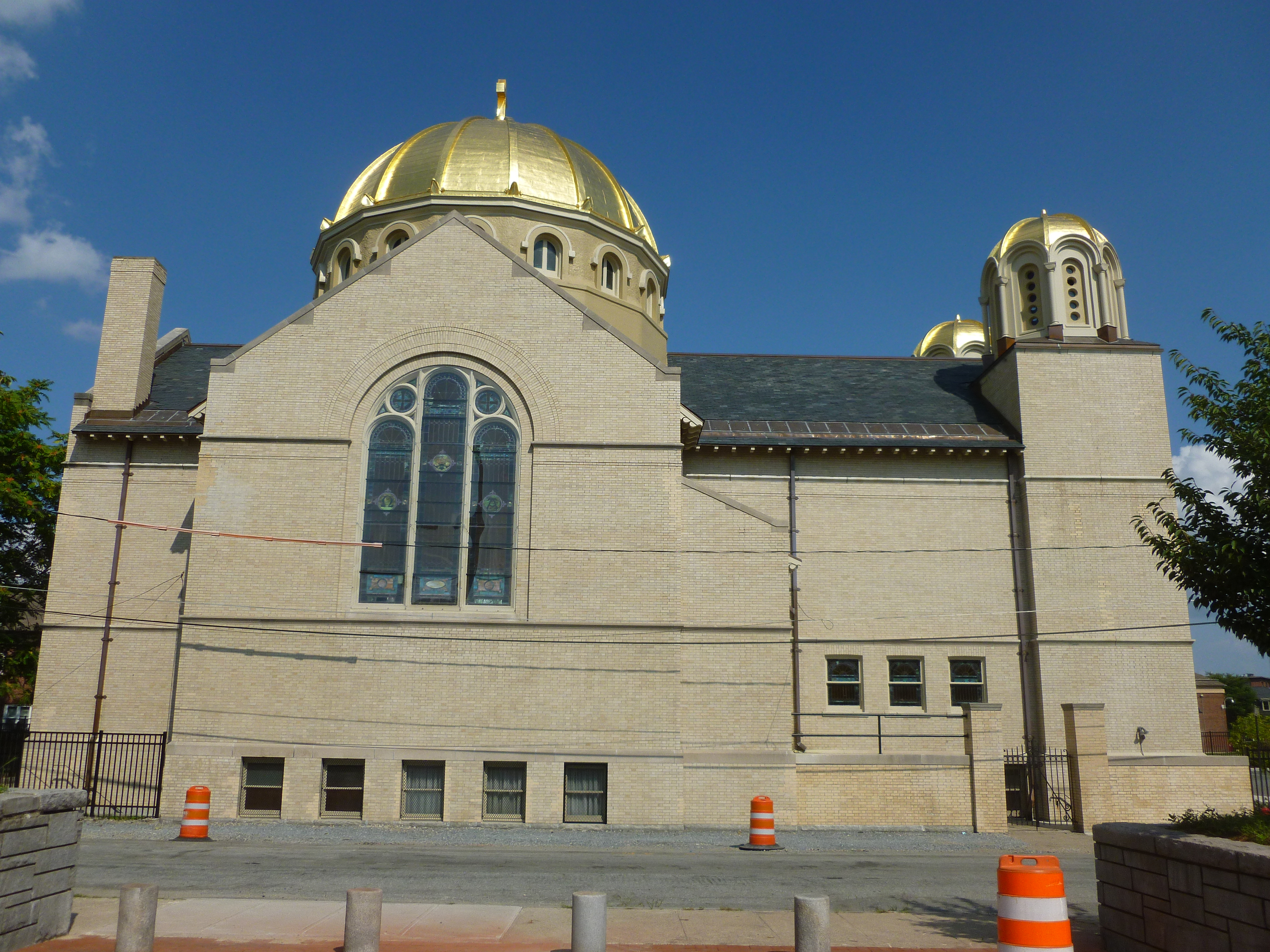
The west side of the church.

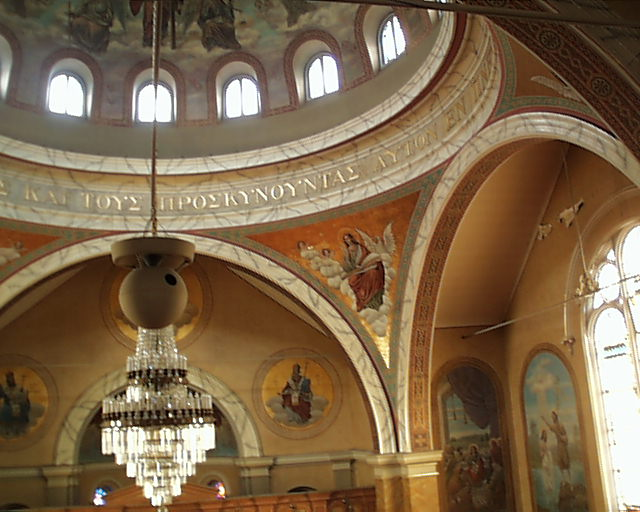
The interior dome.

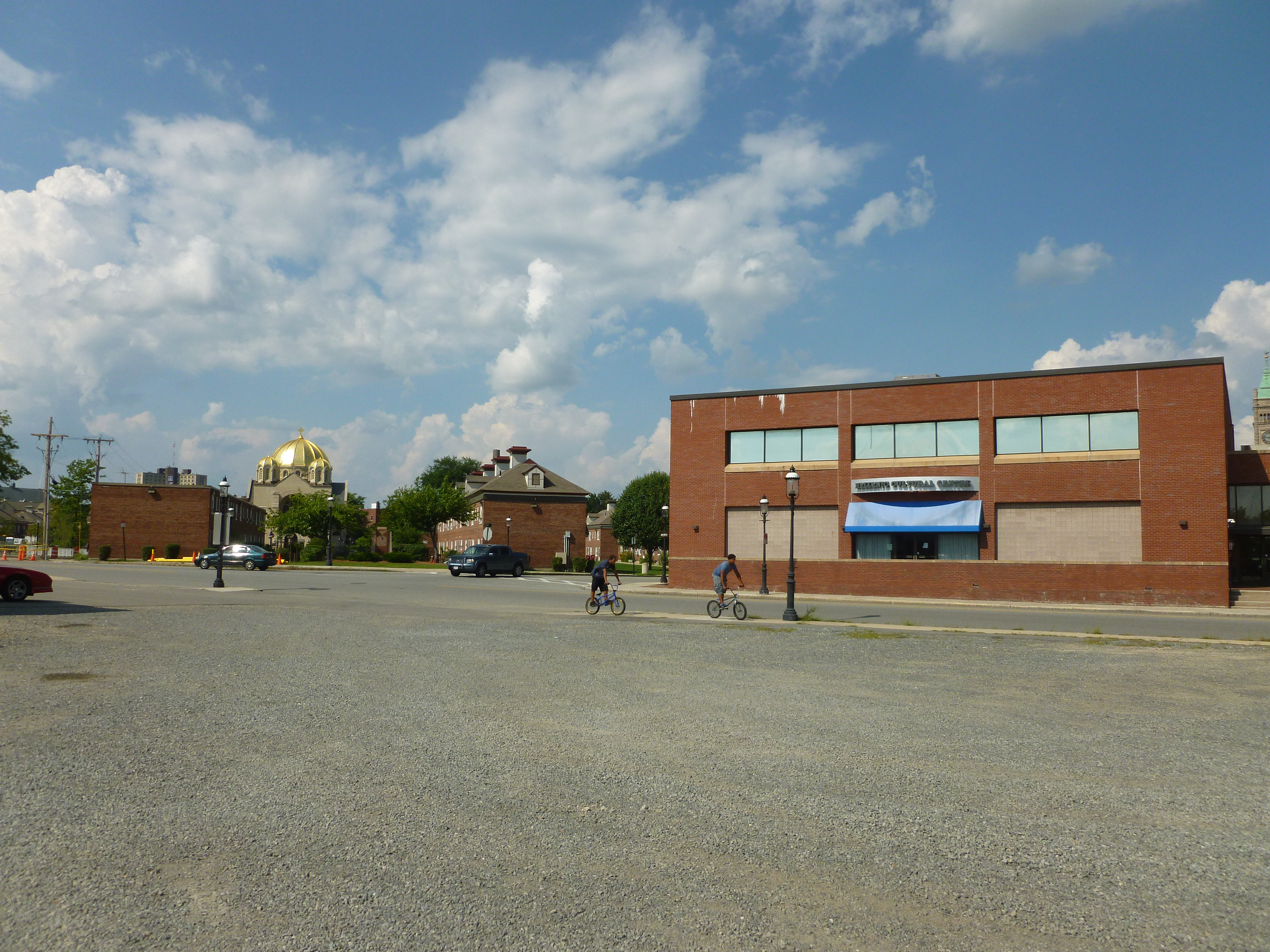
The Hellenic Cultural Center adjacent to the church.
