= Maria Lopez =

US judge and television personality

Maria Lopez (born September 12, 1953) is a Cuban-American former judge and a former television jurist on the syndicated court show, Judge Maria Lopez.

Judge Lopez made legal history as the first Latina appointed to the bench in Massachusetts when she was selected as a District Court Judge by Governor Michael Dukakis. Judge Lopez continued to make her mark in history as the first Latina to be appointed to the Massachusetts Superior Court in 1993. Lopez served as a Superior Court judge and as an assistant attorney general in civil rights division of the office of the Massachusetts Attorney General.

She was married to the late Stephen Mindich, owner of the Boston Phoenix newspaper; she lives in Newton, Massachusetts. She has two sons, Michael Michaud (born in 1983) and David Michaud (born in 1985), who both attended the University of Michigan; they are her sons from her first marriage to Richard Michaud.

Lopez holds a Bachelor of Arts degree in Government from Smith College and a Juris Doctor from Boston University.

== Demoulas Versus Demoulas Case ==
In the 1990s, then Judge Lopez presided over the civil trial for control of shares in the DeMoulas supermarket chain. The trial and subsequent appeals process made this one of the largest and longest civil lawsuits in Massachusetts history. In addition to its length and cost, the trial was notable for attempts by lawyers of Telemachus "Mike" Demoulas to have Judge Lopez removed from the case due to allegations of bias after the jury found that he had defrauded his late brother George's family of shares in the family owned business. After numerous appeals however, Judge Lopez's rulings were upheld.

Allegations of misconduct were raised by Lopez's former law clerk, Paul M. Walsh against attorneys for Telemachus Demoulas. He alleged that he was lured to Nova Scotia under the pretext of a job interview, only to be queried for information the lawyers could then use to prove bias on the part of Judge Lopez.

In October 2006, the state Board of Bar Overseers issued a recommendation to disbar lawyers Gary C. Crossen and Kevin P. Curry, and issue a three-year suspension to lawyer Richard K. Donahue based on their conduct in the Walsh incident. In December 2006, Donahue accepted the three-year suspension from practicing law. In January 2008, the Massachusetts Supreme Judicial Court unanimously agreed with the recommendation of the board and ordered Crossen and Curry disbarred. Both lawyers will have to wait eight years before they can apply for readmission to the bar.

== Charles "Ebony" Horton Case ==
Charles "Ebony" Horton was tried for and pleaded guilty to kidnapping, assault with intent to rape a child under 16, indecent assault and battery on a child under 14, assault and battery, and assault and battery by means of a dangerous weapon. Horton, while dressed as a woman, used a ruse to lead an 11-year-old boy to an abandoned warehouse where he forced the boy to simulate sex acts after holding a screwdriver to the child's neck. During the sentencing phase of the trial, Suffolk County District Attorney David Deakin who had asked Lopez to give Horton an eight-to-ten-year jail sentence, tried to protest her decision to sentence Horton to house arrest and five years of probation. Judge Lopez, who was angered by the presence of members of the media, proceeded to upbraid the prosecutor as she suspected he had alerted the press. During her outburst, she angered members of the victim's family by referring to the case as a "low-level" offense. Judge Lopez's decision also angered residents of the Mary Ellen McCormack housing development in South Boston where Horton would serve his house arrest. Horton was later evicted from the housing development based on the conviction.

The sentencing caused politicians in the state including then Governor Paul Cellucci to suggest that mandatory minimum sentencing should be enacted by statute to remove judicial discretion in cases such as Horton's.

Three years later the Massachusetts Commission on Judicial Conduct found that Lopez had abused her office and lied under oath and that she ought to apologize and serve a six-month suspension.

Retired Judge E. George Daher who headed the commission's investigation, suggested Judge Lopez should not be punished for her in-court behavior, but for her "feeble attempt at coverup". This was the same Judge Daher who had presided over the eviction hearings for Horton when he served as Boston Housing Court Chief in 2000. Rather than apologizing and accepting a suspension, Judge Lopez resigned on May 19, 2003.

I sincerely apologize for my loss of temper in court. Accepting the recommendation of the hearing officer that I be suspended for six months and publicly endorse his findings would no doubt be the easiest and most expeditious way to maintain my judicial position. However, I cannot dishonor my 14 years on the bench, my principles, or the Massachusetts Judiciary by admitting to that which I did not do, Lopez wrote.

Fighting would require that we continue on a road that would subject her family and herself to this constant kind of morass that has been going on. She has simply decided that it is not worth it. Her effectiveness on the bench would be compromised after these proceedings. She has become a lightning rod for both the media and public opinion. It was her decision to step down, Lopez's own attorney, Richard Egbert, stated.

On April 14, 2020, 42-year-old Level 3 sex offender, Charles "Ebony" Horton was again arrested, for kidnapping and assault charges after the suspect allegedly threatened young boys at gunpoint. A 12-year old victim stated the suspect had friended him on Facebook and began messaging him. The victim stated that the suspect knew where he lived and would send someone to hurt him.

Eventually, the suspect demanded that the boy meet him at a restaurant in the area of Seaver Street and Humboldt Avenue. The boy complied out of fear, police said. When the boy got to the location, the suspect guided him to the rear of a building near 100 Seaver St. and then entered a building, police said. “The victim stated the suspect removed a firearm from a green shopping bag before forcing the victim to access his Facebook account. When a police cruiser passed by the area, the suspect ran off.

As detectives started to investigate, they discovered other similar cases. On Jan. 2, a juvenile boy told officers that a suspect kidnapped him and threatened him with a firearm near 500 Columbia Road. And on Oct. 28, another juvenile boy told police that a suspect kidnapped him and threatened him with a firearm near 150 Columbia Road, according to the news release.

== Television show ==
On September 11, 2006, Judge Maria Lopez debuted, a half-hour show where real life disputants come to settle a case. An episode may include two smaller cases or one big case, such as "The Dirty Videographer Was A Lemon".

After one year on the air, the Judge Maria Lopez ranked last among nine syndicated judge shows, only gathering a Nielsen household rating of 1.0. Among all 160 syndicated shows ranked, the Judge Maria Lopez show placed 118th in viewership. Despite its low ratings, Sony Pictures renewed the series for a second season. However, in February 2008 reports indicated that after two seasons of low ratings the show would be canceled.

== See also ==
- List of Hispanic and Latino American jurists
- List of first women lawyers and judges in Massachusetts
