= Market Basket (New England) =

New England supermarket chain

Demoulas Super Markets, Inc.

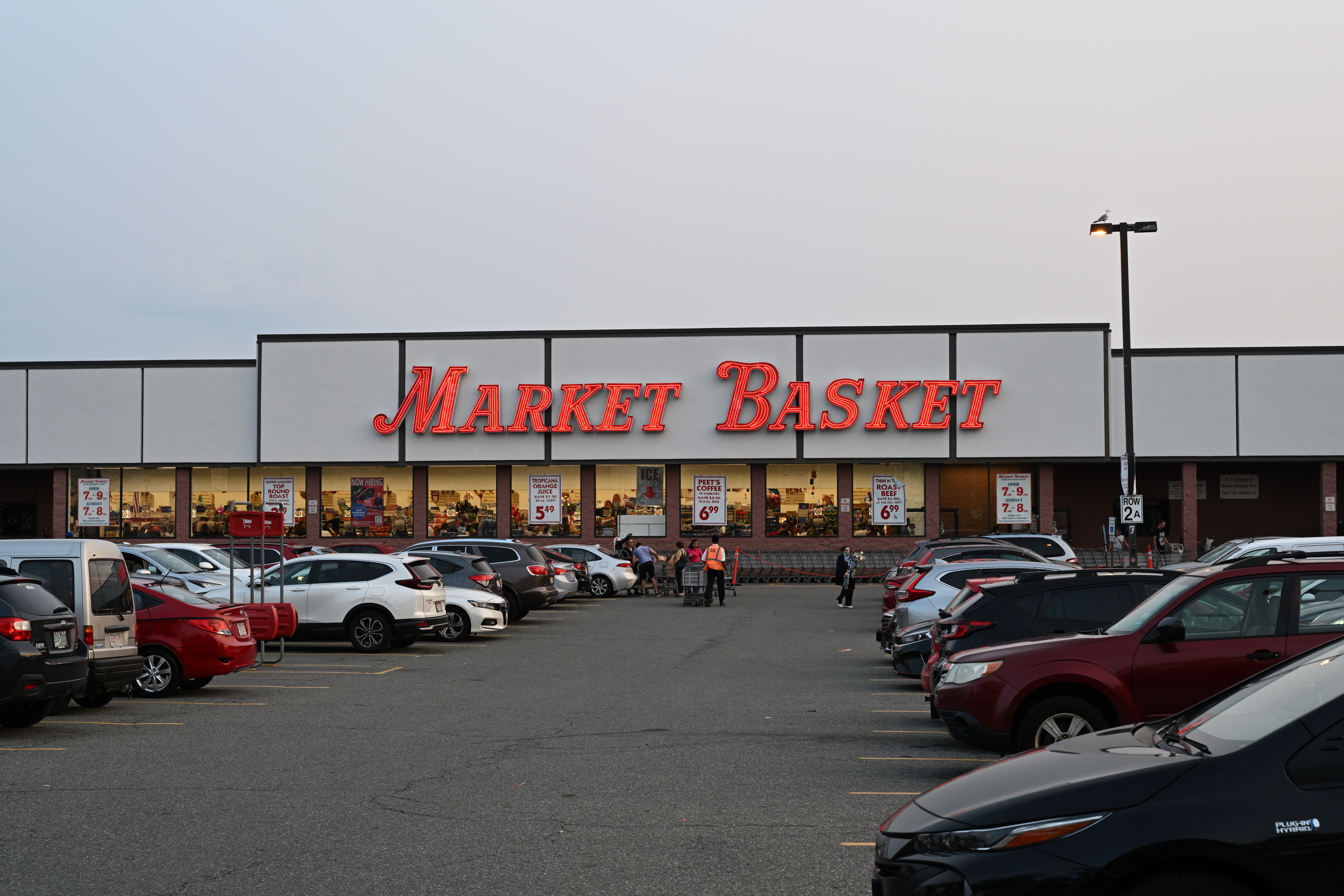
- A Market Basket store in Somerville, Massachusetts
- Trade name: Market Basket
- Type: Private
- Industry: Retail (Grocery)
- Founded: 1917 (109 years ago) in Lowell, Massachusetts, United States
- Founder: Telemachus "Mike" Demoulas
- Headquarters: Tewksbury, Massachusetts, United States
- Number of locations: 90 (2025)
- Area served: New Hampshire, Massachusetts, Maine, Rhode Island
- Key people: Bruce C. Casassa (President) Michael Kettenbach, Director of operations
- Products: Bakery, Market's Kitchen, Markets Café, Deli, Seafood, Meat, Dairy, Frozen Foods, Grocery, Health & Beauty, Produce, Beer & Wine (Note: New Hampshire and Maine stores, and the MB Spirits locations of Tewksbury, Shrewsbury, Danvers, Waltham, and Hanover Massachusetts.)
- Revenue: US$8.00 billion (2024)
- Owners: Frances Demoulas; Glorianne Demoulas; Arthur T. Demoulas; Caren Demoulas
- Number of employees: 30,000 (2025)
- Website: shopmarketbasket.com

Demoulas Super Markets, Inc., under the trade name Market Basket, is a chain of supermarkets in the United States, headquartered in Tewksbury, Massachusetts. As of 2025, the chain had 90 locations across New Hampshire, Massachusetts, Maine, and Rhode Island.

From 1990 through late August 2014, the company was the center of a controversy over ownership and leadership, which culminated in protests receiving international media attention. On August 27, 2014, an agreement was reached between its feuding owners to sell the 50.5% stake of the company owned by the family of Arthur S. Demoulas to his cousin Arthur T. Demoulas for $1.5 billion.

== History ==
The last use of the name Demoulas on a facade was on this former store in Salem, New Hampshire.

In 1917, Greek immigrants Athanasios ("Arthur") and Efrosini Demoulas opened Demoulas Market, a grocery store in the Acre neighborhood of Lowell, Massachusetts, that specialized in fresh lamb. In 1938, the store, which operated largely on credit due to the Great Depression, was being threatened with foreclosure. The Demoulases' youngest son, Telemachus, also known as Mike, either quit or was expelled from school and went to work at the store full-time. Eventually, the family earned the money needed to avoid foreclosure.

After World War II, Mike's older brother, George, also joined the family business. Also after the war, housing projects were constructed in the Acre, which resulted in a larger customer base for the Demoulases. In 1950, the Demoulas Brothers opened a new store to replace the original market. In 1954, they purchased the business from their parents. By 1956, the market's sales had jumped from $2,000 a year to $900,000 and the brothers began expanding. Within 15 years, the two brothers had transformed their parents' "mom and pop"-style store into a modern supermarket chain consisting of 15 stores.

On June 27, 1971, George Demoulas died of a heart attack while on vacation in Greece, making Mike the sole head of the Demoulas supermarket chain. Shortly thereafter, in an effort to skirt laws limiting the number of beer and wine licenses one supermarket chain could have, Mike Demoulas began opening stores under different names. These stores, which eventually became the Market Basket chain, were controlled entirely by Mike Demoulas and his family.

=== Lawsuits ===
In 1990, the widow and children of George Demoulas (including his son, Arthur S. Demoulas) sued Mike Demoulas, alleging that they had been defrauded out of their shares in the company. They claimed they had trusted Mike to take care of the family after George's death and that he exploited this trust in order to have them sell all of George's real estate and 84% of his shares in Demoulas Super Markets to members of his own family for pennies on the dollar. Mike Demoulas contended that his brother's heirs had willingly sold their shares in the company because they wanted money and their stock in Demoulas did not pay dividends. According to Mike Demoulas, George's widow, Evanthea, asked him to sell her shares so she could have money to raise her children, her son Evan sold his shares so he could begin an auto racing career in Europe, and her two daughters, Diana and Fotene, sold their shares after they saw how much money their brother received. However, once the company began paying dividends in 1988, the family saw how much money they could have made if they had kept their shares and sought to "rewrite history" in order to regain what they had sold. George's children acknowledged that they had signed many of the documents authorizing the sales and transfers, but stated they were not aware of what they were signing because they were too young to understand and trusted their uncle to take care of them. A jury found in favor of George's family.

A few weeks after the decision, George's son Arthur S. Demoulas filed a second suit, this time alleging that Mike Demoulas had diverted assets from the jointly owned family company, Demoulas Super Markets, to ones controlled by him and his children, including Market Basket. After an eighty-four-day bench trial, judge Maria Lopez found in favor of the plaintiffs. Lopez awarded George's family about $206 million for dividends on stock that had been improperly diverted and 50.5% of the company. She also ordered that all of the assets of Market Basket and the other companies controlled by Mike Demoulas and his family be transferred to Demoulas Super Markets and that Mike Demoulas be removed as president of the company.

In early September 1990, six bugs were found at the headquarters of Demoulas Super Markets. It was alleged that Arthur S. Demoulas had planted the bugs in order to listen to the legal strategy of the other side of the Demoulas family. Michael Kettenbach, the son-in law of Mike Demoulas, sued Arthur S. Demoulas, claiming that Demoulas had "invaded his privacy rights by having listening devices planted at DSM headquarters." In 1994, a jury found in favor of Arthur S. Demoulas. However, a new trial was granted after a woman came forward with new evidence—a recording of her boyfriend admitting to bugging the office for Arthur S. Demoulas. The case was damaged though when the woman admitted to being a crack cocaine addict who received about $500,000 in housing and other expenses from the family of Mike Demoulas and the man on the tape testified that he had been lying during the recorded conversation. On August 4, 1997, Arthur S. Demoulas was again cleared of wiretapping charges by a federal jury.

In 1991, George Demoulas's family sued Mike Demoulas, his son Arthur T. Demoulas, and Demoulas Super Markets, Inc. chief financial officer D. Harold Sullivan, alleging that the three violated the Employee Retirement Income Security Act of 1974 by using their positions as the trustees of the company's employee profit-sharing plan to make fiscally irresponsible real estate loans to friends and business associates. The United States Department of Labor filed a similar complaint six months later. On May 31, 1994, the Department of Labor announced that they had reached a settlement in which the trustees agreed to sell $22 million of the loans by July 11 or purchase them themselves as well as pay the plan $750,000 to make up for the dropped interest rates on the loans (unless the loan recipients paid the money instead). The trustees also agreed not to make any similar investments. The trustees admitted no wrongdoing in the case. Despite the heavy investment in risky real estate loans, the plan never posted a loss. In the civil case, Judge Rya W. Zobel ruled that the trustees' actions were "wrong but not corrupt" and that the settlement with the Department of Labor was "an adequate remedy". Therefore, she denied the request to have them removed.

In 1997 the Massachusetts Supreme Judicial Court upheld a lower court's ruling that Arthur T. Demoulas had presented the Demoulas Super Markets Board of Directors with “misleading, inaccurate, and materially incomplete” information in order to receive a rejection and keep his cousins from receiving any of the profits from Lee Drug, a pharmacy chain he started after the board rejected his proposal to start a pharmacy division of Market Basket.

In 1999, Mike Demoulas resigned as president due to a court order. He was succeeded by William Marsden.

=== Presidency of Arthur T. Demoulas ===
By 2002, Rafaele Evans, the widow of George's son Evan, was voting with Arthur T. Demoulas due to her displeasure with her brother-in-law, Arthur S. Demoulas, after he attempted to gain control of the trust that controlled her daughter's shares. This gave Arthur T. a majority vote on the board of directors. In 2008, Arthur T. Demoulas was named president and CEO of Demoulas Super Markets, Inc. During his tenure as CEO, sales grew from $3 billion a year to $4 billion, and the number of employees grew from 14,000 to 25,000. During the same time, competitors Stop & Shop and Shaw's closed many of their stores due to financial troubles. Market Basket also faced new competition from Wegmans, which opened its first Massachusetts store in 2011. On the employee front, Arthur T. was known for his ability to remember his associates' names, birthdays, and milestones, attending many of their weddings and funerals, checking in on ill employees, and asking about the spouses and children of his workers. He was seen as a father figure by a number of his employees and compared to It's a Wonderful Life protagonist George Bailey for his willingness to put people over profit.

Demoulas's opponents criticized him for being "openly defiant" of the board of directors and having a "dictatorial" management style. In a 2010 memo to the Board of Directors, Arthur S. Demoulas accused Arthur T. Demoulas of "plundering" millions by paying millions in excessive real estate prices for new Market Basket store locations. One example cited in the memo alleged that Arthur T. had recommended that the company pay $20.9 million to purchase a property in Bourne, Massachusetts, owned by an entity in which he was a major investor. After the sale, Arthur S. had the property appraised by a Boston real estate executive, who valued the property at $9 million. He also accused Arthur T. of paying "grossly excessive fees" to Retail Development and Management Inc., a real estate firm owned by his brothers-in-law Michael Kettenbach and Joseph Pasquale that oversaw Market Basket's real estate and helped it develop new stores. He and his attorneys argued that the 7.5% of the total development costs "was far in excess" of the prevailing market rate of 2% to 3%.

Arthur T. denied his cousin's claim. He argued that Arthur S. trumped up the charges in order to take control of the company and pay himself and the other shareholders more money. Attorneys for Arthur T. noted that Cushman & Wakefield later appraised the Bourne property at $25.5 million. Arthur T. also defended his arrangement with Kettenbach and Pasquale, which he said allowed Market Basket to purchase properties without alerting its competitors, thus avoiding a bidding war and saving the company money.

In 2011, the Board of Directors hired Mel L. Greenberg, a retired judge, to investigate Arthur S.'s claims. Greenberg found that there was no wrongdoing by Arthur T. in the purchase of real estate (including the Bourne property) that the fees paid to Retail Development and Management were not excessive. However, he did find that Arthur T. and the Board of Directors had neglected their fiduciary duties by not looking into whether or not the company would have been better off if it had exercised its option to purchase its store in Somersworth, New Hampshire, instead of renting it from a company in which Arthur T. and his family owned a 55% stake.

=== 2014 firing of Arthur T. Demoulas and protests ===
Decades of resentment and legal spats between cousins Arthur S. and Arthur T. Demoulas came to a head in mid-2013, when Evans switched loyalties, tipping the majority vote from Arthur T. to Arthur S. On July 18, 2013, the board did not take up a motion to remove Arthur T. as CEO after protesters gathered outside the meeting. Five days later, the board voted to distribute $250 million to family shareholders, an action opposed by Arthur T. In March 2014, two board members elected by Arthur T., William Shea and Terence Carleton, skipped a board meeting in which it was anticipated that there could be a vote to remove Arthur T. as CEO. Arthur S.'s side of the family sued Shea and Carelton, alleging they had boycotted the meeting. A Suffolk Superior Court judge ruled that Shea and Darman were required to attend the next meeting.

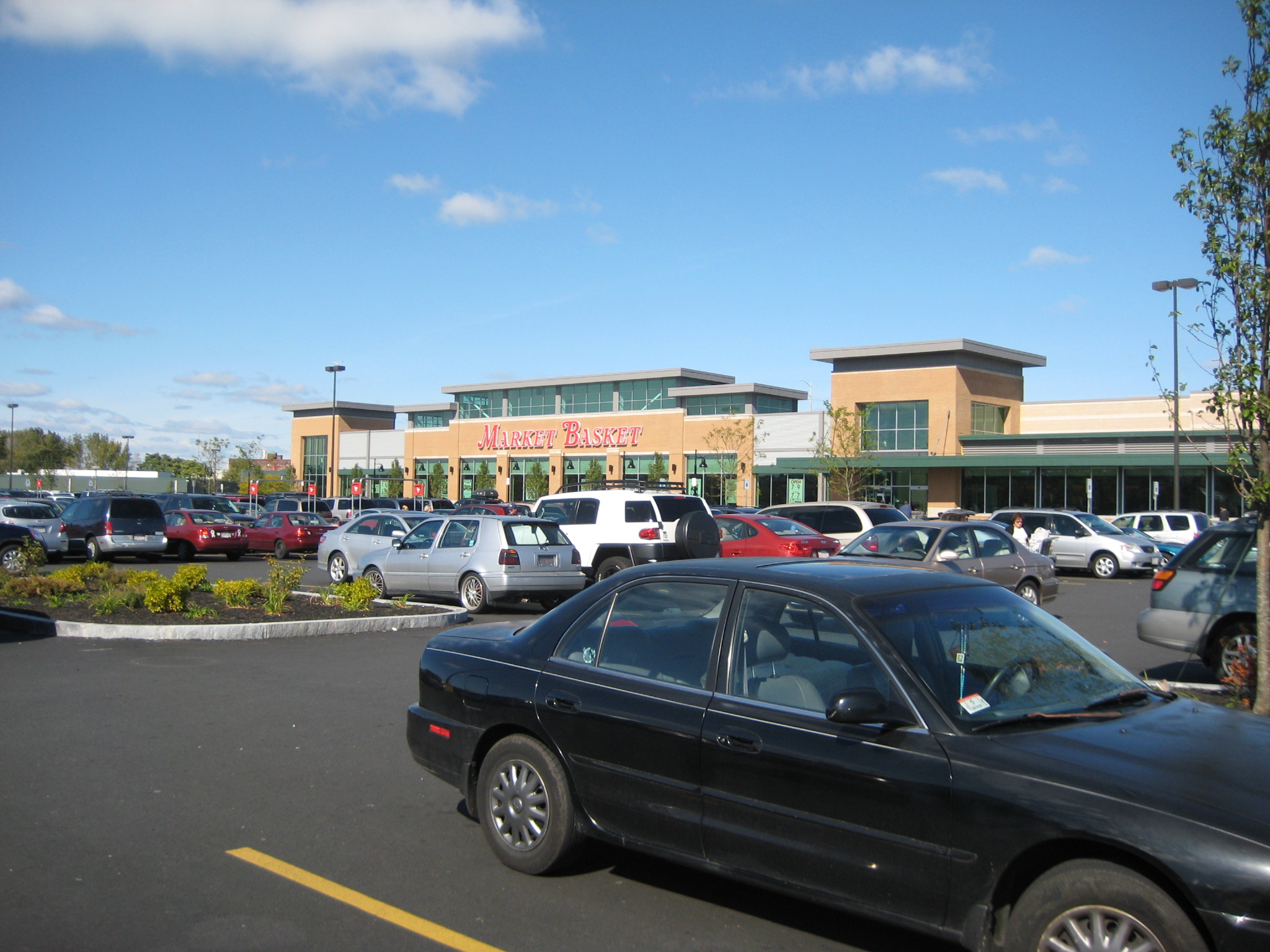
Market Basket's flagship store in Chelsea, Massachusetts, site of June 24 rally

On June 23, 2014, three top-level executives—CEO Arthur T. Demoulas, Vice President Joseph Rockwell, and Director of Operations William Marsden—were fired by the board. The Chief Executive position was filled with James Gooch, a former Radio Shack executive, and Felicia Thornton, formerly of supermarket company Albertsons, sharing the position. In response, six high-level managers resigned, and 300 employees held a rally outside Market Basket's Chelsea, Massachusetts, flagship store on June 24.

Beginning on July 18, 2014, additional protests with as many as 5,000 employees and customers were held at the company's Tewksbury headquarters and other locations demanding the reinstatement of Arthur T. Many supermarket, warehouse and corporate office workers including delivery truck drivers went on strike, leaving many shelves bare empty at many Market Basket locations. On July 20, seven employees were fired for their roles in organizing the protests. In the midst of the protests, Arthur T. offered to buy the entire company from his cousins, an offer that the board (controlled by Arthur S.'s family) said it would consider. The board was reportedly also reviewing additional offers.

On July 28, 2014, The Boston Globe reported that Arthur T. Demoulas was the only remaining bidder for the 50.5% stake of the company held by the family of Arthur S. Demoulas. All previous offers by outside parties to buy the company had been withdrawn and the board was reportedly "furiously negotiating" with Arthur T. to resolve the situation. The board denied this report, claiming that several offers were still being considered.

On August 17, 2014, Massachusetts governor Deval Patrick and New Hampshire governor Maggie Hassan met with both sides of the feud in an attempt to broker a deal. On August 22, Arthur T. and his sisters made a $1.5 billion offer for the 50.5% of shares owned by the opposing side of the family; several subsequent days of negotiations initially failed to reach an accord. Some analysts estimated the company to be in "dire" financial straits due to the weeks of protests.

On August 27, 2014, the shareholders of Market Basket reached a deal to sell the remaining 50.5% shares of the company to Arthur T. Demoulas and his sisters for $1.5 billion. According to Fortune, Demoulas was backed by The Blackstone Group, a private equity firm that put up over $500 million towards the purchase price. However, according to the Boston Globe, a source reported the deal was funded with debt, not private equity.

Felicia Thornton and Jim Gooch remained as the Chief Executives of the company but Arthur T. was given full operational authority until the deal closed. On December 12, 2014, it was announced that the deal was complete.

=== 2025 management dispute ===
On May 28, 2025, CEO Arthur T. Demoulas along with two of his children and several other executives were placed on administrative leave after it was alleged that he was planning to disrupt the business and operations of Market Basket with a work stoppage. Board member Michael Keyes later revealed that was due to succession plan and stated that "a business run for the next 50 years with an autocrat making all the decisions? That was the bottom line." Kimberly Eddleston, a professor at Northeastern University, compared the ousting to an episode of the television series Succession and said that "the family infighting, the dysfunction from brothers, cousins, siblings; that absolute discord, not learning from past mistakes. That's a real similarity, that shows you the lack of trust between family members, and the lack of communication, too. It just created all this conflict and tension. The board definitely sees some different visions." Eddleston later said that roughly 60 percent of family-owned businesses don't have a succession plan and that "the leader has one in his head, but doesn't communicate it, which is just as damaging." Two of the suspended executives said that "they wanted to be part of something greater." Subsequently, they visited two stores in New Hampshire, a move that the board called a "pre-planned attack". The board gave the executive a final warning not to enter any stores.

Social media users speculated that the sisters could be looking to cash out, though the three board members aligned with them claimed that is not the case. Grant Welker from the Boston Business Journal said that Market Basket may be better run by someone not in Demoulas family. Board member Bill Shea had been accused of blind loyalty to the family as well giving information improperly. Shea also claimed there was a conspiracy between the board and the media and stated that they were "to discredit Artie and his team into a damaging media circus." A "Save Market Basket" Facebook group was created in response to Arthur T. Demoulas being put on leave.

In September 2025, the board of directors announced they had fired Arthur T. Demoulas. In a statement, released via his representative, Justine Griffin, he expressed his disappointment in the failed mediation attempts, while also calling the board's attempts "not a good faith effort". In October 2025, Arthur T. Demoulas filed a lawsuit against the company in an attempt to be reinstated as CEO. A Delaware judge ruled that the firing was justified in April 2026, and the board of directors appointed longtime employee Chuck Casassa as president.

== Market Basket today ==
As of September 2025, Market Basket operates 90 stores within four states — Massachusetts, New Hampshire, Maine and Rhode Island. The chain's footprint encompasses an area radiating from the original stores in Lowell and stretching along the New England coastline from Cape Cod to southern Maine, to as far west as just shy of the Vermont state line and as far north as North Conway, New Hampshire. The first Maine location opened in Biddeford in August 2013, shortly before projects stalled between 2013 and 2014 due to the family disputes over company operations. After President Arthur T. Demoulas and his sisters gained control of the company in August 2014, Demoulas announced that he hoped to open two or three of the stalled stores by the end of the year. Within five years, Market Basket opened stores in Athol, Attleboro, Fall River, Littleton, Plymouth, Revere and Waltham, with Revere being the first to open following the protests, on October 26, 2014. The company continued expanding throughout New England, reaching 85 stores in 2021 along with their first two Rhode Island stores in Warwick and Johnston. However, in June 2022 Market Basket closed one of their stores in Billerica.

In their 2017 ratings, Consumer Reports ranked Market Basket at #2 among national supermarkets, second only to Wegmans. Employees who work more than 1,000 hours a year are eligible to enter a profit-sharing program. Employees also receive benefits, including healthcare and paid sick leave, and no employees belong to any trade union. Market Basket does not use supermarket loyalty cards, nor does it typically feature pharmacies within its stores. Further, Market Basket does not have self-checkout lanes. Company President Arthur T. Demoulas stated that he wanted "a human being waiting on a human being". Until 2017, Market Basket did not have an official company website or any online presence. An independent website started by a customer filled the void and contained weekly specials and store locations and hours. On October 24, 2017, the company launched their first website as well as social media accounts on Facebook, Twitter, and Instagram.
