= Geraldo (talk show) =

American television talk show

- Logo used from 1987 to 1996
- Also known as: The Geraldo Rivera Show
- Genre: Talk show
- Directed by: Don McSorley
- Presented by: Geraldo Rivera
- Country of origin: United States
- Original language: English
- No. of seasons: 11
- No. of episodes: 2,163

Production
- Executive producers: Bonnie Kaplan (1987–1988); Martin Berman (1988–1995); Jose Pretlow (1995–1998)
- Production locations: Rialto Theatre (1987–1990); CBS Broadcast Center (1990–1998)
- Running time: 42–43 minutes
- Production companies: Investigative News Group; Tribune Entertainment

Original release
- Network: Syndication
- Release: September 7, 1987 – May 8, 1998

Geraldo is an American daytime talk show that was hosted by Geraldo Rivera. The show ran in syndication for eleven seasons from September 7, 1987, to May 8, 1998, in which it broadcast 2,163 episodes. The show premiered as a tabloid talk show, in which Rivera moderated single-issue panel discussions with everyday people. Guests discussed their personal experiences over a given topic, often controversial or sensational, with Rivera placing a heavy emphasis on audience interaction. For its final two seasons, the show reformatted into a news-oriented program under the title The Geraldo Rivera Show. The show's first three seasons were taped at the Rialto Theatre in Manhattan; production then relocated uptown to the CBS Broadcast Center, where the show was taped for the remainder of its run.

The show was produced by Investigative News Group and Tribune Entertainment, the latter of whom also served as its distributor. Rivera was offered his own talk show after he hosted the Tribune Entertainment television special The Mystery of Al Capone's Vaults, which was the highest-rated syndicated show in television history. The show received high ratings in the early 1990s; however, it suffered a decline in ratings following its reformat. The show was canceled in 1998.

== Format ==
Geraldo is an hour-long daytime talk show that was hosted by journalist Geraldo Rivera.

== Production ==
=== Conception and development ===
In 1986, Geraldo Rivera hosted The Mystery of Al Capone's Vaults, a live television special that centered on the unsealing of mobster Al Capone's vault at the Lexington Hotel. The special was critically panned after it was revealed that the vault was empty; however, it became the highest-rated syndicated show in television history. The success of the special led to Rivera receiving numerous offers from television syndicators. Rivera decided to host a talk show as he wanted a platform that allowed him "to affect [the audience's] lives or affect an issue or affect the TV landscape."

=== Topic selection ===
In its first few seasons, the show featured controversial topics, such as "Men in Lace Panties", "Kids Who Murder in the Name of Satan", "When the Other Woman Is a Man", and "Teens Who Trade Sex for Drugs". However, Rivera claimed that the show's topics had become "positively G-rated" by 1994.

=== Guest and audience recruitment ===
The show provided counseling to some guests. In 1992, the show launched an aftercare referral service for guests who did not have the resources to pursue treatment of their own.

According to executive producer Martin Berman, "The audience can take an otherwise ordinary show and make it extraordinary. They can often be better than the people we have booked. And that's because they are the only thing we can't plan."

== Broadcast history and release ==
Geraldo was syndicated worldwide. In the United States, it was distributed by Tribune Entertainment and placed in first-run syndication on September 7, 1987. The show was broadcast on approximately 60 television stations nationwide. By January 1988, the show's coverage increased to 120 television stations and it was renewed for a second season.

In January 1990, the show was renewed for another season; however, some stations waited to renew their contracts in hopes that the show would tone down its topics.

The show reached the milestone of its 1,000th episode on September 21, 1992.

In August 1994, Tribune Entertainment renewed the show for five more years.

The show's final episode was broadcast on May 8, 1998; it was a retrospective of both the show and Rivera's broadcasting career. The show broadcast a total of 2,163 episodes.

== Reception ==
=== Television viewership and ratings ===
"Young Hate Mongers" averaged a 13.9 rating and a 39 share in 18 major television markets, which were "numbers virtually unheard of for daytime programs."

=== Critical response ===
Howard Rosenberg of the Los Angeles Times claimed that the show was "frequently dull [] and always derivative."

New York listed it as one of the worst television shows of 1995.

=== Awards and nominations ===
Awards and nominations
Award	Year (Note: Indicates the year of ceremony)	Category	Nominee(s)	Result	Ref.
GLAAD Media Awards	1998	Outstanding TV Talk	"Ellen Coming Out: Celebration or Catastrophe?"	Nominated	

== Controversy ==
On November 3, 1988, an episode involving white supremacists, Skinheads Against Racial Prejudice, black activists, and Jewish activists was aired. A confrontation between John Metzger (the son of Tom Metzger) and Roy Innis (in which Metzger goaded Innis by referring to him as "Uncle Tom") led to Innis walking over showing signs of aggression and forcefully grabbing Metzger by the neck after Metzger stood up, and subsequently, a full-scale brawl broke out. Audience members, several stage hands, and Rivera himself got involved. In the process, Rivera was struck in the face by a chair, then punched in the nose by white supremacist Wyatt Kaldenberg; he wound up with a nasal fracture. He did not press charges, saying he did not wish to be "tied up with the roaches", and also claiming "if there ever was a case of deserved violence, this was it".

The ratings for this show increased as news of the fight attracted attention to the episode even before it aired.

In August 1992, Rivera scuffled with KKK members again at a Klan rally in Janesville, Wisconsin. Rivera suffered cuts and a bite to his left thumb.
