= Joseph Wapner =

American reality court show judge (1919–2017)

- Born: Joseph Albert Wapner; November 15, 1919; Los Angeles, California, U.S.
- Died: February 26, 2017 (aged 97); Los Angeles, California, U.S.
- Resting place: Mount Sinai Memorial Park Cemetery, Los Angeles
- Education: University of Southern California; USC Gould School of Law
- Occupations: Judge; television personality
- Years active: 1959–2010
- Television: The People's Court (1981–1993)
- Spouse: Mildred Nebenzahl Wapner (m. 1946)
- Children: 3

Judge of the Los Angeles County Superior Court
- In office December 6, 1961 – November 16, 1979
- Appointed by: Pat Brown
- Preceded by: Seat established
- Succeeded by: Jacqueline Weiss

Joseph Albert Wapner (November 15, 1919 – February 26, 2017) was an American judge and television personality. He is best known as the first presiding judge of the reality court show The People's Court. The show's first run in syndication, with Judge Wapner presiding as judge, ran from 1981 to 1993, for 12 seasons and 2,340 episodes. Although the show's second run was presided over by multiple judges, Wapner was the sole judge to preside during the show's first incarnation. His tenure on the program made him the first jurist of arbitration-based reality court shows, which evolved into the most popular trend in the judicial genre and continues to be to the present.

== Early life ==
Joseph Albert Wapner was born on November 15, 1919, in Los Angeles, California, to Jewish parents who had immigrated there; his father, attorney Joseph Max Wapner (1898–1992), was from Romania, while his mother, Fannie (née Friedman) (1901-1990), was from Russia. Wapner had a younger sister named Irene. Wapner attended Hollywood High School and once dated actress Lana Turner while in high school.

Wapner was a graduate of the University of Southern California (1941) and the USC Law School (1948), serving in World War II in between. Wapner was awarded the Purple Heart and the Bronze Star while serving in the South Pacific in Cebu. He was honorably discharged from the U.S. Army as a lieutenant. While at U.S.C. Wapner was initiated into the Tau Gamma chapter of the Tau Epsilon Phi fraternity.

== Career ==
=== Legal career ===
Wapner was an attorney in private practice for ten years.

Appointed by Governor Pat Brown to the Los Angeles Municipal Court in 1959, Wapner served two years before being elevated to the Los Angeles County Superior Court on December 6, 1961, where he served for 18 years before retiring. While serving on the Superior Court bench, Wapner served as presiding judge in 1969 and 1970. Wapner was also president of the California Judges Association in 1975 and 1976 and retired from the court on November 16, 1979.

=== The People's Court ===
Wapner was the first judge to preside over the court show The People's Court. His tenure on the program lasted from 1981 to 1993, making for 2,340 half-hour episodes. On the series, he conducted a binding arbitration that was set up to resemble a small claims court by pitting parties, without lawyers, against each other. The legacy of the show's high popularity has led to various other similar syndicated courtroom shows, such as Judge Judy and Hot Bench, among others.

After 12 seasons on The People's Court, Wapner was not invited back to the series in 1993, when the ratings had dropped to an all-time low. After a four-year hiatus, beginning in 1993, The People's Court returned to the air in 1997, and aired until July 2023. Ed Koch, former mayor of New York City, served as judge from September 1997 until June 1999; Jerry Sheindlin from September 1999 until March 2001; and Marilyn Milian from March 2001 until July 2023.

Wapner stated that he was told years later that the producers did not want to hurt his feelings; however, he noted that this is precisely what the show did. Wapner also said he was not notified when the producers revamped the series. He declined to offer opinions on the People's Court judges who succeeded him, as he never watched the revamped program.

On November 12, 2009, Wapner received a star on the Hollywood Walk of Fame. He and Judith Sheindlin of the television court show Judge Judy were the only two television jurists who have received the honor as of 2009. Wapner was publicly critical of Sheindlin's courtroom adjudicating approach.

On November 13, 2009, in honor of his 90th birthday on November 15, Wapner made a one-time-only return to the court show, acting as a guest judge, presiding over a case in the Marilyn Milian era of The People's Court.

Until the summer of 2013, Wapner also held the title of longest-reigning arbiter over The People's Court. However, by completion of the court show's 2012–2013 season, Milian captured this title from him and became the longest-reigning judge in the series. Milian remained on the show until its cancellation in July 2023.

=== Other media appearances and endeavors ===
Five years after presiding over The People's Court, Wapner returned to television as a judge in spin-off nontraditional courtroom series Judge Wapner's Animal Court, lasting for two seasons (1998–1999 and 1999–2000) on Animal Planet.

Wapner authored a book, A View from the Bench (1987, Simon and Schuster, ISBN 9780671638733).

On the back cover, Alice Cooper's 1983 album "DaDa" has "Special Thanks to Judge Joseph A. Wapner".

On June 27, 1986, Wapner appeared on the Tonight Show to hear a case of David Letterman vs. Johnny Carson over alleged damage to the headlight of Letterman's pickup truck when Carson had the truck towed to the studio. Wapner ruled in favor of Letterman, granting him $24.95.

In 1995 he appeared as an alternate-universe version of himself as Commissar of a "People's Court" in a Soviet-controlled California in an early episode of Sliders.

=== Endorsements ===
During 1999–2000, Wapner served as the national spokesperson for Singer Asset Finance Company, LLC, a specialty finance company, appearing in national television commercials and print ads.

Since around 2010, the soda company Rocket Fizz has marketed a beverage, Judge Wapner Cream Soda, featuring the slogan, "I sentence you to drink my cream soda."

== Personal life, final years and death ==
Wapner was active in Jewish causes, including sitting on the board of a Jewish school. He was married to Mildred “Mickey” Wapner (née Nebenzahl) for 71 years, from 1946 until his death in 2017. Their daughter Sarah died from heart disease in May 2015 at age 56. They also had two sons who became attorneys: David Miron-Wapner and Frederick Nathan Wapner, the latter of whom was a prosecutor and L.A. district attorney who also became a judge (including with the Los Angeles County Superior Court). Wapner also had four grandchildren and one great-grandchild.

Wapner died from respiratory failure on February 26, 2017, at his home in Los Angeles. He was 97 years old. He is interred at Mount Sinai Memorial Park Cemetery in Los Angeles.

Legal offices
First	Judge of The People's Court; 1981–1993	Succeeded by Ed Koch (in the 1997 revival)
