= Sheindlin =

Sheindlin is a surname. Notable people with the surname include:

- Jerry Sheindlin (born 1933), American author, television personality, and attorney, husband of Judy
- Judy Sheindlin (born 1942), also known as Judge Judy, American lawyer, judge, and television personality
