= Doug Llewelyn =

American reality court show announcer (born 1938)

- Born: Douglas Steele Llewelyn; November 26, 1938 (age 87); Baltimore, Maryland, U.S.
- Education: University of South Carolina
- Occupations: Reporter; television personality
- Years active: 1960–present
- Known for: The People's Court
- Spouse: Dale Waterson (m. 1962)
- Children: 2

Douglas Steele Llewelyn (born November 26, 1938) is an American television personality, best known as the original host of the court show The People's Court from 1981 to 1993. Previously a news reporter, Llewelyn has produced numerous television specials, including The Mystery of Al Capone's Vaults in 1986, and launched Judge Judy in 1996. Llewelyn subsequently returned to hosting The People's Court from 2016 to 2023.

== Early life and early career ==
Llewelyn was born in Maryland in 1938 and later moved to Lancaster, South Carolina with his family, and attended the University of South Carolina. He became an announcer at a South Carolina station, WLCM in Lancaster, while still in high school, and then moved to New York City, working as a page for Perry Como, and later moving to work for Chet Huntley in the news room. He also worked in New York as a producer for the Long John Nebel Show on WNBC Radio, and as a radio reporter for Armed Forces Radio.

== Career ==
After eight years working in New York, Llewelyn moved to the Washington, D.C. market, working at WDCA-TV (an independent station), and then WTOP (a CBS affiliate), as a news reporter on TV and radio. He was eventually hosting a talk show called "Nine in the Morning", and producing specials under the title "Doug's World". In 1976, he moved to KNXT (now KCBS-TV), the Los Angeles CBS network station, and began co-hosting the show "Noontime."

In 1981, he was chosen to be the courtroom reporter for a new syndicated court room series, The People's Court. Llewelyn would introduce the litigants of each case, get audience input before a verdict, and interview the litigants as they exited the courtroom. The success of the show made Llewelyn well known, including for his catchphrase at the end of every episode, "Don’t take the law into your own hands — you take 'em to court". However, he concluded some episodes by saying, "If someone files a lawsuit against you and yet you're convinced you've done nothing wrong, don't be intimidated. The best policy is to go to court and stand up for your rights."

In 1986, Llewelyn was a producer of The Mystery of Al Capone's Vaults, which became the highest-rated ever syndicated television show at the time. Though he was a primary arranger behind the program, he did not want to host it himself, leading to the search for a "big name", and landing on Geraldo Rivera. He also produced the Return to Titanic live special in 1987.

After the first run of The People's Court ended, and after doing coverage for the O. J. Simpson trial, Llewelyn helped create the Judge Judy show in 1996 and was a supervising producer during its first season.

Llewelyn rejoined The People's Court in the reporter role in 2016, taking over for Curt Chaplin, who was reporter from 1997 to 2016 as well as narrator; however Chaplin remained in the narrator role even after Llewelyn's return. He remained on the show until its cancellation in July 2023.

== Other work ==
Llewelyn has had cameo appearances in a number of films, TV shows, music videos, and has appeared in many commercials. He made a brief appearance in the film All the President's Men. He is the announcer in the 1992 music video for the Nirvana song In Bloom, and appears in the 1994 "Weird Al" Yankovic video for "Headline News". Other cameos include playing a parade announcer in National Lampoon's Christmas Vacation (1989) and store manager in Ice Cream Man (1995) (including a line where he says "by the way, you're not going to take us to court, are you?").

Away from the television screen, Llewelyn also co-created a business in 1980 called the "Electronic Press Kit" for movies. They did press kits for over 200 movies, including E.T. the Extra-Terrestrial (1982), where director Steven Spielberg would also ask Llewelyn about People's Court cases he'd seen. He later moved into doing in-house television segments for companies.

== Personal ==
Llewelyn has lived in Hendersonville, North Carolina since around 1997. He has two grown daughters with his wife, Dale.
