= Equal Justice with Judge Eboni K. Williams =

American syndicated court show

- Genre: Court show
- Created by: Byron Allen
- Directed by: Marty James
- Starring: Eboni K. Williams (judge); Elijah Barnes III (bailiff)
- Narrated by: Curt Chaplin
- Country of origin: United States
- Original language: English
- No. of seasons: 4

Production
- Executive producers: Byron Allen; Carolyn Folks; Jennifer Lucas; Eboni K. Williams; Patricia J. Wilson
- Camera setup: Multiple
- Running time: 19 minutes
- Production company: Allen Media Group

Original release
- Network: First-run syndication
- Release: September 11, 2023 – present

Equal Justice with Judge Eboni K. Williams is an American syndicated court show produced by Allen Media Group and premiered on September 11, 2023.

== Production ==
In January 2023, it was announced that Equal Justice would launch in fall 2023 and would be available on broadcast on television stations, and also global cable, network, and digital platforms. At 40 years old, Williams became the youngest judge in the daytime syndicated court show space. This court show was one of 4 new court shows of the 2023 season, the other 3 being Cutlers Court, Justice for the People with Judge Milian and Mathis Court with Judge Mathis. The show was cleared in more than 90% of American broadcast TV markets.

In May 2025, this show along with the other Allen Media Group court shows were renewed for 2 more seasons, running through the 2026–27 television season.
