= Justice for the People with Judge Milian =

American reality court show

- Genre: Court show
- Presented by: Judge Marilyn Milian
- Narrated by: Curt Chaplin
- Country of origin: United States
- No. of seasons: 3
- No. of episodes: 255

Production
- Camera setup: Multiple
- Running time: 30 minutes
- Production company: Allen Media Group

Original release
- Network: Syndication
- Release: September 11, 2023 – present

Justice for the People with Judge Milian is an American court show presided by Judge Marilyn Milian, a retired Florida Circuit Court judge and court-show arbitrator. The show follows a similar format to its predecessor, The People's Court, which Milian presided from March 12, 2001 until the show's cancellation on July 21, 2023.

== Production ==
In April 2023, it was reported that Allen Media Group had signed Milian to preside a new courtroom series, Justice for the People with Judge Milian; the show premiered in syndication on September 11, 2023.

On May 5, 2025, Justice for the People with Judge Milian was renewed for two more seasons, taking the show through the 2026–27 television season.

== Awards ==
In July 2025, the show was nominated for an Emmy Award.
