= Curt Chaplin =

American TV and radio personality

Curt Chaplin is an American TV personality and baseball documentary narrator. He began his career as a radio news and sports reporter in New York City in the 1970s, later becoming a New York radio personality, working with Howard Cosell, Don Imus, Howard Stern and many others, and was the sports reporter/sidekick on WNEW-FM's popular Rock 'n Roll Morning Show from 1986 to 1991.

Chaplin claims to have provided via cassette recording an audio play-by-play for one of the most famous moments in American sports history—the Miracle on Ice hockey game during the 1980 Winter Olympics at Lake Placid, New York. The underdog United States national team defeated the Soviet Union national team 4–3 in the semifinal round, beating a team that had won six of the previous seven Olympic gold medals. Chaplin, in an interview, notes that he was assigned to cover the game as a sports reporter for ABC News Radio, not a play-by-play announcer. However, he thought the game might be significant and found a spot near a TV camera to stand and narrate the game into his cassette recorder. His call of the game is now part of an exhibit about the game at the Hockey Hall of Fame.

Chaplin has voiced numerous national commercials and home videos, as well as documentaries for Major League Baseball, including the current series Baseball's Seasons. From 1982 until 1992, he served as the announcer for the USA Network's long-running USA Cartoon Express animation block. During the 1988–89 season, he served as host of the syndicated sports game show Grandstand (for which his former WNEW colleague Dave Herman served as announcer), and hosted the popular ESPN sports trivia game show "Designated Hitter" in 1993–94.

Chaplin served in the dual role of courtroom announcer and on-camera court reporter for the nationally syndicated TV series, The People's Court, for the first 19 seasons of the 1997 revival before the return of original court reporter Doug Llewelyn on the revived series' 20th season; he remained the show's announcer until its cancellation in July 2023.

As of 2023, he is now the announcer of Justice for the People with Judge Milian, Mathis Court with Judge Mathis and Equal Justice with Judge Eboni K. Williams.
