= Geraldo Rivera =

American attorney, journalist and talk show host (born 1943)

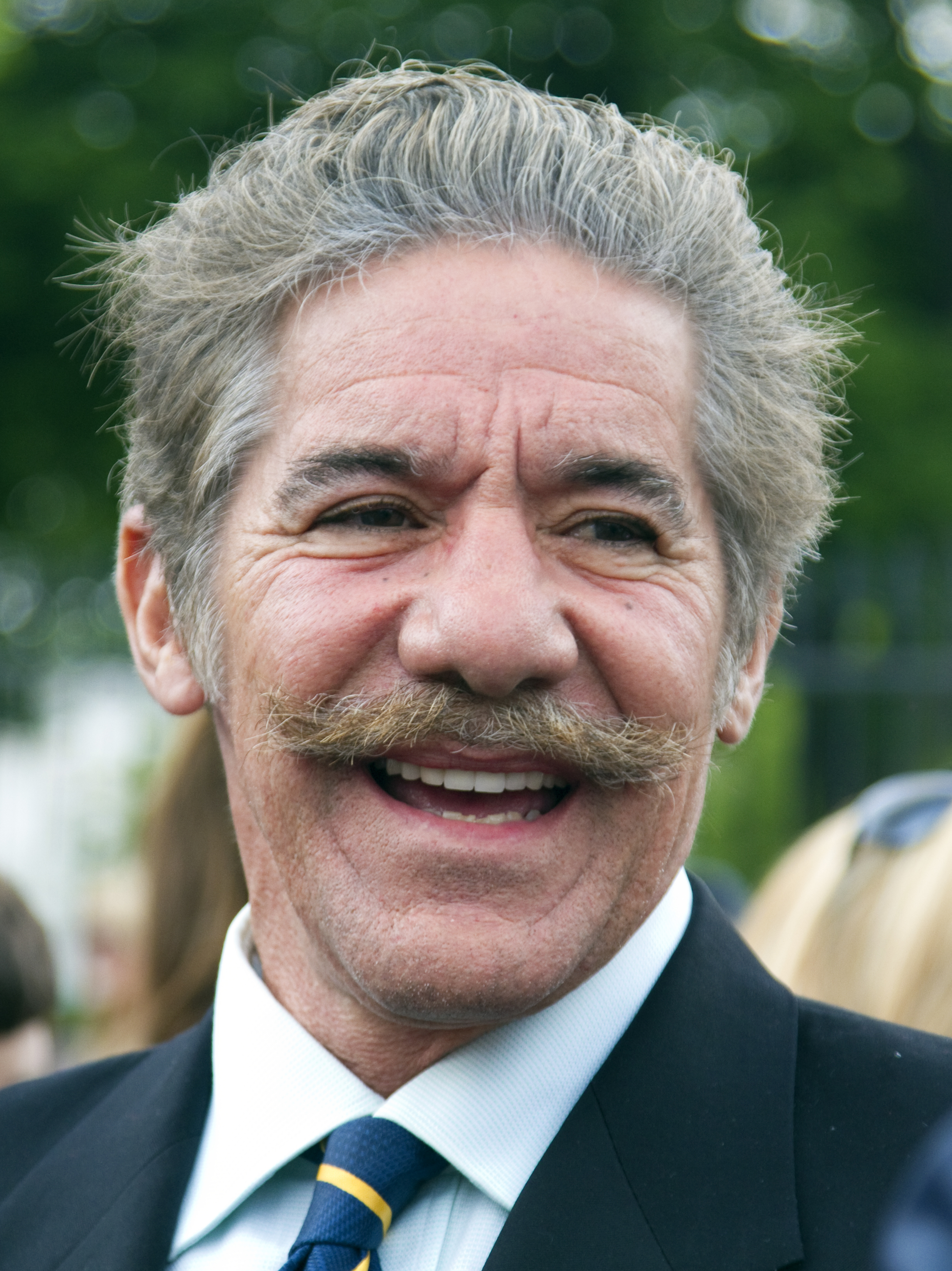
- Rivera in 2011
- Born: Gerald Michael Rivera; July 4, 1943 (age 83); New York City, U.S.
- Education: State University of New York Maritime College; University of Arizona (BS); Brooklyn Law School (JD)
- Occupations: talk show host, political commentator
- Years active: 1970–present
- Organization: NewsNation
- Television: Geraldo; Geraldo at Large; The Five; NewsNation
- Political party: Republican
- Spouses: Linda Coblentz (m. 1965; div. 1969); Edith Vonnegut (m. 1971; div. 1975); Sherryl Raymond (m. 1976; div. 1984); C.C. Dyer (m. 1987; div. 2000); Erica Michelle Levy (m. 2003)
- Children: 5
- Family: Craig Rivera (brother)
- Website: geraldo.com

Geraldo Michael Rivera (born Gerald Michael Rivera; July 4, 1943) is an American talk show host and political commentator who worked at the Fox News Channel from 2001 to 2023. He hosted the tabloid talk show Geraldo from 1987 to 1998. He gained publicity with the live 1986 TV special The Mystery of Al Capone's Vaults. Rivera hosted the news magazine program Geraldo at Large and hosts the occasional broadcast of Geraldo Rivera Reports (in lieu of hosting At Large). He served as a rotating co-host of The Five from 2022 to 2023.

== Early life ==
Geraldo Michael Rivera was born Gerald Michael Rivera at Beth Israel Medical Center on July 4, 1943, in Union Square, Manhattan New York City, the son of Lillian (née Friedman; 1924–2018) and Cruz "Allen" Rivera (1915–1987), a restaurant worker and taxicab driver respectively. He is of Galician ancestry through his father, who was from Puerto Rico. His mother was Ashkenazi Jewish, while his father was Roman Catholic. Rivera was raised "mostly Jewish" and had a bar mitzvah ceremony. He grew up in Williamsburg, Brooklyn and West Babylon, New York, where he attended West Babylon High School. Rivera's family was sometimes subjected to prejudice and racism, and his mother took to spelling their surname as "Riviera" to avoid having bigotry directed at them, although Riviera, Ribeira, Rivera, and Ribera are variations of the same name as spelled by Galician, Italian and Portuguese families.

When I was born, my mother filled in my birth certificate with the name Gerald Riviera, adding an extra "i" to my father's surname. She did the same thing for my sister Irene. Later, she would drop the pretense for my sister Sharon, only to pick it up again with the birth of my baby brother Craig. Whenever we asked about the inconsistencies, she would shrug shyly and joke her way out of it. "I just forgot how to spell it", she would say, and leave it at that. Underneath, I came to realize, she was deeply embarrassed over what was a clumsy attempt at an ethnic cover-up.

From 1961 to 1963, he attended the State University of New York Maritime College in where he was a member of the rowing team. Afterwards, he transferred to the University of Arizona, where he received a B.S. in business administration in 1965 and earned a varsity letter in lacrosse.

Following a series of jobs ranging from clothing salesman to short-order cook, Rivera enrolled at Brooklyn Law School in 1966. While a law student, he held internships with the New York County District Attorney under crime-fighter Frank Hogan and Harlem Assertion of Rights (a community-based provider of legal services) before receiving his J.D. near the top of his class in 1969. He then held a Reginald Heber Smith Fellowship in poverty law at the University of Pennsylvania Law School in the summer of 1969 before being admitted to the New York State Bar later that year.

After working with such organizations as the lower Manhattan-based Community Action for Legal Services and the National Lawyers Guild, Rivera became a frequent attorney for the East Harlem-based New York City chapter of the Young Lords, a Puerto Rican activist group, eventually precipitating his entry into private practice. This work attracted the attention of WABC-TV news director Al Primo when Rivera was interviewed about the group's occupation of a neighborhood church in 1969. Primo offered Rivera a job and he began to study introductory broadcast journalism under Fred Friendly in the Ford Foundation-funded Summer Program in Journalism for Members of Minority Groups at the Columbia University Graduate School of Journalism in 1970.

== Career ==
=== ABC News ===
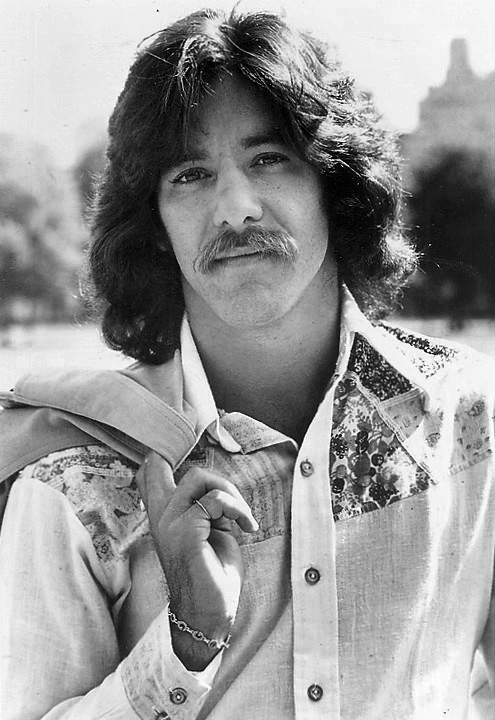
Rivera in the mid-1970s

Rivera was hired by WABC-TV in 1970 as a reporter for Eyewitness News. In 1972, he garnered national attention and won a Peabody Award for Willowbrook: The Last Great Disgrace, his report on the neglect and abuse of patients with intellectual disabilities at Staten Island's Willowbrook State School and Rockland County's Letchworth Village, and he began to appear on ABC national programs such as 20/20 and Nightline upon their launches in 1978 and 1979 respectively. After John Lennon watched Rivera's report on the patients at Willowbrook, he and Rivera put on a benefit concert called "One to One" on August 30, 1972, at Madison Square Garden in New York City (released posthumously for Lennon by Yoko Ono in 1986, as Live in New York City).

In July 1973, Rivera taped the pilot episode of Good Night America, a late-night newsmagazine that he hosted (and executive produced). It began its semi-regular airing from April 1974 to June 1977 as part of the ABC's Wide World of Entertainment program block. The show featured Ringo Starr's "It Don't Come Easy" as the theme. Good Night America tackled controversial topics of the era, including marijuana usage and the status of Vietnam War draft dodgers. The March 6, 1975 episode of the program, featuring Dick Gregory and Robert J. Groden, showed the first national telecast of the historic Zapruder film. All 33 episodes of Good Night America may be viewed and downloaded on Rivera's web site.

On May 19, 1983, Rivera broadcast the first American network television mention of "AIDS" by this name. (Other names had been used in the previous two years, as the disease was poorly understood at the time.) On 20/20, he interviewed New York City lighting designer Ken Ramsauer. Ramsauer died aged 28, four days later; Rivera delivered a eulogy at Ramsauer's Central Park memorial service.

In October 1985, ABC's Roone Arledge refused to air a report done by Sylvia Chase for 20/20 on the relationship between Marilyn Monroe and John and Robert F. Kennedy. Rivera publicly criticized Arledge's journalistic integrity, claiming that Arledge's friendship with the Kennedy family (for example, Pierre Salinger, a former Kennedy aide, worked for ABC News at the time) had caused him to spike the story; as a result, Rivera was fired. During a Fox News interview with Megyn Kelly aired May 15, 2015, Rivera stated the official reason given for the firing was that he violated ABC policy when he donated $200 to a non-partisan mayoral race candidate.

=== Talk shows, specials, and guest appearances ===
On April 21, 1986, Rivera hosted The Mystery of Al Capone's Vaults. The special broadcast was billed as the unearthing of mobster Al Capone's secret vaults, located under the old Lexington Hotel in Chicago. Millions of people watched the 2-hour show, which ultimately did not uncover any valuables from beneath the hotel. In a 2016 interview with the Chicago Tribune, Rivera commented, "It was an amazingly high profile program—maybe the highest profile program I've ever been associated with."

In 1987, Rivera began producing and hosting the daytime talk show Geraldo, which ran for 11 years. The show featured controversial guests and theatricality, which led to the characterization of his show as "trash TV" by Newsweek and two United States senators. In another special in 1988, Rivera's nose was broken by white supremacist Wyatt Kaldenberg in a well-publicized brawl during a show whose guests included white supremacists, antiracist skinheads, black nationalist Roy Innis, and militant Jewish activists.

In 1999, Rivera received an offer to host the game show Winning Lines on CBS, which was set to premiere in January 2000, but Rivera could not agree on the contract at the last minute and was replaced by Dick Clark.

From 1994 to 2001, Rivera hosted Rivera Live, a CNBC evening news and interview show which aired on weeknights.

Beginning in 1989, Rivera began making guest appearances as himself in various television series starting with the short-lived sitcom The People Next Door and the drama Thirtysomething. Among the shows that Rivera has shown up in include the comedies Empty Nest, Nurses, Men Behaving Badly, and The Critic (voice only). Rivera played himself in the Seinfeld series finale in 1998, and in My Name Is Earl (episodes "Inside Probe" parts 1 & 2) in 2009. He also appeared in the musical comedy-drama Glee and dramas such as Nash Bridges, The Sopranos, and Law & Order: Special Victims Unit. During the 1990s, Rivera also played a fictional version of himself in movies like Grumpier Old Men, Meet Wally Sparks, Contact, Cop Land, and Primary Colors.

In 2009, Rivera lent his voice to Phineas and Ferb, playing newscaster Morty Williams in the episode "Phineas and Ferb Get Busted!".

=== Fox News ===
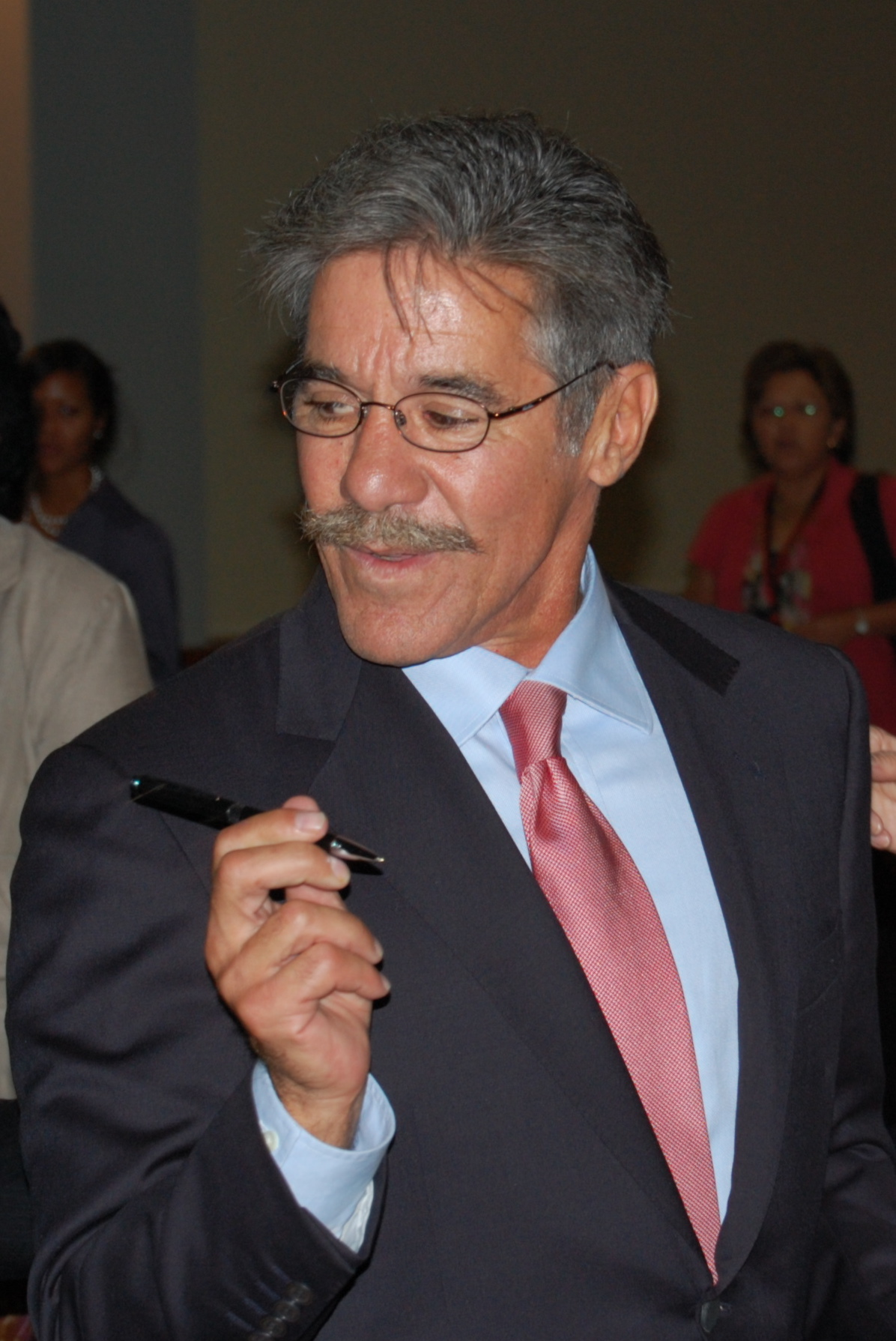
Rivera after delivering the keynote at the Congressional Hispanic Caucus Institute's 2008 Public Policy Conference

Rivera left CNBC in November 2001—two months after the September 11 terrorist attacks—to become a Fox News war correspondent. Rivera's brother Craig accompanied him as a cameraman on assignments in Afghanistan.

In 2001, during the War in Afghanistan, Rivera was derided for a report in which he claimed to be at the scene of a friendly fire incident; it was later revealed he was actually 300 miles away. Rivera blamed a minor misunderstanding for the discrepancy.

Controversy arose in early 2003, while Rivera was traveling with the 101st Airborne Division in Iraq. During a Fox News broadcast, Rivera began to disclose an upcoming operation, even going so far as to draw a map in the sand for his audience. The military immediately issued a firm denunciation of his actions, saying it put the operation at risk; Rivera was expelled from Iraq. Two days later, he announced that he would be reporting on the Iraq conflict from Kuwait.

In 2005, Rivera engaged in a feud with The New York Times over their allegations that he pushed aside a member of a rescue team in order to be filmed "assisting" a woman in a wheelchair down some steps in the aftermath of Hurricane Katrina. In the ensuing controversy, Rivera appeared on television and demanded a retraction from the Times. He further threatened to sue the paper if one was not provided. The Times later acknowledged that Rivera did not push the woman aside.

In 2007, Rivera was involved in a dispute with fellow Fox colleague Michelle Malkin. Malkin announced that she would not return to The O'Reilly Factor, claiming that Fox News had mishandled a dispute over derogatory statements Rivera had made about her in a Boston Globe interview. Rivera, while objecting to her views on immigration, said, "Michelle Malkin is the most vile, hateful commentator I've ever met in my life. She actually believes that neighbors should start snitching out neighbors, and we should be deporting people." He added, "It's good she's in D.C., and I'm in New York. I'd spit on her if I saw her." Rivera later apologized for his comments.

In 2008, Rivera's book, titled HisPanic: Why Americans Fear Hispanics in the U.S., was released.

On January 3, 2012, Rivera began hosting a weekday radio talk show on WABC (770 AM) in New York, N.Y. The show was scheduled in the two hours between Imus in the Morning and The Rush Limbaugh Show on WABC. On January 30, 2012, Rivera also began hosting a weekday show on KABC (790 AM) in Los Angeles.

On March 23, 2012, Rivera made comments regarding Trayvon Martin's hoodie and how the hoodie was connected to Martin's shooting death, specifically claiming that Martin would not have been shot if he was not wearing the hoodie, repeating them on subsequent occasions. Rivera apologized for any offense that he caused with the comments. His son Gabriel said that he was "ashamed". Some people found the apology disingenuous; among those who did not accept it was Rivera's longtime friend Russell Simmons. He later apologized to Trayvon Martin's parents as well.

In 2015, Rivera competed on the 14th season of the television series The Celebrity Apprentice, where he ultimately placed second to TV personality Leeza Gibbons. However, Rivera still raised the highest amount of money out of any contestant in the season, with $726,000, $12,000 more than Gibbons.

Rivera hosted the newsmagazine program Geraldo at Large and appears regularly on Fox News. On November 13, 2015, Rivera revealed on Fox that his daughter, Simone Cruickshank, was at the Stade de France when the attacks and explosions occurred; she and her friends made it out alive and would be returning safely home.

He continued to host a weekday talk radio show on WABC (770 AM) until a leadership change at parent company Cumulus Media resulted in his contract not being renewed in November 2015; Geraldo would later sue Cumulus for what he claimed was the reneging of a "handshake agreement" between him, previous chairman Lew Dickey and executive vice president John Dickey.

Rivera competed on season 22 of Dancing with the Stars, partnered with professional dancer Edyta Śliwińska. On March 28, 2016, Rivera and Śliwińska were the first couple to be eliminated from the competition. On November 29, 2017, Rivera defended Matt Lauer, who had been fired by NBC after inappropriate sexual behavior was alleged, by saying, "News is a flirty business." He later apologized after receiving heavy criticism. Part of the controversy stemmed from his 1991 book "Exposing Myself", which bragged about his active social life in the 1960s and 1970s. In a 1991 interview with Barbara Walters, actress Bette Midler accused Rivera and one of his producers of having drugged and groped her during the early 1970s. The allegation resurfaced during the 2017 #MeToo movement. He issued a statement in November 2017 that claimed a different recollection of events than Midler's and apologized for the incident.

The 2017 Kendrick Lamar song "Yah" on his fourth studio album Damn mentions Rivera, who criticized Lamar's performance of "Alright" at the BET Awards 2015. The album's second track, "DNA" also features Rivera's negative comments about Lamar.

On September 22, 2018, Geraldo and WTAM (1100 AM) in Cleveland, Ohio announced that he would join the station to host a daily one-hour talk show, Geraldo in Cleveland, in addition to a weekly podcast on the parent iHeartRadio app, effective September 24. (Rivera resides in the Cleveland suburb of Shaker Heights.)

On March 13, 2020, during a segment of Fox & Friends discussing the coronavirus pandemic, Rivera stated, "If you can't hold your breath for 10 seconds. Everyone should do that. Hold your breath for 10 seconds. If you can hold your breath for 10 seconds then you don't have this disease." This false claim has been debunked by medical experts.

On July 22, 2020, Rivera called President Trump "brave" for wishing Ghislaine Maxwell "well", after a reporter questioned Trump over Maxwell's charges of helping Jeffrey Epstein traffic and abuse children. Rivera called the fact that Maxwell had been denied bail and given solitary confinement an example of "woke politics". Rivera had previously accused the judge who had denied bail to Maxwell of caving to the "mob".

On September 6, 2020, Fox News presented a one-hour special segment, "I Am Geraldo", on Rivera's 50-year television career, which began with accolades for such from President Trump.

On April 8, 2021, during a discussion on St. Louis mayor-elect Tishaura Jones, Rivera asked fellow contributor Leo Terrell, a black man, "when was the last time you were in the ghetto?" Terrell then became outraged, with the two escalating into a shouting match. Rivera later apologized to Terrell on Twitter, saying he "didn't mean it personally".

On December 14, 2021, Rivera called to account texts sent by Fox news anchors, including Sean Hannity to then-President Donald J. Trump asking for a forceful response to the January 6 attack on the U.S. Capitol Building. Imploring, "I beg you, Sean [Hannity], to remember the frame of mind you were in when you wrote that text on January 6th. And when Laura [Ingraham] did. And when Brian [Kilmeade] did. And when Don Jr. did. Remember that concern you had."

In January 2022, Rivera joined The Five as a rotating liberal co-host alongside Jessica Tarlov and Harold Ford Jr. He announced on June 21, 2023, that he would be departing the program on June 30 but remaining with the network. A week later Rivera announced that he had been fired from The Five hours before his scheduled June 29 appearance. As a result, he quit Fox News after 23 years, citing "growing tension that goes beyond editorial differences and personal annoyances and gripes."

=== NewsNation ===
In February 2024, NewsNation announced Rivera would join the network as a correspondent-at-large. This followed him appearing on the network as a guest repeatedly in the months prior to the announcement.

== Personal life ==
Rivera has been married five times:

1. Linda Coblentz (1965–1969, divorced)
2. Edith Vonnegut (December 14, 1971 – 1975, divorced)
3. Sherryl Raymond (December 31, 1976 – 1984, divorced)
  son: Gabriel Miguel (born July 1979)
4. C.C. (Cynthia Cruickshank) Dyer (July 11, 1987 – 2000, divorced)
  children: daughter Isabella Holmes (born 1992) daughter Simone Cruickshank (born 1994). Six other attempts at having children through IVF ended in miscarriage
5. Erica Michelle Levy (since August 10, 2003)
  daughter: Solita “Sol” (Segalit Liviah) Rivera (born August 2, 2005)

Rivera has admitted to having a multi-year affair with Marian Javits, wife of New York Senator Jacob Javits, until 1985.

In a 1991 interview with Barbara Walters, actress and singer Bette Midler accused Rivera of groping her. In a 2017 tweet, Midler renewed the accusation. Rivera later tweeted a response, saying he recalled the incident "much differently," and apologized, "in the very least, publicly embarrassing her all those years ago."

Rivera is currently a resident of Shaker Heights, Ohio. He previously resided in Middletown Township, New Jersey, at Rough Point, an 1895 shingle-style estate. After his fourth marriage ended, he moved from Middletown Township and became a longtime resident of the Edgewater Colony, a community located along the Hudson River in Edgewater, New Jersey.

Rivera is an active sailor. As owner and skipper of the sailing vessel Voyager, he participated in the Marion–Bermuda Cruising Yacht Race in 1985, 2005, 2011, and 2013. In 2013, his vessel finished in 12th place out of 34 finishers. He also sailed Voyager 1,400 miles up the Amazon river and around the world, going so far as to meet the King of Tonga on the international dateline in time for the new millennium. The adventures were chronicled in six one-hour-long specials on The Travel Channel, and some of this footage remains available on his website.

=== Politics ===
Rivera is a Republican. He has described himself as pro-choice, pro–gay marriage, and pro–immigration reform. Rivera supports some gun control. Following the Uvalde school shooting, he criticized the National Rifle Association (NRA) for saying that 18-year-olds should have the ability to purchase assault weapons, questioning why an 18-year-old is able to buy an assault weapon but not a beer.

In 2002, Rivera described himself as being a Zionist who would die for Israel. However, he also said that Palestinian suffering was turning him into a Palestinianist. Rivera has also frequently criticized Israeli treatment of Palestine. In 2017, Rivera criticized Israel for its military attacks on Gaza which killed civilians and babies. During the 2021 Israel–Palestine crisis, Rivera said it was "abhorrent" that Palestinian children died in bombings from Israel retaliating against Hamas. That same year Rivera criticized the United States for providing arms to Israel which it used to bomb the Gaza Strip and sided with Democratic congresswoman Rashida Tlaib in opposing the sale.

In the 2008 U.S. presidential election, Rivera supported Democratic candidate Barack Obama, while in the 2012 election he supported Republican Mitt Romney. Despite his friendship with Donald Trump, Rivera has nevertheless confirmed that he did not vote for the Republican candidate in the 2016 election because of "spousal influence". He had also previously said he would not vote for Trump because of comments made by the latter regarding Mexicans. He announced in 2024 that he would be voting for Kamala Harris in the 2024 U.S. presidential election due to his personal objections to the January 6 Capitol riots and his opposition to Trump's economic policies.

Rivera considered running as a Republican in the 2013 U.S. Senate special election in New Jersey to fill the Senate seat left vacant by the death of Frank Lautenberg. He eventually decided not to stand for election. Rivera also considered running in the 2022 U.S. Senate election in Ohio after incumbent Senator Rob Portman announced he would not seek re-election for his seat in the Senate. He eventually decided not to.

In the months preceding Russia's 2022 invasion of Ukraine, he criticized The New York Times for publishing an article that he claimed justified Russian President Vladimir Putin's desire to take the country while commending American President Joe Biden's "prudence" in bracing for the invasion without exacerbating tensions. After Fox News employees were killed in the invasion's early stages, Rivera condemned Putin as "the devil" and called the invasion "barbaric as it is unjustified". His views on the war brought him into conflict with those like his former Fox colleagues, such as a March 2022 argument with The Five co-host Jeanine Pirro when Rivera suggested Putin was "playing Trump" and calling Tucker Carlson "as full of shit about Ukraine as he was about January 6th." Rivera described a contentious 2025 meeting between Trump and Ukrainian President Volodymyr Zelenskyy as the former being "an ill-mannered bully insulting a war hero".

== Selected works ==
- Rivera, Geraldo (1972). Willowbrook: A report on how it is and why it doesn't have to be that way. New York: Vintage Books. ISBN 0-394-71844-5.
- Rivera, Geraldo (1973). Miguel Robles—So Far. San Diego: Harcourt Brace Jovanovich. ISBN 0-15-253900-X.
- Rivera, Geraldo (1973). Puerto Rico: Island of Contrasts, pictures by William Negron. Parents Magazine Press. ISBN 0-8193-0683-5.
- Rivera, Geraldo (1977). A Special Kind of Courage: Profiles of young Americans. New York: Bantam Books. ISBN 0-553-10501-9.
- Rivera, Geraldo (1992). Exposing Myself. London: Bantam. ISBN 0-553-29874-7.
- Rivera, Geraldo (2008). HisPanic: Why Americans fear Hispanics in the U. S. New York: Celebra. ISBN 978-0-451-22414-9.
- Rivera, Geraldo (2009). The Great Progression: How Hispanics Will Lead America to a New Era of Prosperity. New York: New American Library. ISBN 978-0-451-22881-9.
- Rivera, Geraldo (2018). The Geraldo Show, A Memoir. Texas: Benbella Books. ISBN 978-1-944648-90-9.

== See also ==
- List of Puerto Ricans
