= Ken Ramsauer =

American person with AIDS

Ken Ramsauer (December 26, 1954 – May 24, 1983) was an American businessperson. He was a hardware store manager and freelance lighting designer who became the first person with AIDS to be the subject of a national network television news special when he was interviewed by Geraldo Rivera on the 20/20 television program broadcast four days before his death in 1983. At the time little was known of AIDS, including its causation. A candlelight vigil was held in Central Park commemorating his life and death, opened by New York Mayor Ed Koch and attracting c. 1,500 people. The vigil was later covered in the book version of How to Survive a Plague. Around 600 individuals were known to have died from AIDS at the time of Ramsauer's death, and their names were read aloud at the vigil. The vigil was called "the first large gathering acknowledging the existence of the epidemic".

At the time of his death, the public was advised by authorities to avoid contact with individuals infected with HIV. Ramsauer recalled in the 20/20 interview how he was treated by hospital staff, whom he overheard asking "I wonder how long the faggot in 208 is going to last." Some sources have stated that Ramsauer was sought out by 20/20 producers for the shocking appearance of a man near death, seeking "the most debilitated people with AIDS they could find". Ramsauer's treatment by the press was "decisively deconstructed" in Bright Eyes, a documentary by writer and filmmaker Stuart Marshall describing "the pathology of fear and manipulation surrounding the AIDS crisis".
