= Baseball's Seasons =

- Genre: Documentary
- Narrated by: Curt Chaplin
- Country of origin: United States
- No. of seasons: 6
- No. of episodes: 32

Production
- Running time: 60 minutes, minus commercials
- Production company: Major League Baseball Productions

Original release
- Network: MLB Network
- Release: January 7, 2009 – December 30, 2013

Baseball's Seasons is an American television documentary series that was aired on MLB Network from January 7, 2009 until December 30, 2013. Each episode takes a look at a season in the history of Major League Baseball. The series is narrated by Curt Chaplin. Like a lot of the network's other original programming, Baseball's Seasons airs when the league is in offseason.

The series is currently available for streaming online on the streaming services Apple TV+ and Pluto TV.

== Episodes ==
Ep.	Date	Year	Title	Description
01	1/7/2009	1995	"Baseball Returns"	Baseball attempts to heal after the strike of 1994. Cal Ripken Jr. beats Gehrig's record. The Mariners save baseball in Seattle. The Braves meet the Indians in the World Series.
02	1/14/2009	1986	"Expect the Unexpected"	Future legends Greg Maddux, Will Clark, Barry Larkin, Barry Bonds, Bo Jackson, Fred McGriff, and Jamie Moyer debut. The Mets meet the Red Sox in the World Series.
03	1/21/2009	2001	"More Than a Game"	Baseball heals the nation in the wake of its greatest tragedy. The wounded city of New York finds one of its own teams in one of the most dramatic world series in history. Two legends and future hall-of-famers, Cal Ripken Jr. and Tony Gwynn retire. The Diamondbacks meet the Yankees in the World Series.
04	1/28/2009	1968	"The Year of the Pitcher"	In the year of the pitcher, Bob Gibson sets the ERA record, Denny McLain wins 31 games, and Mickey Lolich wins 3 games in the World Series. The Tigers meet the Cardinals in the World Series.
05	2/11/2009	1993	"Baseball at a Crossroads"	MLB expands for the first time in 16 years, bringing baseball to Florida and Colorado. In the last season of the two-division structure, the Braves and Giants battle through the summer. The Blue Jays and the Phillies meet in the World Series. Joe Carter's walk-off home run in Game 6 clinched the World Series for the Blue Jays.
06	2/18/2009	1982	"Anything Can Happen"	Baseball recovers from the strike-shortened season of '81. The Orioles and Brewers face off in a dramatic race for the American League East. The Cardinals meet the Brewers in the World Series.
07	3/31/2009	1961	"A New Era"	The Yankees' Mickey Mantle and Roger Maris contend for the single-season home run record. Teams come to Minnesota, Washington, D.C., and Los Angeles. The Yankees meet the Reds in the World Series.
08	11/18/2009	1979	"Family"	Willie Stargell leads the Pittsburgh Pirates, spurned on by the motto "We Are Family". The Pirates meet the Orioles in the World Series.
09	11/25/2009	1969	"Amazin'"	The Miracle Mets go from perennial cellar-dwellers to top of the National League. The majors add teams to Seattle, Kansas City, San Diego, and Montreal, the first Canadian baseball team. They also realign into East and West, and the League Championship Series is born. The Mets meet the Orioles in the World Series.
10	1/6/2010	1959	"Something to Prove"	A year after the big move to LA and a second-to-last place finish, the Los Angeles Dodgers try to return to prominence. Meanwhile, in the American League, the Chicago White Sox wish to finally overcome the untouchable Yankees. The Dodgers meet the White Sox in the World Series.
11	1/13/2010	1967	"The Impossible Dream"	The baseball season is played amongst the backdrop of social unrest. While the Summer of Love begins in San Francisco, the Detroit Tigers deal with a summer of racial conflict. The Boston Red Sox try to make their impossible dream come alive. The Cardinals meet the Red Sox in the World Series.
12	2/10/2010	2004	"Finally"	The St. Louis Cardinals make a run for the title with the help of sluggers Larry Walker and Albert Pujols. The Minnesota Twins see the rise of ace pitcher Johan Santana. The Boston Red Sox attempt to shake off the memories of their defeat the previous year at the hands of the Aaron Boone and the New York Yankees. They get their chance when the two get a rematch, resulting in the greatest comeback in the history of the game. The Red Sox meet the Cardinals in the World Series.
13	2/17/2010	2003	"A Wild Ride"	The Florida Marlins try to recapture the glory of their championship season, becoming one of the eight teams in the National League contending for the wild card. The rivalry between the New York Yankees and the Boston Red Sox heats up after the Yankees win the fight for Cuban defector José Contreras. The two teams get a chance to duke it out on the field when they meet in the ALCS. Meanwhile, in the NLCS, the Chicago Cubs try to triumph against their past and win a pennant. The Marlins meet the Yankees in the World Series.
14	2/17/2010	1987	"What a Blast!"	The Minnesota Twins win their second AL pennant since the move to Minnesota. The first World Series to be played indoors introduced the St. Louis Cardinals to the dome field advantage. The Twins meet the Cardinals in the World Series.
15	11/15/2010	1990	"Anything Can Happen"	An old rivalry is reborn in the NLCS between the Pirates and the Reds. The A's continue their dominance. An NL batting champion is crowned while playing in the AL. The Athletics meet the Reds in the World Series.
16	11/29/2010	1971	"Greatness in the Game"	Vida Blue and Joe Torre win league MVP awards. The All Star Game features 20 future hall of famers. The Orioles meet the Pirates in the World Series.
17	12/13/2010	1985	"Diamond Royalty"	Dwight "Doctor K" Gooden provides the greatest Cy Young performance since Bob Gibson. Don Denkinger blows a legendary call in the "I-70" World Series. The Royals meet the Cardinals in the World Series.
18	12/20/2010	1975	"Agents of Change"	The New York Yankees land Catfish Hunter in a landmark signing, and start the wheels for the inception of baseball free agency. The Big Red Machine try to make the move from bridesmaid to bride. The Boston Red Sox rise from the middle of the AL East and take on the defending threepeat champions, the Oakland Athletics. The Reds meet the Red Sox in the World Series.
19	7/3/2011	2000	"Subway Series Renewed"	The Yankees meet the Mets in the World Series for the first Subway Series in 44 years. Also featuring the Mariners, A's, White Sox, Cardinals, Giants and Reds.
20	11/12/2011	1965	"Pitcher Perfect"	Sandy Koufax and Don Drysdale lead the Dodgers to the World Series facing Tony Oliva, Mudcat Grant and Zoilo Versalles of the Minnesota Twins. The Dodgers defeat the Twins in a classic 7-game series. In the season leading up the World Series, Koufax tosses a perfect game on September 9 — a 1–0 victory over the Cubs.
21	11/19/2011	1977	"Turmoil & Triumph"	The Yankees acquire Reggie Jackson by free agency by signing him to a 5-year deal. The American League adds two new teams in Seattle and Toronto. Meanwhile, the 2-time defending world champion Reds are unseated when the Dodgers win the NL West. The Phillies lose Game 4 of the NLCS to the Dodgers. The ALCS is just as dramatic, with the series going to what was then a full 5 games. The Yankees wind up beating the Dodgers in 6 games for their 21st World Series championship behind the famous three-home run game from Reggie Jackson.
22	12/3/2011	1978	"Familiar Foes"	The Yankees battle their archrival Red Sox for the AL East title. The race comes down to a memorable one game playoff famous for the Bucky Dent home run that gives the Yankees a lead they don't relinquish. They use that momentum to take down the Royals and Dodgers for a second straight year, and another championship. The NLCS also produces the same result, with the Dodgers beating the Phillies in 4 games.
23	12/10/2011	1980	"Hot Corner Champions"	George Brett, Mike Schmidt, J. R. Richard, Steve Stone and Steve Howe lead their teams through tight divisional races. The Yankees win 103 games, fending off the Orioles who win 100. The Astros and Dodgers battle for the NL West, with the race coming down to a one game playoff. The Astros prevail, beating the Dodgers 7–1. After three losses in the NLCS from 1976–1978, the Phillies reach the World Series after a tight 5-game match with the Astros with the final four games being decided in extra innings. The Royals also capture their first pennant, sweeping the Yankees in the ALCS culminated by George Brett's 3-run home run in Game 3. After over eight decades of disappointment, the Philles win their first World Series. They defeat the Royals in 6 games.
24	12/17/2011	1974	"715"	Hank Aaron breaks Babe Ruth's all-time home run record. The A's dynasty continues as they roll through the AL en route to a World Series matchup with the Dodgers.
25	11/11/2012	1997	"Something Wild"	Interleague play is introduced for the first time as part of the regular season. Ken Griffey Jr. wins the AL MVP, hitting 56 home runs. The Florida Marlins become the first wild card team to win a World Series, defeating the Cleveland Indians in Game 7 on a walk-off bases-loaded single by Édgar Rentería.
26	11/18/2012	1984	"Year of the Tiger"	The powerhouse Detroit Tigers dominate the American League with a historic 35-5 start, while the upstart Padres claim their first pennant after a thrilling series with the Chicago Cubs. Detroit wins their first championship since 1968 when they beat San Diego in five games.
27	12/2/2012	2005	"Second City Surprise"	The Astros bounce back from a 15–30 start to win the wild card and eventually their first pennant. The White Sox win their first championship in 88 years, sweeping the Astros in four games.
28	12/10/2012	1981	"A Season Interrupted"	The season is shortened by a strike, neccating the first ever Division Series in the playoffs. The Los Angeles Dodgers become the first team to come back from the 2 games to none deficit to beat the Houston Astros in the NLDS. They go on to beat the Montreal Expos in the NLCS on a famous home run by Rick Monday. Los Angeles goes on the avenge losses to the Yankees in 1977 and 1978 by beating them in six games to take the World Series.
29	12/17/2012	1970	"The Birds Soar"	The Cincinnati Reds become a force in the National League under Sparky Anderson. They reach their first World Series in 9 years, but are brought down in 5 games by the Baltimore Orioles in the World Series who themselves avenge a loss to the New York Mets a year earlier.
30	12/16/2013	1983	"Charm City"	After a season of record-breaking chases and historic milestones, AL MVP Cal Ripken Jr. and his Orioles emerge as World Champs against the Wheeze Kids from Philadelphia.
31	12/23/2013	1988	"Hollywood Ending"	Orel Hershiser's dominant run, the first 40-40 season in history, and an iconic World Series home run that could only happen in Hollywood.
32	12/30/2013	1989	"Seismic Changes"	A season made memorable by the debut of Ken Griffey Jr. and an historic All-Star performance by Bo Jackson turns unforgettable as the World Series is interrupted by a devastating earthquake.
