= Judge Wapner's Animal Court =

- Directed by: Martin Pasetta
- Starring: Joseph Wapner

Production
- Executive producer: Cindy Frei
- Producers: Kimberly Austin; Carl Peoples; Sandi Spreckman

Original release
- Network: Animal Planet
- Release: September 28, 1998 – 2000

Related
- The People's Court

Judge Wapner's Animal Court is a court show and spin-off of The People's Court. The program is presided over by Judge Joseph Wapner (better known for his tenure as the original judge of The People's Court). On Judge Wapner's Animal Court, he was accompanied by his bailiff Rusty Burrell—also a People's Court carryover—while hearing and ruling on real cases involving or about animals. The courtroom series was shown on Animal Planet for two seasons from 1998 to 2000.
