= The Mystery of Al Capone's Vaults =

1986 television special

- Title screen
- Genre: Reality
- Directed by: Bill Foster
- Starring: Geraldo Rivera; Buddy Rogers; Robert St. John

Production
- Producers: John Joslyn; Doug Llewelyn
- Running time: 120 minutes

Original release
- Release: April 21, 1986

The Mystery of Al Capone's Vaults is a two-hour American television special that was broadcast live in syndication on April 21, 1986, hosted by Geraldo Rivera. It centered on the opening of a walled-off underground room in the Lexington Hotel in Chicago once owned by the crime lord Al Capone. The room contained only debris. Thirty million people watched, making The Mystery of Al Capone's Vaults the highest-rated syndicated special in history.

== Background ==
In July 1928, Al Capone, the head of the Chicago Outfit organized crime syndicate, moved his headquarters from Metropole Hotel in Chicago to the nearby Lexington Hotel. Capone ran his various enterprises from this hotel until his arrest in 1931. He died in 1947.

In the 1980s, while surveying the hotel for reconstruction, a construction company discovered a number of walled-off subterranean chambers. The television producers John Joslyn and Doug Llewelyn, who had formed the Westgate Group production company, proposed a live broadcast of the opening of the chambers, fearing its contents would be leaked to the public if the opening were taped in advance.

As major television networks were unwilling to produce the broadcast without a guaranteed outcome, Joslyn and Llewelyn partnered with Tribune Entertainment, which financed the production for $900,000. Preproduction took four months. The host, Geraldo Rivera, had recently been fired from his high-profile position at ABC News following a public dispute with the executive Roone Arledge, and saw the broadcast as an opportunity for a media comeback.

== Broadcast ==
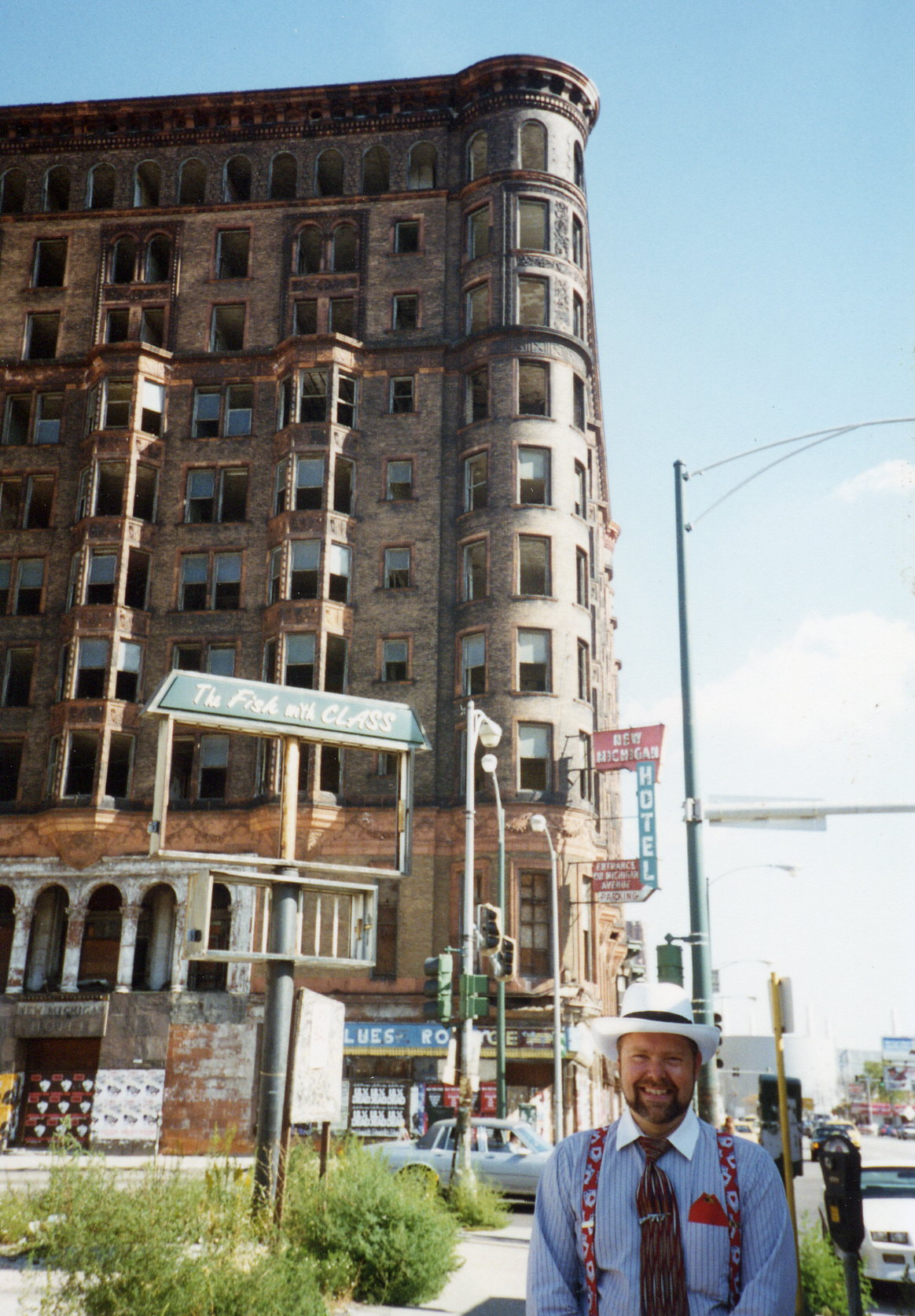
The dilapidated Lexington Hotel

The Mystery of Al Capone's Vaults was broadcast live on April 21, 1986. It was two hours long, including commercials. It was highly anticipated for its potential to reveal great riches or dead bodies on live television. Present were a medical examiner, should bodies be found, and agents from the Internal Revenue Service to collect any of Capone's money. Most of the show comprised a documentary about gangsters and the prohibition era.

When the vault was opened, it contained only dirt and empty bottles, including one Rivera claimed was for moonshine bathtub gin. After several attempts to dig further into the vault, Rivera admitted defeat and voiced his disappointment to the viewers, apologizing as he thanked the excavation team for their efforts. After the show, Rivera was quoted as saying "seems like we struck out".

Geraldo said on the April 20, 2016, edition of the Fox News Channel program The Five that he went right across the street and got "tequila drunk" after the special aired, then went back to his hotel room and put the "do not disturb" sign on the door. In his 1991 autobiography Exposing Myself, he wrote: "My career was not over, I knew, but had just begun. And all because of a silly, high-concept stunt that failed to deliver on its titillating promise."

== Reception ==
The Mystery of Al Capone's Vault was the most-watched syndicated television special of 1986, with an estimated audience of 30 million. This makes it the highest-rated syndicated special in history. At the time of broadcast, it drew mockery, and the New York Daily News accused it of glamorizing Capone. However, Tribune Entertainment was pleased with the high ratings, which outperformed major shows such as The Cosby Show and Family Ties. The show drew high ratings even when it was broadcast later on the west coast after news had spread. In 2023, Rolling Stone listed the special as one of the worst decisions in television history, saying "it remains one of the most famous non-events in TV history".

Retrospective analysis has framed the broadcast as a success for its high ratings and helping build Rivera's career as an "affable ringmaster for crazy televised stunts". The A.V. Club wrote that the special was "slick" and that Rivera was a "charismatic performer who commands the small screen with blustery confidence ... When he can't deliver the goods, he plays it off with a winningly apologetic smile".

== Similar events ==
In 1984, a safe recovered from the shipwreck SS Andrea Doria was opened. During the broadcast, all that was revealed were a few silver certificates floating at the top of the waterlogged safe. Peter Gimbel, who recovered the safe and arranged the TV event, said the media "felt ripped off because there wasn't a treasure". On October 28, 1987, the actor Telly Savalas hosted Return to the Titanic Live, a two-hour television special broadcast from Paris. The special was also produced by John Joslyn, who also produced The Mystery of Al Capone's Vaults.

In January 2019, the Australian Broadcasting Corporation reporter Matt Garrick broke the news of a locked secret room in the former reserve bank building in Darwin, Northern Territory. Garrick speculated as to the room's contents, including possible "piles of gold bullion" or "explosive dossiers" from the building's time housing United Nations officials. However, another prediction of "cobwebbed shelving and a scattering of dead cockroaches" proved more accurate, along with "bureaucratic loan records" revealing a former security guard had allegedly failed to return a stamp book in 1986.

== See also ==
- Clickbait
- Eaten Alive (TV program)
- List of television shows notable for negative reception
