= The People's Court =

American reality court show (1981–2023)

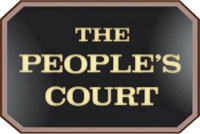
- Genre: Arbitration-based reality court show
- Based on: an idea by John Masterson
- Presented by: Doug Llewelyn; Curt Chaplin; Carol Martin; Harvey Levin
- Narrated by: Jack Harrell; Curt Chaplin
- Theme music composer: Alan Tew
- Opening theme: "The Big One"
- Country of origin: United States
- Original language: English
- No. of seasons: 38 (12 original, 26 revival)

Production
- Executive producers: Ralph Edwards; Stu Billett
- Production locations: Los Angeles, California, U.S. (1981–93); New York City, U.S. (1997–2012); Stamford, Connecticut, U.S. (2012–23)
- Camera setup: Multi-camera
- Running time: 30 minutes (1981–93); 60 minutes (1997–2023)
- Production companies: Ralph Edwards Productions (1981–86) (1987–93) (copyright only); Stu Billett Productions (1981–86); Ralph Edwards/Stu Billett Productions (1986–93; 1997–2023); Warner Bros. Television

Original release
- Network: Syndication
- Release: September 14, 1981 – May 28, 1993
- Release: September 8, 1997 – July 21, 2023

Related
- Judge Wapner's Animal Court

The People's Court is an American arbitration-based reality court show, featuring an arbitrator handling small claims disputes in a simulated courtroom set. Within the court show genre, it is the first of all arbitration-based reality-style programs, which has overwhelmingly become the convention of the genre. The original series ran from 1981 to 1993, and the revival ran from 1997 to 2023. Both versions ran in first-run syndication. The show ranks as the longest-running traditional court show and second-longest-running court show in general, having a total of 38 overall seasons as of the 2022–23 television year, behind only niche court show Divorce Court by 2 seasons.

The first version of The People's Court was presided over solely by former Los Angeles County Superior Court Judge Joseph Wapner. The final incarnation of the show had different presiding judges: former New York City Mayor Ed Koch (1997–99), former New York Supreme Court Judge Jerry Sheindlin (1999–2001), and former Florida State Circuit Court Judge Marilyn Milian (2001–23). Milian is the show's longest-reigning arbiter, presiding over the series for 22 years.

The program is the third highest rated of court shows after only Judge Judy reruns (ended the original run in July 2021) and Hot Bench (produced by Judy Sheindlin). With Judge Judy's end at 25 seasons in 2021, The People's Court's revival now boasts the genre's longest single production continuance having entered its 26th season in the 2022–23 television year (albeit having gone through 3 arbitrators). On June 16, 2023, The People's Court won its 5th Daytime Emmy Award for Outstanding Legal/Courtroom Program, which officially gives it the most Daytime Emmy wins in the court show genre. In February 2023, it was confirmed that the 26th season of the revival would be its last. The final episode aired on July 21, 2023.

== Conception ==
When John Masterson devised the original camera-in-court concept in 1975, he first pitched it to Monty Hall, the producer and host of the game show Let's Make a Deal, and his partner, producer-writer Stefan Hatos. They put a young associate, Stu Billett, in charge of selling it, but the networks were not interested. Billett later went out on his own and refined the concept into a show shot in a studio rather than a real courtroom. Small-claims court participants agreed to drop their court cases and accept binding arbitration in a simulated courtroom. The networks expressed interest, but still did not buy it; however, it did sell into the first-run syndication market. The series was executive produced by Ralph Edwards, who also created and hosted the documentary show This Is Your Life, and Stu Billett, who later went on to create Moral Court. John Masterson, whom many consider a pioneer and originator of "reality TV" also created Bride and Groom and Queen for a Day.

The People's Court is the first court show to use binding arbitration, introducing the format into the genre in 1981. The system has been duplicated by most of the show's successors in the judicial genre. Moreover, The People's Court is the first popular, long-running reality in the judicial genre. It was preceded only by a few short-lived realities in the genre; these short-lived predecessors were only loosely related to judicial proceedings, except for one: Parole (1959) took footage from real-life courtrooms holding legal proceedings. Before The People's Court, the vast majority of TV courtroom shows used actors, and recreated or fictional cases (as did radio before that). Examples of these types of court shows include Famous Jury Trials and Your Witness.

The People's Court has had two incarnations. The show's first life was presided over solely by former Los Angeles County Superior Court Judge Joseph Wapner. His tenure lasted from the show's debut on September 14, 1981, until May 28, 1993, when the show was canceled due to falling ratings. This left the show with a total of 2,484 half-hour episodes and 12 seasons. The show was taped in Los Angeles during its first life. After being canceled, reruns aired in syndication until September 9, 1994, and on the USA Network from October 16, 1995, to June 6, 1997.

On September 8, 1997, after being out of production for four years, The People's Court was revived in first-run syndication as a 60-minute program. Former lawyer and Mayor of New York Ed Koch was chosen as arbiter, which he maintained for two seasons. By the 1999–2000 season, former New York State Supreme Court Judge Jerry Sheindlin (husband of Judy Sheindlin from Judge Judy and Judy Justice) succeeded Koch. Sheindlin only lasted one and a half seasons and was replaced towards the end of the 2000–01 season. For the remainder of the revival's run, Marilyn Milian was the judge.

== Original version (1981–93) ==
The People's Court pilot episode was taped on October 23, 1980, with a second pilot episode taped on January 13, 1981. The show debuted as a half-hour program on September 14, 1981. The judge from the show's first 12 seasons (including the 1980 pilot) was Joseph Wapner. Rusty Burrell (who was a close friend of Wapner) was his bailiff, Jack Harrell was the announcer, and Doug Llewelyn was the host and court reporter, who announced the matter of the dispute at the beginning of each trial. He also interviewed the plaintiff and the defendant after the court ruling, to gauge their responses to the verdict. Llewelyn often ended each episode with a jaunty "If you're in a dispute with another party and you can't seem to work things out, don't take the law into your own hands; you take 'em to court," which became something of a 1980s catchphrase. If a case ended with a verdict for the defendant, however, Llewelyn instead ended the episode by saying, "If someone files a lawsuit against you and yet you're convinced you've done nothing wrong, don't be intimidated. The best policy is to go to court and stand up for your rights." The cases often had pun-related names, such as "The Overdone Underthings" and "A Head with a Beer on It". Judge Wapner greeted his litigants by saying, "I know each of you has been sworn. I've read your complaint..." Occasionally, if an episode wrapped up a few minutes early, Judge Wapner fielded questions from the courtroom observers, or legal consultant Harvey Levin explained the legal reasons behind Wapner's decisions.

The People's Court dealt in small-claims matters. When the show debuted as a half-hour program in 1981, litigants could not sue for more than US$1,500, which was the limit for small-claims court at the time in California. As the laws in California changed, so did this amount: in 1988, the small claims limit in California was raised to US$2,500, and raised again in 1990 to US$5,000. Researchers for the show examined small-claims filings in Southern California and approached the plaintiff and defendant in interesting cases. The producers offered to have Judge Wapner arbitrate the dispute if they would agree to dismiss their action and be bound by Judge Wapner's decision. Through this approach, the show could get real people with real cases. Though the show is decorated and runs like a real courtroom, it is not a real court or part of any judicial system, but instead a form of binding arbitration.

The losing party does not need to pay the judgment, as such. Instead (as is stated in the disclaimer at the end of each show), both parties are paid from a fund (set up by Ralph Edwards-Stu Billett Productions). This fund was based on the amount of the lawsuit claim, but an exact formula was not stated. The fund was to be first divided equally, then any monetary judgment ordered was subtracted from the loser's half (and presumably both halves in the case of cross judgments). Each litigant received at least what remained of their half in shows concluding with that disclaimer. The disclaimer did not call this fund an "appearance fee", a term which appeared later in connection with The People's Court and other court shows. There may have been a later period when The People's Court paid the judgment, plus expenses and only a modest appearance fee to each litigant.

=== Cancellation ===
In 1993, after 12 seasons on The People's Court, Wapner was not invited back to the show. The show's producers wished to revamp the series, but they did not notify him of that decision, which he eventually learned of from his brother-in-law, who read about it in the San Francisco Chronicle. Wapner expressed holding great resentment and bitterness at the show's producers for his finding out this way, and additional resentment over being let go when, according to him, the show was still doing well. However, although the show had a good run ratings-wise, the ratings had dropped to an all-time low at around the time The People's Court was canceled.

Wapner stated that he was told years later that the producers did not want to hurt his feelings, but that it was exactly what they did. He also stated that he was not notified when the producers decided to revamp the series and that he held no opinions on The People's Court judges who succeeded him as he never watched the program. He did, however, note that the two People's Court judges who succeeded him, Ed Koch and Jerry Sheindlin, only lasted no more than two seasons each, whereas he lasted the original series' entire 12 seasons. He also emphasized that judges need to be respectful of litigants. In 2009, he returned to The People's Court during the Marilyn Milian era to preside over a case in honor of his 90th birthday.

== Revival (1997–2023) ==
After the O. J. Simpson murder trial revived interest in court shows, and Judge Judy became very successful, on September 8, 1997, a revival of The People's Court debuted in first-run syndication. The series as a whole reached its 38th season in September 2022, with its 26th and final season in its production cycle. The 1997–2023 reincarnation has vastly outlasted the program's original version, which ran 12 seasons. The show's second incarnation was headed by three judges in all.

The new The People's Court expanded from the original version's 30-minute length to a 60-minute broadcast where former New York Newscaster Carol Martin (1997–98) of WCBS-TV hosted from a studio. Harvey Levin (1997–2023) was also added to the show cast in a role that was added to reflect the court show's title People's Court: returning from breaks, Levin acting as a field reporter, is shown at an external public place taking questions and opinions from people about the case, and then, returning to the studio at the end of the show for a wrap-up. Curt Chaplin (1997–2023) replaced Jack Harrell as the show's announcer and appeared on camera as the court reporter with the addition of a litigant-final-thoughts interviewer, known for snippily interviewing the program's litigants following the conclusion of each case. Beginning with the 2016–17 season, Doug Llewelyn from the first incarnation of The People's Court took over this litigant interviewing role. Chaplin, however, maintained his voice-over role in the series. In this role, Chaplin narrated the court show in a manner that poked fun at the cases with melodramatic and exaggerated vocal expressions and verbiage.

=== Ed Koch era (1997–99) ===
Former New York City Mayor Ed Koch presided over the court from September 8, 1997, to June 25, 1999, with reruns airing until September 10. In 1998, Carol Martin left the show, with Levin becoming the sole host. The studio segments were done away with and Levin hosted the entire episodes from the viewing area, which eventually moved from the Manhattan Mall to the Times Square visitors' center. Since Levin is now based in Los Angeles with TMZ, the viewing area has moved to the Third Street Promenade in Santa Monica, California, while production of The People's Court has moved to Connecticut. The opening outlines of the taped cases are shown to people in the outdoor viewing area on a monitor. Their responses are edited into the program.

=== Judge Jerry Sheindlin era (1999–March 2001) ===
Judge Jerry Sheindlin (husband of Judge Judy Sheindlin, the presiding judge over Judge Judy) sat on the bench from September 13, 1999, to March 9, 2001, and ratings on the show lagged. The bailiff for both of these judges' tenures was Josephine Ann Longobardi. Sheindlin was on occasion referred to as "Judge Judy's husband" by some litigants.

=== Judge Marilyn Milian era (2001–23) ===
On March 12, 2001, late in The People's Court's fourth season, retired Florida State Circuit Court Judge Marilyn Milian replaced Sheindlin as presiding judge on the court show. Under Milian, People's Court ratings improved. Milian is the first Hispanic judge to preside over a courtroom series. By the completion of the 16th season of The People's Court (2012–13), Milian had completed 12 1/2 seasons presiding over the series, officially making her the longest reigning judge over the program—outlasting Joseph Wapner's reign of 12 seasons. For the remainder of the 2000–01 season, Davey Jones took over the role of bailiff, replacing Longobardi. In September 2001, Jones was replaced by Douglas McIntosh, who remained on the show until its cancellation in July 2023.

In 2008, The People's Court, under Milian's reign, was nominated for a Daytime Emmy Award under a new Courtroom/Legal Show category created by the Academy of Television Arts & Sciences. In 2009 and 2010, the show was nominated again for the Daytime Emmy Award under the same category but did not win. On May 1, 2013, The People's Court had again been nominated for an Outstanding Legal/Courtroom Program Daytime Emmy, but again did not win.

The show was taped in Manhattan for the first 15 seasons of the revival; beginning with the 16th season (2012–13), it was taped in Stamford, Connecticut.

For the show's 20th season, Doug Llewelyn returned to the series for the first time since the end of the original series. He resumed his previous role as host/reporter, replacing Curt Chaplin, who remained in the announcer role as of March 2017. For Llewelyn's first show back, Judge Milian welcomed him "home" and handed him his suit jacket and microphone.

=== Cancellation ===
On February 17, 2023, it was announced that The People's Court revival would end after 26 seasons. Variety reported that the cancelation was due to a broader decline in advertising revenue for syndicated daytime shows, leading television stations to prioritize spending money on local news, rather than acquiring other programming.

This also ends a 26-year relationship with Harvey Levin and Telepictures which sold TMZ to Fox Corporation in 2021 while continuing the final two years doing The People's Court.

In April 2023, it was reported that Allen Media Group had signed Milian to a new show, Justice for the People with Judge Milian, set to premiere in syndication in fall 2023.

== Series overview ==
=== Opening disclaimer ===
When The People's Court premiered on September 14, 1981, as a half-hour show, the first opening disclaimer was used during the first five seasons of the Wapner run, and was narrated by Jack Harrell:

What you are about to witness is real. The participants are not actors. They are the actual people who have already either filed suit or been served a summons to appear in a California Municipal Court. Both parties in the suit have agreed to dismiss their court cases, and have their disputes settled here...in our forum...The People's Court.

Beginning in Season 6 (1986–87) and running until the end of the Wapner run in 1993, the opening disclaimer by Jack Harrell was changed:

What you are witnessing is real. The participants are not actors. They are actual litigants with a case pending in a California Municipal Court. Both parties have agreed to dismiss their court cases, and have their disputes settled here...in our forum...The People's Court.

On September 8, 1997, when The People's Court expanded from 30 minutes to 60 minutes, where former New York mayor Ed Koch became the judge, the show moved to New York City, and the opening disclaimer was changed and was narrated by Curt Chaplin:

What you are witnessing is real. The participants are not actors. They are actual litigants with a case pending in a New York Metropolitan Area Court. Both parties have agreed to drop their claims, and have their dispute settled here...in our forum...The People's Court.

On September 13, 1999, when Jerry Sheindlin replaced Ed Koch as the judge, the opening disclaimer by Curt Chaplin was changed:

What you are witnessing is real. The participants are not actors. They are actual litigants with a case pending in civil court. Both sides have agreed to settle their dispute here in Judge Jerry Sheindlin's forum...The People's Court.

When Marilyn Milian replaced Jerry Sheindlin as the final judge on March 12, 2001, the opening disclaimer was changed:

What you are witnessing is real. The participants are not actors. They are actual litigants with real cases. They will settle their disputes here...in Judge Marilyn Milian's forum...The People's Court.

Later, Milian's opening disclaimer was changed:

There's a new judge in town, the honorable Marilyn Milian. She will be hearing real cases presented by real litigants who have agreed to have their disputes settled here...in our forum...The People's Court.

Then, a couple of years later, Milian's opening disclaimer changed again:

The whole country's talking about the honorable Marilyn Milian... [soundbite of Judge Marilyn Milian saying, "Judge here!"]... the hottest judge on television. [Soundbite of Judge Marilyn Milian saying, "It's my ruling!"] She'll hear real cases from real litigants. Here...in our forum...The People's Court.

After a few months, the soundbites of Judge Milian's voice were removed from the opening, and Curt Chaplin's opening disclaimer was slightly changed:

Everybody's talking about the honorable Marilyn Milian, the hottest judge on television. Real cases, real litigants. Here...in our forum...The People's Court.

In September 2009, the final opening disclaimer was used:

What you are about to witness is real. The participants are not actors. They are actual litigants with a case pending in civil court. Both parties have agreed to drop their claims, and have their cases settled here, before Judge Marilyn Milian...in our forum...The People's Court.

=== Litigant compensation ===
At the end of each show, the following disclaimer appeared:

Both the plaintiff and the defendant have been paid from a fund for their appearance. The amount, if any, awarded in the case, is deducted from this fund, and the remainder is divided equally between both litigants. The amount of the fund is dependent on the size of the judgment.

No information is given as to what relation the amount of the fund bears to the size of the judgment, nor the amount of the fund if a verdict for the defense is rendered.

In a talk-show appearance, Judge Wapner gave a few more specifics as to how compensation was typically calculated. In his words, if the plaintiff won, the show would pay his/her judgment and give the defendant $50 for his/her time, whereas if the defendant won, the parties would "split $500".

In 1989, a litigant sued the producers, claiming, "I was only willing to appear because they guaranteed me $1,500. I never would have appeared on that show and made a fool out of myself for a chintzy $250." (In response, an associate producer said that before going on the show, participants are given a packet of information "where everything is clearly outlined to the nth degree.")

The New York Post reported on some of the details surrounding compensation for a lawsuit filed by Claudia Evart. "The show pays all damages awarded to defendants and plaintiffs, as well as a $250 appearance fee."

== Production notes ==
The 1981–93 life of the show was initially taped at Golden West Broadcasters and, later, Metromedia Square in Los Angeles, before moving to The Production Group. In New York City, The People's Court first taped episodes at the NEP/Image studios in the former Grand Ballroom of the Hotel Pennsylvania, which was also the studio for the talk show Maury. In 1998, the show began taping at the MTI Studios on the 8th floor at 401 Fifth Avenue, where the courtroom received a makeover. In 2006, the MTI Studios were sold to NEP/Image. At the end credits of some episodes, the show is said to be taped at the NEP/Image studios. The former MTI studios are officially part of NEP Broadcasting's NEP Penn Studios.

In 2012, the show moved to the Connecticut Film Center in Stamford, taking advantage of the same state tax credits which attracted NBCUniversal's syndication and cable divisions to the Stamford area. The aired episodes are sometimes spliced together in a different order from which they are taped (a common procedure on some hour-long shows). This is why the judge's blouse color may change and why fewer courtroom observers may be seen during the second half of the show than during the first half. For the 2012 season, the show started broadcasting in widescreen standard definition, before eventually converting to high-definition broadcast shortly thereafter.

All versions of The People's Court are "A Ralph Edwards-Stu Billett Production" in association with Telepictures Productions and distributed by Warner Bros. Domestic Television Distribution (including its predecessors Telepictures and later Lorimar-Telepictures), all of which are now part of Warner Bros. Discovery.

Since June 2020, cases have been posted on the official The People's Court YouTube channel. The channel has over 500,000 subscribers and has amassed 600 million views. Both current and old cases are posted.

=== Theme music ===
The theme music, "The Big One", was composed by Alan Stanley Tew and was originally a "library theme"—or stock music background track—composed for UK television in the 1970s. The uptempo theme music, with a prominent piano theme and bongo drum rhythm, has been sampled by many artists, including Nelly. It has also been featured in several films and television shows, including the 1977 pornographic film Barbara Broadcast, the 1979 low-budget film Malibu High, the BCTV current affairs program Webster!, SpongeBob SquarePants, The Loud House, "Blue Harvest", the sixth-season premiere episode of Family Guy, the December 5, 2005, and December 21, 2009, editions of WWE Raw in Tampa, Florida, Boy Meets World, and Popular.

=== 2020 COVID-19 production adjustments ===
When The People's Court resumed production for the 2020–21 season, there were several protocols put in place due to the COVID-19 pandemic in the United States earlier in the year. The studio was still set up as normal, but no spectators were allowed inside. The two litigants for each case also did not appear in court, nor did Judge Milian. Instead, the trial was conducted remotely with monitors placed behind the plaintiff's and defendant's stands and behind the bench. Bailiff Douglas McIntosh was present in the courtroom area to swear in the litigants, while Doug Llewelyn still conducted the post-case interviews while stationed in the corridor. Harvey Levin continued to offer commentary, doing so from his office at TMZ headquarters in Los Angeles. After each case, in a segment called "After the Verdict," Judge Milian discussed her verdict in chambers with her husband, John Schlesinger, a former assistant United States attorney, who in 2004 was elected to the 11th Judicial Circuit Court for Miami-Dade County.

For the 2021–22 season, Judge Milian returned to the studio with the plaintiffs and defendants still appearing remotely.

For the start of the 2022 season, only reruns were served for the first month and a half. New episodes began to air on October 17 with all parties returning to the studio.

== British version ==
A British version of the show was produced by STV Studios (then known as "SMG TV Productions") to replace Trisha Goddard's talk show on ITV from April 18 to May 27, 2005. Jerome Lynch and Rhonda Anderson served as judges, with Carol Smillie as the court reporter.
