= Marilyn Milian =

American judge and television personality

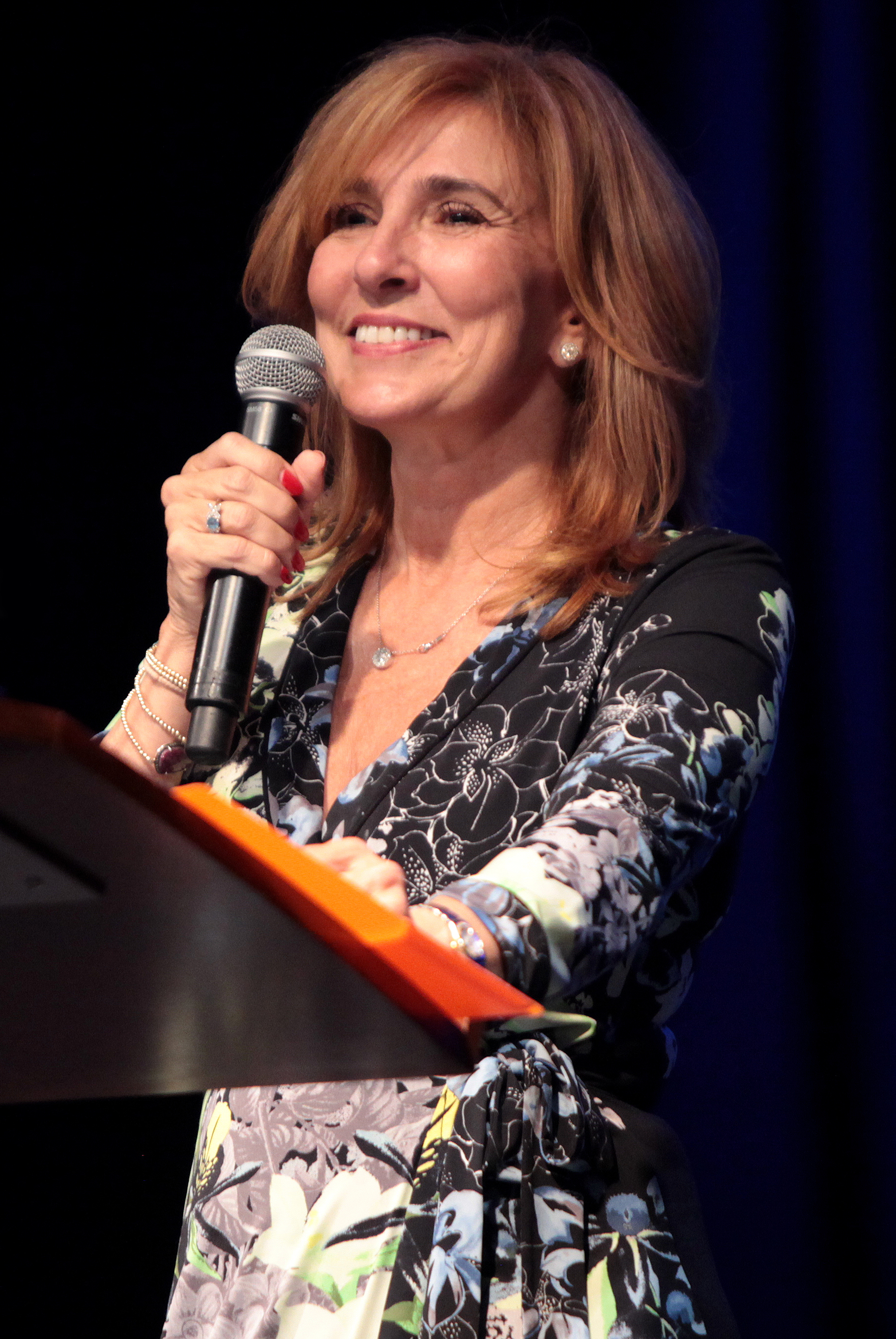
- Milian in 2017
- Born: May 1, 1961 (age 65); New York City, U.S.
- Education: University of Miami (BS); Georgetown University (JD)
- Occupations: Lecturer; television personality
- Years active: 1989–present
- Employer(s): Harvard Law School (1989–1990); University of Miami (adjunct faculty)
- Known for: The People's Court (2001–2023); Justice for the People with Judge Milian (2023–present)
- Office: Circuit Court Judge of Florida's 11th Judicial Circuit
- Spouse: John Schlesinger
- Children: 3

Marilyn Milian (born May 1, 1961), known professionally as Judge Milian, is an American television personality, lecturer, retired Florida Circuit Court judge and court-show arbitrator. She currently presides over Justice for the People with Judge Milian, which began in 2023 following the cancellation of The People's Court, over which she had presided since 2001.

Milian is the first Hispanic arbitrator to preside over a court show and during The People's Court's 2001–2023 season she became the show's longest-serving judge, surpassing Joseph Wapner, the show's inaugural jurist. She is also the most decorated TV judge, with 16 Daytime Emmy nominations and five wins in the Outstanding Legal/Courtroom Program for The People's Court.

== Early life ==
Milian was born in Manhattan to Cuban parents Jorge, a general contractor, and Georgina Milian. She spoke Spanish before learning English and is fluent in both languages. The family moved from Astoria, Queens, to Miami when she was eight years old. She graduated from St. Brendan High School.

Milian earned her undergraduate degree in psychology from the University of Miami. She then attended Georgetown University Law Center, earning her J.D. She spent a year working at Harvard Law School, where she served as director of training for the Guatemala Project. She was responsible for training the Guatemalan trial judiciary, defense, and prosecution bar in investigatory and trial techniques.

== Career ==
=== Legal career ===
Milian was appointed assistant state attorney for the Dade County State Attorney's Office by Janet Reno, who was then the county's state attorney. After ten years in that position, she then worked for the Miami County Court, serving in the domestic violence, criminal, and civil divisions. In 1999, Florida governor Jeb Bush appointed Milian to the Miami Circuit Court, where she served in the Criminal Division. In 2001, she replaced Jerry Sheindlin as judge of The People's Court, and became the first Hispanic judge on any English-language television court show. Milian has listed as an adjunct faculty member of the University of Miami School of Law, teaching litigation skills.

=== The People's Court ===
Halfway through the 2000-2001 television season, which Milian became the presiding judge on the revival of the arbitration-based reality court show The People's Court after Jerry Sheindlin, who had been presiding since September 1999, left the series midway through its fourth season. She was the third judge to preside over the revival, which premiered in 1997 with former New York City mayor Ed Koch in the judge's seat.

She would remain as the presiding judge for the remainder of the revival's run, which concluded at the end of the 2022-23 television season. During the revival's sixteenth season, Milian became the longest presiding judge in the history of The People's Court; in doing this she surpassed the previous mark held by Joseph Wapner, the arbiter of the original People's Court series that ran from 1981 until 1993.

In contrast to The People's Court's previous arbiters, Milian is considerably more animated in her role, but she's also known for being levelheaded and logical in her observations and handling of the cases. Although engaging for the most part, Milian also dishes out a good-natured, lively sass at the litigants and does not tolerate any disrespect from them.

Milian explains Americans' fascination with the court show genre: "We are a fast-food nation. People love to see resolution, they want to watch someone who has done wrong confronted and see justice prevail … all in an hour."

Milian was portrayed by Cecily Strong in a 2017 Saturday Night Live parody of The People's Court where she presided over a case between President Donald Trump and three judges of the United States Court of Appeals for the Ninth Circuit.

=== Justice for the People with Judge Milian ===
In April 2023, it was reported that Allen Media Group had signed Milian to a new show, Justice for the People with Judge Milian, and the show premiered in syndication fall 2023. In July 2025, the show was nominated for an Emmy Award.

== Personal life ==
Milian is married to John Schlesinger, a former assistant United States attorney who was elected to the 11th Judicial Circuit Court for Miami-Dade County, Florida, the same position that Milian held before retiring to host The People's Court. They live in Coral Gables, Florida with their three children.

Milian is the spokesperson for the Federal Bureau of Investigation's Safe Online Surfing (FBI-SOS) campaign. In 2019, she appeared on the daytime version of Who Wants to Be a Millionaire?, winning $5,000 for Camp Fiesta, a Florida summer camp free for children with cancer.

== Television credits ==
Television
Year(s)	Title	Role	Notes
2001–2023	The People's Court	Herself	
2002	As the World Turns	Judge	4 episodes
2007	George Lopez	Judge Alvarez	2 episodes
2023	Lopez vs Lopez	Judge Justicia	1 episodes
2023–present	Justice for the People	Herself	

== See also ==
- List of Hispanic and Latino American jurists

Legal offices
Preceded by Jerry Sheindlin	Judge of The People's Court; March 12, 2001–July 21, 2023	Succeeded by Series ended
