= Lexington Hotel (Chicago) =

Hotel in Chicago, Illinois

Coordinates: 41°51′11.5″N 87°37′24.0″W

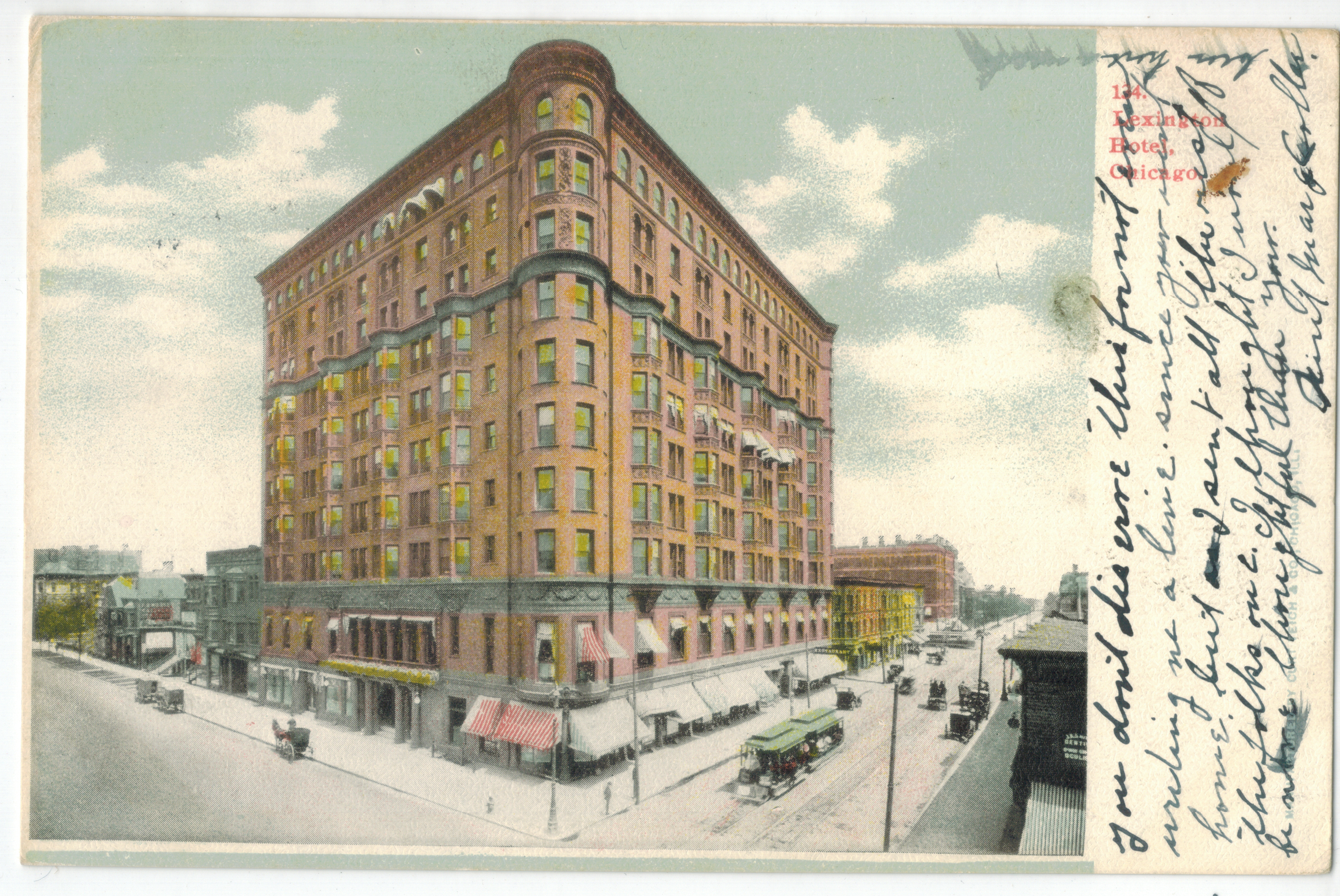

General information
- Completed: 1891/1892
- Demolished: 1995

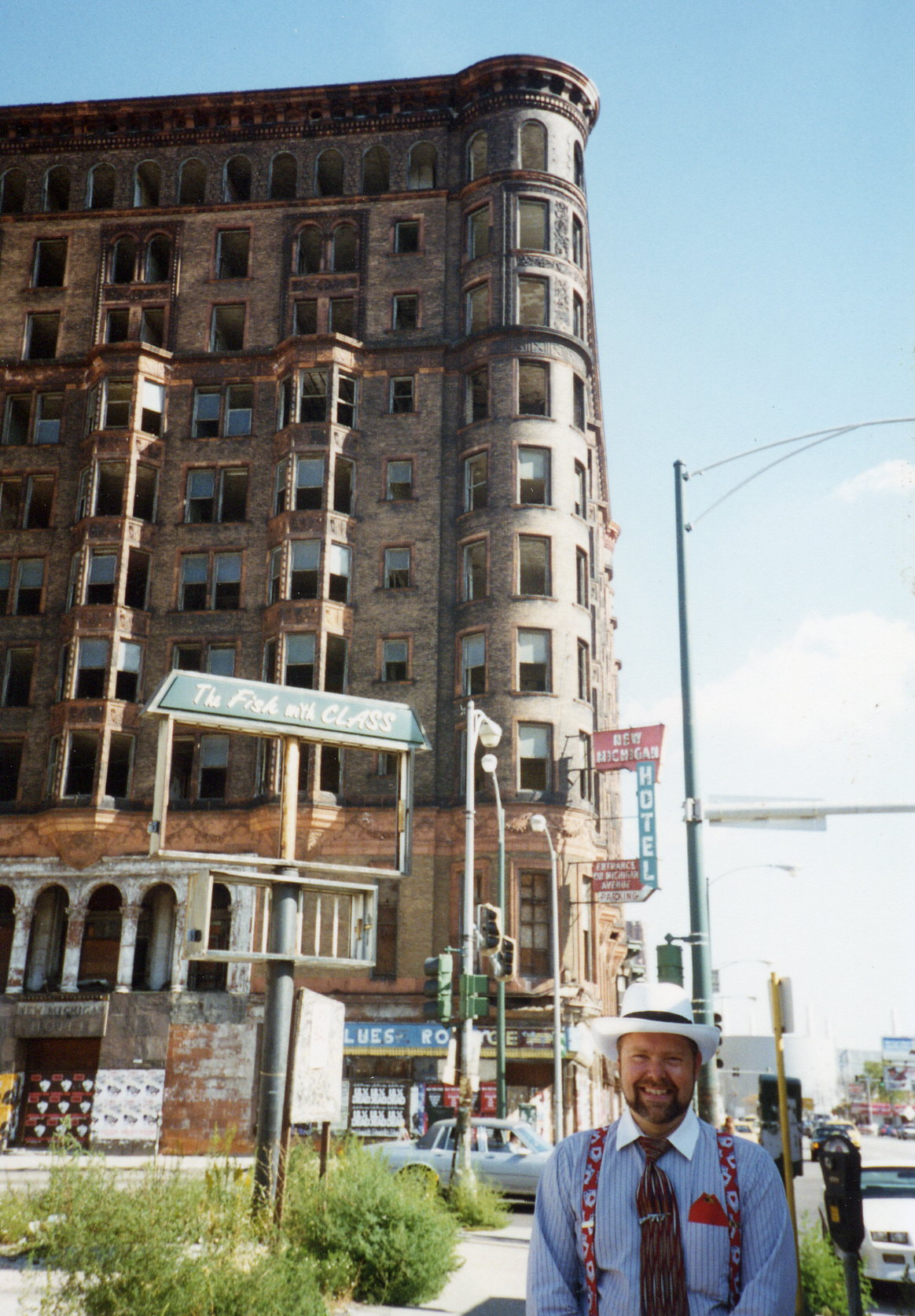
The hotel in a dilapidated state in the late 20th century (tour guide in foreground)

The Lexington Hotel was a 10-story hotel in Chicago at 2135 S. Michigan Avenue.

== History ==
The Lexington Hotel was built in 1892 (or 1891) for attendees of the Columbian Exposition. The hotel is notable for being Al Capone's primary residence from July 1928 until his arrest in 1931. After the Saint Valentine's Day Massacre, some commenters called the hotel "Capone's Castle." It was later renamed "The New Michigan Hotel" and functioned as a brothel with 400 rooms. The hotel closed in 1980.

The hotel was featured on S7:Ep21 of This Old House. It was being renovated at the time.

On April 21, 1986, locked vaults found in the hotel were the subject of a live television program called The Mystery of Al Capone's Vaults, which received 30 million viewers. The building was demolished in 1995, despite its presence on the list of Chicago landmarks and the National Register of Historic Places. The location where the hotel once stood is currently the site of a 296 unit residential high rise, the Lex, completed in 2012.
