= Jerry Sheindlin =

American judge (born 1933)

- Born: Gerald Sheindlin; November 19, 1933 (age 92); New York City, U.S.
- Education: Long Island University (BA); Brooklyn Law School (LLB)
- Occupations: Attorney, author, jurist, television personality
- Known for: The People's Court
- Office: Trial Judge of the New York Supreme Court
- Spouses: Suzanne Rosenthal (m. 1965; div. 1977) Judy Blum (m. 1978; div. 1990) (m. 1991)
- Children: 3

Gerald "Jerry" Sheindlin (born November 19, 1933) is an American author, television personality, jurist and attorney. He spent many years as a trial judge serving the New York Supreme Court.

== Life and career ==
After serving in the Army during the Korean War, Sheindlin received a B.A. from Long Island University and a L.L.B from Brooklyn Law School, in 1959. He is the author of two books, Genetic Fingerprinting: The Law and Science of DNA Evidence and Blood Trail.

Following his career as a trial judge, Sheindlin became a television arbitrator when he replaced former New York City Mayor Ed Koch as the presiding judge on The People's Court in the fall of 1999. This put him in competition with his wife Judith Sheindlin, a fellow former judge who presided over top-rated court show Judge Judy, which ran for 25 seasons from 1996 to 2021 and led to spin-off courtroom streaming series Judy Justice. Jerry presided over The People’s Court for the 1999–2000 season and most of the 2000–2001 season, after which he left the series and was replaced by Marilyn Milian.

== Personal life ==
He is married to Judy Sheindlin, better known as Judge Judy (so named after her court TV series). The two married in 1978, a second marriage for both. They were divorced in 1990, but they remarried in 1991. He has 3 children with his first wife, Suzanne Rosenthal (Gregory, Jonathan and Nicole), 2 stepchildren from Judy's first marriage to Ronald Levy (Jamie Hartwright and Adam Levy), 13 grandchildren, and 1 great-grandchild. Jonathan A. Sheindlin is a retinal surgeon and Adam, Greg and Nicole are lawyers; Adam has since followed his stepfather and mother into the televised courtroom series universe, as he served as one of three presiding judges on Tribunal Justice from 2023 to 2026, before launching his own show, Adam's Law, in September 2026.

Media offices
Preceded by Ed Koch	Judge of The People's Court; September 13, 1999 – March 9, 2001	Succeeded by Marilyn Milian
