= 2026 deaths in American television =

The following deaths of notable individuals related to American television occurred in 2026.

== January ==
Date	Name	Age	Notes	Sources
January 1	Victoria Jones	34	Actress and daughter of Tommy Lee Jones. She made a guest appearance on One Tree Hill.	
January 2	Edith Renfrow Smith	111	Supercentenarian. She was featured on Today during a segment on superagers.	
January 4	Michael Reagan	80	Conservative commentator. He was an actor during the 1980s (including on Falcon Crest alongside his mother Jane Wyman) and hosted the first season of the game show Lingo.	
January 5	Tom Cherones	86	Director and producer best known for his work on Seinfeld.	
January 5	Elle Simone	49	Chef best known for hosting America's Test Kitchen.	
January 8	Guy Moon	63	Composer best known for Oh Yeah! Cartoons, The Fairly OddParents, Danny Phantom, 2 Stupid Dogs, Cow and Chicken, Grim & Evil, Back at the Barnyard, and Big Time Rush.	
January 9	T. K. Carter	69	Actor (Just Our Luck, Punky Brewster, Good Morning, Miss Bliss, The Sinbad Show)	
January 9	Ted Nichols	97	Composer for Hanna-Barbera cartoons.	
January 10	Manolo Villaverde	91	Cuban-American actor best known as Pepe Peña on ¿Qué Pasa, USA?	
January 11	Thomas Causey	76	Sound engineer (Dallas and Police Story)	
January 11	Erich von Daniken	90	Swiss author and ancient alien astronaut theorist (Ancient Aliens)	
January 13	Scott Adams	68	Creator and executive producer of the UPN animated series Dilbert, which was adapted from his comic strip of the same name.	
January 13	Doug McConnell	80	Journalist best known for hosting Bay Area Backroads on KRON.	
January 16	Bruce Bilson	97	Director (worked on Get Smart, Hogan's Heroes, Barney Miller, and several other television programs)	
January 16	Mark Jones	72	Writer, director, and producer (Ark II, The Skatebirds, Captain Caveman and the Teen Angels)	
January 17	Roger Allers	76	Director, writer, animator, and storyboard artist (Animalympics)	
January 22	Guy Hovis	84	Singer (The Lawrence Welk Show)	
January 22	Floyd Vivino	74	Actor and musician best known for hosting The Uncle Floyd Show on public access television.	
January 23	Ed Bernard	86	Actor (Police Woman, The White Shadow)	
January 23	Yvonne Lime	90	Actress (Father Knows Best, The Adventures of Ozzie and Harriet, Happy)	
January 25	Geoffrey Mason	85	Television sports producer (several networks, most notably for ABC and its coverage of the terrorist attack at the 1972 Summer Olympics)	
January 26	Frederick King Keller	75	Director, producer, and screenwriter (Hey Dude, New York Undercover, The Pretender)	
January 26	Produce Pete	80	Television personality (WNBC and WCAU) and commercial spokesperson (Pathmark Supermarkets)	
January 30	Catherine O'Hara	71	Canadian-born actress (Schitt's Creek, Second City Television, The Studio), Emmy winner (1982, 2020)	
January 30	Demond Wilson	79	Actor (Sanford and Son, Baby... I'm Back!, The New Odd Couple)	

== February ==
Date	Name	Age	Notes	Sources
February 2	Chuck Negron	83	Singer-songwriter and founding member of Three Dog Night. He was featured in a season 2 episode of Intervention about his son Chuckie.	
February 3	Lamonte McLemore	90	Singer and founding member of The 5th Dimension. He and his groupmates made numerous television appearances, including on The Ed Sullivan Show.	
February 6	John Wheeler	95	Actor (various recurring or guest roles, notably the "Journey to Babel" episode of Star Trek, as well as the 1971 "Grab a Bucket and a Mop" commercial for McDonald's)	
February 7	Brad Arnold	47	Lead vocalist and founding member of 3 Doors Down. He and his bandmates made numerous television appearances.	
February 10	Shelly Desai	90	Indian-born actor (Men of a Certain Age, It's Always Sunny in Philadelphia)	
February 11	Bud Cort	77	Actor (Columbo, Bernice Bobs Her Hair, Brave New World)	
February 11	James Van Der Beek	48	Actor best known as Dawson Leery on Dawson's Creek and as a fictionalized version of himself in Don't Trust the B— in Apartment 23	
February 14	Tom Noonan	74	Actor (Tales from the Darkside, The Equalizer, Monsters)	
February 15	Robert Duvall	95	Actor best known as Augustus "Gus" McCrae on Lonesome Dove	
February 16	Jane Baer	91	Animator (Hot Wheels, The Fonz and the Happy Days Gang, The Smurfs)	
February 17	Jesse Jackson	84	Civil rights activist, politician, ordained minister, and host of CNN's Both Sides with Jesse Jackson (1992–2000)	
February 19	Eric Dane	53	Actor (Charmed, Grey's Anatomy, Euphoria)	
February 20	Ismael Kanater	69	Moroccan actor (Babylon 5, Alias, Sleeper Cell)	
February 21	Willie Colón	75	Salsa musician and social activist. He guest starred in a season 3 episode of Miami Vice.	
February 23	Robert Carradine	71	Actor best known as Sam McGuire on Lizzie McGuire	
February 23	Gary Dontzig	79	Actor (guest roles on The Waltons, Chico and the Man, and other series) and writer/producer (Murphy Brown, Suddenly Susan, State of Grace)	
February 23	Sondra Lee	97	Actress (Starlit Time, The Voice of Firestone, Hansel and Gretel)	
February 23	Monti Rock	86	Hairdresser best known for his "famous for being famous" guest appearances on The Merv Griffin Show and The Tonight Show Starring Johnny Carson; appeared on The Midnight Special as his alter-ego Disco-Tex	
February 24	Lauren Chapin	80	Actress best known as Kathy "Kitten" Anderson on Father Knows Best	
February 24	Maria O'Brien	75	Actress and acting coach for Days of Our Lives	
February 27	Neil Sedaka	86	Singer-songwriter. He made appearances as himself on shows like The Sonny & Cher Comedy Hour, The Midnight Special, The Carol Burnett Show, American Idol, and The King of Queens and created and hosted the web series Today's Mini-Concert	
February 28	Annabel Schofield	62	Welsh-born model and actress best known as Laurel Ellis on Dallas.	

== March ==
Date	Name	Age	Notes	Sources
March 2	Stephen Hibbert	68	British-American actor (Newhart, Just Shoot Me!, Jericho) and writer (Late Night with David Letterman, Darkwing Duck, Animaniacs)	
March 4	Lou Holtz	89	Football coach (Notre Dame, South Carolina, New York Jets) and color commentator for CBS and ESPN	
March 5	Corey Parker	60	Actor (Thirtysomething, Flying Blind, Will & Grace) and acting coach	
March 5	Sandy Wernick	86	Producer (ALF, Def Comedy Jam)	
March 6	Jennifer Runyon	65	Actress (Another World, Charles in Charge, A Very Brady Christmas)	
March 7	Country Joe McDonald	84	Singer-songwriter. He appeared in Tales of the City.	
March 11	Ernie Anastos	82	News anchor for New York's WABC-TV, WCBS-TV, WWOR-TV, and WNYW-TV	
March 15	Matt Clark	89	Actor (Ben Casey, Bob Hope Presents the Chrysler Theatre, T.H.E. Cat)	
March 15	Sam Kieth	63	Comics artist and writer (co-writer of the Cow and Chicken pilot, "No Smoking", with his cousin and series creator David Feiss).	
March 16	Eric Overmyer	74	Writer/producer (several series, notably Homicide: Life on the Street, The Wire, Treme, and Bosch)	
March 16	Orion Samuelson	91	Farming news broadcaster (U.S. Farm Report, This Week in Agribusiness)	
March 16	Kiki Shepard	74	Television host (Showtime at the Apollo) and actress (recurring/guest roles on Thunder in Paradise, NYPD Blue, and other series)	
March 19	Chuck Norris	86	Actor best known for playing Cordell Walker on the original Walker, Texas Ranger and as a spokesman for Total Gym Fitness.	
March 20	Nicholas Brendon	54	Actor best known as Xander Harris on Buffy the Vampire Slayer.	
March 20	Jessie Jones	75	Actress (Murphy Brown, Melrose Place, Night Court)	
March 23	Valerie Perrine	82	Actress (Leo & Liz in Beverly Hills, CBS Summer Playhouse, Northern Exposure)	
March 25	Dash Crofts	87	Singer-songwriter and member of Seals & Crofts. He and his partner Jim Seals performed the theme song, "First Years", for the first season of The Paper Chase.	
March 26	James Tolkan	94	Actor (Naked City, Remington Steele, Miami Vice)	
March 28	Alex Duong	42	Actor and comedian best known as Sonny Le on Blue Bloods.	
March 28	Mary Beth Hurt	79	Actress (Kojak, Great Performances, Tattingers)	
March 29	Laurie Webb	101	Welsh actor (Sid Caesar Invites You)	

== April ==
Date	Name	Age	Notes	Sources
April 1	Tom Valenti	67	Chef. He made television appearances on shows like The Martha Stewart Show, Today, and The Early Show.	
April 2	Dee Freeman	66	Actress (The Young and the Restless, Seinfeld, Sistas)	
April 2	James Gadson	86	Drummer and session musician. He was featured in an episode of Gordon Ramsay's 24 Hours to Hell and Back about his niece's restaurant.	
April 4	Arne Olsen	64	Canadian screenwriter (Escape from Atlantis, Hybrid)	
April 4	Mark Piznarski	71	Director (Veronica Mars, Gossip Girl, 90210)	
April 6	Angela Pleasence	84	English actress (A Christmas Carol)	
April 6	Nick Pope	60	English journalist and television personality. He was a regular guest on Ancient Aliens.	
April 7	Barbara Gordon	90	Producer and filmmaker. She worked on shows for NBC, WCBS, NET, and PBS.	
April 7	Michael Patrick	35	Irish actor (Game of Thrones)	
April 8	Mario Adorf	95	German actor (Marco Polo)	
April 9	Afrika Bambaataa	68	DJ and rapper. Television appearances include voice-over work for Kung Faux.	
April 10	Harry Kim	74	Trumpeter. He acted as horn section leader and arranger for five seasons of American Idol, as well as for America's Got Talent and Celebrity Duets.	
April 10	Sid Krofft	96	Canadian producer and puppeteer. Through Sid & Marty Krofft Pictures, he and his younger brother Marty created shows like H.R. Pufnstuf, Land of the Lost, and Sigmund and the Sea Monsters.	
April 11	John Nolan	87	English actor (Masterpiece Theatre, Person of Interest, Dune: Prophecy)	
April 13	Jean Walkinshaw	99	Producer. She produced content for History Channel, KING-TV, and KCTS.	
April 14	Joy Harmon	85	Actress (Gidget, Batman, The Monkees)	
April 16	Garret Anderson	53	Professional baseball player. He was a Los Angeles Angels pregame and postgame reporter during home games and some road games on Fox Sports West in 2012.	
April 17	Nathalie Baye	77	French actress (And the Band Played On)	
April 17	Mariclare Costello	90	Actress best known as Rosemary Hunter on The Waltons.	
April 17	Nadia Farès	57	French actress (The Exile)	
April 17	Bob Kevoian	75	Radio host. His radio program, The Bob & Tom Show, aired on WGN America from 2008 to 2010.	
April 18	Van Hammer	66	Professional wrestler (WCW, WWF)	
April 18	Rif Hutton	70	Actor best known as Dr. Ron Welch on Doogie Howser, M.D..	
April 19	Patrick Muldoon	57	Actor (Saved by the Bell, Days of Our Lives, Melrose Place)	
April 20	Alan Osmond	76	Musician and member of The Osmonds. Voiced himself on the animated series of the same name. He also appeared alongside three of his brothers on episodes of shows like Walt Disney's Wonderful World of Color, The Andy Williams Show, The Osmond Family Show and The Travels of Jaimie McPheeters.	
April 20	David Wilcock	53	Paranormal writer and media personality. He was a regular guest on Ancient Aliens.	
April 21	Luis Puenzo	80	Argentine director, producer, and screenwriter (Broken Silence)	
April 22	Darrell Sheets	67	Television personality best known for appearing on Storage Wars.	
April 22	Michael Tilson Thomas	81	Conductor, composer, and pianist. He made numerous television appearances, including on Great Performances, Bugs and Daffy's Carnival of the Animals, and Keeping Score.	
April 25	Matt DeCaro	70	Actor best known as Roy Geary on Prison Break.	
April 26	Nedra Talley	80	Singer and member of The Ronettes. She performed alongside her groupmates on shows like Shindig!, American Bandstand, and Hullabaloo.	
April 27	Gerry Conway	73	Comic book writer, television writer, and producer (Father Dowling Mysteries, Diagnosis: Murder, Matlock)	
April 30	Gwen Farrell	93	Actress and boxing referee. She played various nurses in recurring roles on M*A*S*H throughout the show's run.	
April 30	Bobby Murray	72	Guitarist, songwriter, and record producer. He performed with Etta James' Roots Band on shows like The Tonight Show, Austin City Limits, and Late Night with David Letterman.	

== May ==
Date	Name	Age	Notes	Sources
May 2	David Kendall	68	Writer, producer, and director (Growing Pains, Boy Meets World, Smart Guy, Ned's Declassified School Survival Guide, iCarly, Melissa & Joey)	
May 4	John Sterling	87	Sportscaster (SportsChannel New York, WOR-TV, YES Network)	
May 4	Jonathan Tiersten	60	Actor (Another World)	
May 6	Ted Turner	87	Founder and namesake of the Turner Broadcasting System and its constituent channels TBS, TNT, Turner Classic Movies, Turner South, Cartoon Network and Boomerang. He was also the creator of the 24-hour news cycle for CNN and Headline News (both of which he also founded); as well as the co-creator of the animated series Captain Planet and the Planeteers and the founder of the wrestling promotion World Championship Wrestling.	
May 7	Pat Caputo	67	Sportswriter and broadcaster. He regularly contributed to the Detroit Tigers round table segment on WDIV-TV and hosted a segment called Caputo's Corner on Pro-Am Sports System from 1990 to 1992.	
May 7	Joni Lamb	65	Christian broadcaster and co-founder and president of the Daystar Television Network.	
May 8	Jo Ann Castle	86	Pianist (The Lawrence Welk Show)	
May 8	Joe Sedelmaier	92	Director of several television commercials, notably "Where's the beef?" for Wendy's and "Fast Talking Man" for Federal Express	
May 9	Jennifer Harmon	82	Actress (How to Survive a Marriage, One Life to Live, Loving, Guiding Light)	
May 10	John Barbour	93	Canadian-American comedian, writer, actor (roles on Sanford and Son, Get Smart, and other series), and host (KABC-TV's AM Los Angeles, Real People)	
May 12	Donald Gibb	71	Actor (1st & Ten, Stand by Your Man)	
May 14	Claudine Longet	84	French singer and actress best known for appearing on The Andy Williams Show alongside her ex-husband Andy Williams and their children.	
May 16	Dennis Locorriere	76	Singer. He appeared with his band Dr. Hook & The Medicine Show on The Midnight Special.	
May 16	James Robison	82	Televangelist (Life Today)	
May 18	Tom Kane	64	Voice actor (The Powerpuff Girls, Star Wars: Clone Wars, Foster's Home for Imaginary Friends)	
May 18	Caitlin O'Heaney	73	Actress (Apple Pie, Tales of the Gold Monkey, The Charmings)	
May 20	Jeffrey Lane	71	Writer (Lou Grant, Ryan's Hope, Cagney & Lacey)	
May 21	Kyle Busch	41	Race car driver (NASCAR). Appeared as himself on Good Morning America, Jeopardy!, and Wheel of Fortune.	
May 21	Peter Helm	84	Canadian-American actor (Rawhide, The Farmer's Daughter, Ironside)	
May 22	Grizz Chapman	52	Actor best known as Grizz on 30 Rock.	
May 22	Charles Cioffi	90	Actor (Bonanza, Hawaii Five-O, Get Christie Love!)	
May 25	Pierre Deny	69	French actor (Emily in Paris)	
May 26	William Smithers	98	Actor best known as David Schuster on Peyton Place and as Jeremy Wendell on Dallas.	
May 26	Howard Storm	94	Actor (The New Dick Van Dyke Show, Rhoda, Sanford and Son) and director (Laverne & Shirley, Busting Loose, Joanie Loves Chachi)	
May 27	Owain Rhys Davies	44	Welsh actor (The OA, Twin Peaks)	
May 28	Ellen Weston	87	Actress (Guiding Light, Another World, The Young and the Restless) and writer (Capitol)	
May 30	Kelly Curtis	69	Actress (The Renegades, The Equalizer, Kojak: Ariana)	
May 30	Joe Negri	99	Jazz guitarist, educator, and actor (67 Melody Lane, Adventure Time, Mister Rogers' Neighborhood)	
May 31	Robert Kya-Hill	95	Actor (The Edge of Night, One Life to Live, Roots: The Next Generations)	

== June ==
Date	Name	Age	Notes	Sources
June 1	Anthony Head	72	English actor best known as Rupert Giles on Buffy the Vampire Slayer and as Rupert Mannion on Ted Lasso.	
June 2	Peabo Bryson	75	Singer and songwriter. He performed a lyrical version of One Life to Live's theme song and appeared on an episode to sing it.	
June 3	James Handy	81	Actor (The Room Upstairs, A Dangerous Life, Midnight Caller)	
June 4	Patrick Godfrey	93	English actor (His Dark Materials)	
June 5	David Sheiner	98	Actor (Columbo, The Big Valley, The Twilight Zone)	
June 6	Anthony Guidera	65	Actor (Renegade, Baywatch, Star Trek: Deep Space Nine)	
June 7	Stacey King	59	Professional basketball player and sports announcer (color commentator for Chicago Bulls television broadcasts starting in 2006)	
June 9	Gilad Janklowicz	71	Israeli-born fitness personality best known for hosting Bodies in Motion.	
June 9	Janie Sell	86	Actress (Captain Kangaroo)	
June 10	John Sanders	83	Sports broadcaster (WIBW-TV, KMBC-TV, KDKA-TV)	
June 11	Margaret Kerry	97	Voice actress (Clutch Cargo, The New 3 Stooges)	
June 12	Ronnie Schell	94	Actor (Gomer Pyle – USMC, Good Morning World)	
June 12	Gene Shalit	100	Film critic and journalist (Today)	
June 14	Anne Schedeen	77	Actress best known as Kate Tanner on ALF.	
June 14	Oliver Tree	32	Singer and songwriter. Television appearances include The Late Late Show with James Corden, The Late Show with Stephen Colbert, and Jimmy Kimmel Live!.	
June 16	Daveigh Chase	35	Actress best known for voicing Lilo Pelekai on Lilo & Stitch: The Series.	
June 16	The Duke of Dorchester	81	Professional wrestler (World (Wide) Wrestling Federation)	
June 17	Tony Brown	93	Journalist and host of Tony Brown's Journal	
June 17	Tom Dreesen	86	Stand-up comedian (numerous television appearances, most notably as a guest on The Tonight Show Starring Johnny Carson and Late Show with David Letterman)	
June 17	Walter Parazaider	81	Woodwind musician and founding member of Chicago (Chicago's New Year's Rockin' Eve 1975, Saturday Night Live, ABC In Concert)	
June 17	Beau Williams	76	Gospel singer. He appeared as a contestant on Star Search in 1984. He also appeared on Success-N-Life on BET and made frequent appearances on the Trinity Broadcasting Network.	
June 18	Justin Cary	50	Bass guitarist for Sixpence None the Richer. He and his band members appeared as themselves on shows such as Late Show with David Letterman, The Tonight Show with Jay Leno, and Sabrina the Teenage Witch.	
June 19	James Burrows	85	Director/producer (The Mary Tyler Moore Show, Taxi, Cheers, and Will & Grace)	
June 22	Joby Baker	92	Canadian actor (The George Burns and Gracie Allen Show, Good Morning World, Perry Mason, Combat!)	
June 22	Martha Zoller	66	Political commentator. She made frequent guest appearances on such shows as Talkback Live, Hannity & Colmes, and Larry King Live.	
June 24	Ann Blyth	98	Actress (The DuPont Show with June Allyson, The Dick Powell Theatre, Saints and Sinners)	
June 24	Harold Wheeler	82	Musician (conductor and music arranger for several Academy Awards ceremonies, music director for the first seventeen seasons of Dancing with the Stars)	
June 26	Joe Doering	44	Professional wrestler best known for his appearances on TNA programming.	
June 28	Wilford Lloyd Baumes	86	Screenwriter and producer best known for creating The Love Boat.	

== July ==
Date	Name	Age	Notes	Sources
July 3	John Parisella	81	Horse trainer and stepfather of Bethenny Frankel. He appeared twice on The Johnny Carson Show.	
July 4	Slaine Kelly	43	Irish actress best known as Jane Howard on The Tudors.	
July 5	Johnny Ginger	92	Actor and television personality (presenter of Curtain Time Theater, The Johnny Ginger Show, and Captain Detroit for local television stations in Detroit)	
July 6	Louise Lasser	87	Actress best known as the titular main character of Mary Hartman, Mary Hartman.	
July 7	Joanna Pettet	83	English actress (Route 66, The Doctors, The Nurses)	
July 8	Harris Katleman	97	Producer (The Don Rickles Show, Branded, From Here to Eternity)	
July 8	Bonnie Tyler	75	Welsh singer. Television appearances include musical performances on Celebrity Duets and Best Time Ever.	
July 9	Randolph Mantooth	80	Actor best known as Johnny Gage on Emergency!	
July 9	Peter Van Norden	75	Actor (Cheers, St. Elsewhere, T. J. Hooker)	
July 10	Josh Grisetti	44	Actor (The Knights of Prosperity, The Marvelous Mrs. Maisel)	
July 10	Ralph Hemecker	65	Director (Witchblade, Blue Bloods, Once Upon a Time, The Flash)	
July 10	Wai Ching Ho	82	Hong Kong actress (One Life to Live, Swans Crossing, Law & Order)	
July 11	Lindsey Graham	71	Politician who frequently appeared on Fox News, ABC, CBS, NBC, and CNN.	
July 12	Scott Bryce	68	Actor best known as Craig Montgomery on As the World Turns.	
July 13	Sam Neill	78	Northern Irish-born New Zealand actor (The Tudors, Crusoe, Happy Town)	
July 14	Dave Kendall	68	British-born journalist best known as the creator and host of 120 Minutes on MTV.	
July 15	John Kirby	75	Actor (Maude, Sanford and Son, The Fall Guy) and acting coach	
July 15	Hal Williams	91	Actor (Sanford and Son, The Waltons, Private Benjamin, 227)	
July 17	Freddy Cannon	89	Singer (regular on American Bandstand; wrote and performed themes to Where the Action Is and Svengoolie)	
July 18	Jim Gilstrap	79	Singer and session musician. He was co-lead vocals to the theme of Good Times.	
July 19	Peter Lassally	93	Producer (The Tonight Show Starring Johnny Carson, Late Night with David Letterman, Late Show with David Letterman, The Late Late Show with Craig Ferguson)	
July 20	Zale Parry	93	Actress (Sea Hunt, GE Theatre, Wagon Train) and scuba diver	
July 21	Kaylee Hottle	18	Actress (Magnum P.I.)	
July 23	Hope Clarke	85	Actress, choreographer, dancer, and vocalist. She guest-starred on such shows as Hill Street Blues, Another World, and As the World Turns.	
July 29	Glen Hansard	56	Irish singer-songwriter. Television appearances include The Simpsons, Parenthood, and Jimmy Kimmel Live!	
July 29	Scott Hylands	83	Canadian actor best known as Detective Kevin O'Brien on Night Heat and Ennis Stussy on season 3 of Fargo.	

== August ==
Date	Name	Age	Notes	Sources
August 1	Vincent Pastore	80	Actor best known as Sal Bonpensiero on The Sopranos	
August 3	Jon Cypher	94	Actor best known as Chief Fletcher Daniels on Hill Street Blues and General Marcus Craig on Major Dad	
August 4	Dory Funk Jr.	85	WWE Hall of Fame professional wrestler	
August 6	Flo Anthony	74	Gossip columnist (guest appearances on shows including The Ricki Lake Show, Geraldo, and The Sally Jessy Raphael Show; contributor to Inside Edition, The Insider and Entertainment Tonight)	
August 7	Violet Hensley	109	Luthier and musician. Television appearances include The Beverly Hillbillies, The Art Linkletter Show, and Captain Kangaroo.	
August 9	Ben Jones	84	Actor (Cooter Davenport on The Dukes of Hazzard) and politician (U.S. Congressman from Georgia)	
August 11	Christy Knowings	46	Actress best known as a cast member of All That.	
August 13	Mark Rydell	97	Director (The Phil Silvers Show, Mr. Novak, Ben Casey) and actor (The Edge of Night, As the World Turns)	
August 15	Tommy John	83	Baseball pitcher and commentator (Monday Night Baseball, New York Yankees on WPIX)	
August 15	Peggy Webber	100	Actress (Dragnet, M Squad, Kings Row, Night Gallery, The Waltons)	
August 16	Hayden Panettiere	36	Actress best known as Claire Bennet on Heroes and as Juliette Barnes on Nashville.	
August 18	Bill Rasmussen	93	Broadcasting executive and co-founder of ESPN	
August 19	Michael Wright	70	Actor (V: The Series, Oz, Black Lightning)	
August 22	Shelley Fabares	82	Actress (The Donna Reed Show, One Day at a Time, Coach)	
August 24	Jaye P. Morgan	94	Singer and actress best known as a panelist on The Gong Show	
August 25	Tim Curry	80	Voice actor (Captain Planet and the Planeteers, Peter Pan and the Pirates, Mighty Max, Superhuman Samurai Syber-Squad, The Wild Thornberrys) and actor (Stephen King's It as Pennywise the Dancing Clown, The Worst Witch, Addams Family Reunion as Gomez Addams, The Rocky Horror Picture Show: Let's Do the Time Warp Again)	
August 25	Dolly Parton	80	Country music singer-songwriter. She was regular cast member on The Porter Wagoner Show and host of the variety show Dolly (which had two separate runs in 1976 and 1987), she appeared on shows like Designing Women and The Simpsons, as well as the 2023 NFL Thanksgiving Halftime; she was the co-owner of Sandollar Productions, which produced Buffy the Vampire Slayer and its spin-off Angel; she also wrote and preformed the theme song to the television series 9 to 5, which starred her sister Rachel in the role she had originated in the film.	
August 26	Peter Cullen	85	Canadian voice actor (Saturday Supercade, The Transformers, The New Adventures of Winnie the Pooh, Chip 'n Dale: Rescue Rangers)	
August 26	Samuel Monroe Jr.	52	Actor (Out All Night, Murder One, NYPD Blue)	
August 28	Jackie Glass	70	Judge and television personality (Swift Justice with Jackie Glass)	
August 31	Victor Miller	86	Writer (One Life to Live, All My Children, Guiding Light)	

== September ==
Date	Name	Age	Notes	Sources
September 1	Carla Jeffery	33	Actress (Curb Your Enthusiasm, iCarly, Shake It Up, Zombies, American Vandal)	
September 2	Gloria Steinem	92	Journalist and feminist. Television appearances include episodes of The L Word, The Good Wife, and Dear.	
September 5	Georgina Lightning	63	Canadian First Nations actress (Walker, Texas Ranger, The West Wing, Dreamkeeper), writer, and director	
September 5	Robin Morgan	85	Poet, journalist, and feminist. Television appearances include episodes of Mama, Tales of Tomorrow, and Makers: Women Who Make America.	
September 5	Andy Williams	48	Professional wrestler for All Elite Wrestling (AEW).	
September 6	Jim Geoghan	79	Producer and writer best known as the co-creator of The Suite Life of Zack & Cody and its spin-off The Suite Life on Deck.	
September 6	Nina Shipman	88	Actress (Official Detective, The Adventures of Ozzie and Harriet, 77 Sunset Strip)	
September 9	Barry Melrose	70	Former NHL player/coach and hockey analyst for ESPN	
September 9	Mike McFarland	56	Voice actor (Dragon Ball Z, One Piece, Fullmetal Alchemist, Attack on Titan)	
September 12	George Chuvalo	89	Canadian boxer and actor (The New Avengers, Counterstrike, Night Heat)	
September 14	Bob Mackie	87	Costume designer (The Carol Burnett Show, The Sonny & Cher Comedy Hour, Wheel of Fortune). He made guest appearances as himself on episodes of The Love Boat and Hacks.	
September 14	Bernie Orenstein	95	Writer and producer (That Girl, Sanford and Son, Kate & Allie)	
September 15	Ronnie Dove	91	Singer. He appeared as himself on shows like The Ed Sullivan Show, American Bandstand, and The Mike Douglas Show. He also hosted The Ronnie Dove Show in 1966.	
September 15	Gerrit Graham	77	Actor (Star Trek: Deep Space Nine, Star Trek: Voyager)	
September 16	Randy Pedersen	64	Professional bowler and color analyst for ESPN, Fox, and CBS Sports Network.	
September 17	Duncan Sheik	56	Singer-songwriter and composer. He appeared in episodes of Beverly Hills, 90210 and American Dreams.	
September 20	Presley Gerber	27	Model. He appeared in a Pepsi Super Bowl commercial with his mother Cindy Crawford.	
September 21	Chris Spatola	47	College basketball analyst for ESPN	
September 26	James H. Rosenfield	97	Television executive best known as the president of CBS.	
September 26	Angela Stribling	58	Television and radio personality best known for her work with BET.	
September 27	Dennis Haskins	75	Actor best known as Richard Belding on Saved by the Bell.	
September 27	Pac	40	English professional wrestler (AEW, WWE)	
September 30	Scott Froschauer	57	Key grip (Suspect Device, Sawbones, Black Scorpion)	
September 30	Peppino Mazzullo	100	Italian actor and the voice of Topo Gigio (a frequent guest on The Ed Sullivan Show)	

== October ==
Date	Name	Age	Notes	Sources
October 1	Mary Louise Weller	79	Actress (Baretta, Kojak, CHiPS)	
October 2	Marjoe Gortner	82	Actor (The Marcus-Nelson Murders, Circus of the Stars, Falcon Crest) and evangelist preacher	
October 3	Robert Kelker-Kelly	62	Actor best known as Bo Brady on Days of Our Lives, as well as Sam Fowler and Dr. Shane Roberts on Another World.	
October 5	Jim Bakker	86	Televangelist best known for hosting The PTL Club with his first wife Tammy Faye Messner.	
October 5	Michael Kearns	76	Actor (Cheers, Murder, She Wrote, Beverly Hills, 90210)	
October 5	Reggie McFadden	57	Actor and comedian (In Living Color, Coach, Martin, Curb Your Enthusiasm)	
October 6	Eva Marie Saint	102	Actress (Campus Hoopla, Suspense, Studio One, Moonlighting, The Legend of Korra)	
October 9	Mike Ditka	86	Hall of Fame NFL player and coach; sportscaster (Sunday NFL Countdown, Monday Night Football, SportsCenter)	
October 12	RJ Mitte	34	Actor best known as Walter White Jr. on Breaking Bad.	
October 12	Lucian Piane	46	Songwriter and music producer best known for his work on RuPaul's Drag Race.	
October 14	Michael Forest	97	Actor (The Twilight Zone, The Dick Van Dyke Show, Star Trek) and voice artist (Power Rangers Lightspeed Rescue)	
October 15	Richard Riehle	78	Character actor (Grounded for Life, Star Trek: The Next Generation, Star Trek: Voyager, The Legend of Korra)	
October 16	Michael Gray	75	Actor best known as Billy Batson on Shazam!	
October 19	Kenneth Atchity	82	Producer (Shades of Love, Amityville 4: The Evil Escapes, The Lost Valentine)	
October 21	Tom Skerritt	93	Actor best known as Sheriff Jimmy Brock on Picket Fences.	
October 21	Bob "Hoolihan" Wells	93	Weatherman (WJW/Cleveland), media host (Hoolihan and Big Chuck Show), and actor (OHMS, Superboy)	
October 23	Alan Dysert	75	Actor best known for playing Sean Cudahy on All My Children	
October 25	Eric Bauza	46	Canadian voice actor (Superjail!, Looney Tunes Cartoons, Breadwinners, Kiff, Rise of the Teenage Mutant Ninja Turtles, Bob's Burgers)	
October 25	Kevin Bleyer	54	Writer best known for his work on The Daily Show.	
October 25	Peggy King	96	Singer and actress best known for appearances on The George Gobel Show	
October 25	Walter Koenig	90	Actor best known as Pavel Chekov on Star Trek.	
October 26	Susan Saint James	80	Actress (The Name of the Game, It Takes a Thief, McMillan & Wife, Kate & Allie)	
October 27	Jim Boyd	84	News anchor (WCVB-TV/Boston) and actor (Olive Kitteridge)	
October 27	Ronny Marshall Hallin	88	Producer (Happy Days, Mork & Mindy, Step by Step)	
October 27	Bobby Wright	84	Country music singer. He appeared with his family on The Kitty Wells/Johnnie Wright Family Show and played Willy Moss in McHale's Navy.	
October 28	Barbara Barrie	95	Actress (Barney Miller, Breaking Away, Double Trouble, Suddenly Susan)	
October 28	Elke Sommer	85	German actress (The Six Million Dollar Man, The Muppet Show, Inside the Third Reich)	
October 28	Patrick Stewart	86	English actor best known as Jean-Luc Picard on Star Trek: The Next Generation and Star Trek: Picard.	
October 30	JoBe Cerny	78	Best known for playing The Cheer Man and for voicing the Pillsbury Doughboy	
October 31	Martin Erlichman	97	Producer and talent manager. He was the executive producer for Barbra Streisand's television specials, including the 1994 HBO special Barbra: The Concert.	

== November ==
Date	Name	Age	Notes	Sources
November 1	Tony Butala	87	Lead singer of The Lettermen. With that group, he appeared on shows like The Ed Sullivan Show, The Many Loves of Dobie Gillis, and The Jack Benny Program.	
November 3	Harold Greene	82	News anchor (KCAL-TV/Los Angeles, KCBS-TV/Los Angeles)	
November 4	Kimmarie Johnson	50	Actress and model. She appeared in episodes of Beverly Hills, 90210 and Wanda at Large.	
November 4	Toukie Smith	74	Actress and model best known as Eva Rawley on 227.	
November 5	Julian A. Brodsky	93	Mass media executive and co-founder of Comcast.	
November 8	Hubert Ausbie	88	Professional basketball player and member of the Harlem Globetrotters. Alongside his teammates, he appeared on The Harlem Globetrotters Popcorn Machine and The Harlem Globetrotters on Gilligan's Island.	
November 8	Skip Hinnant	86	Actor (The Patty Duke Show, The Electric Company, 3-2-1 Contact)	
November 9	Bob Mills	79	Furniture store executive. He hosted Bob Mills Furniture Country Show in the 1970s and appeared in commercials for Bob Mills Furniture, which he also founded.	
November 10	Anthony Clark	62	Actor best known as Greg Warner on Yes, Dear.	
November 10	Irma P. Hall	91	Actress best known as Josephine "Big Mama Joe" Joseph on Soul Food.	
November 10	Stacy Keach	85	Actor (Mickey Spillane's Mike Hammer, Titus, Prison Break)	
November 11	Dan Hicks	64	Sportscaster for NBC Sports.	
November 11	Michael John Roberts	48	Canadian director, producer, and animator (TripTank, F Is for Family, BoJack Horseman)	
November 11	Regina Torné	82	Mexican actress (I Spy)	
November 14	Richard Sterban	83	Singer (Stamps Quartet, The Oak Ridge Boys), who appeared frequently with the latter band as television guests	
November 17	Lance Broadway	43	Actor (Lucifer, Agents of S.H.I.E.L.D., Real Husbands of Hollywood) and professional baseball pitcher.	
November 17	Bill Watts	87	WWE Hall of Fame professional wrestler.	
November 18	Larry Poindexter	66	Actor (CHiPs, Happy Days, The Facts of Life) and singer	
November 19	E.J. Carroll	66	Actor best known as Sheriff Victor Sickles on Boardwalk Empire and as Fat Mooney on The Deuce.	
November 20	Tom Jackson	75	Football player and analyst for NFL Primetime.	
c. November 21	Joe Wallach	103	Television broadcasting executive and co-founder of Telemundo.	
