= Disappearance of Charles Bothuell V =

2014 child abuse case in Detroit, Michigan, United States

Disappearance of Charlie Bothuell V
- Location: Detroit, Michigan, U.S.
- Date: 2014
- Attack type: Child abuse, parental child abduction
- Victim: Charlie Bothuell V
- Perpetrators: Charlie Bothuell IV and Monique Dillard-Bothuell
- Charges: Second-degree child abuse (dropped after plea deal); Torture (dismissed)
- Verdict: Pleaded guilty
- Convictions: Fourth-degree child abuse
- Sentence: Bothuell IV: 1 1/2 years probation (Note: Plus mandatory anger management classes and loss of custody.)

The disappearance of Charlie Bothuell V was the case of an American child in Detroit, Michigan who disappeared and was found imprisoned in the basement of his family home in 2014. His father, Charles Bothuell IV, and step-mother, Monique Dillard-Bothuell, were charged with torture and child abuse. In 2016, Bothuell IV pleaded guilty to fourth-degree child abuse after accepting a plea deal.

== History ==
In early 2014, Bothuell IV and Dillard-Bothuell reported their son Bothuell V, then 12 years old, missing. Eleven days after the missing person report was filed, Bothuell V was found alive in the family's basement behind a 55-gallon drum, surrounded by boxes. Bothuell IV learned of the discovery of his son on live television while being interviewed by Nancy Grace, which became a viral video on YouTube.

In April 2015, the couple were arrested and charged with torture and second-degree child abuse. The torture charge, which, if proven, could have resulted in life sentences, was later dismissed by the court.

== Trial and aftermath ==
On January 19, 2016, the case was resolved when Bothuell IV pleaded guilty to fourth-degree child abuse in exchange for removal of the second-degree child-abuse charges.

Prosecutors revealed that Bothuell V was very thin and had marks on his body from the abuse when he was found after being reported missing. Bothuell V testified that he was kept home from school and forced to engage in rigorous exercise routines daily by his parents, in addition to being beaten.

Bothuell IV also admitted to beating Bothuell V with a PVC pipe. He was sentenced to 18 months of probation and mandatory anger management classes. He also lost custody of his son and was ordered to have no further contact with him.

Dillard-Bothuell reportedly accepted a plea deal earlier as well, but the details of this plea were not made public. It was also reported that her record would be cleared after six months if she stayed out of legal trouble.

Bothuell IV passed away June 16, 2023.

== See also ==
- List of solved missing person cases (post-2000)
