= Bob Mills (businessman) =

American businessman (1947–2026)

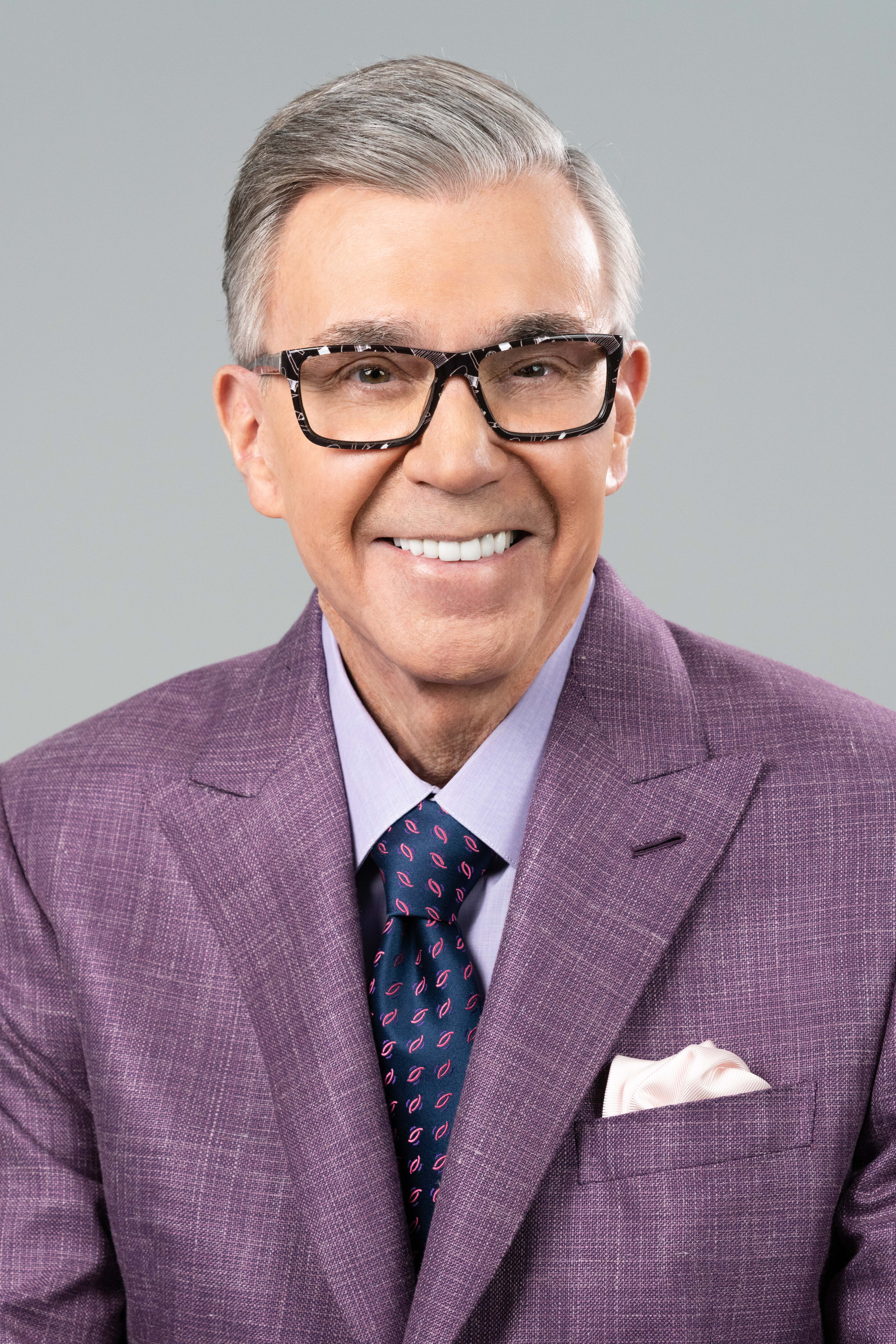
- Mills in 2025
- Born: July 13, 1947; Roswell, New Mexico, U.S.
- Died: November 9, 2026 (aged 79)
- Education: Southwestern Oklahoma State University (BA)
- Occupation: Businessman
- Known for: Founder of Bob Mills Furniture
- Spouse: Margaret Mills
- Children: 3

Robert Mills (July 13, 1947 – November 9, 2026) was an American businessman and founder of Bob Mills Furniture, a regional furniture and mattress retailer based in Oklahoma City, Oklahoma. Founded in 1971, the company operates 12 stores across Oklahoma, Kansas, and Texas, with its most recent showroom opening in San Juan, Texas, in September 2025.

== Early life and education ==
Mills was born in Roswell, New Mexico, and raised in Oklahoma City. He graduated from Putnam City High School in 1965 and earned a degree in business administration from Southwestern Oklahoma State University in 1969.

== Career ==
After college, Mills founded Bob Mills Furniture in 1971 with a focus on offering value furniture and mattresses to Oklahoma residents. The business began in downtown Oklahoma City and has expanded into multiple regional markets including Tulsa, Wichita, San Antonio, Schertz, Amarillo, Lubbock, Midland, Odessa, Temple, Waco, and San Juan, Texas.

== Marketing and media ==
During the 1970s, Mills hosted the “Bob Mills Furniture Country Show,” a local television program that blended product promotions with live musical performances. According to company materials, the show featured appearances from several country musicians. Mills also became a visible figure in Oklahoma broadcasting through sponsorships such as the “Bob Mills SkyNews 9 Chopper” and the “Bob Mills Weather Center,” partnerships with Griffin Media’s KWTV-DT News 9 and KOTV-DT News on 6.

== Community involvement and recognition ==
Mills participated in civic and philanthropic activities in Oklahoma City, including support for youth-focused programs. He was recognized by the Boys & Girls Clubs of Oklahoma County in connection with community initiatives, including contributions toward facility improvements and participation in the organization's annual Champions of Youth awards, where Bob Mills Furniture received the Corporate Champion of Youth award. He was also involved with local charitable events such as the Boys & Girls Clubs’ annual Jolly Holiday Giveaway, which provides holiday gifts for thousands of club members. Mills was recognized by Oklahoma City University’s Meinders School of Business Hall of Honor in 2007 for contributions to business and community service.

== Later developments ==
In September 2025, Bob Mills Furniture opened its twelfth location in San Juan, Texas, marking the retailer's continued expansion in the southern United States. The opening ceremony was attended by city officials and local leaders.

== Personal life and death ==
Mills lived in Oklahoma City with his wife, Margaret. The couple had three children, of whom are all involved in the family business.

Mills died on November 9, 2026, at the age of 79.
