= Nancy Grace =

American legal commentator and television journalist (born 1959)

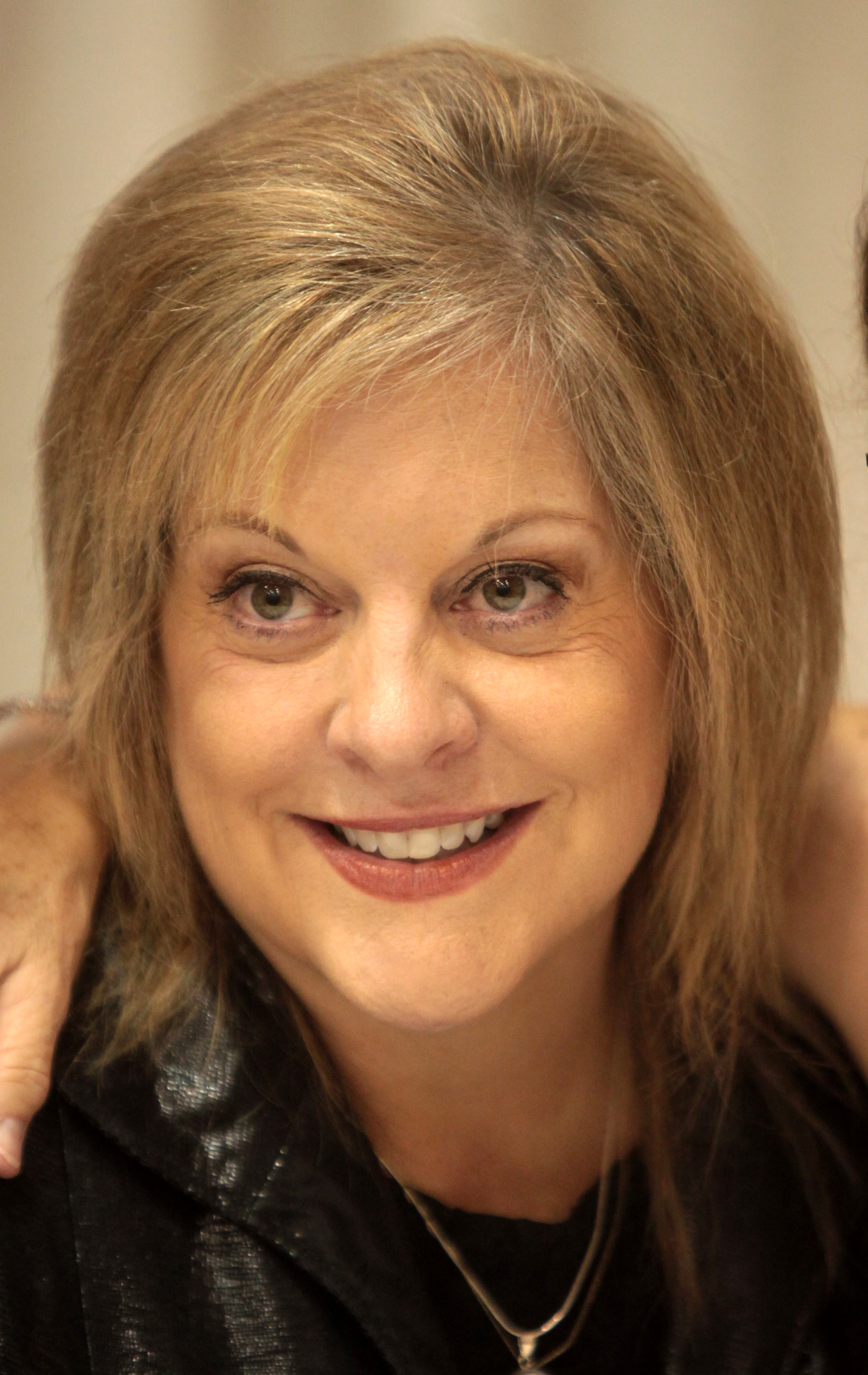
- Grace in 2014
- Born: Nancy Ann Grace; October 23, 1959 (age 67); Macon, Georgia, U.S.
- Education: Mercer University (BA, JD); New York University (LLM)
- Occupations: Political commentator; television personality; former prosecutor
- Years active: 1996–present
- Employer(s): Court TV (1996–2007); HLN (2005–2016); Independent (2016-present)
- Notable credit(s): Closing Arguments anchor (2004–2007); Nancy Grace anchor (2005–2016)
- Spouse: David Linch (m. 2007)
- Children: 2

Nancy Ann Grace (born October 23, 1959) is an American legal commentator and television journalist. She hosted Nancy Grace, a nightly celebrity news and current affairs show on HLN, from 2005 to 2016, and Court TV's Closing Arguments from 1996 to 2007. She also co-wrote the book Objection! How High-Priced Defense Attorneys, Celebrity Defendants, and a 24/7 Media Have Hijacked Our Criminal Justice System. Grace was also the arbiter of Swift Justice with Nancy Grace in the syndicated courtroom reality show's first season.

Grace was formerly a prosecutor in the Atlanta-Fulton County, Georgia District Attorney's office. She frequently discusses issues from what she describes as a victims' rights standpoint, with an outspoken style that has brought her both praise and criticism.

== Early life ==
Nancy Grace was born in Macon, Georgia, the youngest of three children, to factory worker Elizabeth Grace and Mac Grace, a freight agent for Southern Railway. She has two older siblings.

Grace graduated from Macon's Windsor Academy in 1977. She attended Valdosta State University, and later received a B.A. from Mercer University. As a student, Grace was a fan of Shakespearean literature, and intended to become an English professor after graduating from college. But after the murder of her fiancé Keith Griffin in a workplace shooting when she was 19, Grace decided to enroll in law school and went on to become a felony prosecutor and a supporter of victims' rights.

Grace received her Juris Doctor from the Walter F. George School of Law at Mercer, where she was a member of the law review. She went on to earn a Master of Laws in constitutional and criminal law from New York University. She was awarded an honorary Doctorate of Letters from Jacksonville State University in 2023. She has written articles and opinion pieces for legal periodicals, including the American Bar Association Journal. She worked as a clerk for a federal court judge and practiced antitrust and consumer protection law with the Federal Trade Commission. She taught litigation at the Georgia State University College of Law and business law at GSU's School of Business. She is part of Mercer University's board of trustees and adopted a section of the street surrounding the law school.

== Career as prosecutor ==
Grace worked for nearly a decade in the Atlanta-Fulton County, Georgia, District Attorney's office as Special Prosecutor. Her work focused on felony cases involving serial murder, serial rape, serial child molestation, and serial arson. She left the prosecutors' office after the District Attorney she had been working under decided not to run for reelection.

While a prosecutor, Grace was reprimanded by the Supreme Court of Georgia twice, once for withholding exculpatory evidence in a 1994 arson and murder case. The court overturned the conviction in that case and found that Grace's behavior "demonstrated her disregard of the notions of due process and fairness and was inexcusable." Grace was reprimanded again by the Supreme Court of Georgia after the court found she "had injected prejudicial matters not in evidence [to the case] by making reference to a drug-related, execution-style triple murder and to a serial rapist in her closing argument" in a heroin trafficking case. Additionally, the United States Court of Appeals for the 11th Crcuit found that she "'played fast and loose' with her ethical duties" by knowingly using false testimony in a murder case.

== Career as broadcaster ==
After leaving the Fulton County prosecutors' office, Grace was approached by and accepted an offer from Court TV founder Steven Brill to do a legal commentary show alongside Johnnie Cochran. When Cochran left the show, Grace was moved to a solo trial coverage show on Court TV, hosting Trial Heat from 1996 to 2004 then Closing Arguments from 2004 to 2007, replacing Lisa Bloom and James Curtis, both of whom were hosting Trial Heat at that point.

In February 2005, she began hosting a regular primetime legal analysis show called Nancy Grace on CNN Headline News (now HLN) in addition to her Court TV show. On May 9, 2007, Grace announced that she would be leaving Court TV to focus more on her CNN Headline News Program and charity work. She did her last show on Court TV on June 19, 2007.

Grace has a distinctive interviewing style mixing vocal questions with multimedia stats displays. The Foundation of American Women in Radio & Television has presented Nancy Grace with two Gracie Awards for her Court TV show.

While still hosting Nancy Grace, she also hosted Swift Justice with Nancy Grace which premiered September 13, 2010, and ran until May 2011. Grace left the show due to productions moving from Atlanta to Los Angeles. In September 2011, Judge Jackie Glass, who is known for presiding over the O. J. Simpson robbery case, took over Grace's place. The show continued for one more season and ceased production in 2012.

Grace had been covering the Casey Anthony story for years. After the controversial verdict finding Casey Anthony not guilty, her Nancy Grace show on HLN had its highest ratings ever in the 8:00 p.m. and 9:00 p.m. hour slots on Tuesday, July 5, 2011.

On October 13, 2016, at the end of her contract, Grace hosted her last show.

On July 13, 2019, an Oxygen TV channel true crime series began, hosted by Grace and titled Injustice with Nancy Grace with criminal cases being the subject of episodes that seek to bring to light unjust accusations, bungled investigations, arcane evidence, new motives, and shocking sentences.

=== Controversies ===
In a 2011 New York Times article, David Carr wrote, "Since her show began in 2005, the presumption of innocence has found a willful enemy in the former prosecutor turned broadcast judge-and-jury". He criticized her handling of the kidnapping of Elizabeth Smart, the Duke lacrosse case, the Melinda Duckett interview and suicide, and the Caylee Anthony case. George Washington University law professor Jonathan Turley told Carr that Grace, as an attorney and reporter, "has managed to demean both professions with her hype, rabid persona, and sensational analysis. Some part of the public takes her seriously, and her show erodes the respect for basic rights."

In January 2014, she again ignited controversy for her wildly negative depiction of recreational marijuana users. Grace made statements such as users were "fat and lazy" and that anyone who disagreed with her was "lethargic, sitting on the sofa, eating chips" to CNN's news correspondent Brooke Baldwin during a segment covering legalization in Colorado on January 6, 2014.

On October 11, 2016, The Jim Norton and Sam Roberts Show had Grace as a guest, at which time they accused her of capitalizing on others' tragedies for her personal gain. They also addressed her handling of Ultimate Warrior's death, and the Duke lacrosse case. Norton said during the interview that he has disliked her for some time, and noted she had previously blocked him on Twitter. Grace, in defending herself, stated that she was a crime victim herself, and that they didn't ask her one decent question. The next day on The View, Grace addressed the interview, calling Norton and Roberts "Beavis and Butt-Head". Grace said she had to hold back tears during the interview and stated, "I don't really know what it was, but it was hell for me."

==== Elizabeth Smart kidnapping ====
During the 2002 Elizabeth Smart kidnapping case, when suspect Richard Ricci was arrested by police on the basis that he had a criminal record and had worked on the Smarts' home, Grace immediately and repeatedly proclaimed on Court TV and CNN's Larry King Live that Ricci was guilty, although there was little evidence to support this claim. She also suggested publicly that Ricci's girlfriend was involved in the cover-up of his alleged crime. Grace continued to accuse Ricci, who had died while in custody. It was later revealed that Smart was kidnapped by Brian David Mitchell and Wanda Barzee, two individuals with whom Ricci had no connection.

When Court TV confronted Grace seven months later to ask whether she was incorrect in her assertion that Ricci was guilty, and whether or not she felt bad about it in any way, she stated that Ricci was "a known ex-con, a known felon, and brought suspicion on himself, so who could blame anyone for claiming he was the perpetrator?" When Larry King asked her about the matter, she equated criticism of herself with criticism of the police in the case. She said, "I'm not letting you take the police with me on a guilt trip."

In July 2006, Grace interviewed Smart, who was promoting a legislative bill. Grace repeatedly asked her for information regarding her abduction. Smart told her she didn't feel comfortable discussing it, despite Grace's persistence in the matter. Finally, Grace stopped when Smart said she "didn't appreciate [Grace] bringing all this up."

==== Danielle van Dam case ====
During the trial of David Westerfield in 2002 for the kidnap and murder of Danielle van Dam, Grace made it clear on Larry King Live that she thought he was guilty, but she got some facts wrong. For example, she said he had steam-cleaned his RV, but no evidence was introduced that he had. Dr. Henry Lee pointed out that if he had done so, they wouldn't have found the fingerprints and the bloodstain on the carpet. David Westerfield was convicted of kidnapping and murdering Danielle van Dam.

Grace also dismissed the defense's proposal that hair and fibers found on Westerfield's black jacket had been transferred from van Dam to Westerfield when the two were dancing at a bar on Friday night. Grace contended that the jacket was leather and a transfer would not have been possible.

She also made some statements pointing to Westerfield's possible innocence. The strongest evidence against Westerfield was found in his RV, particularly a drop of van Dam's blood and her hand print. That evidence could be innocently explained if, at some previous time while it was parked unlocked in the streets outside her home, van Dam had entered that vehicle, perhaps to explore it out of curiosity. There was no testimony she had done so, but Grace said she "can imagine a little girl wandering into a RV and playing in it, much as if they saw a swimming pool, they might jump in, or a playground, they might play on it".

==== Duke lacrosse allegations ====
Grace took a vehemently pro-prosecution position throughout the 2006 Duke University lacrosse case, in which Crystal Mangum, a stripper and North Carolina Central University student, falsely accused three members of Duke University's men's lacrosse team of raping her at a party. Prior to Duke suspending its men's lacrosse team's season, she sarcastically noted on the air, "I'm so glad they didn't miss a lacrosse game over a little thing like gang rape!" and "Why would you go to a cop in an alleged gang rape case, say, and lie and give misleading information?" After the disbarment of District Attorney Mike Nifong, Attorney General Roy Cooper pronounced all three players innocent of the rape charges made by Mangum and Nifong. On the following broadcast of her show, Grace did not appear and a substitute reporter, Jane Velez-Mitchell, announced the removal of all charges.

==== Suicide of interviewee Melinda Duckett ====
In September 2006, 22-year-old Melinda Duckett committed suicide following an interview conducted by Grace concerning the disappearance of Duckett's 2-year-old son, Trenton. Grace interviewed Duckett less than two weeks after the child went missing, questioning her for her alleged lack of openness regarding her son's disappearance, asking Duckett "Where were you? Why aren't you telling us where you were that day?" Duckett appeared confused and was unable to answer whether or not she had taken a polygraph test. When Grace asked her why she could not account for specific details, Duckett began to reply, "Because I was told not to", to which Grace responded, "Ms. Duckett, you are not telling us for a reason. What is the reason? You refuse to give even the simplest facts of where you were with your son before he went missing. It is day twelve." According to the CNN transcript, Duckett replied, "(INAUDIBLE) with all media. It's not just there, just all media. Period." Grace then moved on to a psychologist who asserted that Duckett was "skirting around the issue."

The next day, before the airing of the show, Duckett shot herself, a death that relatives claim was influenced by media scrutiny, particularly from Grace. Speaking to The Orlando Sentinel, Duckett's grandfather Bill Eubank said, "Nancy Grace and the others, they just bashed her to the end. She was not one anyone ever would have thought of to do something like this." CNN has also been criticized for allowing the show to air in the wake of Duckett's suicide. Police investigating the case had not named Melinda Duckett as a suspect in the case at the time, but after her suicide the police did say that, as nearly all parents are in missing-child cases, she was a suspect from the beginning.

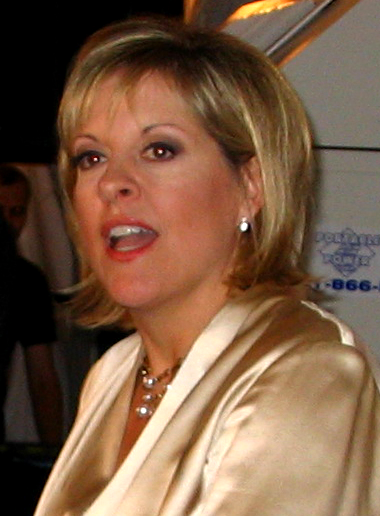
Grace at the book party for her book "Objection!", at the Bryant Park Grill, NYC, 2005

In an interview on Good Morning America, Nancy Grace said in reaction to events that "If anything, I would suggest that guilt made her commit suicide. To suggest that a 15- or 20-minute interview can cause someone to commit suicide is focusing on the wrong thing." She then said that, while she sympathized with the family, she knew from her own experience as a victim of crime that such people look for somebody else to blame.

While describing it as an "extremely sad development", Janine Iamunno, a spokeswoman for Grace, said that her program would continue to follow the case as they had a "responsibility to bring attention to this case in the hopes of helping find Trenton Duckett." Grace commented that "I do not feel that our show is to blame for what happened to Melinda Duckett. The truth is not always nice or polite or easy to go down. Sometimes it's harsh, and it hurts."

On November 21, 2006, The Smoking Gun exposed pending litigation on behalf of the estate of Melinda Duckett, asserting a wrongful death claim against CNN and Grace. The attorney for the estate alleges that, even if Duckett did kill her own son, Grace's aggressive questioning traumatized Duckett so much that she committed suicide. She also argues that CNN's decision to air the interview after Duckett's suicide traumatized her family. Trenton has never been found.

On November 8, 2010, Grace reached a settlement with the estate of Melinda Duckett to create a $200,000 trust fund dedicated to locating Trenton. This settlement was reached a month before a jury trial was scheduled to start. According to the agreement, if the young boy is found alive before he turns 13, the remaining proceeds in the trust will be administered by a trustee – Trenton's great-aunt Kathleen Calvert – until he turns 18 and the funds are transferred for his use. If Trenton is not found by his 13th birthday, or if he is found but is not alive, the funds will be transferred immediately to the National Center for Missing and Exploited Children. "We are pleased the lawsuit has been dismissed. The statement speaks for itself," a spokeswoman for CNN said.

==== Caylee Anthony case ====
From 2008 to 2011, the Caylee Anthony disappearance and the prosecution, trial, and acquittal of her mother Casey Anthony on charges of murder of the child were a regular feature of the Nancy Grace show. She would reveal every new detail of the story. Her program was cited as having "almost single-handedly inflated the Anthony case from a routine local murder into a national obsession".

The Nancy Grace audience more than doubled in the weeks after the start of the Casey Anthony trial. David Carr wrote that Grace took her show to the trial scene in Orlando, Florida, in order to "hurl invective from a close, intimate distance." Grace expressed rage at Anthony's acquittal right after announcement of the verdict, saying: "Tot Mom's lies seem to have worked." In a press conference after the verdicts were read, Cheney Mason, one of Anthony's defense attorneys, blamed the media for a "media assassination" which led to public hatred toward Anthony. He also said,

I can tell you that my colleagues from coast to coast and border to border have condemned this whole process of lawyers getting on television and talking about cases that they don't know a damn thing about, and don't have the experience to back up their words or the law to do it.

Grace took it personally and responded, "What does he care about what pundits are saying?". She also stated that she had as much legal experience as Mason and criticized the defense attorneys for taking on the media before mentioning Caylee Anthony's name in their news conference and stated that "[T]here is no way that this is a verdict that speaks the truth."

Michelle Zierler, director of the Project in Law and Journalism at New York Law School, said Grace "is always certain that the defendant is guilty and needs instant punishment" and this had affected her analysis of the case. Howard Finkelstein, the Broward County, Florida, public defender said,

Nancy Grace should offend every journalist out there. These lawyers on TV during the Anthony trial only offered one side, everybody believed them, and now you've got a big chunk of the population that thinks the legal system let them down. Every time that happens, you lose part of the national community.

On the day Anthony was sentenced on misdemeanor counts of lying to investigators, a supporter held a sign reading: "Nancy Grace, stop trying to ruin innocent lives. The jury has spoken. P.S. Our legal system still works!"

In a televised appearance with media expert Dan Abrams, Grace stated about Anthony's being freed from jail,

No one wishes for vigilante justice; nobody advocates that. People who are opposed to the jury verdict, that think it was wrong, are really seeking justice, and I do not believe those people are interested in harming Tot Mom Casey Anthony.

Abrams commented,

There are too many people out there who love Nancy Grace, who watch Nancy Grace on a regular basis, who are going to see [Anthony] out there somewhere and are going to give her a very, very hard time wherever she goes.

==== Whitney Houston death ====
Mainstream media have suggested that Grace made "wildly speculative" allegations on her program that the investigation into Whitney Houston's death should include the possibility that someone may have been responsible for drowning Houston. Some reporters have pointed out that Grace should have waited for the coroner's report before making this allegation.

==== Toni Annette Medrano suicide ====
On November 22, 2011, Toni Annette Medrano accidentally killed her 3-week-old son, Adrian Alexander Medrano, while she was sleeping on the couch with him. According to the criminal complaint, Medrano told police she had consumed almost an entire fifth of vodka the night before her son died and fell asleep with him on a couch. The following morning, she woke up and found her infant son unresponsive and cold to the touch. While Grace was covering the case, she infamously dubbed Medrano "Vodka Mom". During one of her shows, Grace brought a bottle of vodka onto her set and poured shots to demonstrate how much Medrano had drunk the night of her son's death. On June 6, 2012, Medrano was charged with two counts of second-degree manslaughter.

"The baby is dead because of vodka mommy", Grace said during her June 11 show on HLN. "I don't care if she was driving a car, holding a pistol or holding a fifth of vodka. [It] doesn't matter to me. The baby is dead at the hands of the mommy." During the show, Grace said the charges filed against Medrano weren't harsh enough. "I don't see how this whole thing was an accident and I want murder charges", Grace said.

On July 2, Medrano doused herself in flammable liquid and set herself on fire. She died of her injuries on July 7. After her death, Medrano's husband and the father of her son said he felt the segment Grace did was cruel and added "The things people said were horrible. It shows that cyberbullying happens to adults, too." Following Melinda Duckett's suicide, this was the second suicide to which Grace has been linked. On January 4, 2012, a lawsuit against CNN brought by Medrano's family was settled, "I can tell you the case was settled in principle two weeks ago", said personal injury attorney Michael Padden. A lawsuit was never formally served but "we resolved the case just by negotiation", he said.

==== Amanda Knox ====
Grace commented on the Amanda Knox case: "I was very disturbed, because I think it is a huge miscarriage of justice. I believe that while Amanda Knox did not wield the knife herself, I think that she was there, with her boyfriend, and that he did the deed, and that she egged him on. That's what I think happened... I just happen to know the facts... I'm not trying to get Amanda Knox's first interview because… my show does not pay for interviews... Second, I don't think she's going to tell the truth anyway, so what's the point?"

==== Ultimate Warrior ====
Following WWE Hall of Famer Ultimate Warrior's death on April 8, 2014, Nancy Grace invited retired wrestler Diamond Dallas Page on her show to discuss Warrior. Unbeknownst to Page, the subject of the episode was deaths in the professional wrestling industry caused by steroids. Grace claimed that "rumors of steroid and drug use are swirling" in the case of Ultimate Warrior's death, although an autopsy had concluded that Warrior had died of natural causes with neither drugs nor alcohol in his system at his time of death. During the segment, Grace made several mentions to a list of wrestlers who had died young, linking their deaths to drug abuse. The list included wrestlers whose deaths were unrelated to drug abuse.

After the segment aired, a petition on Change.org requesting that CNN remove Nancy Grace from television received over 10,000 signatures within twenty four hours. #CancelNancyGrace became a trending topic on Twitter following the episode's airing. Page released a statement after the episode aired, stating that he was under the assumption that he would be sharing stories in Warrior's memory and did not know that steroids would be the only topic discussed. WWE subsequently asked past and present WWE talent to not appear on Grace's HLN show. Nancy Grace responded to criticism by telling Radar Online that she would welcome any WWE personalities to come onto her show to "correct all of my misconceptions".

==== Disappearance of Charles Bothuell V ====
During one of her newscasts, Grace interviewed Charles Bothuell IV, informing him, to his surprise, that his son, Charles Bothuell V, had been found in his basement by members of law enforcement.

Bothuell later sued her for defamation claims, but that case was dismissed.

=== Awards ===
Grace has been awarded several American Women in Radio & Television Gracie Awards, has been awarded the "Individual Achievement/Best Program Host" honor by that organization, and has been recognized by many other organizations (including, without limitation, the Carole Sund-Carrington Foundation, Crime Victims United of California and The Retreat) for her advocacy work on behalf of victims’ rights.

== Other television work ==
=== Dancing with the Stars ===
Grace was a contestant on the thirteenth season of Dancing with the Stars, which began airing on September 19, 2011. She was partnered with pro-dancer Tristan MacManus. The couple lasted for 8 weeks and placed 5th overall in the competition before being eliminated on November 8, 2011, one week shy of the semi-finals.

=== Raising Hope ===
In early April 2012, Grace appeared on the last two episodes of the second season of the TV show Raising Hope playing herself.

=== Law & Order: Special Victims Unit ===
On May 22, 2007, Grace appeared in the Law & Order: Special Victims Unit episode "Screwed" the season 8 finale, playing herself opposite Star Jones.

=== Hancock ===
Grace has a cameo appearance in the film Hancock, starring Will Smith.

=== Hollywood Medium with Tyler Henry ===
In June 2017, Grace sat for a reading by purported psychic medium Tyler Henry on his E! TV show, Hollywood Medium with Tyler Henry. Grace believed Henry was communicating with her dead father, as well as murdered fiancé, and said she had received closure. After the reading Grace said "there were many things [Henry] said were impossible for him to have gleaned on the internet or even a computer search, speeches I've given, of things that have happened, I find it difficult to believe … I find many of the things he said to be absolutely amazing." In April 2018, Susan Gerbic analyzed the reading, and detailed in Nancy Grace Should be Ashamed of Herself! exactly how Grace had unfortunately been fooled by the usual fraudulent techniques of cold reading and hot reading used by "grief vampires" like Henry to convince people that they have paranormal powers.

== Further work ==
Grace's first book, Objection!: How High-Priced Defense Attorneys, Celebrity Defendants, and a 24/7 Media Have Hijacked Our Criminal Justice System, was published in 2005 by Hyperion and became a New York Times bestseller. Her first work of fiction, The Eleventh Victim, also published by Hyperion, was released on August 11, 2009. The mystery thriller follows a young psychology student, Hailey Dean, whose fiancé is murdered just weeks before their wedding. She goes on to prosecute violent crime and is forced to reckon with what she left behind. Publishers Weekly described it as "less than compelling"; however, it was also a New York Times bestseller and became the foundation for the Hailey Dean Mysteries series of, thus far, nine movies on the Hallmark Movies & Mysteries channel. A third New York Times bestselling novel, Death on the D-List, was published by Hyperion on August 10, 2010, and followed by Murder in the Courthouse, published by BenBella Books in 2016.

Grace has also helped staff a hotline at an Atlanta battered women's center for 10 years. Since January 10, 2017, Grace hosted a daily Podcast on Crime Online called "Crime Stories with Nancy Grace".

== Personal life ==
=== Marriage and motherhood ===
In April 2007, Grace married David Linch, an Atlanta investment banker, in a small private ceremony. The two had met while she was studying at Mercer University in the 1970s. Grace, who had given up on marriage after the death of her fiancé, said, "We've been in touch all these years, and a lot of time, we were separated by geography and time. It was a spur-of-the-moment decision to get married. I told my family only two days before the wedding."

On June 26, 2007, an emotional Grace announced on her HLN talk show that her life had "taken a U-turn" in that she was pregnant and expecting twins. She gave birth to a daughter and a son.

=== Allegations regarding fiancé's murder ===
In March 2006, an article in the New York Observer suggested that in her book Objection! Grace had embellished the story of her college fiancé's 1979 murder and the ensuing trial to support her image. Grace has described the tragedy as the impetus for her career as a prosecutor and victims' rights advocate, and has often publicly referred to the incident. The Observer researched the murder and found what it submitted to be contradictions between the events and Grace's subsequent statements, including the following:

- Her fiancé, Keith Griffin, was not shot at random by a stranger, but by a former coworker, Tommy McCoy, who blamed him for losing his job
- McCoy was 19, not 24, and did not have a prior criminal record
- Rather than denying the crime, McCoy confessed on the night of the murder (albeit he later pleaded not guilty and went to trial)
- The jury deliberated for a few hours, not days
- According to Grace, the prosecutors had asked her if she wanted them to seek a death sentence, and in a "moment of weakness", she said no. In reality, prosecutors had sought a death sentence, but the jury imposed a life sentence after defense presented a recent psychiatric evaluation showing that McCoy was "mildly retarded".
- There was no ongoing string of appeals (McCoy's family did not want any), albeit McCoy did file a habeas corpus petition for a new trial in 2001, which was rejected.

Grace told the Observer she had not looked into the case in many years and "tried not to think about it." She said she made her previous statements about the case "with the knowledge I had."

In response to Keith Olbermann's claims in a March 2007 Rolling Stone interview in which he was quoted as saying, "Anybody who would embellish the story of their own fiancé's murder should spend that hour a day not on television but in a psychiatrist's chair," Grace stated, "I did not put myself through law school and fight for all those years for victims of crime to waste one minute of my time, my energy, and my education in a war of words with Keith Olbermann, whom I've never met nor had any disagreement. I feel we have X amount of time on Earth, and that when we give in to our detractors or spend needless time on silly fights, I think that's abusing the chance we have to do something good."

Griffin's murderer, Tommy McCoy, received ten years for aggravated assault and life imprisonment for murder, and was released on parole from the Georgia Department of Corrections on December 5, 2006.

== Depictions in popular media ==
=== Law & Order connection ===
The Law & Order programs often base their fictional stories on real-life events and have featured stories based on Grace on several occasions.

In the episode "Haystack" of Law & Order: Special Victims Unit, an overzealous reporter named Cindy Marino (played by Kali Rocha) causes the mother of a kidnapped son to commit suicide. Grace herself appeared in the SVU episode "Screwed".

=== The Newsroom ===
Episode eight of The Newsroom, "The Blackout Part I: Tragedy Porn", features a scene in which the newsroom staff dismantle Grace's coverage of the Caylee Anthony case.

=== Saturday Night Live ===
Sketch comedy show Saturday Night Live has parodied Grace, both in and out of the context of her show, a number of times since her rise to prominence. Originally Grace was portrayed by SNL cast member Amy Poehler. Her impression featured in a parody of the Nancy Grace show during Saturday Night Live's 32nd season (in episode 7). The sketch parodied Grace's reactions to Michael Richards' infamous Laugh Factory appearance, the O. J. Simpson trial and her own parking fines. During the sketch, host Matthew Fox portrays a parking attendant whom Grace's staff have brought off the street, where he was giving Grace a parking ticket. Poehler also voiced Grace, on May 21, 2005, as part of the show's Saturday TV Funhouse segment in a Divertor sketch. During this appearance, Grace says little more than "[Name of celebrity in question] should fry."

Grace would later be impersonated by Saturday Night Live cast member Abby Elliott in the sketch 'So You've Committed A Crime... And You Think You Can Dance?', in which Grace features as a judge of the dance contest. In the sketch, Grace calls the show 'Disgusting'.

Grace was portrayed by featured player Noel Wells in Season 39, Episode 11. The sketch parodies Grace's reaction to the legalization of marijuana in Colorado and features host/musical guest Drake doing an impression of comedian Katt Williams. Much of Grace's dialogue from the sketch was lifted directly from an interview she conducted on January 6, 2013, with Brooke Baldwin on CNN's News Room, in particular the phrase 'I've got a sneaking suspicion that you are pro-pot. And I don't like it.'

Grace was portrayed by Sarah Sherman in the cold open of Season 50, Episode 9.

=== This Hour Has 22 Minutes ===
A recurring sketch on the CBC prime-time sketch comedy series This Hour Has 22 Minutes features Cathy Jones as Betty Hope, an obvious send-up of Grace.

=== Studio 60 on the Sunset Strip ===
During the episode 'Disaster Show' of series Studio 60 on the Sunset Strip, Grace is impersonated by Sarah Paulson as part of a sketch on the titular show within a show. In the episode, Paulson's character, Harriet Hayes, is performing a parody of the Nancy Grace show.Acid Betty

=== Gone Girl ===
It is widely acknowledged, by the media and by Grace herself, that the character of Ellen Abbot in the 2014 film Gone Girl is based on Grace. In an interview with actress Missi Pyle, who played Abbot in the film, Grace told pundits she was "very flattered" and that she "laugh[ed] out loud at it," calling Gone Girl her new favorite portrayal.

=== RuPaul's Drag Race ===
On Season 8 of RuPaul's Drag Race, drag queen Acid Betty portrayed Grace during the episode 5 "Snatch Game" challenge.

== Bibliography ==
- Objection!: How High-Priced Defense Attorneys, Celebrity Defendants, and a 24/7 Media Have Hijacked Our Criminal Justice System. Hyperion. 2005. ISBN 978-1-4013-0180-4.
- The Eleventh Victim. Hyperion. 2009. ISBN 978-1-4013-0345-7.
- Death on the D-List. Hyperion. 2010. ISBN 978-1-4013-2313-4.
- Murder in the Courthouse. BenBella Books. 2016. ISBN 978-1-9429-5288-6.
