= Active ageing =

Active ageing (active aging in the US) is a concept recently deployed by the European Commission, the World Health Organization, and used also in Human Resource Management. This concept evokes the idea of longer activity, with a higher retirement age and working practices adapted to the age of the employee. It also extends to the social engagement of the elderly in the collectivity.

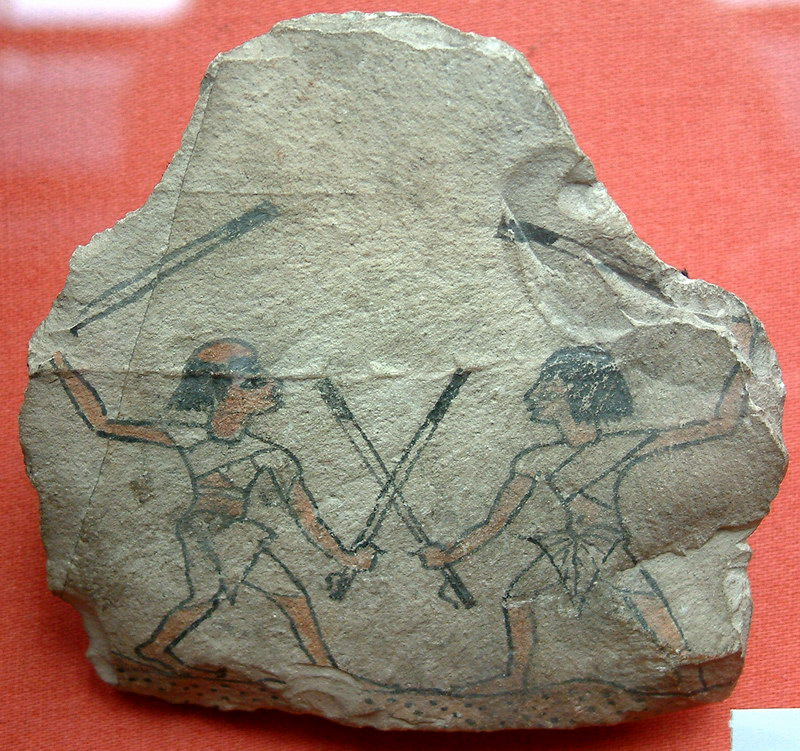
Two men practicing Tahtib, one of them lost his hair, indicating advanced age, on an ostraca from ancient Egypt, Louvre

== Demographic changes ==
Europeans demography shifts towards an elder population with lower birth rates. This will have repercussions on the European economy as less and less active people will support the social costs of health-care and pension of those who stopped working. The EU-Commission has fixed 2 targets for 2010:

1. The Stockholm targets of 2001, which intend to reach 50% higher employment of elder people between 55 and 64.
2. The Barcelona targets of 2002, which intend to progressively augment of 5 years the age of retirement in order to prolong the professional life of elder people.

== Theoretical background ==
The concept of active ageing was originally inspired by the work of Robert Havighurst on activity theory, according to which elders' well-being relies on them staying active in later life; from this point of view, staying active is key to successfully ageing.

== Current understandings ==
At the end of the 20th century organizations such as the OECD and the International Labour Organization used the concept to address the challenges faced by the labour market: lengthening of retirement, maintaining the elderly in employment, etc. In 2002 the World Health Organization (WHO) gave a new twist to the concept by emphasising the prevention of health problems. A number of ICT platforms are in the process of being developed. The concept was then extended to elders being engaged in their communities (e.g. through volunteering) and their family. From this point of view an elder should optimize his or her health in order to benefit his or her own life as much as enrich the collectivity. Critics condemn the normativity of this model as "successfully" ageing in which elders have to stay active and be involved in activities recognized as beneficial without taking into account their heterogeneous life courses.

== See also ==
- Superager
