= Edith Renfrow Smith =

American supercentenarian (1914–2026)

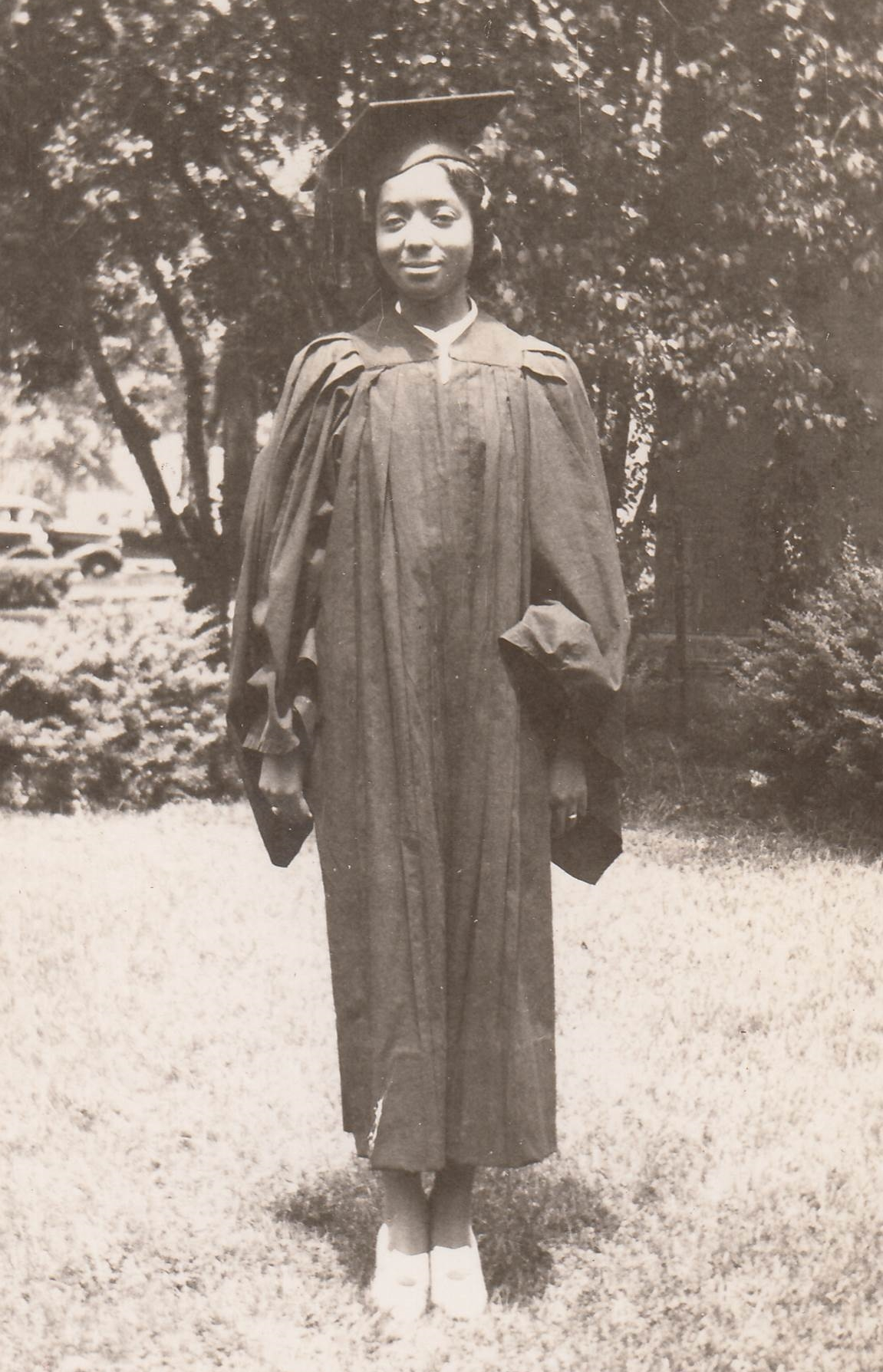
- Renfrow Smith in her cap and gown the day she graduated from Grinnell College in 1937
- Born: Edith Renfrow; July 14, 1914; Grinnell, Iowa, U.S.
- Died: January 2, 2026 (aged 111 years, 172 days); Chicago, Illinois, U.S.
- Spouse: Henry Thomas Smith (m. 1940; died 2013)
- Children: 2

Edith Renfrow Smith (July 14, 1914 – January 2, 2026) was an American supercentenarian and the first African American woman to graduate from Grinnell College. She was a granddaughter of slaves. At age 108, she was designated a "superager" in a study by Northwestern University for her remarkable memory and longevity. In 2019, at the age of 105, she was awarded an honorary doctorate in humane letters from Grinnell College. In 2022, Grinnell College announced it would name a new residence hall in her honor. Renfrow Hall opened in the fall of 2024.

== Early life and family history ==
Born on July 14, 1914, Edith Renfrow was the fifth of six children born to Eva Pearl Craig and Lee Augustus Renfrow. The Renfrows were one of the few African American families in the community of Grinnell, a small rural town in central Iowa. Both Eva Craig and Lee Renfrow's parents had been enslaved and were born into slavery. Lee's father, Perry Renfrow, was born into slavery in North Carolina. His mother, Eliza (sometimes Alice) Anderson, was born in The Gambia and brought to the Americas as a slave.

=== NAACP article in The Crisis ===
The story of Renfrow's maternal grandmother, Eliza Jane, was told in a 1937 article in the NAACP publication The Crisis, entitled "Up from Slavery", written at the time of Renfrow's graduation from Grinnell College by Milton Wittler. Eva tells the story of her grandmother, a slave girl, and the French man who fell in love with her when she was his slave. Eva is quoted as saying, "[he] made her mistress of his house, treating her with honor and affection. When children came he accepted them as his own and gave them every advantage, even planning for their complete education by a clause in his will." She tells the story of her grandparents sending their children north at the time their father grew ill, making arrangements to pay for their lodging and schooling. When he urged his wife to go with them, she refused to leave. Eva continued the story by telling of how her grandmother was forced back into slavery: "For on the death of her master, his brothers, who had no patience with his ideas, burned my grandmother's writ of freedom before her eyes and forced her back into slavery, dividing their brother's estate among themselves."

The article tells how their youngest child, Eliza Jane, was raised by Quakers in Ohio and later Iowa, where she met and married George Craig. Their daughter, Eva Pearl Craig, would marry Lee Augustus Renfrow and raise the six Renfrow children in Grinnell.

=== Siblings ===
Renfrow's eldest sibling, Helen Renfrow Lemme, became a celebrated educator and civil rights advocate in Iowa City, Iowa. The Helen Lemme Elementary School in Iowa City is named in her honor. She is also among those listed on the Grinnell High School Alumni Hall of Fame.

Alice Renfrow attended Hampton University and went on to a career at the Library of Congress.

Rudolph Renfrow graduated as valedictorian of his class at Hampton and was a part of the New Negro Alliance in Washington, D.C. in the 1930s.

Evanel Renfrow received a bachelor's degree and master's degree in nutrition from the University of Iowa. She became a professor at Savannah State University.

The youngest, Paul Renfrow, served in the US Army during World War II and was part of the D-Day invasion, reaching the rank of Master Sergeant before his discharge. He attended optician school and practiced in Washington, D.C.

== Education ==
Education was a priority in the Renfrow family, and all the children attended college and later had careers. Like most of her siblings, Edith Renfrow completed her public school education in Grinnell. She was the only one to stay in town and attend Grinnell College. She graduated in 1937 with a major in psychology and a minor in economics. She was the first African American woman to graduate from Grinnell College.

A student during the Depression, she worked a number of campus jobs and lived and ate her meals at home to save money. Despite the living arrangement, she was able to participate in the campus community. In a 2007 article in the Grinnell Magazine, she is quoted as saying "That was a wonderful experience. I was just part of the group, and I enjoyed all the group activities that we had at Grinnell." She attended dances and dinners along with the other female students. She also played sports, including basketball and field hockey.

== Career ==
After college, Renfrow moved to Chicago in search of work. There she worked at the YWCA and later the University of Chicago. She met her husband, Henry T. Smith, in Chicago, and they married in 1940. She earned her teaching license and taught in the Chicago school system for 21 years. She was a member of the Black Educator Hall of Fame. After retirement in 1976, she started to volunteer regularly at Goodwill and the Art Institute of Chicago, something she continued into her nineties.

== Later life and honors ==
In 2009, at the age of 94, Renfrow Smith was admitted to the Chicago Senior Citizen Hall of Fame and was the 2009 Luminary Award Recipient for her many years of community involvement. Due to her remarkable vitality and memory, at the age of 99, she was selected to be a part of a "superager" study being conducted by Northwestern University. To qualify as a "superager", a person must be "age 80 or older with memory performance equal to or even better than healthy people in their 50s and 60s. To qualify, an individual must pass a rigorous set of memory tests, ones so tough that less than 10 percent of people who believe they could be a SuperAger actually qualify." In 2018, Renfrow Smith appeared on the Today Show as a part of their series on superagers. In 2021, she appeared in a PBS produced piece entitled "Build a Better Memory through Science" that broadcast on some stations and is available to stream online.

In 2019, at age 104, Renfrow Smith received an honorary doctorate in humane letters from Grinnell College. Earlier that year the Edith Renfrow Smith Black Women's Library was opened in the Grinnell College Black Cultural Center. In 2006, the Smith Gallery in the Joe Rosenfield Campus Center at Grinnell College was named in her honor.

The Chicago Sun-Times did a two-part feature on Renfrow Smith when she turned 107 in July 2021. They did another piece on her when she turned 108.

In 2022, Grinnell College announced their new Civic Engagement Quad residential hall building would be named Renfrow Hall in honor of Renfrow Smith.

Renfrow Smith was featured in a piece, "She was an education pioneer. At 108, Edith Renfrow Smith shares her life lessons," on the NBC News website in February 2023.

She was featured in an NPR Weekend Edition interview with Scott Simon, "Meet the woman who has witnessed over 100 years of Black history in Chicago," broadcast on Feb. 11, 2023.

In April 2023, the Grinnell Chapter Daughters of the American Revolution honored Edith Renfrow Smith with the DAR's Women in American History award. The award acknowledges outstanding contributions of women who have made a contribution or a difference in their communities.

On her 109th birthday on July 14, 2023, she was featured in both the Chicago Sun-Times and on WGN Channel 9.

In January 2024, an illustrated biography of her life was published: No One is Better than You: Edith Renfrow Smith and the Power of a Mother's Words.

On March 26, 2024, she was interviewed online for "The Conversation with Al McFarlane," for Insight News. She was the cover story for the April 8, 2024 print edition of Insight News of Minneapolis, Minnesota. This edition featured three articles about her life.

For her 110th birthday, she was featured in an article in the Chicago Sun Times.

On September 21, 2024, at the age of 110, she was inducted into the Iowa African American Hall of Fame.

On September 28, 2024, she was present with family as Renfrow Hall was named in her honor at Grinnell College.

In celebration of her 111th birthday, she was once again interviewed by the Chicago Sun-Times, and was also featured in a piece by the University of Chicago Medicine as the oldest participant in their SuperAging Research Initiative.

On January 6, 2026, NPR published her obituary a few days after her death.

== Personal life ==
While in Chicago she met Henry T. Smith and married him on May 25, 1940 in the Renfrow home in Grinnell. They had two daughters, Virginia and Alice. Renfrow Smith died on January 2, 2026, at the age of 111 years and 172 days.
