= Alan Dysert =

American actor (1951–2026)

- Dysert in 1980
- Born: June 12, 1951; Illinois, U.S.
- Died: October 23, 2026 (aged 75)
- Education: University of Illinois Urbana-Champaign
- Occupation: Actor
- Years active: 1978–2026
- Spouse: Michele Dysert (m. 2008)
- Children: 2

Alan Dysert (June 12, 1951 – October 23, 2026) was an American actor. His career began in 1978 with an uncredited role on the ABC sitcom Soap. Dysert also portrayed Sean Cudahy on the soap opera All My Children from 1980 to 1981, and again from 1988 to 1990.

== Early life and career ==
Dysert was born in Illinois on June 12, 1951, the son of Marion Dysert. He was raised on a farm in Oakwood, Illinois. He graduated from Oakwood High School as the valedictorian of his class. After graduating, he attended the University of Illinois Urbana-Champaign from 1969 to 1973, and operated his own real estate business. He studied acting at San Francisco State University and the University of California, Los Angeles, and performed stand-up comedy. He began his screen career in 1978, playing an uncredited role in an episode of the ABC sitcom television series Soap.

Later in his career, Dysert portrayed Sean Cudahy, the villainous con man and the brother of Tom Cudahy (Richard Shoberg) on the ABC soap opera All My Children, from 1980 to 1981, and again from 1988 to 1990. He appeared in films such as Cheech and Chong's Next Movie, The Senator, Two Weeks and The Grift. In 2023, he wrote the memoir Lights, Camera, Cancer!, and in 2026, he last appeared in the civil war film The Legend of Van Dorn.

== Personal life and death ==
In 2008, Dysert married Michele. He had two sons from a previous relationship.

In his 2023 memoir, Dysert revealed that he was diagnosed with cancer. He died on October 23, 2026, at the age of 75.
