= Meinders School of Business =

Business school of Oklahoma City University

Coordinates: 35°29′47″N 97°32′16″W

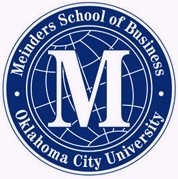
- Type: Private
- Established: 1907
- Affiliations: Oklahoma City University
- Dean: Nic Erhardt
- Faculty: 20 full-time faculty members
- Undergraduates: 150
- Postgraduates: 350
- Location: Oklahoma City, Oklahoma, US
- Campus: Urban
- Website: Meinders School of Business

The Meinders School of Business is the business school of Oklahoma City University, a private university in Oklahoma City, Oklahoma. It offers courses for undergraduate, graduate, professional development, and continuing education students and undergraduate and graduate degrees in most business majors of study. The Meinders School of Business achieved initial accreditation from Association to Advance Collegiate Schools of Business International in 2014. The Meinders School of Business' Energy Programs were the first graduate programs accredited by the American Association of Professional Landmen in 2013.

== Undergraduate programs ==
Bachelor of Business Administration (B.B.A.) in:

- Accounting
- Business Administration
- Data Analytics
- Economics
- Finance
- Finance, Banking & Real Estate
- Marketing
- Supply Chain Management

== Graduate Degrees ==
- Master of Business Administration (M.B.A)

Corporate Accounting Data Analytics Energy Financial Analytics Health Care Administration Leadership Management Information Systems (MIS)

- Master of Science in Accounting (M.S.A.)

Accounting Applied Artificial Intelligence (AI) & Machine Learning Data Analytics Management Information Systems (MIS)

=== Energy Programs ===
Meinders School of Business offers graduate programs in Energy Management and Energy Legal Studies The programs are the only graduate programs accredited by the AAPL.

Energy Management concentrates on the core business elements of the energy industry.

== Facilities ==
Herman Meinders, a university trustee and longtime benefactor of the university, provided OCU $18 million to build a new home for its business school. Completed in 2003, the 80,000-square-foot building serves as a learning and technology hub for the school.

In addition to classroom and office space, the three-story facility includes a 2,500-square-foot auditorium capable of hosting business conferences, a computer lab, a student/faculty lounge to facilitate collaboration and mentoring, and breakout rooms for small-group meetings. Business students have access to an on-site learning center where they can videotape then review mock interviews and presentations, as well as a career center.

The Executive MBA program was previously offered in Kuala Lumpur; Thailand; Singapore and Tianjin, China. In Tianjin, the MBA program was conducted in collaboration with the Tianjin University of Finance and Economics (TUFE).

== Institutes and Centers ==
- Economic Research and Policy Institute which provides economic impact reports, and policy analysis, for the state and organizations such as the Cherokee Nation.
- Loves Entrepreneurship Center which assists students and entrepreneurs with creating and starting their own companies, helping write a business plan as well as seek funding.
- Meinders School of Business is committed to engagement, innovation, and impact. To wit, it regularly hosts events and conferences including its annual energy conference and most recently a conference focused on development of natural gas in Tanzania.
