= Swift Justice with Jackie Glass =

American reality court show (2010–2012)

- Genre: Arbitration-based reality court show
- Starring: Nancy Grace; Jackie Glass
- Theme music composer: Michael Cuneo (2010–2011); Michael Egizi (2011–2012)
- Country of origin: United States
- No. of seasons: 2

Production
- Production locations: Georgia Public Broadcasting studios; Atlanta, Georgia (2010–2011); Sunset Bronson Studios; Hollywood, California (2011–2012)
- Running time: 30 minutes (including commercials)
- Production companies: Swift Justice Productions, Inc. (season 1); Georgia Entertainment Industries (season 1); Big Ticket Television (season 2)

Original release
- Network: Syndication
- Release: September 13, 2010 – April 25, 2012

Swift Justice with Jackie Glass (also known simply as Swift Justice and previously known as Swift Justice with Nancy Grace) is an American arbitration-based reality court show that was first hosted by HLN host and former Fulton County, Georgia prosecutor Nancy Grace for the first season, followed by former Nevada Eighth District Court/Clark County Judge Jackie Glass for the second and final season. It aired from September 13, 2010, to April 25, 2012. Syndicated by CBS Television Distribution, the program featured the traditional court show format of small claims court cases argued in the forum of binding arbitration.

== Synopsis ==
Swift Justice had a different format from other court shows such as Judge Judy, Judge Mathis, Divorce Court, and Judge Joe Brown.

In the first season when Nancy Grace was the adjudicator, the usual "panel/seal/bench" setting of a traditional court show was not used, as the show used a more modern setting, including an open lectern where Grace stood rather than sat, a large projection display in the studio, and a set mainly fitted with brightly colored backgrounds, with no bar separating the audience gallery (who sat in the round along the edges of the set) from the litigants.

In the first season, the program used elements to allow one side or the other to prove their case such as handwriting and blood spatter exams. Two of the other elements used on Swift Justice, DNA tests and lie detector tests, were used on tabloid talk shows such as The Steve Wilkos Show and Maury.

== Broadcast and production ==
Like most court shows, Swift Justice aired on TV stations affiliated with FOX, MyNetworkTV, the CW, and scattered on ABC, NBC, and CBS affiliates in smaller markets.

In the first season, the program was shot at the studios of Georgia Public Broadcasting (GPB) in Atlanta to accommodate Grace wanting to stay in the Atlanta area, and CBS received subsidies from the Georgia Film, Music & Digital Entertainment Office to do so; both GPB and the Georgia Film Office received end credits for their assistance in the program. In May 2011, however, the program began to film instead at Sunset Bronson Studios in Hollywood, California, forcing Grace to commute to Los Angeles for cases.

On May 24, 2011, it was announced that Jackie Glass, known for presiding over the O. J. Simpson robbery case in Las Vegas, would replace Grace on Swift Justice, and the show would move production to Los Angeles. Grace told the New York Post that family obligations were the deciding factor in her departure. In the course of the move, the program came under the production authority of Big Ticket Television, which produces Judge Judy and Judge Joe Brown, and was reduced from being transmitted in high definition to being filmed in standard definition and became a more traditional court show, likely as filming took place in the same studio as the latter programs with a different set; those shows had not yet switched to HD for that season. Another element of the program, which used Polycom and Skype video from litigants' homes to adjudicate some cases via webcam to reduce travel costs, was also dropped for the second season.

Swift Justice was cancelled due to low ratings near the end of the second season. The final original episode aired on April 25, 2012, with repeats continuing until September 2012.

Swift Justice with Nancy Grace was available on the free streaming service, Pluto TV, from March 2021 to March 2023. And until 2023, Swift Justice with Nancy Grace also aired on Ion Mystery.

Jackie Glass, the show's final host, died on August 28, 2026, at the age of 70.
