= Dee Freeman =

American actress (1959–2026)

- Born: Dolores Freeman; June 6, 1959; Louisiana, U.S.
- Died: April 2, 2026 (aged 66)
- Occupation: Actress
- Years active: 1995–2026
- Children: 2

Dolores “Dee” Freeman (June 6, 1959 – April 2, 2026) was an American actress of stage and screen.

== Life and career ==
Freeman was born in Louisiana on June 6, 1959. She served in United States Marine Corps for six years before making her debut in 1995 in the ABC sitcom Coach. She was known for appearing in episodes of The Young and the Restless, Seinfeld, Dexter and Sistas. She also starred in Pretty the Series from 2010 to 2015 and Reasonable Doubt (2022).

She performed in over 80 stage productions and was adapting her one-woman show Poison Gun, at the time of her death. The novel was drawn from her own family history.

Freeman died from lung cancer on April 2, 2026, at the age of 66. She is survived by two children, Amber and Shane.
