= Superager =

Octogenarian who is cognitively much younger

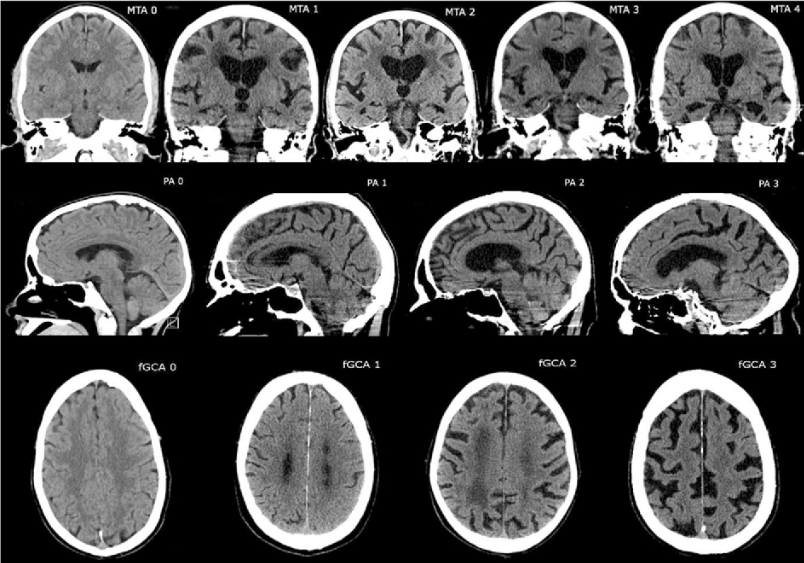
Computer tomographies of medial temporal lobe, posterior atrophy and frontal cortical atrophy. Superagers usually show less cortical atrophy.

A superager (also super-ager) is a person of advanced biological age (80 years or older) who retains the cognitive performance of a much younger person. The term was coined by the neurologist Marsel Mesulam. Individuals of this range of age who show normal performance are called "typical-agers" to differentiate them from superagers.

== Cause ==
A study by Mohammadiarvejeh et al. suggests that optimal cognitive aging may not be strictly related to age, but to biological factors due to lifestyle or pharmacological changes. Superaging would be an example of successful ageing, also called active ageing. On the contrary, Milman et al. state that exceptional longevity is strongly influenced by genetics, and comparisons of lifestyle habits do not show significant differences between super-agers and typical-agers. Pascual et al. measured telomeres of 57 superagers and 48 typical-agers. Superagers had significantly shorter telomeres.

== Epidemiology ==
Superaging is more common in females. Men and women who are superagers have less dementia risk. In the same way, having fewer modifiable dementia risk factors may be positively associated with superager status, which suggests ways to, at some extent, prevent dementia.

In 2012, Harrison and colleagues began the systematic study of individuals in their 80s with episodic memory comparable to people 20 to 30 years younger. The first group was named "superagers". This condition has since been associated with greater regional cerebral volumes, slower rate of cortical atrophy, less pathological burden associated with Alzheimer's disease, and genetic mutations in memory signaling pathways. The Rey Auditory Verbal Learning Test (RAVLT) is the most usual tool used to spot superagers.

== Prevention factors ==
In a 2021 study of 1,679 people, females superagers had higher education, more units of weekly alcohol intake, and more participation in cognitively engaging activities relative to typical-agers. In males, superagers also had higher education, but reported more social activities per week and less depressive symptoms.

Superagers engage more in social interactions. Factors such as body mass index, diabetes, hypertension, dyslipidemia, and smoking status were not found significant.

== See also ==
- Active ageing
- Supercentenarian
