= Sunset Las Palmas Studios =

Independent filming lot in Hollywood

Coordinates: 34.089777°N 118.334722°W

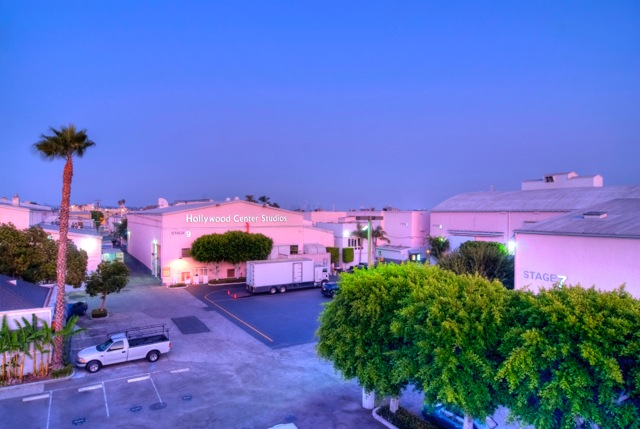
- Formerly: General Service Studios; Hollywood Center Studios
- Company type: Incentive
- Industry: Entertainment
- Founded: 1919
- Headquarters: 1040 North Las Palmas Avenue; Hollywood, California; 90038
- Products: Filmmaking; Television production; Advertising
- Parent: Sunset Studios (Hudson Pacific Properties)
- Website: Official website

Sunset Las Palmas Studios, formerly General Service Studios and Hollywood Center Studios, is an American independent entertainment production lot located at 1040 North Las Palmas Avenue in the Hollywood neighborhood of Los Angeles. It has stage facilities and provides filmmaking services to clients in the film, television and advertising industries. Founded in 1919, it is one of the oldest production facilities in Hollywood and has been the host of many notable motion picture productions for over a century.

Sunset Las Palmas Studios is one of the three production facilities which make up the "Sunset Studios" sound-stage conglomerate owned by Hudson Pacific Properties. The other two are the Sunset Bronson Studios and the Sunset Gower Studios.

== History ==
In 1919 John Jasper, a former associate of Charlie Chaplin, built exterior sets, three production stages, and several bungalows on a 16.5-acre site in Hollywood; he named it Hollywood Studios Inc. The first stages resembled hot houses with steel frames, cloth walls, glass roofs, and clerestory windows. Outdoor sets included an "Americana" residential street, a massive New York street, and an elegant Spanish villa. Among the first tenants was comedian Harold Lloyd who produced some of his most successful films on the lot.

The lot changed ownership and name several times during its early years continuing to evolve and grow. In 1926, Metropolitan Studios began construction of one of the industry's first sound stages. A few years later, Howard Hughes moved production to the lot used and shot the World War I epic Hell's Angels (1930), known for its innovative use of sound and for the screen debut of Jean Harlow.

Dozens of films were produced on the lot during the 1930s and 1940s including the Mae West vehicles Klondike Annie and Go West, Young Man (both 1936); the 21-picture Hopalong Cassidy series, the Bing Crosby classic Pennies from Heaven (1936), and the Marx Brothers’ A Night in Casablanca (1946). Douglas Fairbanks Jr.; Stan Laurel and Oliver Hardy; Fred Astaire, Cary Grant, Glenn Ford, Fredric March, and Erich von Stroheim were among the stars who worked on the lot in the pre-World War II years. James Cagney made several films on the lot while his brother William was a part owner.

With the advent of television production on the lot changed dramatically. In 1951, the lot made history when Stage 2 became home to I Love Lucy, the first prime-time comedy shot on film and produced before a live audience originating from the West Coast.

From 1951 to 1953, it was the home of Desilu Productions, owned by Lucille Ball and her husband Desi Arnaz. The television version of actress Eve Arden's radio series Our Miss Brooks produced its first season on the stage adjacent to I Love Lucy. Both stages were known as the Desilu Playhouse seeing that a common entrance had been created at the rear of each sound stage. After the second season of I Love Lucy, Desilu moved to what is now Red Studios Hollywood. Our Miss Brooks and other Desilu produced and filmed series moved with them.

The floodgates soon opened and the lot became the center of television's Golden Age. In the 1950s, General Service was the home of George Burns's McCadden Corporation (The Burns and Allen Show, The Bob Cummings Show, Panic, and The People's Choice); Ozzie Nelson's Stage Five Productions (The Adventures of Ozzie and Harriet) and Jack Chertok Productions (Private Secretary). It later hosted a number of classic CBS comedies including Petticoat Junction, Green Acres and The Beverly Hillbillies. The Lone Ranger, Perry Mason, Mr. Ed, The Addams Family and Get Smart were also produced on the lot. George Burns maintained his office on the lot until his death.

In 1980, director Francis Ford Coppola purchased the lot, naming it Zoetrope Studios; he intended to use it to produce a slate of films. Among them was the ambitious movie musical One from the Heart. For the film, Coppola transformed the entire lot into a giant set that included a replica of part of Las Vegas’ McCarran Airport. During this time Mel Brooks's Brooksfilms also rented a stage on the lot to film Frances, starring Jessica Lange. Cost overruns on One From the Heart combined with its poor box-office performance caused Coppola to fall into financial difficulties and the lot was sold again, this time to Canadian real estate developers, the Singer Family.

In 1984, The Jacksons used this lot to rehearse for the Victory Tour.

The Singers initiated a comprehensive modernization and refurbishing effort that sparked a revival of the lot's fortunes and attracted a new generation of feature film and commercial filmmakers. The Singers also returned television production to the lot by adding control rooms and the infrastructure required for multi-camera video production. The lot again was the home to some of the country's most popular shows including Jeopardy! (seasons 2–10), Star Search, Soul Train, The Man Show, and Pee-wee's Playhouse.

In a multimillion-dollar investment, the lot's control rooms, camera packages, and infrastructure were upgraded to HDTV. It was done to support television clients such as Disney Channel, which produced a number of original series under the It's a Laugh Productions banner for Disney Channel and Disney XD on the lot. Three cyc stages were added, one dedicated to green screen production. A virtual set stage was also built.

In May 2017, a Los Angeles–based real estate company, Hudson Pacific Properties Inc., purchased Hollywood Center Studios from the Singer family for $200 million and then immediately renamed the property as the "Sunset Las Palmas Studios."

In June 2025, it was announced that the CBS soap opera The Bold and the Beautiful would move to Sunset Las Palmas Studios after its summer production hiatus, after 38 years of production at Television City.
