= Columbus Tower (San Francisco) =

Sentinel Building
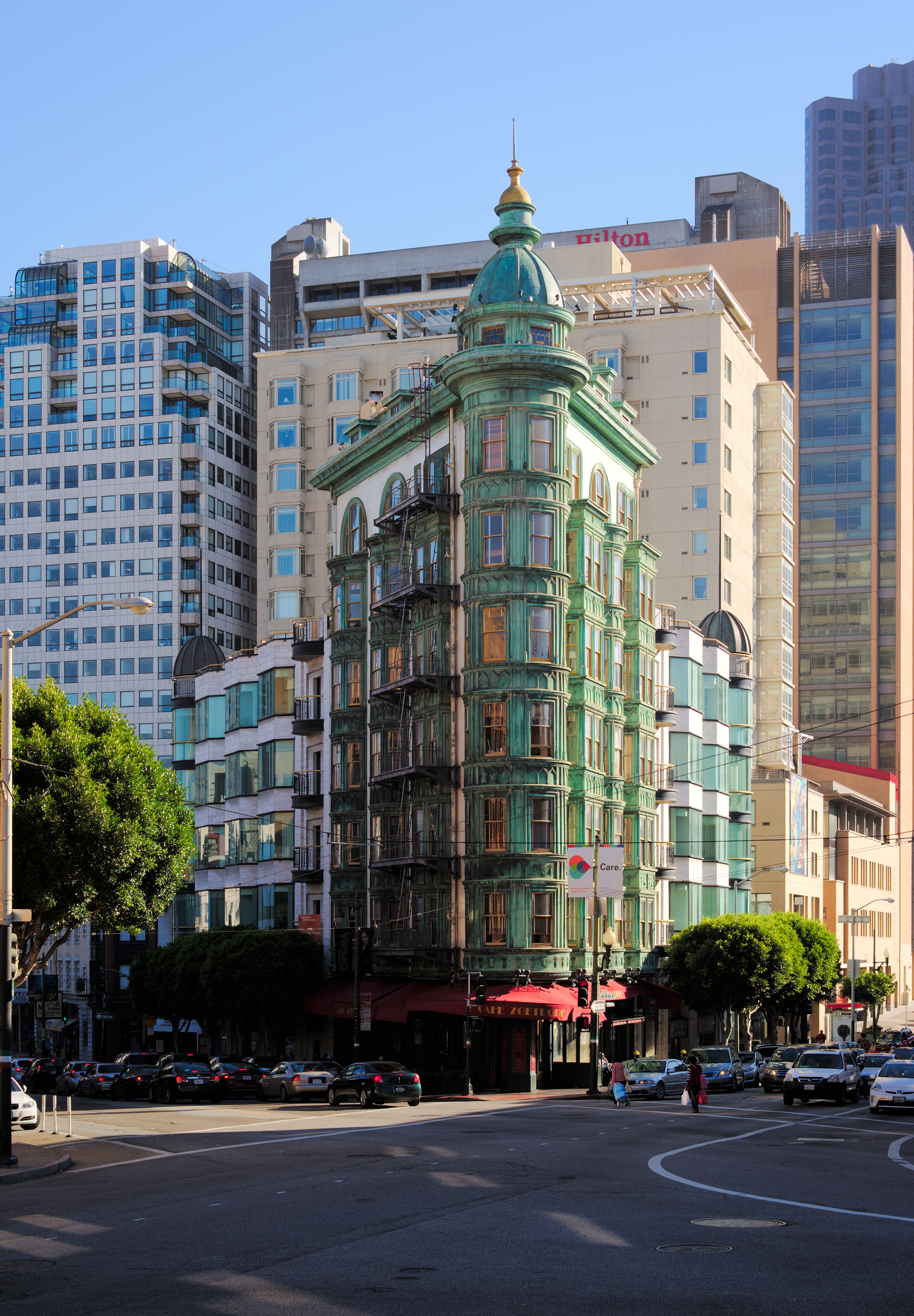
- A view of the Sentinel Building

- Location within San Francisco County Columbus Tower (California) Columbus Tower (the United States)
- Alternative names: Columbus Tower; Flatiron Building

General information
- Type: Mixed-used
- Location: 916 Kearny Street; San Francisco, California
- Coordinates: 37.7964°N 122.4049°W
- Completed: 1907
- Owner: Francis Ford Coppola

Technical details
- Floor count: 8
- Floor area: 22,700 sq ft (2,110 m^{2})

Design and construction
- Architects: Salfield & Kohlberg
- Developer: Abe Ruef

San Francisco Designated Landmark
- Designated: 1970
- Reference no.: 33

The Sentinel Building, also briefly known as Columbus Tower between 1958-1972, is a mixed-use building in San Francisco, California, completed in 1907. The distinctive copper-green Flatiron style structure is bounded by Columbus Avenue, Kearny Street, and Jackson Street; straddling the North Beach, Chinatown, and Financial District neighborhoods of the city. Much of the building is occupied by film studio American Zoetrope, and the ground floor houses a cafe named after the company. The Sentinel Building is listed as San Francisco Designated Landmark No. 33.

== History ==
The building was designed by the architecture firm Salfield and Kohlberg, named for architects David Salfield and Hermann Kohlberg.

Despite the 1907 finish, building work had begun before the San Francisco earthquake the previous year, but extensive damage to the building site, and the rest of the city, slowed down the construction considerably.

The top floor initially housed the headquarters of the notorious Abe Ruef, a local political figure at the time.

In 1949 or 1950, the nightclub hungry i, which would become very influential in the history of stand-up comedy in the US, was opened as an 83-seat venue in the Sentinel Building's basement by Eric Nord, who sold it to Enrico Banducci in 1951. After operating it as a venue for folk singers including Stan Wilson, Banducci began hiring comedians in 1953 with Mort Sahl, encouraging them to express themselves freely. Their success caused queues around the block, until Banducci moved the hungry i to the nearby International Hotel on Jackson Street in 1954.

In 1958, when the Sentinel Building's state had deteriorated and it was threatened with destruction, it was bought by Dutch-born investor Rob Moor and his wife Nella, who renovated it, renamed it to "Columbus Tower", and sold it one and a half years later at a profit to The Kingston Trio. The music group used it as their corporate headquarters during the 1960s. They built a recording studio in the basement which they used themselves and for many other artists including the We Five.

The Kingston Trio later sold the building to film director Francis Ford Coppola, who renovated it and changed its name back to the Sentinel Building. American Zoetrope, the film studio he co-founded with George Lucas, moved into the building in 1972 and remains there as of 2016.

== Tenants ==
Currently occupying much of the tower is Francis Ford Coppola's American Zoetrope studio.

Other tenants include independent public media producers for NPR and PBS, as well as independent sound designers for Pixar and Skywalker Sound, among others.

On the ground floor is the Cafe Zoetrope (previously Cafe Niebaum-Coppola), which has occupied part of the building since 1999. The café is a bistro and wine shop satellite of the Inglenook Estate Winery in the Napa Valley.

== Popular culture ==
The Sentinel Building can be seen in Star Trek IV: The Voyage Home when James T. Kirk and his crew are first walking through San Francisco after arriving in 1986.

== Gallery ==
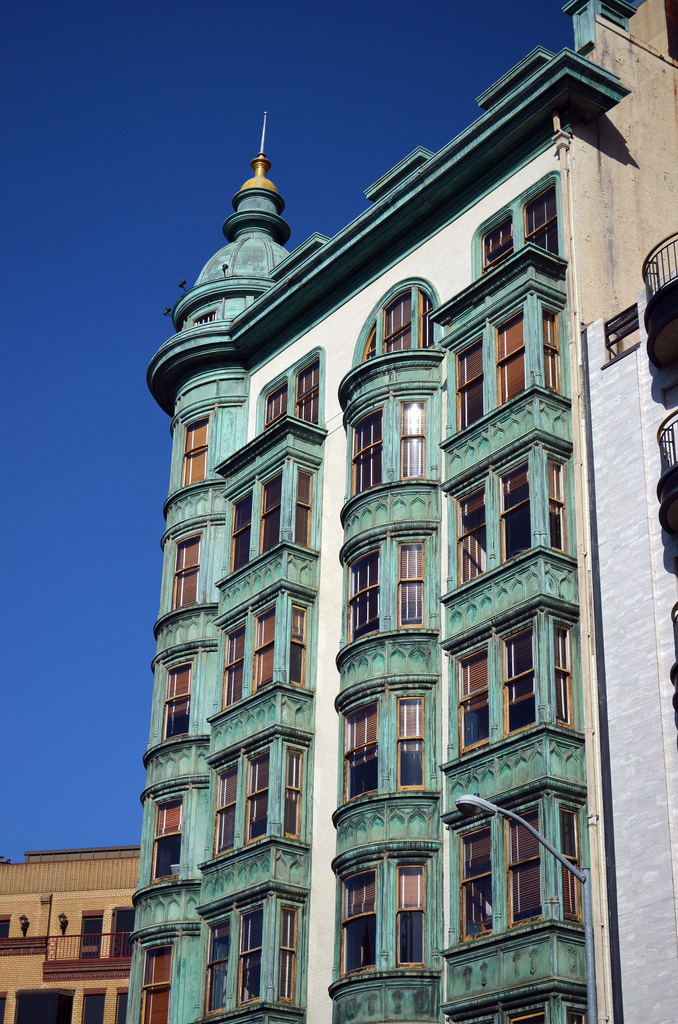
Side of Columbus Tower

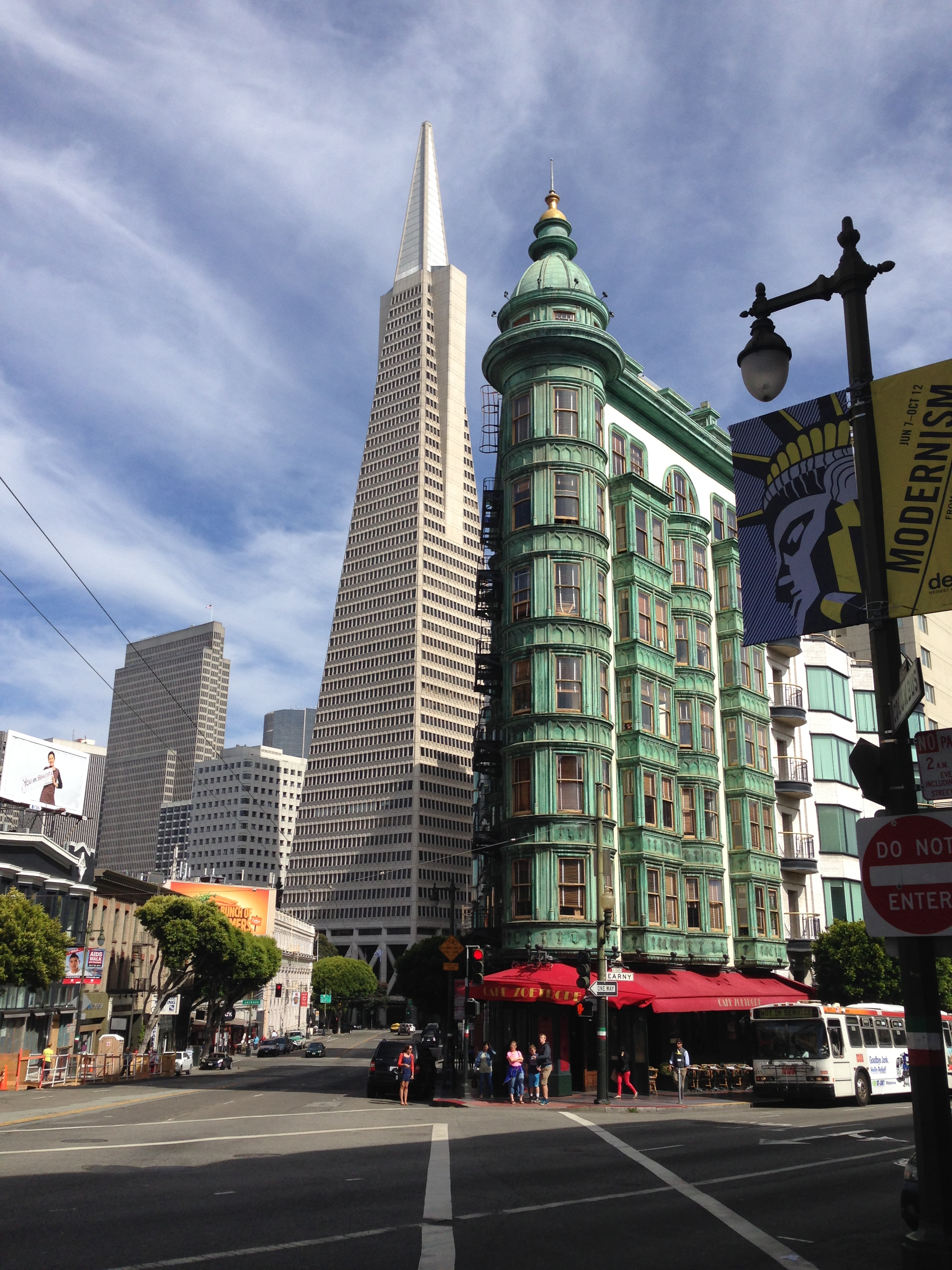
Columbus Tower with Transamerica Pyramid in background

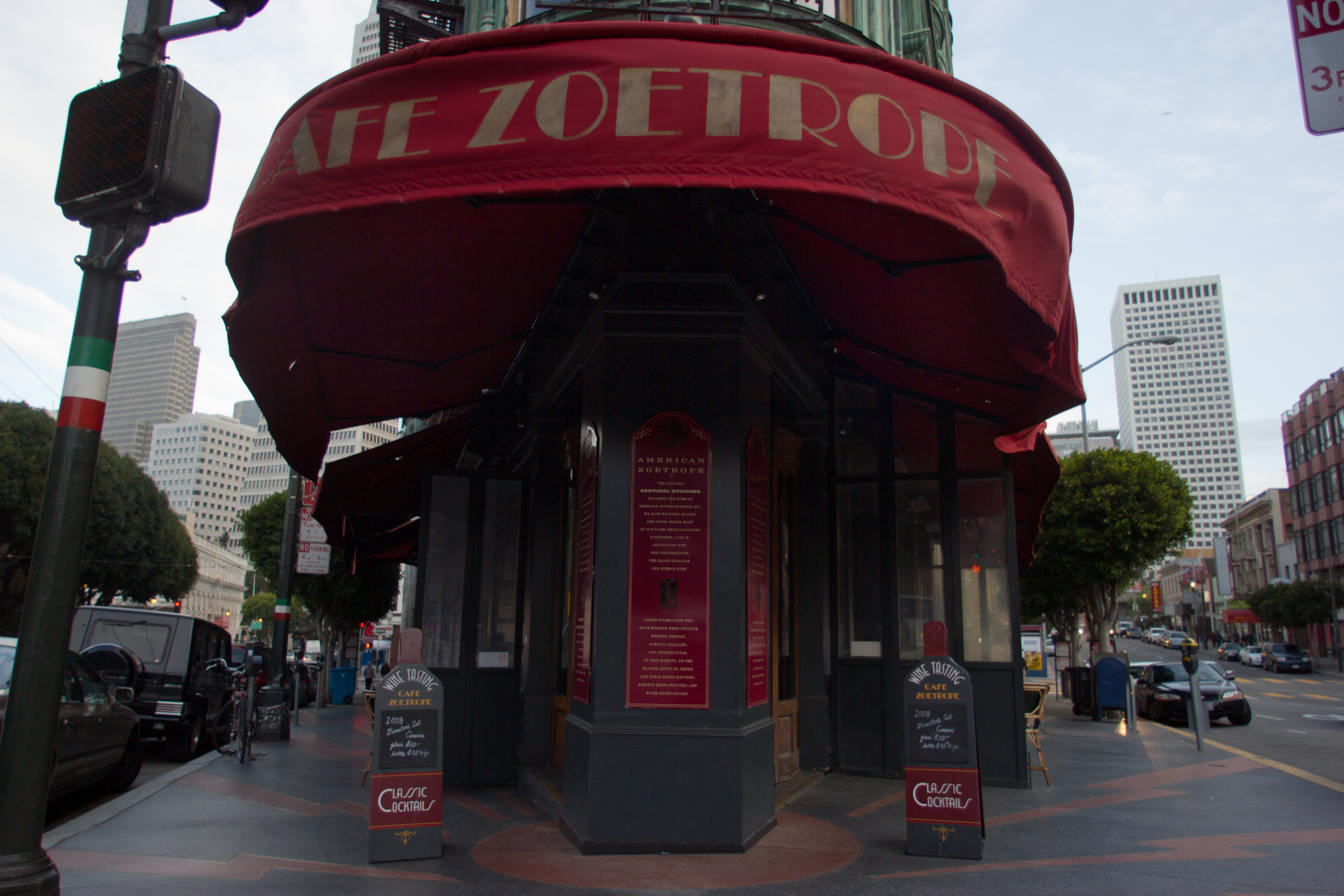
Cafe Zoetrope basement entrance at ground level of the building

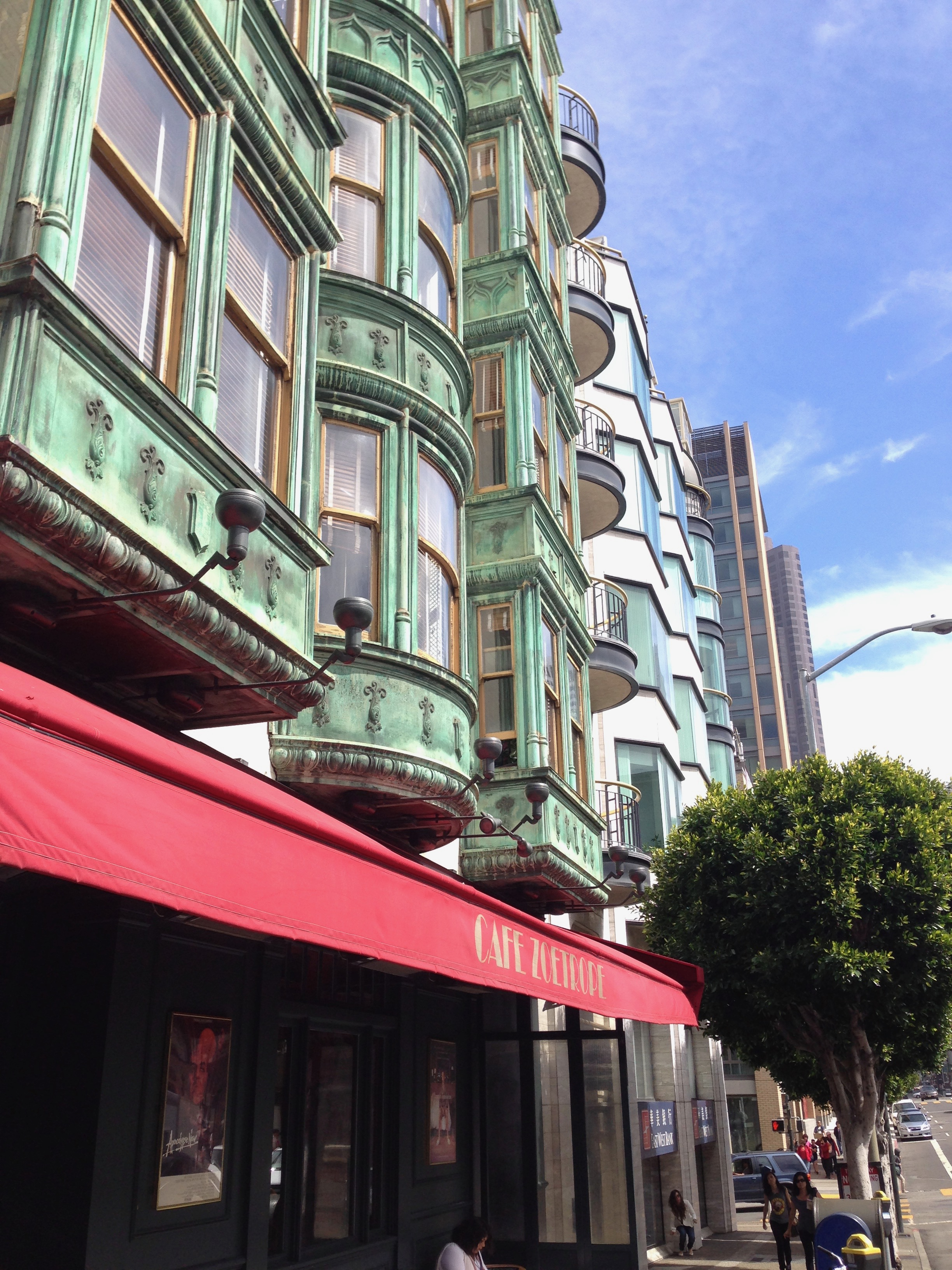
Cafe Zoetrope awning and posters for Apocalypse Now and Lost in Translation

== See also ==
- List of San Francisco Designated Landmarks
