= Love Is Love Is Love (film) =

2020 American drama films

- Theatrical release poster
- Directed by: Eleanor Coppola
- Written by: Eleanor Coppola; Karen Leigh Hopkins
- Produced by: Anahid Nazarian; Adriana Rotaru
- Starring: Joanne Whalley; Chris Messina; Kathy Baker; Marshall Bell; Maya Kazan; Rosanna Arquette; Polly Draper; Elea Oberon; Valarie Pettiford; Alyson Reed; Cybill Shepherd; Rita Wilson
- Cinematography: Hiro Narita; Toby Irwin; Mihai Mălaimare Jr.
- Edited by: Robert Schafer
- Music by: Laura Karpman
- Production company: American Zoetrope
- Distributed by: Blue Fox Entertainment
- Release date: September 7, 2020 (Deauville)
- Running time: 91 minutes
- Country: United States
- Language: English

Love Is Love Is Love is a 2020 American drama film directed by Eleanor Coppola, from a screenplay by Coppola and Karen Leigh Hopkins. It stars an ensemble cast led by Joanne Whalley, Chris Messina, Kathy Baker, Marshall Bell, Maya Kazan, Rosanna Arquette, Polly Draper, Elea Oberon, Valarie Pettiford, Alyson Reed, Cybill Shepherd and Rita Wilson.

The three stories explore love, commitment, and loyalty between couples and friends.

It had its world premiere at the Deauville American Film Festival on September 7, 2020.

It was the final film directed by Coppola before her death in 2024.

== Plot ==
Two for Dinner

On a Saturday night, Joanne and Jack have a virtual dinner date as he is presently working on location in Montana as a producer. The couple have grown daughters and allude to having a long happy marriage.

Jack did not call the previous night, and he claims he fell asleep watching a DVD. He asks Joanne to join him in Montana, but she fears he would not have time for her like the last time.

Suddenly, Jack's connection cuts out. When he is back, another woman is next to him, presumably from the shoot. She says hello, then excuses herself. At one point, he acts jealous when another man pays a little attention to Joanne. They sign off, as Jack says he is exhausted.

The next day Joanne, after dealing with a worker at their house, spends most of the day traveling to surprise her husband in Montana. Arriving late to where he's staying, as he is letting her in, another woman is sneaking out the back.

Sailing Lesson

Diana and John have been married over 40 years. She has adjusted to retired life well, joining various activities like book club, a gardening group with her peers... while he is stir crazy.

Claiming that Diana has become boring, John threatens to get a girlfriend if she does not shape up. So, the couple tries to reignite their honeymoon-phase heat through a spontaneous sailing trip with a boat he has recently acquired.

Arriving at the marina, the boat looks neglected, so they first have to spruce it up, with the help of a young man there. They get a sail raised but there is no wind, so they use the outboard motor. Dropping anchor, they have lunch and talk. Discussing classes they did together, both realise the other had legitimate concerns with the cooking and carpentry classes.

When they cannot get the motor restarted, they flag down a speedboat, and discover they used up the gas in the tiny motor. As they get towed back, we see Diana and John have reconnected.

Late Lunch

Young Caroline recently lost her mother Clare, so gathers together a group of her mother's closest friends for an Irish-style wake/luncheon celebration of life in mourning and remembrance.

Caroline, looking stricken and a bit intimidated by the powerful, accomplished guest list, she feels both guilty and saddened about her and her mother’s last interactions. Clare died in fact in a traffic accident on the way to visit her daughter.

A superficial round of anecdotes, most of which are news to Caroline, and comments eventually evolves into deeper remembrances. There are revelations and confessions, stories of abortion and infidelity and secret pregnancy−Caroline−, and the unexpected mid-meal arrival of a package.

The women celebrate sisterhood in tap shoes, each chooses a scarf to remember Clare by, and one sings a song she wrote “Regrets are like rocks that sink to the bottom”

== Cast ==
- Maya Kazan as Caroline
- Joanne Whalley as Joanne
- Chris Messina as Jack
- Kathy Baker as Diana
- Marshall Bell as John
- Cybill Shepherd as Nancy
- Rita Wilson as Mary Kay
- Rosanna Arquette as Anne
- Polly Draper as Milly
- Alyson Reed as Jackie
- Valarie Pettiford as Wendy
- Elea Oberon as Rose
- Nancy Carlin as Patty

== Release ==
It was scheduled to have its world premiere at the Tribeca Film Festival in April 2020, but the festival was postponed due to the COVID-19 pandemic. The film had its world premiere at the Deauville American Film Festival on September 7, 2020. In February 2021, Blue Fox Entertainment acquired distribution rights to the film.
