= Sunset Gower Studios =

Television and movie studio in Hollywood

Coordinates: 34°5′46″N 118°19′16″W

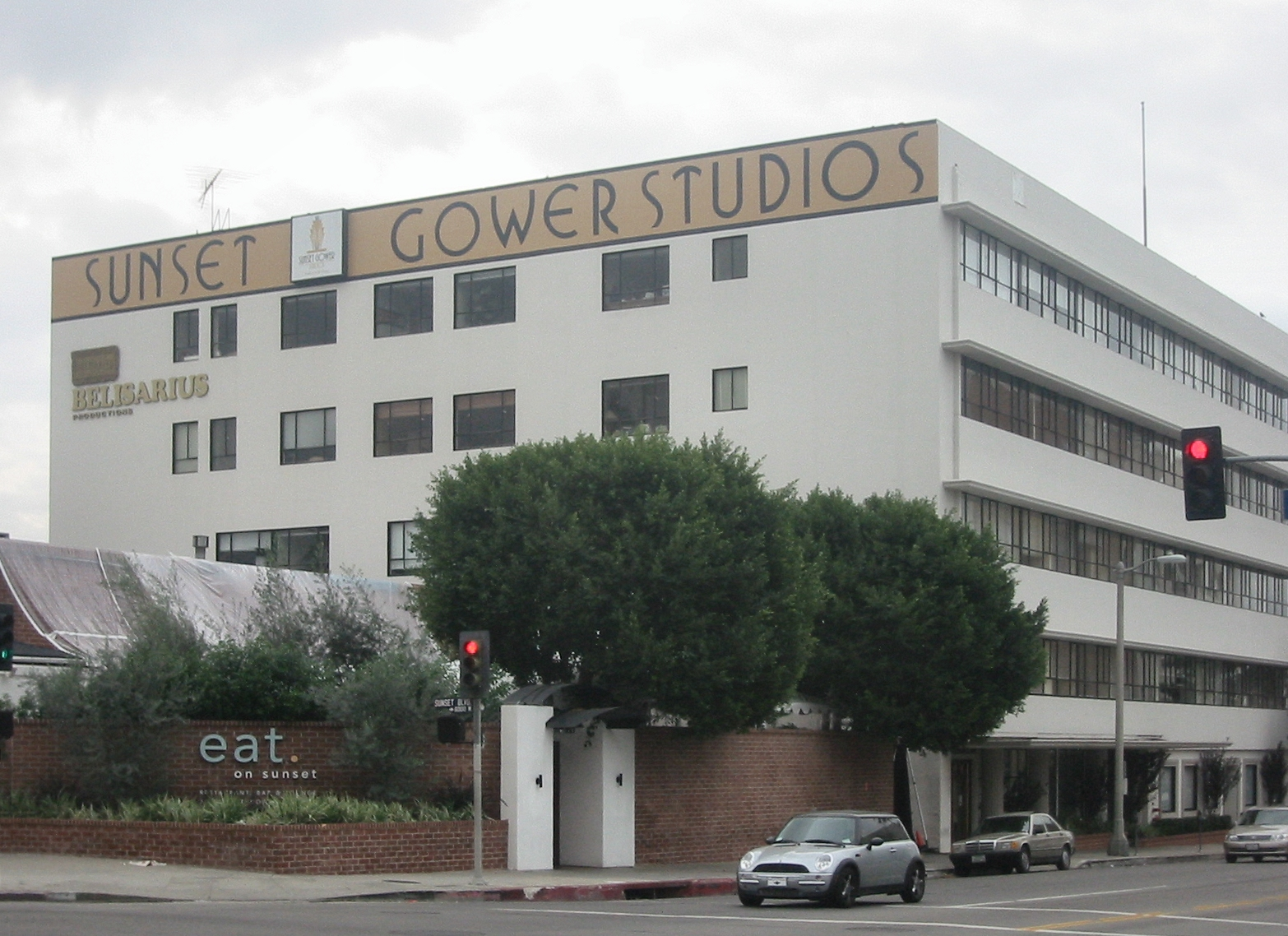
- Type: Incentive
- Industry: Media; Entertainment
- Founded: 1912
- Headquarters: 1438 North Gower Street; Hollywood, California; 90028
- Products: Television; Movie
- Website: www.sunsetstudios.com/los-angeles/sound-stages-los-angeles/

Sunset Gower Studios is a 14-acre (57,000 m^{2}) television and movie studio at the corner of Sunset Boulevard and North Gower Street in the Hollywood neighborhood of Los Angeles, California, United States. Established in 1912, it was an independent studio and an active facility for television and film production on its twelve soundstages.

== History ==
The Poverty Row area of Hollywood, bounded by Sunset Boulevard on the north, Gower Street on the west, and Beachwood Drive on the east, was a collection of small warehouses and offices where independent film makers gathered to buy "short ends" of film from the major studios, in order to create their "great American dreams". In 1922, Harry Cohn of Cohn-Brandt-Cohn (CBC) Film Sales Corporation rented 6070 Sunset Boulevard in Poverty Row. Following success and a move into feature films, CBC was renamed Columbia Pictures, and in 1926 acquired a Gower Street property with stages previously used by California Studios. In 1928, Columbia's official address became 1438 North Gower Street and that year they bought the last piece of land of the old Gower Ranch at 1400 North Gower Street.

The Sunset Gower Studios lot, the home of such Columbia classics as Frank Capra's It Happened One Night in 1934, Mr. Smith Goes to Washington in 1939, the Three Stooges shorts, The Caine Mutiny, and Funny Girl, has continued to host productions of top new films such as The Good Shepherd and The Good German. Television programs that have occupied several sound stages most notably include The Amanda Show, Bewitched, City Guys, Deal or No Deal, Dexter, The Donna Reed Show, Father Knows Best, Hazel, Heroes, Hip Hop Harry, How to Get Away with Murder, I Dream of Jeannie, JAG, Married... with Children, Moesha, The Monkees, NewsRadio, The Parkers, Saved by the Bell, Scandal, Six Feet Under, Soap, and That's So Raven; the first two seasons of The Golden Girls, the final three seasons of The Facts of Life, and the final two seasons of Silver Spoons.

Harry Cohn died in 1958 at the age of 66. His memorial service was held on stages 12 and 14 at the studios (there is no stage 13).

Without the guidance of the Cohn brothers, Columbia Pictures Corporation was not the profit-making company it once was. Between 1970 and 1972, Columbia moved from the 14-acre (57,000 m^{2}) lot and joined forces with Warner Bros. in Burbank to what would later be called The Burbank Studios, then subsequently moved to the Sony Pictures Studios (formerly MGM and Lorimar Studio) in Culver City. Its "back lot" on Hollywood Way in Burbank, where the Columbia westerns were made, became the property of Warner Bros.

Columbia Pictures Corporation, renamed "Columbia Pictures Industries, Inc." after merging with its television subsidiary Screen Gems (now Sony Pictures Television) in 1968, Columbia Pictures Industries relocated to the above mentioned The Burbank Studios. A large list of successful films were produced during this time, and in 1982, Columbia Pictures Industries, Inc. was sold to The Coca-Cola Company for $750 million.

Despite the merger, the Sunset-Gower studios provided the soundstages for popular television shows such as Bewitched and I Dream of Jeannie. In 1976, the property was purchased by the Pick Vanoff Company for $6.2 million. The name was changed to "Sunset Gower Studios" and the lot became a rental facility for independent film companies. It was also used in the seventies as a music rehearsal facility called Pirate Sound Studios, catering to musicians such as the Eagles, Fleetwood Mac, Elton John, Led Zeppelin, Olivia Newton-John, Ringo Starr, Deep Purple and Frank Zappa. For a time, stages 12 and 14 became indoor tennis courts.

In November 2004, Sunset Gower Studios was purchased by GI Partners for an estimated $105 million, and in 2006 began construction on a six-story building for Technicolor SA.

In August 2007, Sunset Gower Studios was bought by Hudson Capital. The Technicolor building opened its doors in 2008. Since 2007, the studio has been undergoing both interior and exterior improvements on the lot. Sunset Gower Studios is now working closely with its sister company Sunset Bronson Studios, located just a couple of blocks east on the site of the original Warner Bros. lot (1923–37), formerly owned by Tribune Broadcasting, and Sunset Las Palmas Studios, formerly the Hollywood Center Studios until 2017.

== Expansion project ==
In 2017, developer Hudson Pacific Properties submitted plans providing details of its new vision for Hollywood's landmark Sunset Gower Studios. The firm plans to demolish approximately 160,600 square feet (14,920 m^{2}) of existing buildings on the 16 acres (6.5 ha) site at 6050 Sunset Boulevard, adding storage area of 628,000 square feet (58,300 m^{2}).
