= Hudson Pacific Properties =

American real estate investment trust

Hudson Pacific Properties, Inc.
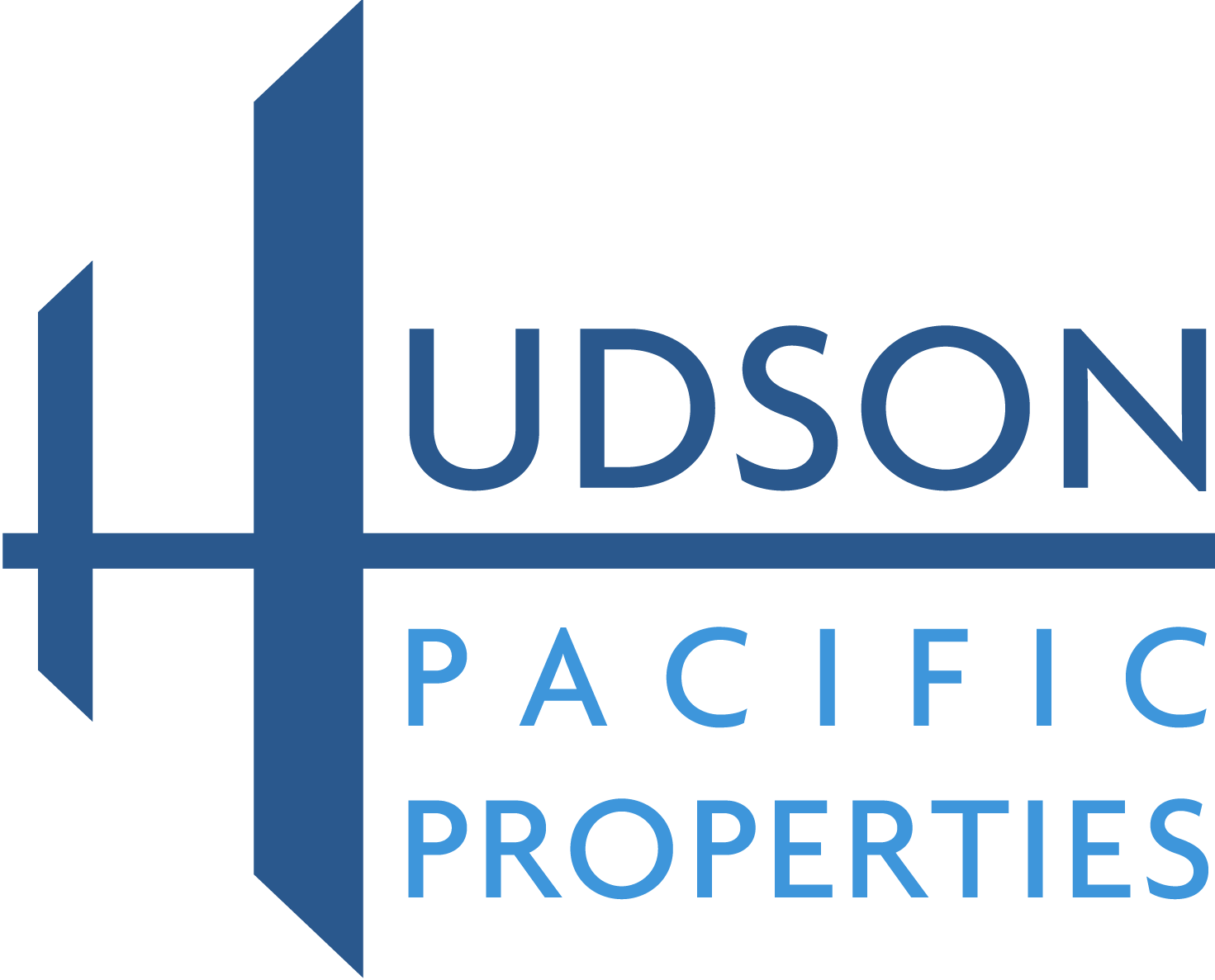
- Type: Public company
- Traded as: NYSE: HPP; S&P 600 component
- Industry: Real estate investment trust
- Founded: 2009; 17 years ago
- Founder: Victor J. Coleman
- Headquarters: Los Angeles, California, U.S.
- Key people: Victor J. Coleman; (Chairman & CEO); Mark T. Lammas; (President)
- Revenue: ▲US$897 million (2021)
- Net income: ▲US$29 million (2021)
- Total assets: ▲US$8.99 billion (2021)
- Total equity: ▲US$3.79 billion (2021)
- Number of employees: 560 (2021)
- Website: hudsonpacificproperties.com

Hudson Pacific Properties is a real estate investment trust with 15.8 million square feet of office buildings, 1.5 million square feet of sound stages, and undeveloped rights for 3 million square feet of additional commercial property. Its properties are on the West Coast of the United States and Vancouver. It is organized in Maryland and headquartered in Los Angeles. It is the largest independent operator of sound stages in Los Angeles.

== History ==
The company was founded as Hudson Capital by Victor J. Coleman. In 2007, Hudson Capital purchased Sunset Gower Studios and in 2008 purchased Sunset Bronson Studios. Hudson Capital was reformed as Hudson Pacific Properties in 2009 and on June 29, 2010, the company became a public company via an initial public offering.

In December 2014, the company acquired 26 properties in Northern California from The Blackstone Group's EQ Office for $3.5 billion. This made Hudson Pacific the largest publicly traded owner-operator of office space in Silicon Valley. In 2017 the company bought Sunset Las Palmas Studios.

In March 2019, in a joint venture with funds managed by The Blackstone Group, the company acquired Bentall Centre, Vancouver.

In June 2020, funds managed by The Blackstone Group acquired a 49% stake in several properties owned by the company.
