= Paris Can Wait =

2016 film

- Theatrical release poster
- Directed by: Eleanor Coppola
- Written by: Eleanor Coppola
- Produced by: Eleanor Coppola; Fred Roos
- Starring: Diane Lane; Arnaud Viard; Alec Baldwin
- Cinematography: Crystel Fournier
- Edited by: Akrivi Fili; Glen Scantlebury
- Music by: Laura Karpman
- Production companies: Lifetime Films; American Zoetrope; Corner Piece Capital; Protagonist Pictures Limited; Tohokushinsha Film Corporation
- Distributed by: Sony Pictures Classics
- Release dates: 12 September 2016 (TIFF); 12 May 2017 (United States)
- Running time: 92 minutes
- Countries: United States; United Kingdom
- Language: English
- Budget: $5 million
- Box office: $13.2 million

Paris Can Wait is a 2016 comedy film written, co-produced, and directed by Eleanor Coppola in her narrative directorial debut, as all of her previous directorial efforts had been documentaries and short films. It stars Diane Lane, Alec Baldwin and Arnaud Viard.

== Plot ==
Anne is in Cannes with her husband Michael, a prominent movie producer. As the festival ends, she learns that the vacation she and her husband were supposed to go on in Paris will be slightly delayed as they need to go to Budapest first. They plan to fly to Paris, but the pilot suggests Anne not fly due to an ear infection. Michael's producing partner Jacques offers to drive Anne to Paris himself.

A short car ride develops into a leisurely trip as Jacques, a French foodie, stops every hour or so to sample new food. He is flirtatious with Anne, but she begins to question his intentions when he repeatedly uses her credit card to pay for the meals they are sampling.

They visit a church (the 11th-century Romanesque Basilica of St Magdalene in Vezelay, France) where Anne grieves the baby she lost, and tells Jacques she wears her locket necklace in his honor. They share a romantic dinner together where Jacques admires Anne's photography, and asks why she doesn't share it with her husband.

Later, on the road, Jacques confides that only he knows his brother's death was a suicide, and he carries that burden so his nephew doesn't have to know. They finally reach the place where Anne is staying and almost kiss, but the elevator doors close in on them. Anne sees Jacques has driven away, but he returns to kiss her passionately and ask her to a rendez-vous with him later in San Francisco.

The morning after, just before her husband is meant to arrive in Paris, she receives a package from Jacques with chocolate roses and the money she had lent him on the trip. It includes a note that reminds her of the restaurant they will be meeting at, and she smiles at the camera, pleased.

== Cast ==
- Diane Lane as Anne Lockwood
- Alec Baldwin as Michael
- Arnaud Viard as Jacques
- Élise Tielrooy as Martine
- Laure Sineux as Hotel Receptionist

== Production ==
In February 2015, it was announced Eleanor Coppola would direct the film from a screenplay she had written, with Diane Lane, Yvan Attal and Nicolas Cage joining the cast of the film, with Fred Roos producing under their American Zoetrope banner. In September 2015, it was announced Arnaud Viard and Alec Baldwin had joined the cast of the film, replacing Attal and Cage, respectively, with Lifetime joining as a co-producer.

=== Filming ===
Principal photography began on June 15, 2015 and concluded on July 31, 2015.

== Release ==
The film had its world premiere in the Special Presentations section at the 2016 Toronto International Film Festival on September 12, 2016. Shortly after, Sony Pictures Classics acquired North American distribution rights to the film, releasing it on May 12, 2017.

== Reception ==
On review aggregator Rotten Tomatoes, the film has an approval rating of 47% based on 111 reviews, with an average rating of 5.39/10. The site's critical consensus reads, "Paris Can Wait's likable stars are ill-served by a film that lacks interesting ideas or characters and has little to offer beyond striking travelogue visuals." On Metacritic, the film has a score of 48 out of 100, based on 25 critics, indicating "mixed or average reviews".
