= American Zoetrope =

American film production studio

- Type: Private
- Industry: Motion pictures Television
- Founded: December 12, 1969; 56 years ago
- Founder: Francis Ford Coppola; George Lucas
- Headquarters: San Francisco, California, United States
- Owner: Francis Ford Coppola; Roman Coppola; Sofia Coppola
- Website: zoetrope.com

American Zoetrope (also known as Omni Zoetrope from 1977 to 1980 and Zoetrope Studios from 1980 until 1991) is a privately run American film production company, centered in San Francisco, California, and founded by Francis Ford Coppola and George Lucas.

Opened on December 12, 1969, the studio has produced not only the films of Coppola (including Apocalypse Now, Bram Stoker's Dracula and Tetro), but also George Lucas' pre-Star Wars films THX 1138 and American Graffiti, as well as many others by avant-garde directors such as Jean-Luc Godard, Akira Kurosawa, Wim Wenders and Godfrey Reggio. American Zoetrope was an early adopter of digital filmmaking, including some of the earliest uses of HDTV.

Four films produced by American Zoetrope are included in the American Film Institute's Top 100 Films. American Zoetrope-produced films have received 15 Academy Awards and 68 nominations.

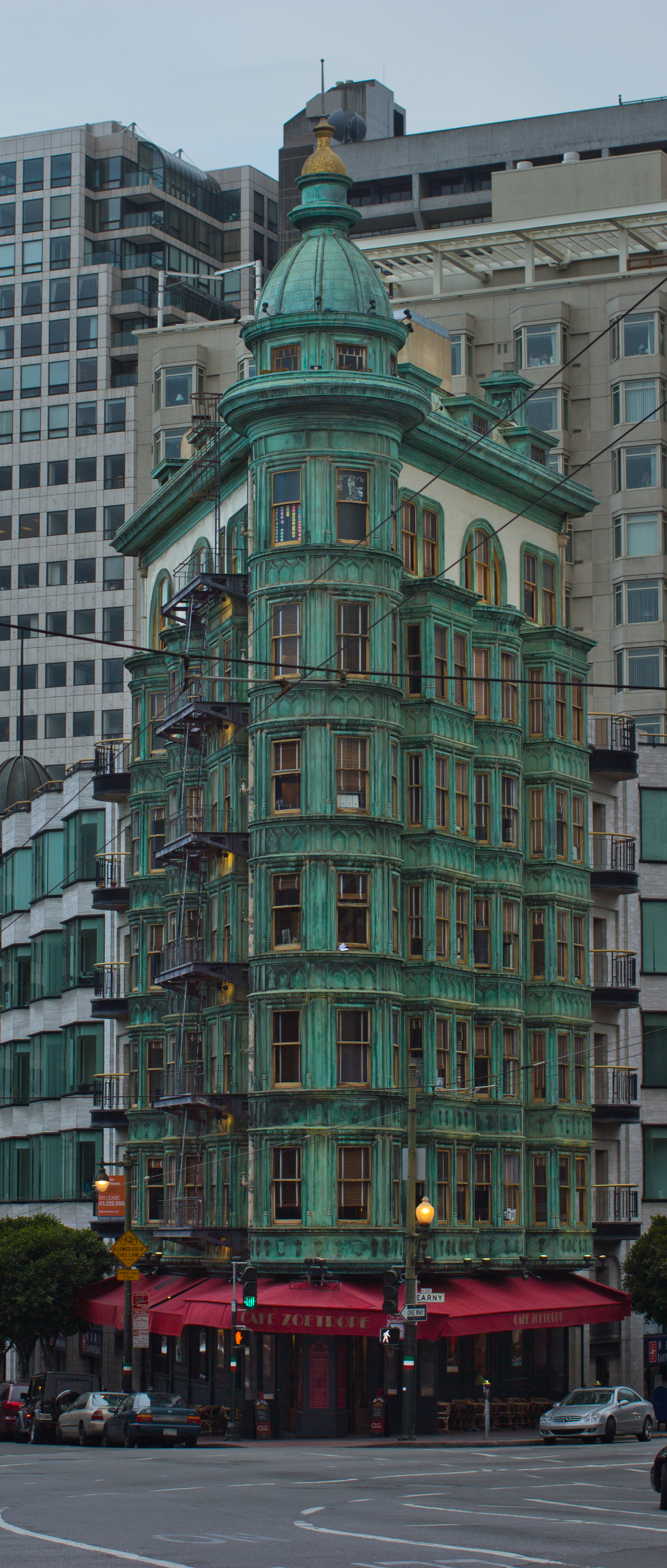
American Zoetrope is located in the Sentinel Building.

== History ==
Initially located in a warehouse at 827 Folsom Street on the second floor of The Automatt building, the company's headquarters have, since 1972, been in the historic Sentinel Building, at 916 Kearny Street in San Francisco's North Beach neighborhood.

Coppola named the studio after a zoetrope he was given in the late 1960s by the filmmaker and collector of early film devices, Mogens Skot-Hansen. "Zoetrope" is also the name by which Coppola's quarterly fiction magazine, Zoetrope: All-Story, is often known.

The company was initially based at Warner Bros.-Seven Arts, where he had run until a dispute had emerged in 1970, a year before THX 1138 was released.

In 1972, Coppola partnered with Peter Bogdanovich and William Friedkin to set up The Directors Company at Paramount Pictures, which was affiliated with Zoetrope, and The Conversation was one of the films that came out of the deal. When the effort failed, the company bought out an interest in New York-based film distributor Cinema 5. He later started a new company Coppola-Cinema 7 in 1975, after talks with Cinema 7 failed and set up with a major distributor.

In 1980, the company bought General Service Studios in Hollywood, California, and became Zoetrope Studios, to produce and distribute films, as did later DreamWorks studio.

Zoetrope as a whole faced bankruptcy between 1983 and 1992 after losing money on One from the Heart, and shut down its production studio in Hollywood and returned to being a production company in San Francisco, initially retaining the Zoetrope Studios name, the studio readopting the American Zoetrope name in 1991 with a first-look deal at Columbia Pictures, and Bram Stoker's Dracula became the first film to come out of the pact. Coppola had sold the studio in 1984 to The Singer Family and rechristened as Hollywood Center Studios.

The studio also provided funding for Commercial Pictures, a studio formed by Roman Coppola and Sofia Coppola in 1988, who had produced low-budget feature films, most notably Clownhouse and The Spirit of '76. In the mid-1990s, the company entered into TV movies and miniseries, signing a contract with RHI Entertainment to produce material. In 1997, the company signed a deal with PolyGram Television to finance television projects.

In 1999, it signed a deal with Metro-Goldwyn-Mayer (MGM) for a first-look financing and production agreement. In 2000, it signed a ten-year financing pact with VCL Film + Medien to handle foreign sales of their own titles.

By 2007, ownership of American Zoetrope had been passed to Coppola's son and daughter, directors Roman Coppola and Sofia Coppola.

In 2010, Lionsgate announced a deal to distribute American Zoetrope films, including classics like The Conversation and Apocalypse Now, in North America on DVD, Blu-ray, electronic-sell-through, VOD as well as broadcast distribution rights. The only movies from the Coppola canon that will not be released as part of the pact are The Godfather trilogy, which is owned by Paramount.

Zoetrope.com, the Coppola family's website, was created around 1996 and became an online community for writers. In 2016, Francis Ford Coppola announced its relaunch as a "virtual studio".

In 2024, American Zoetrope earned its first Tony Award for Best Musical as one of the producers of the 2023 stage musical adaptation of The Outsiders.

== Filmography ==
=== Feature films ===
Year	Title	Director	Company	Credit	References
1969	The Rain People	Francis Ford Coppola	American Zoetrope	Production company	
1971	THX 1138	George Lucas	American Zoetrope	Production company	
1972	The Godfather	Francis Ford Coppola	American Zoetrope	Production company	
1972	Ludwig: Requiem for a Virgin King	Hans-Jürgen Syberberg	American Zoetrope	Distributor	
1973	American Graffiti	George Lucas	American Zoetrope	Production company	
1974	The Conversation	Francis Ford Coppola	American Zoetrope	Production company	
1974	The Godfather Part II	Francis Ford Coppola	American Zoetrope	Production facilities furnished through (as American Zoetrope San Francisco)	
1977	Perfumed Nightmare	Kidlat Tahimik	American Zoetrope	Distributor	
1977	Hitler: A Film from Germany	Hans-Jürgen Syberberg	Omni Zoetrope	Distributor	
1979	Apocalypse Now	Francis Ford Coppola	Omni Zoetrope	Production company	
1979	The Black Stallion	Carroll Ballard	Omni Zoetrope	Production company	
1980	Sauve qui peut (la vie)	Jean-Luc Godard	Zoetrope Studios	Production company/distributor	
1980	Kagemusha	Akira Kurosawa	Zoetrope Studios	Production company	
1982	Parsifal	Hans-Jürgen Syberberg	Zoetrope Studios	Distributor	
1982	The Escape Artist	Caleb Deschanel	Zoetrope Studios	Production company	
1982	Passion	Jean-Luc Godard	Zoetrope Studios	Production company/distributor	
1982	The Grey Fox	Phillip Borsos	Zoetrope Studios	Production company	
1982	Koyaanisqatsi	Godfrey Reggio	Zoetrope Studios	Production company	
1982	The Making of 'One from the Heart'	Tony St. John	Zoetrope Studios	Production company	
1982	Hammett	Wim Wenders	Zoetrope Studios	Production company	
1982	One from the Heart	Francis Ford Coppola	Zoetrope Studios	Production company/distributor	
1983	The Outsiders	Francis Ford Coppola	Zoetrope Studios	Production company	
1983	Rumble Fish	Francis Ford Coppola	Zoetrope Studios	Production company	
1983	The Black Stallion Returns	Robert Dalva	Zoetrope Studios	Production company	
1984	The Cotton Club	Francis Ford Coppola	Zoetrope Studios	Production company	
1985	Seven Minutes in Heaven	Linda Feferman	Zoetrope Studios	Production company	
1985	Mishima: A Life in Four Chapters	Paul Schrader	Zoetrope Studios	Production company	
1986	Peggy Sue Got Married	Francis Ford Coppola	Zoetrope Studios	Production company	
1987	Tough Guys Don't Dance	Norman Mailer	Zoetrope Studios	Production company	
1987	Gardens of Stone	Francis Ford Coppola	Zoetrope Studios	Production company	
1987	Barfly	Barbet Schroeder	Zoetrope Studios	Production company	
1988	Tucker: The Man and His Dream	Francis Ford Coppola	Zoetrope Studios	Production company	
1989	Wait Until Spring, Bandini	Dominique Deruddere	Zoetrope Studios	Production company	
1990	The Godfather Part III	Francis Ford Coppola	Zoetrope Studios	Production company	
1991	Hearts of Darkness: A Filmmaker's Apocalypse	Fax Bahr, Eleanor Coppola, and George Hickenlooper	American Zoetrope	Production company	
1992	Bram Stoker's Dracula	Francis Ford Coppola	American Zoetrope	Production company	
1992	Wind	Carroll Ballard	American Zoetrope	Production company	
1993	The Secret Garden	Agnieszka Holland	American Zoetrope	Production company	
1994	Mary Shelley's Frankenstein	Kenneth Branagh	American Zoetrope	Production company	
1994	Don Juan DeMarco	Jeremy Leven	American Zoetrope	Production company	
1995	Haunted	Lewis Gilbert	American Zoetrope	Production company	
1995	My Family	Gregory Nava	American Zoetrope	Production company	
1996	Jack	Francis Ford Coppola	American Zoetrope	Production company	
1997	The Rainmaker	Francis Ford Coppola	American Zoetrope	Production company	
1997	Buddy	Caroline Thompson	American Zoetrope	Production company (as An American Zoetrope Production)	
1999	The Florentine	Nick Stagliano	American Zoetrope	Production company	
1999	The Virgin Suicides	Sofia Coppola	American Zoetrope	Production company	
1999	The Third Miracle	Agnieszka Holland	American Zoetrope	Production company	
1999	Sleepy Hollow	Tim Burton	American Zoetrope	Production company	
2001	Jeepers Creepers	Victor Salva	American Zoetrope	Production company	
2001	CQ	Roman Coppola	American Zoetrope	Production company	
2001	No Such Thing	Hal Hartley	American Zoetrope	Production company	
2001	Suriyothai	Chatrichalerm Yukol	American Zoetrope	Production company	
2002	Pumpkin	Anthony Abrams and Adam Larson Broder	American Zoetrope	Production company	
2002	Assassination Tango	Robert Duvall	American Zoetrope	Production company	
2003	Lost in Translation	Sofia Coppola	American Zoetrope	Production company	
2003	Jeepers Creepers 2	Victor Salva	American Zoetrope	Production company	
2004	Kinsey	Bill Condon	American Zoetrope	Production company (uncredited)	
2006	Marie Antoinette	Sofia Coppola	American Zoetrope	Production company	
2006	The Good Shepherd	Robert De Niro	American Zoetrope	Production company	
2007	Youth Without Youth	Francis Ford Coppola	American Zoetrope	Production company	
2009	Tetro	Francis Ford Coppola	American Zoetrope	Production company	
2010	Somewhere	Sofia Coppola	American Zoetrope	Production company	
2011	Twixt	Francis Ford Coppola	American Zoetrope	Production company	
2012	A Glimpse Inside the Mind of Charles Swan III	Roman Coppola	American Zoetrope	Production company	
2012	On the Road	Walter Salles	American Zoetrope	Production company	
2013	Palo Alto	Gia Coppola	American Zoetrope	Production company	
2013	The Bling Ring	Sofia Coppola	American Zoetrope	Production company	
2014	Life After Beth	Jeff Baena	American Zoetrope	Production company	
2015	A Very Murray Christmas	Sofia Coppola	American Zoetrope	Production company	
2015	Last Days in the Desert	Rodrigo García	American Zoetrope	Production company	
2016	Paris Can Wait	Eleanor Coppola	American Zoetrope	Production company	
2016	Joshy	Jeff Baena	American Zoetrope	Production company	
2017	The Beguiled	Sofia Coppola	American Zoetrope	Production company	
2020	Love Is Love Is Love	Eleanor Coppola	American Zoetrope	Production company	
2020	On the Rocks	Sofia Coppola	American Zoetrope	Production company	
2021	Mainstream	Gia Coppola	American Zoetrope	Production company	
2023	Fairyland	Andrew Durham	American Zoetrope	Production company	
2023	Priscilla	Sofia Coppola	American Zoetrope	Production company	
2024	Megalopolis	Francis Ford Coppola	American Zoetrope	Production company	

=== Television series ===
Year	Title	Creator	Company	Credit	Network	Notes	References
1990	The Outsiders	characters by: S.E. Hinton developed by: S.E. Hinton; Joe Byrne; Jeb Rosebrook	Zoetrope Studios	Production Company	Fox	co-production with Papazian-Hirsch Entertainment	
1997	The Odyssey	Andrei Konchalovsky based on Odyssey by: Homer	American Zoetrope	Production Company (as American Zoetrope San Francisco)	NBC	miniseries; co-production with Hallmark Entertainment	
1998	Moby Dick	Anton Diether; Franc Roddam; Benedict Fitzgerald based on Moby-Dick by: Herman Melville	American Zoetrope	Production Company	USA Network	miniseries; co-production with Hallmark Entertainment, Nine Network Australia and USA Pictures	
1998–2001	First Wave	Chris Brancato	American Zoetrope	Production Company	Sci-Fi Channel	co-production with Sugar Entertainment	
2003	Platinum	John Ridley; Sofia Coppola	American Zoetrope	Production Company	UPN	co-production with The Greenblatt/Janollari Studio, International Famous Players Radio Picture Corporation and Eye Productions	
2004–2007	The 4400	René Echevarria; Scott Peters	American Zoetrope	Production Company	USA Network	co-production with Renegade 83, Viacom Productions (season 1), Paramount Network Television (season 2) and CBS Paramount Network Television (seasons 3–4)	
2014–2018	Mozart in the Jungle	based on Mozart in the Jungle: Sex, Drugs, and Classical Music by: Blair Tindall developed by: Roman Coppola; Jason Schwartzman; Alex Timbers; Paul Weitz	American Zoetrope	Production Company	Amazon Video	co-production with Depth of Field, Picrow and Amazon Studios	

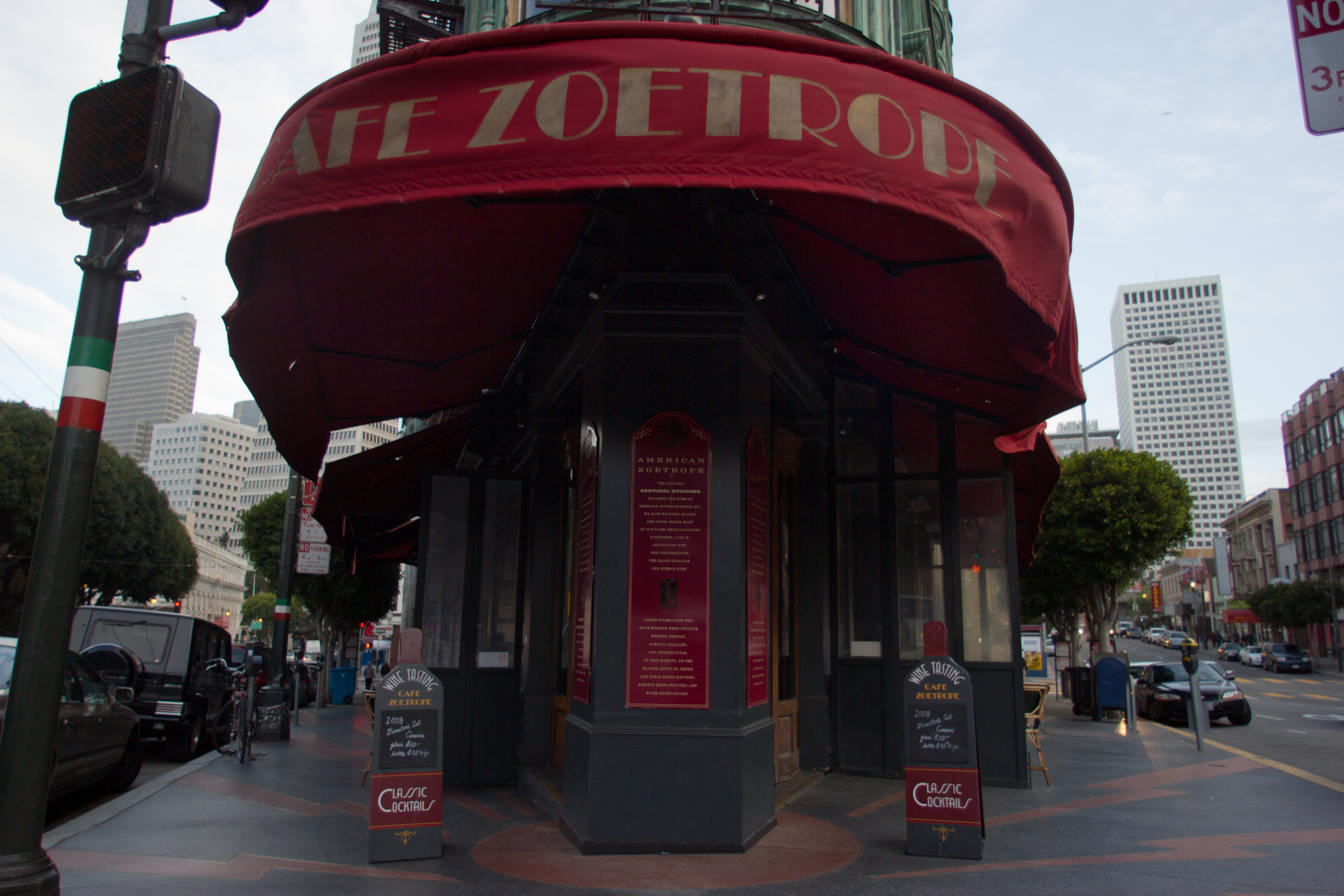
Cafe Zoetrope at ground level of the building

== Cafe Zoetrope ==
In the building lobby, Coppola operates a small Italian café, Cafe Zoetrope, featuring Inglenook Estate wine and memorabilia from his films. Earlier, the building had been the location of Enrico Banducci's "hungry i" nightclub.

The neighborhood is well known for its cafes and its writers. Coppola wrote much of the screenplay for The Godfather in the nearby Caffe Trieste and Lawrence Ferlinghetti's City Lights Books is located up Columbus Avenue from the Sentinel Building.
