= Jack Singer =

Canadian real estate developer, financier, and philanthropist (1917–2013)

- Born: 1917; Calgary, Alberta
- Died: February 2, 2013 (aged 94–95); Los Angeles, California
- Occupation: Real estate developer
- Known for: Hollywood Center Studios

Jack Singer (1917 – February 2, 2013) was a Canadian real estate developer, financier, and philanthropist. Although he owned numerous properties across Canada and the USA, he is most famous for his acquisition of Zoetrope Studio in Hollywood, once the primary film property of director, Francis Ford Coppola. Furthermore, the Jack Singer Concert Hall in Calgary is named after him.

== Personal life ==
Jack Singer was born in Calgary in 1917, one of four siblings: Hymie, Diane (Aceman), and Rosalie (Franks). Singer and his late wife, Shirley (née Cohen), had two sons, Alan Singer and the late Stephen Singer, plus five grandchildren: JL, Leslie, Adam, Quinn, and Carly.

His mother, Bella Singer, was born in 1880 in Radom, Poland, the eighth of eleven children. In 1905 she married Abraham Singer and the couple soon left to seek a better life in Canada. Bella first worked as a housekeeper at the Palliser Hotel, and then ran rooming houses during the early years, while Abraham began a number of successful business ventures. He was a scrap dealer, a second-hand store operator, a Banff hotelier, and later owned a number of farming and commercial realty operations. Singer’s immigrant parents used their savings to help hundreds of Jews escape persecution before and during the Second World War, and in doing so, instilled in their son an entrepreneurial and philanthropic spirit. The Singers required each person they brought over to bring somebody else, ready to work. Perhaps 1,600 Canadians now count themselves descended from Bella’s "pyramid scheme."

In 1944, Singer married Shirley Cohen. At the urging of a close friend who was smitten with Cohen, Singer reluctantly agreed to date her, fully intending to hand off Cohen to his buddy. However, upon their first meeting, Singer fell madly in love and, instead of a matchmaker, he became a groom. It would not be long before the Singers were a fashionable power couple in Calgary social circles and, until her death in 2001, their impact upon the city’s culture was most significant.

Singer always held a special fondness for the entertainment business. Over the years, as he spent more time in Southern California, he became friends with many Hollywood actors, including Peter Lorre, Truman Capote, and George Burns.

== Business Interests ==
By the age of 11, Singer was helping his mother with the books while collecting rents from the family owned rooming houses.

At the age of 17, Singer turned to business, and found a partner in Abraham (Avrum) Belzberg. Singer approached Belzberg with a business proposition, suggesting that they could buy the Foothills Building in Calgary for $60,000. That successful deal inspired them to form a partnership, United Management, a real estate business venture that continued for four decades thereafter and, at one point, held 200 pieces of property.

During the ‘50s and ‘60s, Singer and his older brother, Hymie, introduced Alberta to the strip mall. They would land anchor tenants such as banks and grocery stores, which would help them get financing and snap up land. They would go on to develop other commercial sites around Calgary and they built several Calgary landmarks such as the Southland Commercial Centre and Alberta Place. Ultimately, they expanded their real estate empire through Western Canada and into California, Arizona and Texas.

Singer also formed the Atlas Finance and Realty Corporation. Most famously known for providing loans to finance "One from the Heart," by Francis Ford Coppola, the company also owned 50 percent of Cornwall Petroleum and Resources Ltd. with oil properties in the United States and New Zealand.

=== Hollywood Center Studios ===
In 1981, Jack Singer was golfing in Palm Springs when he was asked if he was interested in touring Francis Coppola’s Zoetrope Studio, where the director of The Godfather films was shooting, "One From The Heart." At that time, Coppola’s studio was located in Hollywood. Singer loved movies, so he tagged along looking for an autograph, not a deal. But he met the director, the pair hit it off, and soon Singer injected $3-million into the film. However, the film was an expensive box-office flop that pushed Coppola into receivership. In 1984, the Singer family bid $12.3-million at auction for the studio and, since they were the only bidders, they won, subsequently renaming it, the Hollywood Center Studios. Several lawsuits followed, along with the inevitable falling-out with Coppola, who, according to the Los Angeles Times, accused Singer of "using the loan as a wedge to take away his studio." Coppola privately believed the Singer family was trying to ruin him; however, eventually, the matter was settled out of court.

Over the years, the Singers pumped more than $20 million into various upgrades at the Hollywood Center Studios: the lot's control rooms, camera packages and infrastructure were upgraded to HDTV. This was done to support numerous television clients. Three cvc stages were added and a virtual set stage was also built to provide a cost-effective way to produce high-quality content for broadcast and the web. Additionally, production office space more than doubled, providing homes for dozens of independent companies, representing every niche in the industry. Finally, the studio installed a solar panel, the largest of its kind in Hollywood that provides renewable, environmentally-friendly power to the entire lot. As such, it was a source of tremendous pride when, in 2011, the Los Angeles City Council, via Councilman Tom LaBonge, issued a proclamation thanking Singer for his inspiration in leading the revitalization of the District of Hollywood and his dedication to the film industry. The LA City Council underscored one particular point: "Jack Singer came for an autograph and ended up saving the community."

In May, 2017, a Los Angeles based real estate company, Hudson Pacific Properties Inc., purchased Hollywood Center Studios from the Singer family for $200 million, then immediately renamed the property as the "Sunset Las Palmas Studios"

== Sports Interests ==
An all-round athlete as a teenager, Singer was a star pitcher on the Central Memorial High School baseball team, a quarterback, and a Canadian Golden Gloves boxer with 17 straight wins. As a teenager, Singer won the Canadian lightweight amateur boxing championship, and had his sights set upon a professional career. However, injuries in the form of two perforated eardrums ultimately convinced him otherwise.

Singer raised money for WWII causes, bringing in top boxers for exhibition matches.

Singer co-owned a thoroughbred racehorse named Tyhawk. In 1959, Tyhawk set a world record over six-and-a-half furlongs at one minute 14.4 seconds at Turf Paradise Race Course in Phoenix. In 1960, Tyhawk won the Highlander Stakes at Woodbine Racetrack in Toronto, matching a course record of 1 minute 10.2 seconds over six furlongs on dirt. Tyhawk was inducted later into the British Columbia Horse Racing Hall of Fame, and has been considered "possibly the top BC sprinter of all time."

In 1997, Singer launched an unsuccessful $70 million bid for the Toronto Blue Jays, a Major League Baseball team.

== Philanthropy ==
=== Jack Singer Concert Hall ===
Named after Jack Singer (thanks to a $1.5M contribution from his sons, Alan Singer and the late Stephen Singer), the concert hall opened its doors in 1985. The Jack Singer Concert Hall is located at the Arts Commons, a performing arts complex occupying 10 acres (4.5 hectares) in downtown Calgary. The Jack Singer Concert Hall is described as one of the most beautiful and acoustically acclaimed venues in North America. Artec consultants designed the adjustable acoustics system that includes a canopy, clad in laminated spruce wood. Suspended high above the stage and weighing 185,000-pounds (90-tons), this massive acoustical reflector can be raised or lowered to adjust the acoustical environment to meet the needs of the broad spectrum of music performed in the hall. Another prominent feature is the Carthy Organ. As one of Canada’s largest pipe organs, the Carthy Organ is hand-carved from solid oak and contains more than 1600 polished alloy and wood pipes. The acquisition of the organ was made possible through the Carthy Foundation, thanks to a $750,000 donation from the Mannix Family. With 2021 seats, the Jack Singer Concert Hall is home to the Calgary Philharmonic Orchestra, BD&P World Music, and TD Jazz.

== Sources ==
- Sloane, Leonard (15 April 1981). "Business People; From Reality to Movies, New York Times, 1981". The New York Times.
- "Calgary Tycoon Jack Singer was Larger than Life, The Globe and Mail, 2013". The Globe and Mail. 15 February 2013.
- "L.A.'s Unlikeliest Angel: Looking Back on Jack Singer, MacLeans, 2013".
- "Prominent Real Estate Developer and Philanthropist Jack Singer Dies, CTV News, 2013". 3 February 2013.
- "Jack Singer, Obituary, Calgary Herald, 2013". Legacy.com.
