= One from the Heart =

1982 film by Francis Ford Coppola

- Theatrical release poster
- Directed by: Francis Ford Coppola
- Screenplay by: Armyan Bernstein; Francis Ford Coppola
- Story by: Armyan Bernstein
- Produced by: Gray Frederickson; Fred Roos
- Starring: Frederic Forrest; Teri Garr; Raúl Juliá; Nastassja Kinski; Lainie Kazan; Harry Dean Stanton
- Cinematography: Vittorio Storaro; Ronald Víctor García
- Edited by: Rudi Fehr; Anne Goursaud; Randy Roberts
- Music by: Tom Waits
- Production company: Zoetrope Studios
- Distributed by: Columbia Pictures
- Release date: February 11, 1982
- Running time: 107 minutes (theatrical release); 99 minutes (restored version, 2003); 95 minutes (Reprise, 2023)
- Country: United States
- Language: English
- Budget: $26 million
- Box office: $637,355 (U.S.)

One from the Heart is a 1982 American musical romantic drama film co-written and directed by Francis Ford Coppola. Starring Frederic Forrest, Teri Garr, Raúl Juliá, Nastassja Kinski, Lainie Kazan and Harry Dean Stanton. The film follows Hank and Frannie, a couple in Las Vegas who separate on their anniversary and embark on new romances over the course of a single night.

Unlike traditional musicals where characters sing their own emotions and convey plot information through song, the narrative of One from the Heart is accompanied by a soundtrack composed by Tom Waits and performed by Waits and Crystal Gayle. The non-diegetic music functions as an external commentary on the story rather than being sung by the characters themselves.

Developed and produced independently by Coppola's Zoetrope Studios, the film was originally conceived as a modest romantic comedy before evolving into an ambitious stylized production featuring elaborate sets, miniatures and extensive visual effects. Coppola incorporated innovative filmmaking techniques, including electronic cinema, while cinematographer Vittorio Storaro influenced the film's visual approach. The project underwent significant budget increases, leading to financial difficulties for Zoetrope and a change in distributors.

One from the Heart was theatrically released in the United States on February 11, 1982, by Columbia Pictures. It was a critical and commercial failure upon its initial release, contributing to Coppola's financial struggles. However, it has since received a positive critical reappraisal. The film was recut in 2003 for a home media release, and again in 2024 with a revised version, subtitled Reprise, overseen by Coppola.

== Plot synopsis ==
In Las Vegas, Hank, a mechanic, and Frannie, a travel agent, celebrate their fifth anniversary on Independence Day. Their evening begins with excitement, but soon turns into an argument when Frannie expresses frustration with Hank's lack of spontaneity and desire for adventure. She feels stagnant in their relationship, while Hank is content with their routine and has just purchased a house for them without consulting her. As tensions rise, they break up, with Frannie storming out of their home.

That night, they each seek comfort elsewhere. Hank crosses paths with Leila, a circus performer who captivates him with her free-spirited nature. Frannie, meanwhile, meets Ray, a waiter who claims to be a pianist and singer. She is drawn to his charm and the sense of excitement he offers. Both spend the night with their respective new partners, experiencing the romantic fantasy they had each longed for.

The next day, Hank begins to regret his decision and realizes that he still loves Frannie. Determined to win her back, he tracks her down to a motel where she is staying with Ray. Bursting into their room, Hank interrupts them and pleads with Frannie to return to him. Frannie, however, refuses, standing by her decision to move on. She insists that she wants something different from life and does not believe Hank is capable of change. Frannie continues with her plan to leave Las Vegas, booking a flight to Bora Bora, a destination she has long dreamed of visiting. Ray encourages her to embrace the adventure, reinforcing her belief that leaving is the right choice. As she prepares to depart, Hank struggles to accept the reality of losing her.

Desperate to prove his love, Hank follows Frannie to the airport. As she is about to board her plane, he makes a final attempt to win her back. In front of the crowd, he sings to her, something he would never have done before, trying to demonstrate that he is capable of the romantic gestures she always wanted. Despite his efforts, Frannie boards the plane, leaving Hank heartbroken.

Hank returns home, devastated. In a moment of despair, he gathers Frannie's belongings and prepares to burn them. However, before he can go through with it, Frannie unexpectedly returns. Having left the plane at the last moment, she tells Hank that she made a mistake. The film ends with them embracing, leaving their future open-ended.

== Cast ==
- Frederic Forrest as Hank
- Teri Garr as Frannie
- Raúl Juliá as Ray
- Nastassja Kinski as Leila
- Lainie Kazan as Maggie
- Harry Dean Stanton as Moe
- Allen Garfield as the restaurant owner
- Rebecca De Mornay as an understudy

The director's parents, Italia and Carmine Coppola, appear as a couple in an elevator. Laurence Fishburne's scenes were cut from the film.

== Production ==
One From the Heart originally was to be financed by MGM, with the studio giving Francis Ford Coppola a record $2 million to direct. Coppola initially rejected the offer, then bought the rights to the property through his Zoetrope Studios, with MGM remaining as a distributor for North America. Zoetrope raised financing via foreign pre-sales and a loan from Chase Manhattan Bank. Initially, the film was to be a romantic comedy, but Coppola wanted a more ambitious production, raising the film's budget from $15 million to $23 million, paying for miniatures and lavish backgrounds. The film was almost entirely shot on Zoetrope soundstages. Coppola insisted on building sets to add to the artificiality of the proscenium. However, Zoetrope was struggling to stay afloat and its staff wound up working on a reduced payroll. The film's tax-shelter investors pulled out and MGM thus withdrew its support for the project. Eventually, Coppola received support from Canadian businessman Jack Singer, who agreed to lend $8 million to Zoetrope. In February 1981, Paramount Pictures took over as distributor.

Set construction included a replica of part of Las Vegas' McCarran International Airport—complete with a jetway and jet airliner (built from the nose section of a crashed plane)—that was used for the penultimate scene. The sets for the film took up all of the sound-stage space at Coppola's recently acquired American Zoetrope studio. One From the Heart was filmed in Technovision with an unusual for the time aspect ratio of 1.37:1, the common aspect ratio for sound films made before the widespread adoption of widescreen in the mid-1950s.

One from the Heart features an original soundtrack from Crystal Gayle and Tom Waits. Waits received a nomination for the Academy Award for Best Original Song Score or Adaptation Score at the 55th Academy Awards. Dean Tavoularis, whose art department was next door to the musical rehearsal space, used Waits' music as tonal inspiration, incorporating it into the film's highly stylized "look". Mickey Hart and musician Bobby Vega also were credited for their contributions to the production. Coppola used the opportunity to introduce a more economic method of filmmaking. Dubbed the "electronic cinema", it involved shooting and editing a visual storyboard on videotape, allowing for a reference during the actual shooting on film. Gene Kelly was a dance consultant for the sequence involving Teri Garr and Raúl Juliá. Kelly disagreed with Coppola over the story the dance was meant to portray. Coppola used his own preference for the theatrical release, although the film's 2003 restoration depicted Kelly's original idea.

Coppola initially envisioned making the movie as "live cinema", which would have consisted of live music and performance (a collection of eight ten-minute reels spliced together to appear continuous because, at that time, film cameras could only record ten minutes at a time) so it would not have to be edited. However, cinematographer Vittorio Storaro asked Coppola to take a more conventional cinematic approach. Because of their previous collaborations (as well as Tavoularis supporting Storaro), he agreed instead of firing and replacing Storaro. Coppola listed this decision as his life's biggest regret.

== Release ==
A screening of an unfinished print in San Francisco, California in August 1981 resulted in many exhibitors backing out of showing the film. Paramount decided on a general release in February 1982. The studio also stated that it would hold Academy Award-consideration screenings in December 1981, but backed out; Coppola believed that Paramount wanted to focus on Oscar campaigns for Reds and Ragtime but the studio insisted that they didn't want to pose a threat to the wide release.

Coppola booked a New York City preview on January 15, 1982, at Radio City Music Hall without the authorization of Paramount. These screenings further soured the relationship between Coppola and Paramount, which was problematic during the arduous shooting and only increased as a result of the poor screening in San Francisco. Paramount ultimately pulled out of the distribution of the film despite the fact that it was booked in theaters throughout America. At almost the last minute, Coppola forged a new deal with Columbia Pictures.

On January 19, 2024, in select theaters in the United States, an updated and restored version of the film, entitled One From the Heart: Reprise was released in 4K.

== Box office ==
The film grossed $389,249 on its first weekend in 41 theaters, with a total gross of $636,796, against a $26 million budget. In other European countries, it didn't perform much better. The film was released in Spain 3 years later (both in dubbed and subtitled versions), where it would eventually gross 36 million pesetas (which converted to $240K). In France, it sold 494,408 admissions, for an unspecified amount of money. The commercial failure of the film resulted in a decade of financial turmoil for Coppola and his production companies.

== Reception and legacy ==
On the review aggregator website Rotten Tomatoes, the film holds an approval rating of 51% based on 45 critics. The website's critics consensus reads, "One from the Heart belies its reputation as a flop with Francis Ford Coppola's earnest intentions and technical virtuosity, but not even the director's ardor for the genre is enough to make audiences feel much for its characters." Janet Maslin in The New York Times described it as an "innovative, audacious effort", but said the film lacked story and tension. In a later interview, Coppola said that the film was still a "work in progress" when screened for blind bidding. He said the unfinished version was "a mess". He went on to say that "it was clear that it wasn't going to get a fair shot."

The film's cinematography has come to be lauded in recent years. In the Los Angeles Times, Susan King praised One from the Heart as "so visually arresting, it's shocking that it wasn't well received back in 1982." Philip French called the film "visually stunning", but also considered it to "[alternate] between the banal and the sublime". Warren Clements of The Globe and Mail stated: "It has the form, style and often the content of a romantic fantasy, but the central love story is between two characters who don't seem to like each other very much. It is a candy with a sour centre."

Gene Siskel, who gave the film a thumbs up in its original run, recommended it as part of "Buried Treasures" in a 1986 episode of At the Movies.

== See also ==
- List of films set in Las Vegas
- New Hollywood
- List of American independent films
