= Old Warner Brothers Studios =

- Executive Office Building, Old Warner Brothers Studio
- U.S. National Register of Historic Places
- Los Angeles Historic-Cultural Monument
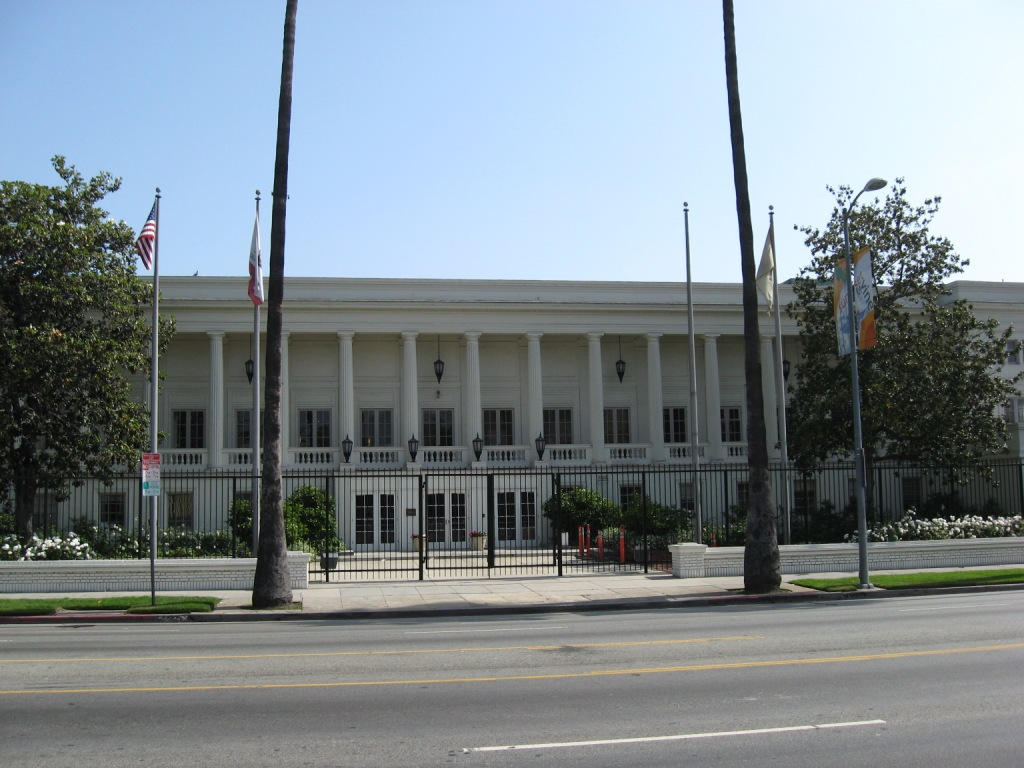

- Location within the Los Angeles metropolitan area Location within California Location within the United States
- Location: 5800 Sunset Boulevard; Hollywood, Los Angeles, California; 90028
- Coordinates: 34°5′51″N 118°19′2″W
- Built: 1919
- Architectural style: Classical Revival
- NRHP reference No.: 02001257
- LAHCM No.: 180

Significant dates
- Added to NRHP: November 1, 2002
- Designated LAHCM: September 21, 1977

The Old Warner Brothers Studio, now known as the Netflix Sunset Bronson Studios (formerly known as KTLA Studios and Tribune Studios), is a motion picture, radio and television production facility located on Sunset Boulevard in Hollywood, Los Angeles, California. The studio was the site where the first talking feature film, The Jazz Singer, was filmed in 1927.

Built in 1919, the main building fronting Sunset Boulevard became a bowling alley during a fallow time in the 1940s and 50s. In the mid-1950s, the studio lot was divided in two between KTLA television and Paramount Pictures. In 1963, the entire lot was taken over by new owner Gene Autry (as KTLA Studios) and became the home of KTLA Television: Golden West Broadcasters. In 1984, the lot was purchased by Tribune Company (as Tribune Studios), before finally coming under the ownership of Hudson Pacific Properties as Sunset Bronson Studios in 2008.

Due to its role in the history of the motion picture business, the site was designated as a Historic Cultural Landmark in LAHCM 1977. The distinctive Executive Office Building, part of Warner Brothers' original studio lot, was listed on the National Register of Historic Places in 2002.

== History ==
=== Warner Bros. Studio ===
The first studio facilities at 5800 Sunset Boulevard were built in 1919. They were acquired by Warner Bros. Pictures in the early 1920s and served as the company's executive offices and principal studios. In 1923, the Western Motion Picture Advertisers' Association held its "WAMPAS Frolic" at "the new Warner Brothers' studio on Sunset Boulevard" with "a great aggregation of film luminaries present." At the time, the studio was 350 feet (110 m) long and 200 feet (61 m) wide, "making it the largest covered-over stage in the world."

The site has been recognized as historically significant in large part due to its having been the location where the first talking feature-length motion picture, The Jazz Singer was filmed in 1927. It was also the studio for radio station KFWB in its early years as Warner Bros.' Los Angeles radio station.

In 1930, Warner Bros. announced the consolidation of its executive offices with those of First National Pictures, with the executive offices being moved from the Sunset Boulevard studio to the First National Studios in Burbank, California. Warner also began moving its filming to the Burbank studios in 1930 and 1931, though the Sunset Boulevard studios remained in active use during the 1930s both for motion picture filming and "phonograph recordings." Even after the move to Burbank, Warner continued to film motion pictures at its Sunset Boulevard studios in the 1930s. Warner's classic Looney Tunes and Merrie Melodies cartoons were produced at the Sunset studio facilities, from 1933 to 1955. In 1933, the Los Angeles Times reported that Warner Bros., "contrary to the popular view, is keeping its Sunset Boulevard studio in active use, with a company or two shooting there each day, and is also using the old Vitagraph plant." In December 1934, a fire destroyed 15 acres (61,000 m^{2}) of the Warner Bros. studios in Burbank, forcing the company to put its Sunset Boulevard studio back into full use. At the time of the fire, Jack L. Warner noted: "We have ample facilities at our Sunset Boulevard studio to take care of all immediate mechanical and constructional requirements."

By 1935, film historians were already noting the loss of the industry's early studio facilities, many of which had become ghost towns, but the Warner Bros. Sunset studios were still running at full production:

Warner Brothers Studio on Sunset Boulevard is far from dead. Probably more shooting is done there than at the First National plant Warners absorbed, for there are four modern stages there. But the ghost stage is the one on which history was made -- Stage 3, on which the first all-talking picture was made. It is a small stage, though and sentiment -- except as it applied to relatives who have to be on the payroll or else supported some other way -- has very little to do with making pictures.

=== Bowling alley and sports center ===
By 1937 Warner had closed the Sunset Boulevard studio and the property had been converted into a bowling alley and "sports center". The Los Angeles Times reported on the conversion of the historic studio as follows:

Note on the passing of an era: A painted sign hung over the front door is all there is to indicate that the Warner Bros. Sunset studio is no more. The birthplace of the Vitaphone is a 'sports center', and Stage One, where many of the first talkies retched their way into being, is a battery of badminton courts.

=== Paramount and KTLA television studios ===
In 1954, the Sunset Boulevard studio resumed its association with the entertainment business as television pioneer Klaus Landsberg, vice-president of Paramount Television Productions and general manager of KTLA, the first commercial television station west of the Mississippi, acquired the 10-acre (40,000 m^{2}) site as the future home of Paramount Television Productions. Paramount undertook a $2 million reconstruction program at the site.

In 1955 Paramount razed the older buildings at the studio. The Los Angeles Times noted at the time: "The birthplace of the talkies is disappearing into dust in Hollywood. Demolition crews are razing the older buildings of the old Warner Bros. Sunset Blvd. studio where the nasal voice of Al Jolson recorded on Vitaphone, first made talking pictures a commercial reality." At the time, Klaus Landsberg noted that "only the older buildings, including the historic Stage 1, are being destroyed, that newer facilities on the big lot are being renovated and reconditioned for the television operation." The old executive office building and large antenna which for years displayed the words "Warner Bros. Vitaphone" were preserved. However, the old theater where Warner executives watched screenings of the studio's latest works was destroyed.

In 1967, Gene Autry and his company, Golden West Broadcasters, acquired the old studio property from Paramount for $5 million. Golden West had previously acquired KTLA and had been leasing the space from Paramount.

In 1977, a celebration was held in Hollywood marking the 50th anniversary of the talking motion picture, including a parade of old cars ending at the KTLA studios where The Jazz Singer had been filmed 50 years earlier. The United States Postmaster General Benjamin F. Bailar and MPAA President Jack Valenti were on hand for the first-day issue ceremony of a commemorative stamp honoring the 50th anniversary of the first "talking picture." According to a Los Angeles Times report at the time, the 1977 parade carried former film greats "to Stage Six at KTLA, the same stage that was the site of The Jazz Singer". (Note: There is no ready explanation for the contradiction between this claim and the clearly expressed demolition intentions of the former studio owners; at the least, there is simply confusion between Stage 1 and Stage 6. Importantly, there is no mention of the “Jazz Singer” soundstage still being extant in the 1977 request of the Los Angeles Cultural Heritage Commission for historic designation of the property, only that the studio was the site of its filming; nor in the 1979 Los Angeles Times article criticizing the city's failure to preserve the early studio buildings of the motion picture industry.)

With the sale of KTLA from Golden West in 1982, the studios had three owners in the 1980s, with Kohlberg Kravis Roberts owning them from late 1982 until 1984, when Tribune Broadcasting acquired them.

=== Sunset Bronson Studios ===
In 2001, Tribune Entertainment Company, then the owner of the site, announced plans to overhaul the Sunset Boulevard studio facility, transforming it into the nation's first fully digital studio lot at a cost between $10 million and $20 million. In January 2008, Tribune Entertainment sold the studios to Hudson Capital, LLC, (now Hudson Pacific Properties) for $125 million. At the time of 2008 transition, productions at the studio facility included television series Judge Judy (1996–2021), Judge Joe Brown (1998–2013), Judge Alex (2010–2014), Divorce Court (1999–2018), Hannah Montana (2008–2011), Phenomenon (2007–2008), and others. Tribune Studios was then renamed Sunset Bronson Studios (the names a reference to the lot's corner of the intersecting streets) and became co-owned with nearby Sunset Gower Studios, the former Columbia Pictures studio lot. Let's Make a Deal was taped at the studio from 2010–2015.

Hudson Pacific Properties announced in 2014 plans to build a 14-story office tower next door to the landmark executive office building. This cast-in-place, cantilevered structure was designed by Gensler and built by McCarthy Building Companies, Inc. This anchors the expansion of Sunset Bronson Studios that also includes a 1,600-space parking structure and a five-story, 90,000-square-foot production building. An iconic 160-foot former radio tower was dismantled in December 2014 to make way for construction of an office building by Hudson Pacific Properties. After structural retrofitting and renovation, it was restored and relocated to its original location. The tower was erected in 1925 as one of two that served Warner Bros.' affiliate radio station, KFWB. While one of the towers was dismantled in 1950, this one was moved. In 1955, KTLA moved into the site and added its call sign and logo to the tower. Visible from the Hollywood Freeway, it was a notable landmark for over 60 years.

=== Netflix Hollywood Sunset Bronson Studios ===
The new office tower holds production offices for media production and subscription streaming service Netflix, which also now occupies most of the studio lot's sound stages for content production.

== Historic designation ==
In 1977, Los Angeles City Councilwoman Peggy Stevenson asked the Los Angeles Cultural Heritage Commission to declare the KTLA-KMPC production facilities a historic monument. The proposal was timed to coincide with the celebration of the 50th anniversary of the release of The Jazz Singer and was based on the facilities' role as "the site of the filming of the first feature film with synchronized dialogue, Warner Bros.' The Jazz Singer, filmed there in 1927 when the studio was the home of Warner Bros." The Commission followed the recommendation and declared the studio facilities at 5800 Sunset Boulevard a Historic Cultural Monument (HCM #180) in September 1977 as the "Site of the Filming of the First Talking Film." In 1979, the Los Angeles Times wrote an article criticizing the city's failure to preserve the early studio buildings of the motion picture industry and noted that only a handful of film industry sites, including the Old Warner Bros. Studio on Sunset, had been designated as Historic Cultural Monuments. The facilities were also listed on the National Register of Historic Places in 2002.

== See also ==
- Warner Bros. Studios, Burbank
- Warner Bros. Studios, Leavesden
- Los Angeles Historic-Cultural Monuments in Hollywood
- List of Registered Historic Places in Los Angeles
