= Petri Hawkins-Byrd =

American television personality

- Born: Petri Adonis Byrd; November 29, 1957 (age 68); Brooklyn, New York, U.S.
- Education: John Jay College of Criminal Justice (BS); Hostos Community College
- Occupations: Court officer; bailiff; actor; voice-over talent; writer
- Years active: 1996–present (television personality)
- Known for: Judge Judy (1996–2021); Tribunal Justice (2023–present)
- Height: 6 ft 2 in (188 cm)
- Spouse: Makita Bond (m. 2019)

Petri Hawkins-Byrd (born Petri Adonis Byrd; November 29, 1957), also known as Bailiff Byrd or simply Byrd, is an American court show bailiff, television personality, social media personality, actor, voice actor, writer, and former New York State Court Officer.

Hawkins-Byrd is best known for his sidekick role as Bailiff Byrd for the entire series run – totaling 25 seasons – of Nielsen top-rated courtroom television program Judge Judy. From his stint on Judge Judy, he is television's longest court show bailiff in history. Since October 2018, Hawkins-Byrd along with his wife, Makita Bond, have hosted their Facebook/YouTube talk show-like series entitled "Bonding with Byrd", with a new installment released every Tuesday.

It was announced in April 2022 that Hawkins-Byrd would return to the court show genre, resuming his televised bailiff duties in the then upcoming panel-based spin-off courtroom series Tribunal Justice. The series is created by Judy Sheindlin and her personal production team and features a three-judge panel.

== Youth, early adulthood and career beginnings ==
Petri Adonis Byrd was born on November 29, 1957, in the Crown Heights neighborhood of Brooklyn, New York. Taking to comedy and impressions from an early age, Hawkins-Byrd's father thought he was so entertaining and amusing as a child that he and his friends frequently called him up from prison just so they could hear him imitate celebrities. Growing up, he admired and imitated such celebrities as Flip Wilson, Dean Martin, Sammy Davis Jr., Ed Sullivan, Bill Cosby and others. Meanwhile, his stay-at-home mother held their family together. Hawkins-Byrd has described his mother as a strict disciplinarian who was insistent about her children achieving their education and treating people with respect. Of his childhood, Hawkins-Byrd has stated, "My escapes were going to school, reading, television and movies—anything that would take me out of the world I was in and put me in a world that could be."

After graduating from Eastern District High School in Brooklyn, he attended Hostos Community College in The Bronx. Although drawn to the idea of acting, he had also taken an interest in law while growing up. His interest in law emanated from his awareness of active Jim Crow laws and the civil rights movement during his youth, desiring to revolutionize racially discriminatory practices. With that, he started work as a court officer for the Brooklyn circuit of the New York City court system in the early 1980s.

In 1986, he was transferred to the family court division in Manhattan while also attending John Jay College of Criminal Justice. It was in this capacity that he met Judge Judy Sheindlin, who was the Supervising Family Court Judge for Manhattan. From 1986 through 1989, he worked in the Manhattan family court system as a courtroom officer on a rotating basis for varying judges, Sheindlin among many others. Recounting the times he was assigned to function as Sheindlin's bailiff in the Manhattan family court system, he commented, "I was never bored in her courtroom. Her get-to-the-point style didn't always sit well with the litigants, and there were times she was definitely glad to have me around."

In 1989, Hawkins-Byrd obtained a Bachelor of Science degree in Criminal Justice from John Jay College of Criminal Justice. That same year, his personal life changed radically: he and his wife, Felicia, separated and she moved with the couple's children to California. The couple tried to get their marriage back on track by participating in cross-country relationship counseling for five months. In 1990, he moved to San Mateo, California, to reunite with his family and reconcile with his wife. There, he accepted a job as a Special Deputy U.S. Marshall. In 1992, he made another career transition, becoming a student counselor at Monta Vista High School in Cupertino, California, remaining in this profession until 1996. As a side job during this time, Hawkins-Byrd also delivered pizza.

== Television career ==
=== Judge Judy (1996–2021) ===
In 1995, Hawkins-Byrd read a news article in a Liz Smith column about Sheindlin's new book, Don't Pee on My Leg and Tell Me It's Raining, as well as her then upcoming television court show project to be filmed in Los Angeles. He subsequently wrote Sheindlin a congratulatory letter, stating: "If you ever need a bailiff, my uniform still fits." After Sheindlin was feeling lack of chemistry between her and the test actor who performed as bailiff in her pilot episode, she phoned Hawkins-Byrd to offer him the role as bailiff in her courtroom series, which he accepted.

Byrd added "Hawkins" to his name when he joined the Judge Judy program as a salute to his late mother; Hawkins was her maiden name. In the program, Sheindlin referred to him simply as "Byrd," or less frequently "Officer Byrd." Hawkins-Byrd ended up performing as Judge Judy program bailiff for its entire series run of 25 seasons (1996–2021), making him the longest-serving television court show bailiff in history. Judge Judy remained the number 1 Nielsen-rated court show for its entire series run. In addition, the court show scored highest in daytime and syndication ratings for much of its first run, and won 3 Daytime Emmy Awards for Outstanding Legal/Courtroom Program.

In the series, Hawkins-Byrd took the role of Sheindlin's typically apathetic and lightly surly courtroom bailiff, as one who did not hesitate to assume a menacing presence with litigants when Sheindlin needed extra reinforcement. His main role in the series constituted introducing the cases (calling the parties forward, swearing the litigants, directing the courtroom audience when to rise and be seated, delivering the docket number and handing Sheindlin the case files), delivering materials between the judge and the litigants, dismissing the parties, and escorting them out once the case was complete. Opening and closing out the proceedings, each Judge Judy case began with Hawkins-Byrd making the statement of "Order! All Rise!" and ended with him stating, "Parties are excused. You may step out." This was later changed in the final season to "This case has concluded, parties are excused".

Limited in his speaking role, Hawkins-Byrd typically only commented when addressed by Sheindlin, supplying her with always curtly expressed nonchalance and lighthearted comments. He typically answered Sheindlin with simple, unadorned nonverbal expressions or exclamations. On numerous occasions over the course of the show's 25-year run, Byrd played a key role in the proceedings: he was frequently sought by Sheindlin to look up vehicle estimates from the Kelley Blue Book so that she could award the accurate judgment amount. Hawkins-Byrd's menacingly stern interjections for brasher litigants typically allowed Sheindlin reinforcement—her extra measure of coercion for litigants whose behavior she had trouble controlling on her own.

He was also tasked with controlling emotions that ran high among the parties and preventing potential altercations between the show's guests, typically by standing in-between them and the litigant podiums during the proceedings. Sheindlin frequently directed Hawkins-Byrd to expel litigants from the courtroom who acted in ways that she found inappropriate. He had been described by the Los Angeles Times as "the guard dog to the pit bull."

The court show was full of running gags involving Hawkins-Byrd. One of them involved his preoccupation with doing crossword puzzles during the proceedings. On occasion, he nonchalantly disagreed with Sheindlin when she bounced a question off of him for his agreement, often in relation to dressing down the parties. In another running gag, Sheindlin relied on his sophistication and academic knowledge, with Hawkins-Byrd interceding in areas with which she struggled: mathematics, new media, social media, current fads, etc.

He routinely delivered evidence to Sheindlin while having his head and eye contact directed away from her off to his sides, a trait observed publicly by Amy Poehler. A trademarked pet peeve of Hawkins-Byrd's was frequently having to block litigants from attempting to deliver evidence to Sheindlin themselves directly when they were unaware of the show's practice of handing evidence over to the bailiff. On the rare occasion, Sheindlin requested litigants to approach the bench, for example, to present evidence of bodily injuries or document clarifications.

Sheindlin often comically incorporated Hawkins-Byrd in the midst of her critiques and reprimands of the litigants, by sharing with the audience Officer Hawkins-Byrd's disapproving thoughts of the litigants without any communication of this from Hawkins-Byrd himself.

Of their on-screen relationship, Sheindlin had quipped, "We're like two old married people who have reached an accord. I can rely on him to be my protector. We don't have to exchange words—he knows what I'm thinking. People who watch us sense we have a history, and that is very important." Hawkins-Byrd described Sheindlin as "Blunt, witty, and sharp as a tack." Though when asked if he'd like to appear as a litigant on the program, he answered candidly (laughing), "Hell no. And I don't advise any of my friends to do so. Not if they want to maintain their love of the judicial system."

His duties and involvement were significantly reduced during the show's 25th and final season due to the COVID-19 pandemic. While he still introduced and closed out the cases, he no longer delivered evidence back and forth between Sheindlin and the parties and rarely communicated back and forth with Sheindlin. This was due to Sheindlin adjudicating the proceedings remotely from New York, while Hawkins-Byrd and the litigants still reported to the Los Angeles studio set.

=== Other entertainment media appearances ===
Hawkins-Byrd was also on the long running UPN show The Parkers. He portrayed a motorcycle Police Officer.

Hawkins-Byrd has participated in several movies and TV shows, including Tom Hennessy, Soul Lake (a 2015 independent horror film), Under the Palm Tree, American Skin, Sheen Talk, Inspirit, and Reesie's Pieces. By the same token, his other projects include Curb Your Enthusiasm (through the show visiting the Judge Judy program), A Deeper Love, Playing Mona Lisa, In the Eyes of a Killer, Saviour of None. He also played a judge role in the independent film End of the Law, which was shot in Sacramento, California, and premiered at the Crest Theatre on October 3, 2003.

In August 2018, Hawkins-Byrd appeared in an episode of medical advice talk show The Doctors, as a guest in the program to address concerns with his health as it relates to a spike in his glycated hemoglobin levels. In December 2019, he returned to disclose improvements in relation to diabetes and his overall health.

On August 5, 2021 Hawkins-Byrd performed in his first post-Judge Judy role as a guest on The Bold and the Beautiful. In the episode, Hawkins-Byrd plays a marriage officiant at the wedding of Steffy (played by Jacqueline MacInnes Wood) and Finn (played by Tanner Novlan).

Amid Byrd's much publicized exclusion from Sheindlin's spin-off series Judy Justice, which includes several former Judge Judy crew members, and the strong fan response received, he was reportedly approached by producers to present a program of his own that would see him as the mediator in some form. Hawkins-Byrd communicated an interest in the idea of acting as a television mediator.

Hawkins-Byrd landed a guest voice acting role in the Disney+ series The Proud Family: Louder and Prouder which premiered in 2022.

On April 28, 2022, it was announced that Hawkins-Byrd would hold the role of bailiff for a new court show produced by Sheindlin's team. The show, Tribunal Justice, premiered in 2023 and is presided over by former Hot Bench judges Tanya Acker and Patricia DiMango, along with Sheindlin's son, former district attorney Adam Levy.

Hawkins-Byrd has starred in several motion pictures, including Fear Pharm 2 (2021) and Amy's F*** It List (2023).

In 2024, Hawkins-Byrd appeared in an acting role as American basketball executive Alvin Gentry in the FX on Hulu television sports drama miniseries Clipped.

== Fan protests over perceived snubs ==
=== Judy Justice spin-off ===
A streaming court spin-off of Judge Judy, entitled Judy Justice, also hosted by Judy Sheindlin,, premiered on IMDb TV from Amazon Studios on November 1, 2021. In December 2020, during 25th season production of Judge Judy, Hawkins-Byrd noted publicly that he would be "honored" if invited back for the spin-off series in an interview with the Associated Press. However, Hawkins-Byrd was absent in the first trailer for the court show, released in September 2021, and a different bailiff was presented. Sheindlin additionally remarked that she was solo as far as a cast for the past 25 years and advertised Judy Justice as conversely having a cast. This was met with widespread outrage and criticism from Judge Judy fans.

Addressing fan complaints over his absence in an October 8, 2021, interview with Entertainment Weekly, Hawkins-Byrd stated that he was not asked to participate in Judy Justice. He added that he was not offered an audition nor communicated with at all in regards to the spin-off since Sheindlin first disclosed news of the court show in a March 2020 Ellen DeGeneres Show appearance—news that came as a surprise to him. It was not until July 2021, after the Judge Judy program ended and production of Judy Justice began was there a discussion, resulting from Hawkins-Byrd phoning Sheindlin at the behest of his wife Makita, a former Judge Judy producer who was requested to return for the spin-off series, but could not due to suffering from a cancerous brain tumor.

According to Hawkins-Byrd, when he asked Sheindlin if he would have a role in the streaming series, Sheindlin explained that he was not invited to take part in the program because his salary would have been too high. He described feeling perplexed by Sheindlin's statements, stating he never had the opportunity to discuss salary or lower salaries with anyone. He has described feeling "confused and dismayed" by Sheindlin's treatment. He added, however, that he was humbled by the show of support from fans. In her own statements to the press, Sheindlin remarked, "Byrd is terrific, and we had a great 25 year run. This is a whole new program with a whole new cast and an exciting energy."

In October 2021, following appearances on The Real, Entertainment Tonight Canada and The Black News Channel, Hawkins-Byrd quipped that Sheindlin's treatment of him was akin to Batman abandoning Robin. When questioned on the nature of his relationship with Sheindlin, he answered that he and Sheindlin never treated each other like friends throughout the court show's entire 25 season run, nor while working within the family court system prior to that. Rather, he described himself as only having a professional relationship with Sheindlin limited to behaving cordially around each other; using the analogy of what a relationship might be between a low-ranking mail clerk employed for Bill Gates at one of his companies. Elaborating, he pointed out that Sheindlin never once invited him to a lunch or celebratory get-together in all of the show's 25 seasons.

Hawkins-Byrd has stated that he welcomes a phone call from Sheindlin if she takes exception to any of his media appearances or opposes any of his public claims. He has added ultimately that he holds no grudges, is grateful to Sheindlin and wished her all the best with Judy Justice.

=== Hiring for another bailiff role ===
On April 28, 2022, it was announced that Hawkins-Byrd would be serving as bailiff for another court show produced and created by Sheindlin's team, also to be streamed on Amazon Freevee, entitled Tribunal Justice. The show is presided over by now former Hot Bench judges, Tanya Acker and Patricia DiMango, along with Sheindlin's son, former district attorney Adam Levy, with Byrd as the bailiff.

=== Sheindlin's 2019 Lifetime Achievement Award ===
In early November 2021, Hawkins-Byrd additionally shared that he felt snubbed when he was not allowed to present Sheindlin's Lifetime Achievement Award to her at the Daytime Emmy ceremony. He added that he was seated 15 to 20 rows back while Sheindlin sat with Judge Judy Executive Producer Randy Douthit in the front rows. Questioned about the matter, Sheindlin shared that it was Amy Poehler who called up the Television Academy and requested to present her with the award because she was a big fan. According to Hawkins-Byrd, however, Poehler later shared with him that she was equally perplexed over his exclusion from the ceremony.

== Off-air projects and activities ==
Hawkins-Byrd works part time as an event MC, guest speaker, charity supporter, and community activist. He has served as master of ceremonies and inspirational speaker and spends a lot of time motivating and building the lives of troubled youth. He is the national chairman of the O.K. Program, which addresses social issues concerning black youth and young black men. He is also on the board of the faith-based youth program Teen Center USA.

Hawkins-Byrd also operates a nonprofit mentoring program, entitled "Teach Them to Fish", focusing on physical, mental, social and spiritual growth. He indulges his creative side by writing poetry and screenplays, and has been known to read his poetry at bars and restaurants near his home.

Since October 2018, Hawkins-Byrd and his current wife, Makita Bond, have co-hosted a web series with a title that plays off their last names, "Bonding with Byrd". The couple posts new episodes on Tuesdays from Byrd's "Petri Hawkins-Byrd" Facebook page, and their joint "Bonding with Byrd" YouTube channel. Judge Lynn Toler, former court show arbitrator and longest reigning arbitrator of the courtroom series Divorce Court, formerly taped from the same studios as Judge Judy and thus a longtime friend of Byrd's, made an appearance on Bonding with Byrd on October 19, 2021. In the interview, Toler provided details on her various dissatisfactions leading to her resignation from Divorce Court and her current hosting role on Marriage Boot Camp.

In addition, Hawkins-Byrd and his wife founded a jointly owned production company that they named "Bonding with Byrd". He has shared that their production company is geared towards launching broadcast entertainment projects for streaming as well as developing and presenting stage plays.

== Personal life ==
In 2000, Hawkins-Byrd and his family moved from the San Francisco Bay Area to Elk Grove, California. The move was said to have resulted from Hawkins-Byrd and his family taking a liking to Elk Grove's affordable housing community and family-oriented atmosphere. Asked if he'd ever move to Los Angeles, California, where he reported to the set of Judge Judy for 25 years, he answered with an emphatic "No." He said he greatly disliked all the extravagance and glitz of Hollywood and preferred a simple, reflective life. He is a churchgoing Christian.

In 1980, Hawkins-Byrd married Felicia Hawkins, the mother of his children. The two separated in 1989, and Felicia moved to the West Coast with the couple's children. After marriage counselling Hawkins-Byrd and Hawkins reconciled, though not permanently. Altogether, he has four children, all adults and all from his first marriage to Felicia Hawkins.

Hawkins-Byrd married former fellow Judge Judy crew member Makita Bond Byrd on May 4, 2019. In 2012, prior to Bond becoming a producer for the court show, the two met on the Sunset Bronson Studios lot, where the Judge Judy program was filmed for its entire run. After going on a date to a comedy show at around that time, the two lost contact. In 2015, the two briefly reconnected through Hawkins-Byrd greeting Makita in text message, her replying but no further communications at that time.

In 2016, Bond landed a producer role on Judge Judy. She set up a surprise appearance as new producer on the set of the court show for Hawkins-Byrd, thinking he would remember who she was because of a Facebook request he sent her once she landed the position. He later admitted only pretending to remember her when they reunited, privately questioning a fellow Judge Judy crew member who she was. If not for a photo that Bond still had of the two of them on the Sunset Bronson Studio lot back in 2012, he has stated he would not have remembered who she was. The two married in 2019.

For much of the 25th and final season of Judge Judy, Hawkins-Byrd's personal life revolved around attending to Bond as she had suffered a cancerous brain tumor in the midst of the COVID-19 pandemic. During that season, she was heavily involved in chemotherapy. By April 2021 after Bond's surgery, 95 percent of the tumor was successfully removed. As reported on Bonding with Byrd in late October 2021, she is continuing with chemotherapy.
