= Adam's law =

Adam's Law may refer to either:

- Adam's Law, a court show presided over by Adam Levy, the son of Judy Sheindlin
- Law of total expectation, a result in probability theory, or
- Adam Walsh Child Protection and Safety Act, a statute regarding sex offender registration
