= 50th Daytime Emmy Awards =

- Date: December 15, 2023
- Location: Westin Bonaventure Hotel; Los Angeles, California, U.S.
- Presented by: National Academy of Television Arts and Sciences (NATAS)
- Hosted by: Kevin Frazier; Nischelle Turner

Highlights
- Most awards: General Hospital (6)
- Most nominations: Main: General Hospital (14); All: General Hospital (19)

Television/radio coverage
- Network: CBS; Paramount+
- Viewership: 2.073 million
- Produced by: Adam Sharp (NATAS); Lisa Armstrong (NATAS); David McKenzie (ATI)

The 50th Daytime Emmy Awards, presented by the National Academy of Television Arts and Sciences, honored the best in U.S. daytime television programming in 2022. The award ceremony was originally scheduled to be held on June 16, 2023, at the Westin Bonaventure Hotel in Los Angeles, but was postponed to December 15, 2023, due to the 2023 Hollywood labor disputes.

Kevin Frazier and Nischelle Turner, co-anchors of the syndicated entertainment news magazine Entertainment Tonight, hosted the ceremony for the second consecutive year.

The full list of nominations were announced on April 26, 2023, with some key categories unveiled on April 25 on programs such as Access Hollywood, Entertainment Tonight, Extra and E! News. ABC series General Hospital led the nominations with fourteen main nominations plus five creative arts nominations. After the 2023 Writers Guild of America strike began on May 2, the NATAS announced the postponement of the ceremony on May 16. Then after the 2023 SAG-AFTRA strike began on July 14, NATAS president Adam Sharp stated on July 24 that they had intended not to reschedule the ceremony until both strikes had ended. After the WGA Strike ended on September 27, and then the SAG-AFTRA on November 9, the NATAS confirmed on November 10 that the ceremony would be rescheduled to December 15.

CBS holds the U.S. rights to broadcast the ceremony and stream it on Paramount+.

== Category and rule changes ==
Following a realignment between the Daytime Emmy Awards and Primetime Emmy Awards for the 2022 ceremonies, the Academy of Television Arts & Sciences and the National Academy of Television Arts and Sciences announced in August 2022 that all categories for game shows would move to the primetime ceremony.

The maximum age limit for those eligible for Outstanding Younger Performer in a Drama Series has been lowered officially to 18.

The separate categories for "entertainment" and "informative" talk shows, and "entertainment" and "informative" talk show host, have been merged back into single talk show and talk show host categories, respectively. The categories have thus been re-named to Outstanding Daytime Talk Series and Outstanding Daytime Talk Series Host.

== Winners and nominees ==
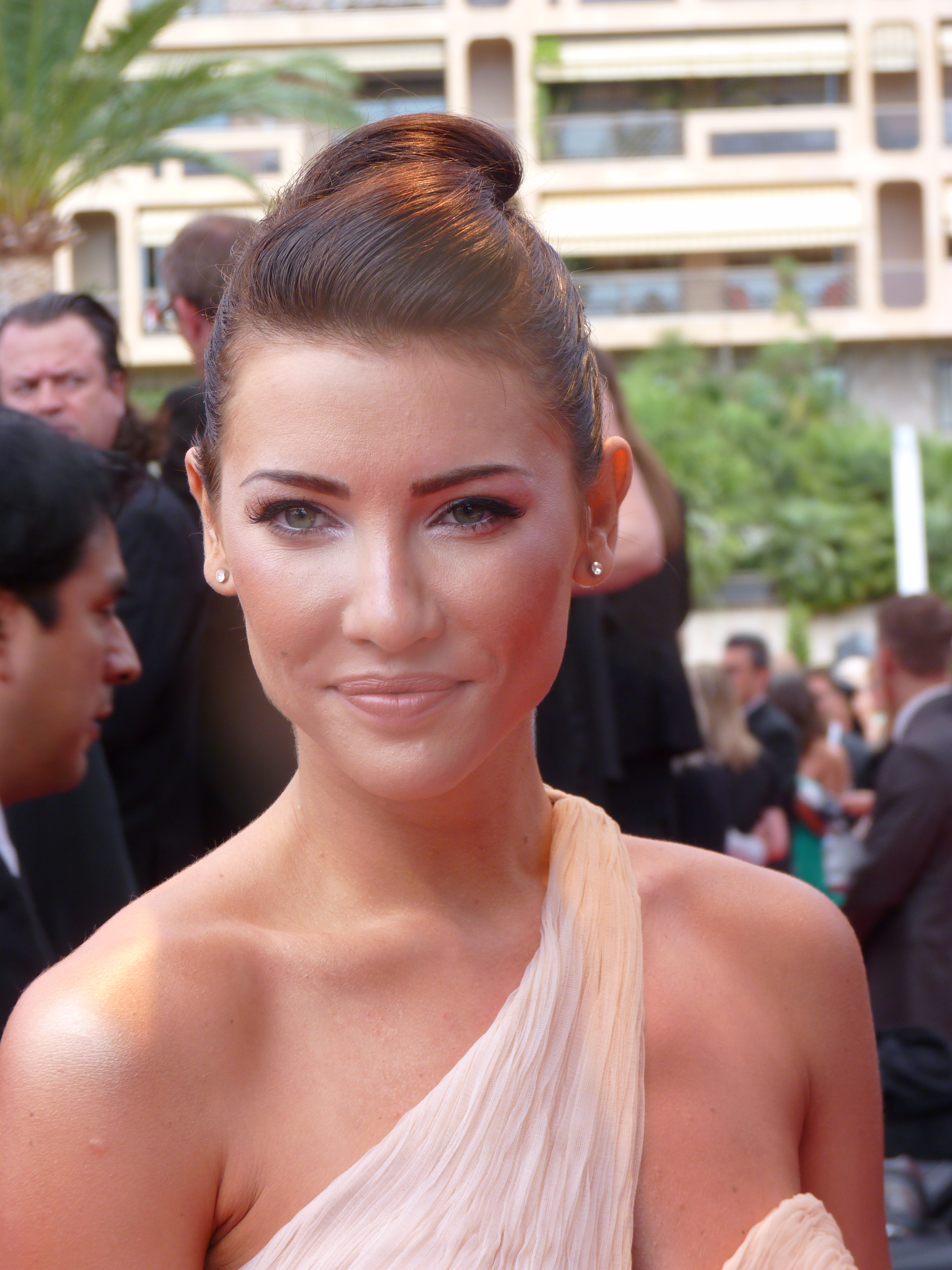
Jacqueline MacInnes Wood, Outstanding Performance by a Lead Actress in a Drama Series winner

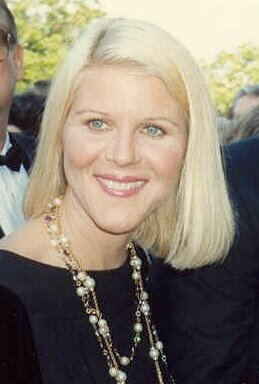
Alley Mills, Outstanding Guest Performer in a Drama Series winner

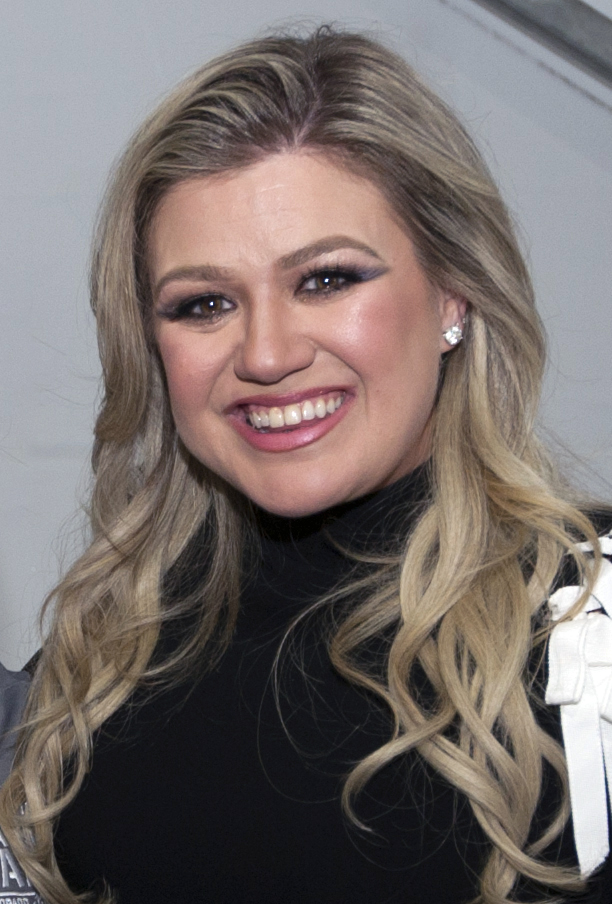
Kelly Clarkson, Outstanding Daytime Talk Series Host winner

The complete list of nominations for both the 50th Daytime Emmy Awards and the Creative Arts & Lifestyle Daytime Emmy Awards were announced on April 26, 2023.

=== Programming ===
Programming
Outstanding Drama Series: General Hospital (ABC); The Bay (Popstar! TV); The Bold and the Beautiful (CBS); Days of Our Lives (NBC / Peacock); The Young and the Restless (CBS)	Outstanding Daytime Talk Series: The Kelly Clarkson Show (Syndicated); The Drew Barrymore Show (Syndicated); The Jennifer Hudson Show (Syndicated); Live with Kelly and Ryan (Syndicated); Today with Hoda & Jenna (NBC)
Outstanding Legal/Courtroom Program: The People's Court (Syndicated); Caught in Providence (Syndicated); Hot Bench (Syndicated); Judge Steve Harvey (ABC); Judy Justice (Freevee)	Outstanding Entertainment News Series: Entertainment Tonight (Syndicated); Access Hollywood (NBC); E! News (E! Entertainment); Extra (Syndicated); Inside Edition (Syndicated)

=== Acting ===
Acting
Outstanding Performance by a Lead Actor in a Drama Series: Thorsten Kaye as Ridge Forrester on The Bold and the Beautiful (CBS); Maurice Benard as Sonny Corinthos on General Hospital (ABC); Peter Bergman as Jack Abbott on The Young and the Restless (CBS); Billy Flynn as Chad DiMera on Days of Our Lives (NBC / Peacock); Jason Thompson as Billy Abbott on The Young and the Restless (CBS)	Outstanding Performance by a Lead Actress in a Drama Series: Jacqueline MacInnes Wood as Steffy Forrester on The Bold and the Beautiful (CBS); Sharon Case as Sharon Newman on The Young and the Restless (CBS); Melissa Claire Egan as Chelsea Lawson on The Young and the Restless (CBS); Finola Hughes as Anna Devane on General Hospital (ABC); Michelle Stafford as Phyllis Summers on The Young and the Restless (CBS)
Outstanding Performance by a Supporting Actor in a Drama Series: Robert Gossett as Marshall Ashford on General Hospital (ABC); Nicholas Chavez as Spencer Cassadine on General Hospital (ABC); Chad Duell as Michael Corinthos on General Hospital (ABC); Daniel Feuerriegel as EJ DiMera on Days of Our Lives (NBC / Peacock); Jon Lindstrom as Dr. Kevin Collins/Ryan Chamberlain on General Hospital (ABC)	Outstanding Performance by a Supporting Actress in a Drama Series: Sonya Eddy as Epiphany Johnson on General Hospital (ABC) (Posthumous award); Krista Allen as Dr. Taylor Hayes on The Bold and the Beautiful (CBS); Stacy Haiduk as Kristen DiMera on Days of Our Lives (NBC / Peacock); Brook Kerr as Dr. Portia Robinson on General Hospital (ABC); Kelly Thiebaud as Dr. Britt Westbourne on General Hospital (ABC)
Outstanding Younger Performer in a Drama Series (Note: The original nomination announcement for this category included a fourth nominee, Victoria Grace (Wendy Shin, Days of Our Lives), who was subsequently withdrawn by the submitting program on April 28, 2023. Grace (born June 20, 2000) was ineligible to be nominated in the category, as she was older than 18 years of age on January 1, 2022, the date designated for 2023 entrants to qualify for eligibility under the revised age requirements.): Eden McCoy as Josslyn Jacks on General Hospital (ABC); Cary Christopher as Thomas DiMera on Days of Our Lives (NBC / Peacock); Henry Joseph Samiri as Douglas Forrester on The Bold and the Beautiful (CBS)	Outstanding Guest Performer in a Drama Series: Alley Mills as Heather Webber on General Hospital (ABC); Steve Burton as Harris Michaels on Beyond Salem: Chapter Two (Peacock); Cassandra Creech as Dr. Grace Buckingham on The Bold and the Beautiful (CBS); Robert Newman as Ashland Locke on The Young and the Restless (CBS); Kevin Spirtas as Dr. Craig Wesley on Days of Our Lives (NBC / Peacock)

=== Hosting ===
Hosting
Outstanding Daytime Talk Series Host
- Kelly Clarkson – The Kelly Clarkson Show (Syndicated)
  - Drew Barrymore – The Drew Barrymore Show (Syndicated)
  - Tamron Hall – Tamron Hall (Syndicated)
  - Kelly Ripa and Ryan Seacrest – Live with Kelly and Ryan (Syndicated)
  - Sherri Shepherd – Sherri (Syndicated)

=== Directing/Writing ===
Directing/Writing
Outstanding Directing Team for a Drama Series: General Hospital (ABC); The Bay (Popstar! TV); Days of Our Lives (NBC / Peacock); The Bold and the Beautiful (CBS); Beyond Salem: Chapter Two (Peacock); The Young and the Restless (CBS)	Outstanding Writing Team for a Drama Series: The Young and the Restless (CBS); The Bay (Popstar! TV); Days of Our Lives (NBC / Peacock); General Hospital (ABC); The Bold and the Beautiful (CBS); Beyond Salem: Chapter Two (Peacock)

== Lifetime Achievement Awards ==
The NATAS announced the following recipients of the Lifetime Achievement Awards on June 16, 2023:

- Susan Lucci, long-running actress on All My Children who played Erica Kane from 1970 until the series' cancellation in 2011.
- Maury Povich, host of the tabloid talk show Maury, airing from 1991 to 2022.
