= Daytime Emmy Award for Outstanding Legal/Courtroom Program =

Annual television award

- Awarded for: Outstanding Legal/Courtroom Program
- Country: United States
- Presented by: Academy of Television Arts & Sciences
- Currently held by: Judy Justice (2024)
- Website: emmyonline.org

The Daytime Emmy for Outstanding Legal/Courtroom Program is a category of the Daytime Emmy Awards dedicated to the court show genre. It was first introduced in 2008. Previously, court shows were grouped miscellaneously in the talk show category. In December 2023, The People's Court helmed by Marilyn Milian won its 5th Daytime Emmy Award, which gives it the most wins for the court show genre.

== Results details ==
In its first season, Cristina's Court became the first winner in this category in 2008. Cristina's Court went on to win 2 additional times consecutively, giving it the most wins for 9 years up until 2017, the longest length for holding the title of most wins. The court show was short-lived, however, only lasting 3 seasons and winning its final Daytime Emmy after its cancellation. In 2017, the Judge Judy courtroom series matched its number of wins, winning a 3rd time for the category.

When Judge Judy won for the first time in 2013, it was the first long-running, highly rated court show to win an Emmy. Previous to that, only short-lived, newly released court shows won this Emmy category, such as Cristina's Court. In addition, Last Shot with Judge Gunn won the award in 2012, which was only one season into its series run. This show was also cancelled early into its run, after only its 2nd season. Last Shot is the first nontraditional courtroom series to receive the award.

In 2018, Judge Mathis made history as the first court show with an African American jurist to win in this category. By June 2020, The People's Court won 3 times, equaling the number of wins of Cristina's Court and Judge Judy. In June 2021, The People's Court won its 4th Daytime Emmy Award, which officially gave it at that time the most wins for the court show genre.

When Judy Justice, Judy Sheindlin's spin-off court show, won the award in June 2022, she became the only television judge to win this category for more than one program (her two court shows).

=== Nominee/winner outline ===
==== 2000s ====
Year	Program	Network	Ref
2008 (35th)
2008 (35th)	Cristina's Court	FOX, Syndicated	
2008 (35th)	Judge David Young	Syndicated	
2008 (35th)	Judge Hatchett	Syndicated	
2008 (35th)	Judge Judy	Syndicated	
2008 (35th)	The People's Court	Syndicated	
2009 (36th)
2009 (36th)	Cristina's Court	FOX, Syndicated	
2009 (36th)	Family Court with Judge Penny	Syndicated	
2009 (36th)	Judge Hatchett	Syndicated	
2009 (36th)	Judge Judy	Syndicated	
2009 (36th)	The People's Court	Syndicated	

==== 2010s ====
Year	Program	Network	Ref
2010 (37th)
2010 (37th)	Cristina's Court	Syndicated	
2010 (37th)	Caso Cerrado	Telemundo	
2010 (37th)	Judge Judy	Syndicated	
2010 (37th)	Judge Jeanine Pirro	Syndicated	
2010 (37th)	The People's Court	Syndicated	
2011 (38th)
2011 (38th)	Judge Pirro	Syndicated	
2011 (38th)	Divorce Court	Syndicated	
2011 (38th)	Judge Judy	Syndicated	
2011 (38th)	The People's Court	Syndicated	
2011 (38th)	Swift Justice with Nancy Grace	Syndicated	
2012 (39th)
2012 (39th)	Last Shot with Judge Gunn	Syndicated	
2012 (39th)	America's Court with Judge Ross	Syndicated	
2012 (39th)	Judge Joe Brown	Syndicated	
2012 (39th)	We the People With Gloria Allred	Syndicated	
2013 (40th)
2013 (40th)	Judge Judy	Syndicated	
2013 (40th)	Last Shot with Judge Gunn	Syndicated	
2013 (40th)	The People's Court	Syndicated	
2014 (41st)
2014 (41st)	The People's Court	Syndicated	
2014 (41st)	Divorce Court	Syndicated	
2014 (41st)	Judge Judy	Syndicated	
2014 (41st)	Justice for All with Judge Cristina Perez	Syndicated	
2015 (42nd)
2015 (42nd)	The People's Court	Syndicated	
2015 (42nd)	Divorce Court	Syndicated	
2015 (42nd)	Judge Judy	Syndicated	
2015 (42nd)	The People's Court	Syndicated	
2016 (43rd)
2016 (43rd)	Judge Judy	Syndicated	
2016 (43rd)	Divorce Court	Syndicated	
2016 (43rd)	Hot Bench	Syndicated	
2016 (43rd)	Paternity Court	Syndicated	
2016 (43rd)	The People's Court	Syndicated	
2017 (44th)
2017 (44th)	Judge Judy	Syndicated	
2017 (44th)	Lauren Lake's Paternity Court	Syndicated	
2017 (44th)	The People's Court	Syndicated	
2017 (44th)	Hot Bench	Syndicated	
2017 (44th)	Judge Mathis	Syndicated	
2018 (45th)
2018 (45th)	Judge Mathis	Syndicated	
2018 (45th)	Divorce Court	Syndicated	
2018 (45th)	Couples Court with the Cutlers	Syndicated	
2018 (45th)	The People's Court	Syndicated	
2018 (45th)	Judge Judy	Syndicated	
2018 (45th)	Justice with Judge Mablean	Syndicated	
2019 (46th)
2019 (46th)	Lauren Lake's Paternity Court	Syndicated	
2019 (46th)	Judge Mathis	Syndicated	
2019 (46th)	Couples Court with The Cutlers	Syndicated	
2019 (46th)	The People's Court	Syndicated	
2019 (46th)	Judge Judy	Syndicated	

==== 2020s ====
Year	Program	Network	Ref
2020 (47th)
2020 (47th)	The People's Court	Syndicated	
2020 (47th)	Judge Judy	Syndicated	
2020 (47th)	Judge Mathis	Syndicated	
2020 (47th)	Lauren Lake's Paternity Court	Syndicated	
2020 (47th)	Hot Bench	Syndicated	
2021 (48th)
2021 (48th)	The People's Court	Syndicated	
2021 (48th)	Judge Judy	Syndicated	
2021 (48th)	Lauren Lake's Paternity Court	Syndicated	
2021 (48th)	Divorce Court	Syndicated	
2021 (48th)	Caught in Providence	Syndicated	
2022 (49th)
2022 (49th)	Judy Justice	IMDbTV	
2022 (49th)	Caught in Providence	Facebook Watch	
2022 (49th)	Judge Mathis	Syndicated	
2022 (49th)	The People's Court	Syndicated	
2023 (50th)
2023 (50th)	The People's Court	Syndicated	
2023 (50th)	Hot Bench	Syndicated	
2023 (50th)	Judge Steve Harvey	ABC	
2023 (50th)	Judy Justice	Freevee	
2023 (50th)	Caught in Providence	Syndicated	
2024 (51st)
2024 (51st)	Judy Justice	Amazon Freevee	
2024 (51st)	Hot Bench	Syndicated	
2024 (51st)	Justice For The People with Judge Milian	Syndicated	
2024 (51st)	The People's Court	Syndicated	
2024 (51st)	We The People with Judge Lauren Lake	Syndicated	
2025 (52nd)
2025 (52nd)	Hot Bench	Syndicated	
2025 (52nd)	Judy Justice	Amazon Freevee	
2025 (52nd)	Justice For The People with Judge Milian	Syndicated	
2025 (52nd)	America's Court with Judge Ross	Syndicated	
2025 (52nd)	We The People with Judge Lauren Lake	Syndicated	
2025 (52nd)	Divorce Court	Syndicated	

== Multiple wins ==
5 wins

- The People's Court

3 wins

- Cristina's Court
- Judge Judy

2 wins

- Judy Justice
