= Adam's Law =

American reality court show

- Genre: Arbitration-based reality court show
- Created by: Judy Sheindlin
- Directed by: Randi Clarke Lennon
- Presented by: Adam Levy
- Narrated by: Judy Sheindlin (opening); Steve Kamer
- Country of origin: United States
- Original language: English
- No. of seasons: 1
- No. of episodes: 84

Production
- Executive producers: Judy Sheindlin; Roland Tieh
- Production locations: Stamford Studios; Stamford, Connecticut
- Production companies: Big Ticket Television; Queen Bee Productions; CBS Media Ventures

Original release
- Network: Syndication
- Release: September 14, 2026 – present

Related
- Hot Bench; Judge Judy

Adam's Law is an American arbitration-based reality court show created by television personality and former Judge Judy Sheindlin. The series is presided over by Sheindlin's son Judge Adam Levy, attorney and former district attorney. It premiered in national syndication on September 14, 2026, through CBS Media Ventures—30 years from when his mother began her preeminent courtroom television career with Judge Judy in September 1996.

The program features Levy presiding over legal disputes in a courtroom setting and rendering verdicts on cases presented before him. Levy brings more than 25 years of legal experience to the program, having served two terms as district attorney of Putnam County, New York, and previously serving as a presiding judge on the ongoing courtroom series Tribunal Justice (2023–present) for 3 seasons and Justice on Trial (8-episode one-season Prime Video series).

On November 19, 2026, the show was renewed for a second season.

== Origins ==
Adam's Law marks Levy's transition from a three-judge panel court show to leading his own courtroom program. For 3 seasons from 2023 through 2026, Levy served alongside judges Patricia DiMango and Tanya Acker as one of the three presiding judges on Tribunal Justice. In the series, Levy presided alongside Sheindlin's longtime Judge Judy bailiff, Petri Hawkins-Byrd. Following the conclusion of Tribunal Justice's third season on June 19, 2026, Levy exited the ongoing panel-based court show to preside over Adam's Law.

Adam's Law is being launched as part of Sheindlin's transition away from on-camera courtroom television. On September 9, 2026, Sheindlin announced the end of her 30-year court television career would arrive on October 22, 2026, with the series finale of Judy Justice (2021–2026). As part of her retirement announcement, she highlighted her intention of passing the baton onto her son with Adam's Law. Sheindlin serves as the series' creator and executive producer. The program is produced by CBS Media Ventures and Queen Bee Productions, with Sheindlin and Roland Tieh serving as executive producers and Sandra Allen serving as co-executive producer.

== Cast ==
- Adam Levy — presiding judge
- Rodney Young — bailiff
- Jessica Ramirez — law clerk

== Broadcast ==
The first season of Adam's Law premiered in national syndication on September 14, 2026, distributed by CBS Media Ventures.
