= Judy Blum =

Judy Blum may refer to:

- Judy Blume (born 1938), American children's author
- Judy Sheindlin (born 1942 as Judy Blum), American television judge known as Judge Judy
