= Gary Busey: Pet Judge =

American web television series

- Genre: Nontraditional court show; Comedy
- Created by: Jack Vaughn
- Written by: Justin Wright Neufeld; Galloway Allbright
- Directed by: Jack Vaughn
- Starring: Gary Busey; Mike E. Winfield; Ian Abramson
- Narrated by: Shadoe Stevens
- Country of origin: United States
- Original language: English
- No. of seasons: 1
- No. of episodes: 6

Production
- Editor: Hanne Anderson
- Running time: 23–27 minutes
- Production companies: Vaughn Land And Cattle; Amazon Studios

Original release
- Network: Amazon Prime Video
- Release: May 25, 2020

Gary Busey: Pet Judge is an American streaming nontraditional comedy court miniseries starring Gary Busey. It was created and directed by Jack Vaughn. Written by Justin Wright Neufeld and Galloway Allbright, the show features Busey adjudicating pet-related disputes within a courtroom setting.

Alongside Busey, the show stars comedian Mike E. Winfield as a bailiff and Ian Abramson as a post-trial interviewer, and was narrated by Shadoe Stevens. The show premiered on May 25, 2020, and consists of six episodes.

== See also ==
- Judge Steve Harvey (2022–present) originally a miniseries court show that because of its reception has earned more seasons, hosted by comedian Steve Harvey
- Judy Justice (2021–present) another streaming court show, which is arbitrated by popular Judge Judy Sheindlin (famed for Judge Judy)
- Eye for an Eye – a court show produced by National Lampoon, Inc.
