= Tribunal Justice =

American reality court show

- Genre: Arbitration-based reality court show
- Created by: Judy Sheindlin
- Presented by: Tanya Acker; Patricia DiMango; Adam Levy
- Narrated by: Moe Daniels; Gregg Marx
- Country of origin: United States
- Original language: English
- No. of seasons: 3
- No. of episodes: 290

Production
- Executive producers: Sandra Allen; Scott Koondel; Judy Sheindlin; Roland Tieh
- Producer: Chantay Brown
- Production location: Los Angeles, California
- Running time: 22–30 minutes
- Production companies: Sox Entertainment; Amazon MGM Studios

Original release
- Network: Amazon Freevee
- Release: June 9 – December 1, 2023
- Network: Amazon Prime Video
- Release: January 27, 2025 – present

Tribunal Justice is an American arbitration-based reality court show created by Judge Judy Sheindlin. The first season premiered on Amazon Freevee on June 9, 2023. The second season premiered on January 26, 2025, on Amazon Prime Video following the discontinuation of Freevee.

== Summary ==
A panel of three legal professionals collectively adjudicates and debates real cases in Los Angeles. The original three-judge panel consisted of civil attorney Tanya Acker, former Brooklyn judge Patricia DiMango, and former prosecutor Adam Levy. The show is very similar to the earlier Judy Sheindlin-created Hot Bench, on which Acker and DiMango served on from its 2014 premiere until 2022. Levy is the son of show creator Judith Sheindlin and her first husband Ronald Levy.

In March 2026, it was announced that Levy would be departing Tribunal Justice following its third season. CBS Media Ventures, who distributed his mother's series as well as Hot Bench, struck a deal with Sheindlin's production company to launch Adam's Law, which was also created by Sheindlin, in the fall of 2026.

== Cast ==
=== Host judges ===
==== Tanya Acker ====
Tanya Acker was born March 13, 1970, in Los Angeles. She graduated from Howard University with a Bachelor of Arts in 1992 and Yale Law School with her Juris Doctor in 1995. Following law school, she served as a law clerk for Dorothy Wright Nelson and completed a fellowship at the Office of the Solicitor General. She has since gone into private practice as a civil litigation attorney.

In addition to practicing law, Acker has been a television commentator on programs on CNN, ABC, Fox News, CNBC, and Sky News.

==== Patricia DiMango ====
Patricia DiMango was born on May 19, 1953. She graduated from Brooklyn College with a bachelor's degree in psychology and education, a master's degree from Columbia University in developmental psychology, and a Juris Doctor from St. John's University School of Law. She was an Assistant District Attorney for Kings County, New York and an adjunct associate professor at St. John's University.

==== Adam Levy (2023–26) ====
Adam Levy was born in October 1968 to Judy Sheindlin and her first husband, Ronald Levy. He graduated from Hofstra University in 1992. He was previously the district attorney for Putnam County, New York. His daughter, Sarah Rose, is a law clerk on Judy Justice. Following completion of the 3rd season of the court show, Adam Levy exited to preside over his own courtroom series, Adam's Law, set to premiere on September 14, 2026.

=== Supporting cast ===
==== Cassandra Britt, bailiff ====
Cassandra Britt is a retired officer from the Los Angeles Police Department, where she served in several roles over her 31-year career. She has a bachelor's degree from California State University, Long Beach.

==== Petri Hawkins-Byrd, bailiff ====
Petri Hawkins-Byrd is a former New York State Court Officer and U.S. marshal. He served as the court bailiff on Judge Judy from 1996–2021, which makes him the longest-serving television bailiff. He graduated from John Jay College of Criminal Justice.

== Production ==
In April 2023, it was announced that Tribunal Justice would premiere on June 9, 2023, in the United States, United Kingdom, Germany, and Austria. The show was created and is executive produced by Judge Judy Sheindlin (of Judge Judy and Judy Justice), who had previously created the similarly formatted Hot Bench for the syndication market; Sheindlin was inspired by witnessing an Irish three-judge tribunal while on vacation in creating both shows.

The titular tribunal features former New York Supreme Court justice Patricia DiMango, Los Angeles civil litigator Tanya Acker, and former New York district attorney Adam Levy (Sheindlin's son), and bailiffs Petri Hawkins Byrd and Cassandra Britt. DiMango and Acker previously presided over the tribunal on Hot Bench. Byrd previously served as Sheindlin's Bailiff on Judge Judy. In October 2023, it was announced that Tribunal Justice had been renewed for a second season with Roland Tieh joined as showrunner.

== Release ==
The first three episodes of the series premiered on Amazon Freevee on June 9, 2023, with new episodes released every weekday through December 1, 2023.

The series made its linear premiere via Sox Entertainment syndication on September 8, 2025, cleared in 95% of the country.

The second season premiered on Amazon Prime Video on January 27, 2025.

== Episodes ==
Season	Episodes	Originally released		
Season	Episodes	First released	Last released	Network
1	130	June 9, 2023	December 1, 2023	Amazon Freevee
2	80	January 27, 2025	May 16, 2025	Amazon Prime Video
3	80	March 2, 2026	June 19, 2026	Amazon Prime Video
