= Adam Levy =

Adam Levy may refer to:

- Adam Levy (musician) (born 1966), American jazz guitarist
- Adam Levy (actor) (born 1970), British actor
- Adam Levy (judge) (born 1968), American attorney and judge
