= Adam Levy (judge) =

American attorney and prosecutor (born 1968)

- Born: October 8, 1968 (age 58); New York City, U.S.
- Education: University at Albany (BA); Hofstra University (JD)
- Occupations: Attorney; prosecutor; television personality
- Political party: Republican
- Spouse: Lori Leichtman (m. 1995)
- Children: 3
- Parents: Ronald Levy (father); Judy Sheindlin (mother)
- Relatives: Jamie Hartwright (sister)

Adam Levy (born October 8, 1968) is an American attorney, former prosecutor, television personality, and former elected district attorney. He served two terms as the District Attorney of Putnam County, New York, from 2007 to 2015. He later became one of the judges on the Prime Video courtroom series Tribunal Justice and is the host and presiding judge of the syndicated courtroom television series Adam's Law, which premiered on September 14, 2026. Levy is the son of television personality and former New York family court judge Judy Sheindlin and her first husband, Ronald Levy. He is the stepson of attorney and television personality Jerry Sheindlin. After graduating from law school, he was an assistant district attorney in Suffolk County, New York, before entering private practice.

== Early life and education ==
Levy was born in October 1968 to Ronald Levy and Judith Sheindlin in New York City, New York. He has one sibling from his mother's first marriage, Jamie Hartwright. Sheindlin subsequently married Judge Jerry Sheindlin in 1978.

Levy grew up in the Bronx. He graduated from the University at Albany in 1989 and from Hofstra Law School in 1992. Levy initially considered taking a year away from the legal profession after graduation, but ultimately began his legal career with the Suffolk County District Attorney's Office at the behest of his mother.

== Legal career ==
After graduating from law school, Levy became an assistant district attorney in Suffolk County, New York. His work included prosecuting cases involving violent and nonviolent offenses, including cases involving women and children who were victims of physical and sexual assault. Levy subsequently entered private practice and co-founded the law firm, Levy & Santoro, in Carmel, New York. His practice included criminal and matrimonial matters.

In 2007, Levy was elected District Attorney of Putnam County, New York. He was reelected in 2011 and served a total of two terms, leaving office in 2015. During his tenure, Levy established programs addressing issues including bullying, cyberbullying, prescription-drug abuse, and heroin abuse. He also established the Putnam County Intelligence Committee, intended to facilitate cooperation and information-sharing among law-enforcement agencies.

Levy never served as a judge during his legal career.

=== Defamation lawsuit ===
In 2013, while serving as district attorney, Levy became involved in a public dispute with Putnam County Sheriff Donald B. Smith concerning the investigation of a sexual assault case. The case involved Alexandru Ionut Hossu, who in 2010 was accused of the rape of a then 12-year-old girl. Smith accused Levy of improperly interfering with the investigation, which Levy denied.

Levy subsequently filed a defamation lawsuit against Smith, initially seeking $5 million in damages. In 2017, the dispute ended in a settlement under which Smith agreed to pay Levy $150,000 and issue a retraction concerning statements made about Levy's conduct. CBS News erroneously reported that Levy won the case.

== Television career ==
=== Tribunal Justice ===
Following his career as a prosecutor and private attorney, Levy entered television courtroom programming. In 2023, he joined the cast of Tribunal Justice, a Prime Video courtroom series created by his mother, Judith Sheindlin. Levy served as one of three judges on the program alongside Tanya Acker and Patricia DiMango. The program gave Levy his first regular television judging role and placed him alongside several other former legal professionals associated with Sheindlin's courtroom television franchise.

=== Adam's Law ===
In December 2025, CBS Media Ventures announced that they were launching a new sydnicated courtroom series, titled Adam's Law, starring Levy. The program is produced by CBS Media Ventures and Queen Bee Productions, with Judith Sheindlin and Roland Tieh serving as executive producers. In September 2026, Shiendlin said that she believed Levy was ready to lead a television program on his own after years of legal and television experience. The series premiered on September 14, 2026. The program features Levy adjudicating small-claims disputes in a format that combines legal arguments, evidence and personal testimony.

== Personal life ==
Levy is married to Lori Leichtman. The couple have three children, including Sarah Rose Levy, who has worked as a law clerk on Judy Justice. Levy has spoken publicly about the influence of his mother on his career while emphasizing his own professional experience; Levy credits her with encouraging independence and a strong work ethic.

== See also ==
- Judy Sheindlin
- Judge Judy
- Judy Justice
- Hot Bench
