= Judge Steve Harvey =

American reality comedy court show

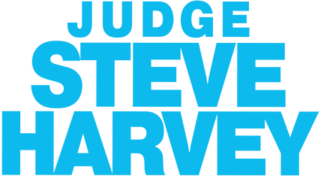
- Genre: Arbitration-based reality court comedy show
- Directed by: Ryan Polito; Stephanie Medina
- Presented by: Steve Harvey
- Starring: Rubin Ervin; Nancy Price
- Narrated by: Debra Wilson
- Country of origin: United States
- Original language: English
- No. of seasons: 2
- No. of episodes: 34

Production
- Executive producers: Steve Harvey; Brandon Williams; Jesse Ignjatovic; Jared Morrell; Evan Prager; Myeshia Mizuno
- Producers: Lisa Allen; Gerald Jones
- Production locations: Trilith Studios, Fayetteville, Georgia
- Running time: 42 minutes
- Production companies: East 112; Den of Thieves

Original release
- Network: ABC
- Release: January 4, 2022 – August 13, 2024

Judge Steve Harvey is an American arbitration-based reality court comedy show hosted by Steve Harvey. The series premiered on ABC on January 4, 2022. Unlike most courtroom programming which airs in the daytime television bracket, Judge Steve Harvey airs in prime time. Also in contrast to most courtroom programming, which typically airs a new episode for each weekday, Judge Steve Harvey takes the approach of a sitcom television schedule, airing one new episode per week.

Casting for Judge Steve Harvey was conducted in September 2021 and filming for the series ran from October to November 2021. The show is produced by Den of Thieves in association with Disney Branded Television.

In April 2022, the series was renewed for a second season, which premiered on May 9, 2023.

== On-air feel and format ==
=== Episode openings ===
The show take place in a courtroom set, Harvey's bench extends from one side to the other, taking up most of the courtroom. Harvey wields a gold-colored gavel. As part of the title sequence, Harvey introduces himself and declares his judicial handling is without the need of legal degrees or law backgrounds, rather than his unique brand of common sense. Harvey adds that how he has transcended the wearing of a judge's robe, instead, donning a swanky all-black suit. An entrance into the courtroom follows the title sequence in which the walls of the courtroom separate for Harvey to enter through; smoke fills the room. Rubin Ervin introduces Harvey with music.

=== Case proceedings ===
Proceedings begin with Harvey instructing litigants that they have thirty seconds to summarize their case for the viewing audience before he moves deeper into interrogating the parties. Before and during the proceedings, the audience is heard freely hooting, hollering, standing, cheering, whooping, and booing at the proceedings. This is all prompted by Harvey's satire, derision, and ridicule at the parties before him. Harvey spends most of the cases engaged in his antics and mischievous behaviors, such as writing out signs and raising them up in the air, in one case, raising up a "WTF" sign at a misbehaved litigant repeatedly speaking out of turn. Harvey's mischievous approach, teasing, and satire typically expose the follies and foolishness of the guests in regards to their testimonies.

Demanding acknowledgment for the parody nature of the program, Harvey openly jeers at guests who take the proceedings too seriously by acting as though they are in a real court of law, Harvey going so far as scolding the parties to stop pretending that they are in a real court and to remember and recognize they are in a TV studio. Establishing some early catchphrases, Harvey follows each verdict with the remark, "And that’s the way I see it!" Harvey routinely acknowledges with pride that his verdicts are from his gut feelings, based on his own internal logic as opposed to any particular code of law.

== Judge Steve Harvey ==
=== Judicial handling approach ===
Unlike most other television court show arbitrators, such as Judy Sheindlin (Judge Judy and Judy Justice), Greg Mathis (Judge Mathis), Marilyn Milian (The People's Court), etc., Harvey has never held any judgeship or legal licenses and has no jurisprudence background, which is typically mandated by television court show programming. To compensate for this, however, the miniseries has billed itself as "Harvey playing by his own rules, basing his courtroom on his own life experiences and some good old common sense".

Judge Steve Harvey has been advertised as, "Harvey taking on a variety of conflicts and characters in his courtroom, from small claims to big disputes and everything in between". Deviating from the standard as far as judicial wear as well, Harvey is seen donning a black dress shirt, suit jacket, tie and dress pants while presiding.

In contrast to most programming in the arbitration-based reality show genre which takes to a more serious, businesslike format, Harvey seeks to exude comedy in his Judge Steve Harvey series. Another court show popular for its amusement, Judge Mathis, has balanced humor with a businesslike approach to justice, contrary to Harvey's comedic and informal approach, filling airtime with his mischievousness and antics and his live audience contributing to that. This all takes the same approach Harvey has used to skyrocket the game show Family Feud to top-rated daytime ratings success. Harvey drew considerable attention to the series for his relentless derision and scoffing humor, double takes and slow-burn reactions, such that the game show began competing in Nielsen ratings for top spot against Judge Judy (a typical daytime ratings leader for many years of its original run) over the 2020–21 television year. Following the release of a trailer for the series on December 1, Harvey's arbitration handling approach was likened to his game show hosting approach in media reports. Characterizing his judicial approach, Harvey stated:

I knew I had to just be myself. Most judges are interested in the law: these are the facts, and that’s it. I’m going to dig up the story behind why people came to court versus what they’re in court for. I lean on decades of experience dealing with all types of situations and people, and I rely on my street savvy, common sense and humor to get it done.

— Harvey

== Production ==
=== Filming location ===
Judge Steve Harvey is filmed at the Trilith Studios in Fayetteville, Georgia. Located at 461 Sandy Creek Road, the Trillith Studios have been characterized as "sprawling and high-tech". The studios are currently owned by River’s Rock LLC, an Atlanta-based investment service company that develops and funds studio facilities for the production of film, television, music, and video games. Fayetteville lies 22 miles south of Atlanta, which is considered an important hub for television and film production.

=== Inside details and systems ===
Despite the comedic nature of the program and Harvey's playful sternness and metafiction-style reprimands of his guests not to take the proceedings seriously as a court of law, the series is unscripted with individuals who have filed legal grievances in actual courts. Those individuals were later invited to the program by producers to have their disputes heard by Steve Harvey.

As is the case among the rest of arbitration court shows in which litigants cannot pursue a claim once ruled on by the presiding arbiter, rulings on Judge Steve Harvey are said to likely take the same legally binding format. That said, there is no official confirmation of this. Whether Harvey rules in favor of the plaintiff or defendant, the outcomes are considered a "win-win for everyone involved" because none of the litigants are responsible for paying the judgments. According to the show's official website, "all awards/judgments are paid by production".

== Cast ==
=== Main ===
- Steve Harvey as himself (Judge)

The bailiff on the series is former Douglas County, Georgia bailiff Nancy Price. The audience warm-up, Rubin Ervin, appears at the start of each episode and also instructs the audience to rise when Harvey makes his entrance.

=== Guest stars ===
- Scott Steiner as himself
- Sunkee Angel as herself
- Colbert Minga as Derek Porter
- J. J. Dillon as himself
- Kevin E Tribble as Ok Mr Hightower
- Ronnie Gossett as himself
- Tyrone Evans Clark as himself
- Sham “Lady Sham” Ibrahim as herself
- Kevin Sullivan as himself
- Tiffani Brooks as herself
- Daphne Spring as herself

== Episodes ==
=== Series overview ===
Season	Episodes	Originally released	
Season	Episodes	First released	Last released
1	12	January 4, 2022	April 26, 2022
2	22	May 9, 2023	August 13, 2024

=== Season 1 (2022) ===
No. overall	No. in season	Title	Original release date	Prod. code	U.S. viewers (millions)
1	1	"Not Mending Fences"	January 4, 2022	101	5.16
2	2	"Stuck on Stupid"	January 11, 2022	102	4.46
3	3	"Ok Mr. Hightower!"	January 18, 2022	103	4.53
4	4	"Problem with Panda"	January 25, 2022	104	4.18
5	5	"Let's Not Drag Me Into This"	February 1, 2022	105	4.00
6	6	"See What Happened Was..."	March 22, 2022	106	3.43
7	7	"A Sprinkle of Shady"	March 29, 2022	107	3.26
8	8	"You Cause the Wreck, You Cut the Check"	April 5, 2022	108	3.48
9	9	"No Pics, No Proof"	April 12, 2022	109	3.62
10	10	"I've Learned Absolutely Nothing"	April 19, 2022	110	3.45
11	11	"What the Hell Is Going On?"	April 26, 2022	111	3.33
12	12	"Sister from Another Mister"	April 26, 2022	112	2.69

=== Season 2 (2023–24) ===
No. overall	No. in season	Title	Original release date	Prod. code	U.S. viewers (millions)
13	1	"Everybody Plays the Fool"	May 9, 2023	202	2.70
14	2	"Even Though My Aunt Is Dead, I Need My Bread!"	May 16, 2023	203	2.52
15	3	"How Long Have You Been Stupid?"	May 23, 2023	214	2.24
16	4	"Run Me My Coins"	June 14, 2023	204	3.16
17	5	"Stay Lit or Get Gone"	June 21, 2023	207	3.05
18	6	"You Ain't Slicker Than the Slick"	June 28, 2023	201	2.89
19	7	"Did I Black Out?"	July 5, 2023	213	2.77
20	8	"Delayed Don't Mean Denied"	July 26, 2023	205	3.01
21	9	"Don't Drag the Lord in This"	August 2, 2023	209	2.93
22	10	"Sushi in Vegas Is Like the Wing of Atlanta"	August 16, 2023	206	3.16
23	11	"Current Friend Count: Zero"	February 7, 2024	208	1.58
24	12	"You Pay for Them Yams"	February 14, 2024	210	1.63
25	13	"You Don't Want This!"	February 21, 2024	211	1.44
26	14	"Why Are You Always Lying?"	February 28, 2024	212	1.55
27	15	"You Would Make An Excellent Judge"	March 6, 2024	215	1.49
28	16	"Don't Get in Grown Folk Business"	March 13, 2024	216	1.35
29	17	"Mistakes Happen"	July 16, 2024	217	2.14
30	18	"Divine Vine"	July 23, 2024	218	1.81
31	19	"Manipulated and Bamboozled"	July 30, 2024	219	1.84
32	20	"A Whole Other Kind of Pain and Suffering"	August 6, 2024	220	1.92
33	21	"I'm in an Inter-spacial Relationship"	August 13, 2024	221	2.21
34	22	"A Big Ol' Plate of Fried Everything"	August 13, 2024	222	1.89

== Reception ==
=== Ratings ===
==== Season 1 ====
Viewership and ratings per episode of Judge Steve Harvey
No.	Title	Air date	Rating (18–49)	Viewers (millions)	DVR (18–49)	DVR viewers (millions)	Total (18–49)	Total viewers (millions)
1	"Not Mending Fences"	January 4, 2022	0.7	5.16	0.0	0.41	0.8	5.57 (Note: Live+7 ratings were unavailable, so Live+3 ratings have been used instead.)
2	"Stuck on Stupid"	January 11, 2022	0.7	4.46	—N/a	—N/a	—N/a	—N/a
3	"Ok Mr. Hightower!"	January 18, 2022	0.6	4.53	0.1	0.32	0.7	4.85
4	"Problem with Panda"	January 25, 2022	0.5	4.18	0.1	0.37	0.6	4.54
5	"Let's Not Drag Me Into This"	February 1, 2022	0.6	4.00	—N/a	—N/a	—N/a	—N/a
6	"See What Happened Was..."	March 22, 2022	0.5	3.43	0.0	0.32	0.5	3.70
7	"A Sprinkle of Shady"	March 29, 2022	0.4	3.26	0.1	0.34	0.5	3.60
8	"You Cause the Wreck, You Cut The Check"	April 5, 2022	0.5	3.48	0.0	0.30	0.5	3.77
9	"No Pics, No Proof"	April 12, 2022	0.5	3.62	0.0	0.25	0.6	3.87
10	"I've Learned Absolutely Nothing"	April 19, 2022	0.4	3.45	0.0	0.23	0.4	3.67
11	"What The Hell is Going On?"	April 26, 2022	0.4	3.33	0.0	0.26	0.4	3.59
12	"Sister From Another Mister"	April 26, 2022	0.3	2.69	0.1	0.36	0.4	3.05

==== Season 2 ====
Viewership and ratings per episode of Judge Steve Harvey
No.	Title	Air date	Timeslot (ET)	Rating (18–49)	Viewers (millions)
1	"Everybody Plays the Fool"	May 9, 2023	Tuesday 9:00 p.m.	0.3	2.70
2	"Even Though My Aunt Is Dead, I Need My Bread!"	May 16, 2023	Tuesday 9:00 p.m.	0.3	2.52
3	"How Long Have You Been Stupid?"	May 23, 2023	Tuesday 9:00 p.m.	0.3	2.24
4	"Run Me My Coins"	June 14, 2023	Wednesday 8:00 p.m.	0.3	3.16
5	"Stay Lit or Get Gone"	June 21, 2023	Wednesday 8:00 p.m.	0.3	3.05
6	"You Ain't Slicker Than the Slick"	June 28, 2023	Wednesday 8:00 p.m.	0.3	2.89
7	"Did I Black Out?"	July 5, 2023	Wednesday 8:00 p.m.	0.2	2.77
8	"Delayed Don't Mean Denied"	July 26, 2023	Wednesday 8:00 p.m.	0.3	3.01
9	"Don't Drag the Lord in This"	August 2, 2023	Wednesday 8:00 p.m.	0.3	2.93
10	"Sushi in Vegas Is Like the Wing of Atlanta"	August 16, 2023	Wednesday 8:00 p.m.	0.3	3.16
11	"Current Friend Count: Zero"	February 7, 2024	Wednesday 10:00 p.m.	0.2	1.58
12	"You Pay for Them Yams"	February 14, 2024	Wednesday 10:00 p.m.	0.1	1.63
13	"You Don't Want This!"	February 21, 2024	Wednesday 10:00 p.m.	0.1	1.44
14	"Why Are You Always Lying?"	February 28, 2024	Wednesday 10:00 p.m.	0.1	1.55
15	"You Would Make An Excellent Judge"	March 6, 2024	Wednesday 10:00 p.m.	0.2	1.49
16	"Don't Get in Grown Folk Business"	March 13, 2024	Wednesday 10:00 p.m.	0.1	1.35
17	"Mistakes Happen"	July 16, 2024	Tuesday 9:00 p.m.	0.3	2.14
18	"Divine Vine"	July 23, 2024	Tuesday 9:00 p.m.	0.2	1.81
19	"Manipulated and Bamboozled"	July 30, 2024	Tuesday 9:00 p.m.	0.1	1.84
20	"A Whole Other Kind Of Pain and Suffering"	August 6, 2024	Tuesday 9:00 p.m.	0.2	1.92
21	"I'm In An Inter-spacial Relationship"	August 13, 2024	Tuesday 9:00 p.m.	0.2	2.21
22	"A Big Ol' Plate of Fried Everything"	August 13, 2024	Tuesday 9:00 p.m.	0.2	1.89

=== Media reviews and ABC's scrutiny of Harvey's judicial behavior ===
News publication The Decider posted an article arguing that the "ludicrous idea" that Steve Harvey is presiding over small claims court is forgiven once viewing the program and realizing it's less of a court show and more of a comedy. The Decider went on to state that ABC is able to capitalize on the Family Feud host’s penchant for his playfully appalled behavior of speechless stares, incredulous reactions, and exasperated one-liners, a Steve Harvey formula that has led to audience amusement and high ratings in the game show genre and other hosting gigs.

With that frame of mind, it was speculated that the court show has the potential to be "an entertaining diversion, but not one that you’d care to see more than once or twice". The program's cases were characterized as goofy and self-explanatory for someone to resolve. Adding to that point, however, the article stated that the elements of these types of cases play well into what Harvey does best–reading situations and reacting.

The article made a point of praising Harvey for being, thus far, able to ridicule without being disrespectful of his guests, stating, "So far, Harvey has managed to make fun of the cases without belittling the people arguing them. That’s definitely going to be a fine line to toe, but Harvey has been around for a long time and should be able to manage that balance with ease".

However, in an appearance on Jimmy Kimmel Live!, Harvey himself revealed that he was formally chastised by ABC executives for referring to a litigant of the program as "stupid", that the network preferred he'd take a friendlier approach. During the case in question, Harvey proceeded from the bench over to the litigant to have a picture taken together, Harvey citing that he needed a photograph with the stupidest person alive. In sharing the matter with Jimmy Kimmel, Harvey objected to perceived cancel culture and political correctness, stating that celebrities can't get away with saying anything any longer and that it's having a negative impact on comedians.

== See also ==
The court show genre has consisted of other comedies:

- Eye for an Eye
- Gary Busey: Pet Judge
