= Divorce Court =

American court show

- Genre: Nontraditional court show
- Starring: Voltaire Perkins (1957–1962; 1967–1969); William B. Keene (1984–1993); Jim Peck (1984–1989); Martha Smith (1989–1993); Mablean Ephriam (1999–2006); Lynn Toler (2006–2020); Faith Jenkins (2020–2022); Star Jones (2022–present); Joseph J. Catalano Sr (bailiff, 1999–2018); Nick Barrotta (bailiff, 2018–2020); Juan Bustamante (bailiff, 2020–2022); Robert Hernandez (bailiff, 2022–2024); Corey Jovan (bailiff, 2024–present)
- Country of origin: United States
- Original language: English
- No. of seasons: 41
- No. of episodes: 5,767+

Production
- Camera setup: Multi-camera
- Running time: 20–22 minutes
- Production companies: Monet Lane Productions; 20th Television; Lincolnwood Drive; Fox First Run; Georgia Media

Original release
- Network: Syndication
- Release: 1957 – 1962
- Release: 1967 – 1969
- Release: 1984 – 1993
- Release: 1999 – present

Divorce Court is an American court show that revolves around settling the disputes of couples going through divorces. The show has had four separate runs, all in first-run syndication. Since the debut of the original series in 1957, it is one of the longest-running syndicated television programs of all time. Divorce Court also holds the record for the longest-running court show of all time, leading the second-place show The People's Court by two years.

Due to the recasting of the judge role, however, Divorce Court does not boast the longest individual series run or longest arbitrator in the court show genre; those records are held by Judge Judy and The People's Court. The first two runs of Divorce Court, the original version that aired for five seasons from 1957 to 1962 and the first revival that ran for two seasons from 1967 to 1969, featured Voltaire Perkins as the jurist. The second revival ran for nine seasons from 1984 to 1993, with retired Supreme Court of California judge William B. Keene as the presiding jurist.

The current incarnation of Divorce Court premiered on August 30, 1999, and has transitioned between multiple judges: former Los Angeles prosecuting attorney, Mablean Ephriam (1999–2006); former Cleveland Heights municipal court judge, Lynn Toler (2006–2020); former New York City prosecutor, Faith Jenkins (2020–2022); and former New York City prosecutor, district attorney, and former View co-host Star Jones (2022–present).

== Series overview ==
Prior to the premiere of the currently running version, all of the previous incarnations of Divorce Court were presented in the form of reenactments of real-life divorce cases. When the series was revived, it took the form of a reality arbitration based format. The 16th season, which began the show's fourth and present incarnation of the series, debuted in September 1999. By that time, court shows across the board had made a transition to a format involving former judges or attorneys legitimately arbitrating over actual small claims cases, a trend first introduced by The People's Court and heavily popularized by the ratings success of Judge Judy. Following the lead of its counterparts, Divorce Court was reformatted accordingly.

== 1957–1962, 1967–1969 and 1984–1993 incarnations ==
While touted as presenting real cases to television audiences, the stories from earlier versions of Divorce Court were actually dramatized, scripted reenactments of divorce cases presented by actors. Actors portrayed the lawsuit included the plaintiff, who initiated the divorce proceedings; the defendant, who either sought a conflict resolution or sought a divorce decree of his/her own; and a number of witnesses, who testified on behalf of one of the litigants. Meanwhile, student attorneys would argue the cases.

Each episode followed a basic formula, as follows:

- Each attorney giving opening statements.
- The litigants, along with one or two supporting witnesses, giving their side of the story and enduring cross-examination. Frequently, rebuttal witnesses would testify, either to refute or support one of the spouses.
- Closing arguments.
- If children were involved, they would (sometimes, but not always) be interviewed by the judge in his chambers.
- The judge's decision, followed by appropriate reactions by each side.

=== Voltaire Perkins eras (1957–1962, 1967–1969) ===
The first Divorce Court incarnation began airing in 1957 and ran for five seasons until 1962, to be revived in 1967 for an additional two-season run. The first two versions starred actor Voltaire Perkins in the role of the jurist, with Colin Male as the court reporter. In its first year, Divorce Court aired locally in Los Angeles on independent station KTTV as a weekly, live, one-hour program. In 1958, KTTV began recording Divorce Court on Ampex videotape and syndicated the program nationally. Production resumed in the fall of 1967 following a five-year hiatus, this time as a half-hour daily series recorded in color. This second series of Divorce Court ended in 1969, though reruns continued to be offered to some stations throughout the early 1970s.

=== William B. Keene era (1984–1993) ===
A revival began in 1984 and featured retired Supreme Court of California judge William B. Keene as the presiding jurist and former game show host Jim Peck as court reporter (replaced in 1989 by former Scarecrow and Mrs. King star Martha Smith). This edition ran until 1992 for a total of nine seasons, with reruns airing on the USA Network during the early 1990s.

== Current incarnation (1999–present) ==
=== Format ===
The fourth installment and current edition of Divorce Court which premiered in the fall of 1999 has a very different setup from its predecessor editions. Real couples–who had previously filed for divorce–argue their cases before the court, with one case presented in each episode. After both sides present their arguments, the judge rules in favor of one side. The judge's decision includes finding in favor of one of the litigants (or, more often than not, declaring a joint decree) and resolving issues such as alimony and asset division. The judge's decisions are legally binding. As such, the modern version of Divorce Court is essentially a form of binding-arbitration in the manner of many modern day courtroom programs. In some instances, the judge may withhold a decision to give the couple ample time to consider a reconciliation. Occasionally, the show revisits a case from a past episode where time to explore reconciliation was offered in order to determine if the delay either remedied or worsened the marriage. Social media segments involving viewer reactions and polls have also been incorporated this installment of the series.

==== Mablean Ephriam era (1999–2006) ====
When the current version of Divorce Court was resurrected for a 17th season in the fall of 1999, former Los Angeles Prosecuting Attorney Mablean Ephriam was featured as the show's presiding judge. Notable in her judgeship over the series, Ephriam was the show's first African American and first female jurist.

Ephriam presided over this life of Divorce Court for seven years, from the 1999–00 season through the 2005–06 season, her tenure coming to an abrupt and unexpected end over a failure to come to terms in contract negotiations for an eighth season of the current installment. As part of the terms of the contract, Ephriam stated that she was forbidden from changing her hairstyle for the entirety of that following season, that the network reasoned that her hairstyles were too time-consuming for their hair and makeup team. In a press release statement over the matters, Ephriam stated, "When will FOX and the rest of America accept our cultural differences as African Americans and embrace us with all of our different hairstyles, hair textures, hair color."

During her seven-year judgeship over the program, Mablean was known for her quirky voice and expressions, and reactions of amusement, shock and appall over the accounts of outrageous behavior by the litigants.

==== Lynn Toler era (2006–2020) ====
Lynn Toler, a former judge in Cleveland Heights, Ohio (also former judge of previously cancelled series Power of Attorney in the series' last half season) took over the Divorce Court bench for its 24th season (or eighth season of the show's current installment), which premiered September 11, 2006. Toler would eventually become Divorce Court's longest reigning judge—not only over the current edition of the program—but the overall 40-year-old series as a whole, presiding over the broadcast for 14 seasons. In her judgeship over the series, Toler was noted for her strident tone. Toler imparted counsel, words of wisdom, logical reasoning, and an effort to talk sense into the show's litigants and took to humorous scolding of the litigants where necessary.

Toler's final season hosting the program was in the present edition's 21st season, during the 2019–20 television year. It was during that season that Toler took objection to what she described as a hostile, unfriendly atmosphere coming from the network and production. In addition, Toler cited discontentment with an assortment of management decisions brought on her and the program by production. Among those decisions were in the show's set design, the program no longer taking the appearance of an average American courtroom by the show's 21st season and Toler citing physical discomfort in presiding from the judge's bench. In an October 19, 2021, episode of Bailiff Byrd's Bonding with Byrd web series, Toler also explained that producers attempted to move the series into a more farcical, comedic direction following the viral "Rolling Ray" case in November 2019. Toler added that behind-the-scenes altercations between her and Divorce Court producers over production moves were commonplace throughout her final season with the program. For these reasons, Toler left the series at the end of that season (which ended up being shortened due to the COVID-19 pandemic). During the Bonding with Byrd interview, Toler noted that she did not miss the show as she had left it in her final season (taped from Atlanta), but did miss the show that it was previous to her final season (taped from Los Angeles).

==== Faith Jenkins era (2020–2022) ====
For the 2020–21 television year and current edition's 22nd season, former New York City prosecutor and former arbitrator over her own court show for four years, Faith Jenkins appeared as judge over the series, replacing Toler. In November 2020, the series was renewed for two additional seasons, through the 2022–23 season.

==== Star Jones era (2022–present) ====
It was announced on January 10, 2022, that former Brooklyn, New York, Prosecutor and District Attorney Star Jones (best known for her 9-year stint as one of the first co-hosts of ABC's The View) would succeed Jenkins as Divorce Court's next arbitrator in the court show's 40th season September 19, 2022. She began presiding on August 22, 2022. The series will see Jones preside over cases ranging from divorce court proceedings to a whole realm of domestic disputes.

Describing her judicial approach, Jones referred to herself as "Judge Star" and stated while finger snapping, "Honey, Divorce Court is lit this season". Jones has communicated her intentions to bring legitimate solutions and resources to troubled relationships, along with deep empathy as well as her dynamic personality. Bringing an extensive law background to the bench, Jones served for years as a New York prosecutor, and later, as senior assistant district attorney. She has appeared on Today, NBC Nightly News, MSNBC, CNN, Court TV, TruTV, and Inside Edition as a legal correspondent. A previous member of the court show genre, Jones presided over her own courtroom series Jones & Jury. Although the show was canceled after only one season (1994–95), the series made Jones the first Black person to preside over a court show and first female to serve as a television arbitrator, as well as second television arbitrator ever, preceded only by Joseph Wapner.

=== Broadcast production ===
Divorce Court is currently produced by Lincolnwood Drive and distributed by the Fox First Run division of Fox Television Stations, with Sonja Solomun serving as Executive Producer.

The current edition of the series has had four announcers during its run. The first announcer was Jimmy Hodson, who served from the beginning of the current run in 1999 until 2011 when Hodson was replaced by Inger Tutor for one season (2011–2012). Tutor was succeeded by Talon Beeson in 2012, who lasted two seasons (2012–2014). Rolonda Watts (who was formerly with Judge Joe Brown from 2005 until 2013) succeeded Beeson as the show's announcer starting in the 2014–15 season.

The show was previously recorded at Sunset Bronson Studios in Los Angeles. Currently, it is taped in Studio C at the studios of Georgia Public Broadcasting complex in Atlanta in exchange for film industry incentives in Georgia. Recently, they taped at Tyler Perry Studios in Atlanta. Following the completion of the acquisition of 21st Century Fox by Disney in March 2019, distribution of Divorce Court transferred to a new division of Fox Television Stations known as Fox First Run with ad sales handled by CBS Television Distribution.
