= Lifetime Achievement Emmys =

American television awards

The Lifetime Achievement Emmys are a class of Emmy Awards presented in recognition of the significant lifetime achievements of an individual in the American television industry. They are analogous to other awards based on cumulative achievement presented in the United States in the context of numerous career fields.

Winners who have been presented the Lifetime Achievement Emmy in the context of the News and Documentary Emmys, noted for their journalistic efforts, include Larry King, Ted Koppel, Andrea Mitchell, and Barbara Walters.

Notable instances involving the award include when performer Fred Rogers, known for his works on children's programs such as Mister Rogers' Neighborhood, accepted his Lifetime Achievement Award at the 24th Daytime Emmy Awards in 1997, and successfully commanded the audience to give a moment of silence of commemorative thankfulness. Rogers additionally received a standing ovation before his comments, in which he told the crowd "may God be with you".

== History ==
Separate Lifetime Achievement Emmys are presented at the Daytime Emmys, the Sports Emmys (known as the Sports Lifetime Achievement Award), the News and Documentary Emmys, the Children's and Family Emmys and the Primetime Engineering Emmy Awards (known as the Charles F. Jenkins Lifetime Achievement Award), among other Emmy ceremonies. The first Emmy Awards ceremony was held on January 25, 1949, at the Hollywood Athletic Club in Los Angeles, California.

== Details ==
Winners who have been presented the Lifetime Achievement Emmy at the News and Documentary Emmys for their journalistic efforts include Larry King, Ted Koppel, Andrea Mitchell, and Barbara Walters. For his role behind the scenes, media mogul Ted Turner won the award in 2015. "There is no man that has made a bigger or more long-lasting impact on the world of television news than Ted Turner," Bob Mauro, the president of the National Academy of Television Arts and Sciences (NATAS), remarked.

== Notable winners ==
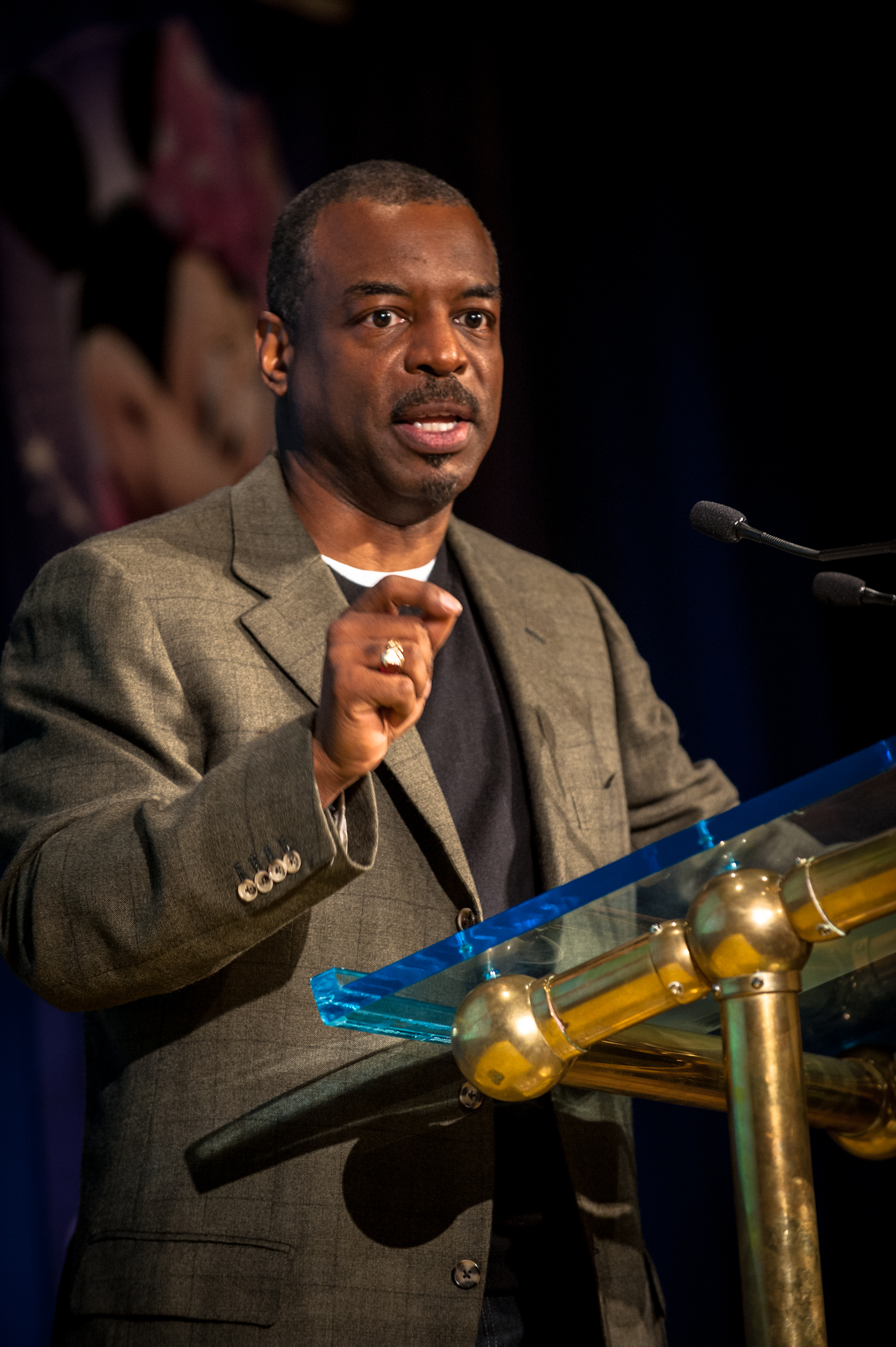
LeVar Burton became the first individual to receive a Lifetime Achievement Award at the Children's and Family Emmy Awards for his decades of work in children's programming in December 2022.

British broadcaster David Frost, who conducted the interviews with Richard Nixon that received dramatization in the 2008 film Frost/Nixon, received a Lifetime Achievement Emmy at the International Emmy Awards in 2009.

Entertainment figures who have received a Lifetime Achievement Emmy at the Daytime Emmys include Judy Sheindlin, the star of Judge Judy, and John Clarke, a film and television actor best known for starring on Days of Our Lives for thirty-seven years.

Receiving the award in 1997, performer Fred Rogers of children's programs such as Mister Rogers' Neighborhood delivered one of the most notable moments in an Emmy acceptance speech during the 24th Daytime Emmy Awards, successfully commanding the audience to give a moment of silence of commemorative thankfulness. Rogers received a standing ovation before his comments, in which he told the crowd "may God be with you".

In 2020, sports reporter Lesley Visser became the first woman to be awarded the Sports Lifetime Achievement Award, for her pioneering work in the generally male-dominated industry of sports television. "To be a pioneer at nearly every juncture... isn't easy despite how Lesley Visser makes it look," Justine Gubar, the Executive Director of the Sports Emmy Awards, publicly remarked, while adding that Visser had become an "unparalleled role model and mentor to countless up-and-coming journalists".

In 2022, actor LeVar Burton became the first person to be honored with a Lifetime Achievement Award for his work on children's television. He was presented with his award at the inaugural Children's and Family Emmy Awards on December 11, 2022. Burton's efforts to promote literacy in the United States has taken over two decades and involved multiple productions such as the television series Reading Rainbow; Burton has not only read books to children but also explained current events to them and otherwise worked to educate them.

== See also ==
- Emmy Awards
- List of lifetime achievement awards
