= Judy Justice =

American reality court show (2021-2026)

- Genre: Arbitration-based reality court show
- Created by: Judy Sheindlin
- Directed by: Randy Douthit
- Starring: Judy Sheindlin (judge); Sarah Rose Levy (legal analyst/law clerk); Whitney Kumar (stenographer/court reporter); Kevin Rasco (bailiff)
- Narrated by: Al Murdoch
- Music by: Mandi Collier
- Country of origin: United States
- Original language: English
- No. of seasons: 4
- No. of episodes: 495

Production
- Executive producers: Randy Douthit; Scott Koondel; Amy Freisleben
- Production locations: Culver Studios, Culver City, California
- Running time: 24 minutes
- Production companies: Sox Entertainment; Amazon MGM Studios

Original release
- Network: Amazon Freevee; Amazon Prime Video
- Release: November 1, 2021 – October 22, 2026

Related
- Judge Judy

Judy Justice is an American arbitration-based reality court show presided over by former Manhattan Family Court judge Judith Sheindlin. Judy Justice is both a spin-off and continuation of the courtroom series Judge Judy (1996–2021). The show features Sheindlin adjudicating real-life small-claims disputes within a simulated courtroom set. Prior to the proceedings, all involved parties sign arbitration contracts agreeing to abide by Sheindlin's ruling.

Judy Justice premiered on November 1, 2021. The show's first four episodes were released on its premiere date, while typically only one new episode is released each weekday.

The series was released on IMDb TV, later rebranded as Amazon Freevee after the first season. It is produced by Amazon MGM Studios, and is the first standard courtroom series to release new episodes exclusively through a streaming service.

Judge Judy reruns vastly outperformed Judy Justice in its first season. Judy Justice received a Daytime Emmy Award for Outstanding Legal/Courtroom Program following its first season.

On September 9, 2026, Sheindlin announced that she would conclude her television career following the October 22, 2026 finale of Judy Justice (4 seasons, 2021–2026), concluding her 30 years in television as a courtroom jurist. As part of the transition, she announced passing the baton on to her son, Adam Levy, who began his new court show Adam's Law on September 14, 2026.

== Cast and crew members ==
=== Host arbitrating judge ===
==== Judy Sheindlin ====
The cast of Judy Justice (clockwise from left): Sarah Rose, Whitney Kumar, Judge Judy Sheindlin, Kevin Rasco

Judy Sheindlin was born on October 21, 1942, in Brooklyn, New York, to German-Jewish parents Murray and Ethel Blum. Sheindlin is a former Manhattan Family Court Prosecutor, Supervising Family Court Judge and Judge Judy television series arbitration star of 25 years. She is the arbitrator and sole creator of Judy Justice.

While long noted for her briskness, Sheindlin was observed to pry deeper into the disputes on Judy Justice. Having the litigants expand on digressive details has led to lengthier cases by comparison to Judge Judy. Also in contrast to Judge Judy, Sheindlin presides over Judy Justice without her trademarked lace collar or traditionally black-colored judicial robe. Rather, she presides in a burgundy colored judicial robe.

During season 1 of Judy Justice, Sheindlin appeared without the artificial clip-on hair bun that she donned in the final few seasons of Judge Judy. She transitioned to sporting an upper-head mini-ponytail from her actual hair. In season 2, Judge Sheindlin has resurrected her hair bun.

=== Supporting cast ===
Sheindlin's supporting cast is made up of three members: a law clerk, a stenographer, and a bailiff. The added positions of a law clerk and stenographer, which is considered a twist for arbitration court shows, seated within the witness stands, were described by show executives as a necessary move to create more life, youth and entertainment at the bench. It has also been described as instrumental in reflecting Sheindlin's pre-celebrity Manhattan family court roots, where there was a law clerk to one side of her and stenographer to the other, likewise seated near the witness stand areas.

- Sarah Rose Levy (Sheindlin's young adult granddaughter, 2022 New York Law School alumna, former Judge Judy and Hot Bench production assistant, former Late Show with Stephen Colbert intern) serves as Judy Justice legal analyst. Rose's responsibility to the program is providing research pertinent to the proceedings to aid Sheindlin in determining her rulings. In addition, Rose contributes a Gen Z input into the court show. With Sheindlin coming from the silent generation in direct contrast with the norms Rose is accustomed to, many episodes capture Sheindlin openly opposing or expressing puzzlement with new and existing trends, values and norms associated with Rose's generation. In response, Rose is seen attempting to rationalize and explain to Sheindlin the zoomer school of thought (i.e., translating on behalf of litigants who are members of Gen Z).

In differentiating Rose from herself, Sheindlin has characterized her as "highly organized." In likening Rose to herself, Sheindlin characterized her as "snarky", "opinionated". The final segment of each case sees an exchange between Rose and Sheindlin in the judge's chambers. In these segments, Rose opines on her grandmother's rulings, typically done in one of the following manners: offering legal input or a perspective that Sheindlin hadn't considered during the proceedings; disagreeing entirely with Sheindlin's handling; or, as is most often the case, agreeing with Sheindlin's rulings and nodding her approval. In 2021, it was suggested by the New York Post that Sheindlin is grooming Rose to fill her shoes and carry on the torch in leading the way in courtroom programming.

- Whitney Kumar (board-certified court reporter in the state of California) serves as Judy Justice stenographer. Outlining her role, Kumar explained that she serves to remind Sheindlin of anything orally communicated throughout the proceedings that ends up in dispute. Scenes often cut to Kumar shown typing transcripts of everything said during the case.
- Kevin Rasco (former Los Angeles probationary officer, entrepreneur, head of behind-the-scenes security at Judge Judy for its final three years) serves as Sheindlin's smiling and chipper bailiff. Rasco explained his courtroom duties as protecting Sheindlin and keeping order in the court.

==== Fill-in supporting cast ====
In season 3, episode 35, the show began using a fill-in cast. The cast members were used on a temporary basis.

- Alexei Mentzer (law student and Judy's step-grandson) served as a temporary law clerk in multiple episodes in season 3. According to his LinkedIn profile, he serves as a judicial intern for the United States District Court for the Eastern District of New York. He is a student at Columbia Law School.
- Cassandra Britt, served as a bailiff for multiple episodes in season 3. She also serves as a bailiff on Tribunal Justice.

=== Backstage crew ===
Sheindlin has spoken highly of the backstage crew that helped her produce and direct the Judge Judy program, sharing that most of them have joined her at Amazon. "That will keep my life on a steady keel," explained Sheindlin. According to Judge Judy team members, the vast majority of behind-the-scenes crew from Judge Judy were said to have rejoined Sheindlin for Judy Justice. Included as part of Sheindlin's backstage crew are former Judge Judy executive producers resuming their same roles in the spin-off:

- Randy Douthit, former Judge Judy executive producer and director (1996–2021), resuming the same role as executive producer and director of Judy Justice.
- Amy Freisleben, former Judge Judy production attorney (1998–2013) and Judge Judy co-executive producer (2013–2021), resuming the same role as co-executive producer of Judy Justice.

== Series presentation and processes ==
=== On-air format ===
In a court programming trend initiated by the Judge Judy program, each Judy Justice episode commences with a cold open trailer of the forthcoming case to be featured in that airing. This is followed by the show's title sequence, presenting the cast. Litigants are then shown making entrances to their respective lecterns, one always assigned to plaintiff and the other to defendant. Bailiff Kevin Rasco swears in the litigants and then instructs the audience to come to order and rise for Sheindlin's entrance. After Sheindlin enters, she herself instructs the audience to be seated. Rasco then provides her with case files and the docket number just before the proceedings begin.

According to executive producers Randy Douthit and Amy Freisleben, most cases on the series focus on a single long case as opposed to the Judge Judy program, which typically featured two shorter cases. Cases were said to be more involved on Judy Justice, entering into disputes further in-depth in contrast to the cursory nature of the Judge Judy series. It was said that this is largely made possible because of the streaming broadcast setup of the program, thus absent the restrictive time constraints that exist in first-run syndication (broadcast method used for the Judge Judy program).

Once the case has completed, two segments follow: The first segment features the parties of the proceedings sharing their feedback to the verdict and matters related to the case, done by breaking the fourth wall. This is followed by another segment involving Sheindlin and her granddaughter, Sarah Rose, the two meeting in Sheindlin's judge's chambers to opine on the preceding case. Rose has described this segment as a tool to add her Gen Z perspective and contemporary insight to the program. Explained Rose, “The term LMAO came up on a case the other day, for example, and [Sheindlin] needed me to interpret.”

=== Monetary award limit ===
In a first for standard court shows, the maximum award limit for Judy Justice is $10,000. Conversely, the maximum award limit for most arbitration-based courtroom programming, including Sheindlin's Judge Judy precursor, has historically been $5,000. While the Judy Justice award limit represents an advancement for the court show genre, the norm for actual small claims court in its authentic form outside of televised entertainment has historically allowed complainants to request anywhere from $5,000 to $10,000, depending on jurisdiction.

=== First-run streaming ===
In March 2020, when Sheindlin initially announced her plans for a new court show, she and her talent agent, Scott Koondel, rejected the option of first-run syndication in favor of first-run streaming. Judy Justice is the first standard arbitration-based reality court show to air first-run episodes through streaming. The nontraditional comedy court miniseries Gary Busey: Pet Judge (which ran for six episodes in 2020) was a streaming broadcast as well. On moving from 25 years in first-run syndication to a streaming service, Sheindlin has stated, "In three to five years all broadcasting will change. Now it's streaming. I'm excited to be in this new venture."

=== Set design ===
Sheindlin has advertised her newer program as more trendy and chic than the precursor, referencing the use of new media, a new robe, and an all new look. Judy Justice showcases a similar but refreshed, upscale, modern version of the courtroom set design from Judge Judy, with a different wood color, marble columns and monitors that are built into the set. Sheindlin presides from a taller, black-colored executive office chair in Judy Justice, discontinuing the burgundy red colored executive office chair used for most of Judge Judy. In a reversal of those colors, Sheindlin now sports a burgundy robe in Judy Justice, discontinuing use of her traditionally black robe from Judge Judy.

While the United States Flag and New York State Flag were behind Sheindlin in Judge Judy, the New York State Flag is replaced in Judy Justice with another. Whereas the audience stands were filled with individual chairs in Judge Judy, furnished benches fill the stands in Judy Justice.

== Broadcast and production details ==
=== Behind-the-scenes operations ===
Judy Justice is notable in that its debut features Sheindlin's return to an in-person/in-studio setup as far as her judicial dispute handling. Resulting from the COVID-19 pandemic, Judge Judy ended its final season with Sheindlin presented virtually, only the litigants and Byrd appearing in studio and absent of an audience. While there exists a studio audience in Judy Justice, it is made up of significantly fewer people, a move that allows the audience members to be vastly separated from one another.

With COVID-19 still in progress during first season production of Judy Justice, the cast and crew were all met with a host of elaborate challenges and barriers during development of each episode. To reduce the chances of potential spread of the virus among cast, crew, litigants, witnesses and audience members, stringent safety measures were enacted: masking, social distancing, regular COVID-19 testing, vaccinations, etc. These procedures added even more time to the already involved hours that go into tapings and studio processes, the extra COVID-19 functions described as putting executive producers, in particular, to the test as far as efficiency.

=== Season one and episode lengths ===
The completed first season of Judy Justice contains 120 episodes. Per her contract, Sheindlin and her Judy Justice crew were commissioned to produce 120 by December 2021, the largest initial order package for a streaming series. Production of the program's first season of 120 episodes was completed in a span of three months, the tapings running from mid-July 2021 to October 2021. As reported by the show's staff, Judy Justice cases span longer and explore more depth and detail than the typical episode of Judge Judy. In part, this is due to less time constraints on streaming platforms in contrast to first-run syndication.

=== Episode release schedule and channel dedication ===
Judy Justice debuted on November 1, 2021, on Amazon-owned IMDb TV with its first four episodes. Typically, Judy Justice only releases one new episode, occasionally two, for each weekday, which is the custom of most courtroom programming. This contrasts with most streaming service programs, which release episodes in large batches at extended hiatus intervals for seasonal binge viewing.

Following December 17, 2021, the program entered into its winter hiatus and returned 5 weeks later, resuming season 1, on January 24, 2022. On January 20, 2022, midway into the court show's 1st season, IMDb TV announced plans to launch a 24/7 streaming channel dedicated to Judy Justice, elevating the show's presence on their platform. On March 8, 2022, IMDb TV renewed Judy Justice for a second season. The first season ended on April 15, 2022.

Season 2 premiered on Amazon Freevee (IMDb TV's updated name) with 4 released episodes on November 7, 2022. Following that, one new episode released for each weekday to December 16. The remainder of season 2 episode then pick up from beginning to mid-2023.

=== Filming locations ===
The court show is filmed in Los Angeles, the same city where Judge Judy was filmed. Specifically, the court show is filmed in Culver City, California, at Culver Studios. The exterior photograph of the courthouse used in the opening credits is the San Diego Central Courthouse at 1100 Union Street.

== Episodes ==
Season	Episodes	Originally released	
Season	Episodes	First released	Last released
1	120	November 1, 2021	April 15, 2022
2	135	November 7, 2022	June 9, 2023
3	120	January 22, 2024	October 24, 2024
4	120	January 19, 2026	October 22, 2026

== Origins and development ==
=== Matters leading to Judy Justice ===
Amid Sheindlin's displeasure with various salary and programming-related judgment calls made by Judge Judy distributor CBS Media Ventures, as well as recurrent legal claims repeatedly filed against her and CBS by talent agency Rebel Entertainment to secure allegedly owed profits for uniting her and CBS, she announced the end of Judge Judy. It was in a March 2, 2020, appearance on The Ellen DeGeneres Show when it was first reported by Sheindlin herself that her long-running, top daytime Nielsen-rated courtroom series would conclude in then following 2020–21 television season (the show's 25th-anniversary season).

The timing of Sheindlin's news took CBS by surprise. At that point, the network had only tentative plans related to the program's series end, with nothing set in stone. Judge Judy program's Bailiff Byrd later reported that he too was unaware of Judge Judy's series end and the development of a spin-off series until Sheindlin's Ellen DeGeneres Show appearance. In revealing the end of her contract with ViacomCBS, Sheindlin shared that the company would subsequently take over syndicated reruns of Judge Judy while she would seek a new broadcast distributor to resume arbitration-based dispute handling for a court show entitled Judy Justice.

=== Establishing a distributor ===
After Scott Koondel, one of three executive producers for Judy Justice, shopped Sheindlin's spin-off series around the media to various streaming distributors for several months, it was first announced on October 29, 2020, that Sheindlin had signed a deal with Amazon Studios to stream Judy Justice. Some early media reports of the Amazon partnership claimed that Judy Justice would be produced in part by Scott Koondel's Sox Entertainment production company, though updated reports have only cited Amazon Studios as producing the series. The information that has remained consistent in both early and later news reports, is that Sheindlin hired Koondel to market her new court show around the entertainment industry. Koondel's efforts resulted in the partnership between Sheindlin and Amazon.

Koondel previously served for 25 years at CBS Television Distribution (the former name of CBS Media Ventures) up until October 2018, exiting from a senior vice president role at the studio. Koondel's departure from CBS was to launch Sox Entertainment in December 2018 in order to package and produce his own entertainment programming.

=== Pre-production arrangements ===
Sheindlin returned to Los Angeles—the same city where Judge Judy was filmed—in mid-July 2021 to begin production on Judy Justice, which was 4 months before the program's debut. Until September 9, 2021, when numerous Judy Justice details were revealed with significant media publicity and numerous press releases, Sheindlin and the program were largely confidential with journalists on what to expect, feeling that revealing too much would spoil the surprises for viewers. Sheindlin shared that contract restrictions prevented her from disclosing details in relation to Judy Justice.

She noted her desires to abandon her trademarked lace collar, and the traditionally black colored judicial robe in favor of another colored robe. On September 9, 2021, Sheindlin revealed her new robe color as burgundy in the first videography from the program, a teaser trailer in which she declared, "Court is back in session."

In discussing her judicial tactics and adjudicating approach prior to the series debut, Sheindlin shared that although set designs, litigants, subjects, graphics and music would all differ from Judge Judy, she herself would remain the same: "It will still have the comfort of truth-finding. I'm still the only judge, but it will be different." Elaborating, Sheindlin stated she would not be "reinventing the wheel. Look, I do what I do. I don't know. Give me a robe and a case, and I'll do my job. So within the confines of me doing what I do, we'll be changing some of the things around me. But I'm not becoming a ballet dancer”. As first reported on September 9, 2021, Judy Justice premiered on November 1, 2021.

== Partnership with Amazon Studios/IMDb TV ==
=== Salary and contracts ===
As part of her contract with Amazon Studios, Sheindlin has complete ownership rights over Judy Justice. It was reported in March 2020 that Sheindlin had committed to at least two seasons of presiding over the program.

In an interview prior to the series debut, Sheindlin alluded to her contractually agreed-on salary rate from Amazon for hosting Judy Justice, stating that she plans on maintaining her reputation as the highest paid celebrity in television. Sheindlin rationalized that due to how public her massive income level was during the run of Judge Judy, salary negotiations with Amazon were therefore effortless. Elaborating on the subject, Sheindlin stated, "The folks at Amazon understood what the parameters were, and there was no issue".

With that said, many media reports have conjectured that Sheindlin has received a significant pay cut from Amazon of $25 million annually for hosting Judy Justice. Conversely, by late into her 15th season of Judge Judy (2012–13), Sheindlin had signed a contract with CBS that advanced her salary from $45 million to $47 million annually, which lasted through to the series end. In 2020, Sheindlin had a net worth of $440 million. By late 2021, Sheindlin's net worth was reported by Forbes to be $460 million.

=== Amazon Studios/IMDb TV's future outlook ===
Amazon Studios ordered a 120 episode first season of Judy Justice by November 2020, a year prior to its debut. Expressing optimism over Judy Justice, Co-Heads of Content and Programming for IMDb TV Lauren Anderson and Ryan Pirozzi were quoted as stating:

Judge Judy Sheindlin is a TV icon and visionary who has entertained millions of fans for decades. As we build the IMDb TV slate of high-quality, ambitious Amazon Studios originals, we are delighted to deliver customers a court program from the legendary Judge Sheindlin who, without a doubt, is the very best in the business.

IMDb TV executives are reportedly aiming to build their to date "little known," free, ad-supported video-on-demand service into “a modern broadcast network” for Amazon. According to the streamer, Sheindlin's spin-off series will play a key role in developing this strategy through attracting her legions of viewers.

== Viewership data ==
=== Early projections of Amazon MGM's Judy Justice vs Paramount's Judge Judy reruns ===
It was reported that Judy Justice will be in direct competition with reruns of its predecessor for highest court viewership ratings. In early September 2021, veteran syndicated television programming analyst Bill Carroll projected stiff competition from syndicated Judge Judy reruns by CBS, such that will presumably leave Judy Justice defeated by its rival. Explaining his rationale, Carroll stated:

Judge Judy viewers have been conditioned through the years to seeing reruns. Some stations would run back-to-back episodes, one new and one rerun. The show's look and format was kept so consistent through the years that to many viewers it is timeless. If you were to say to most viewers that these are not new shows, they would say, ‘Oh, really?’ They're almost certain to surpass Judy Justice in viewership although, to be fair, streaming audiences are smaller than most TV shows.

CBS has additionally reported that the number of stations carrying the reruns are "substantially the same" as when fresh episodes were provided. That being said, it was reported that the value of Judy Justice to IMDb TV will be in driving extensive viewership to the service, where those audiences may be exposed to other programs and offerings. On the subject, Carroll was quoted as remarking, "For [Amazon], it can't be anything but good. For [Sheindlin], it allows her to do what she loves to do."

It was later revealed on October 25, 2021, from Nielsen ratings data sources, that an estimated 7 million viewers were still tuning into syndicated Judge Judy reruns, a decline of only 11% from May 2021 when the court show was airing new episodes. Worthy to note that according to The New York Times, in contrast to traditional syndicated broadcasts, Nielsen ratings are not publicly reported for streaming broadcasts, taking pressure off of streaming entertainers.

Sheindlin and Scott Koondel's decision to air Judy Justice through a streaming service (versus first-run syndication) as well as on IMDb TV in particular (as opposed to the more popular streaming services, such as Netflix, Peacock, Hulu, etc.) has been met with significant negative projections and criticism. One review read, "Streaming represents a test for Sheindlin and for her producers (Randy Douthit and Scott Koondel) to see if she can capture an audience excited to see what they've seen before. . . . And it's familiar enough—with the point that Sheindlin cannot suffer fools having been very amply made at this point—that Judy Justice's existence on streaming comes to feel deeply strange." Another review of the program reads "CBS is aggressively broadcasting a series of reruns (which have traditionally always got high ratings) during the first volley of Judy Justice episodes, in the hope that casual viewers would prefer to watch easily accessible old episodes rather than seek out a new and hellishly obscure [IMDb TV] streaming service."

In October 2021, Judge Sheindlin was questioned on whether she had any concern over Judy Justice failing to succeed due to IMDb TV's obscurity, the speculated loss of much of her older-aged Judge Judy viewers who are thought to be largely oblivious to new media like streaming, as well as the drawing power that the Judge Judy program still holds in broadcast syndicated reruns. Sheindlin described herself as "relatively worry free," adding "I did the math, and I’ve already got enough [money] for 24/7 nursing care until I'm 150." Nonetheless, Sheindlin revealed that she shared with IMDb TV her objections with their then company name and branding, resulting in the company determining that imminent updates would impact the name "IMDb TV," its image and presentation. By April 28, 2022, in accordance with those plans, the streaming service was rebranded and retitled as "Amazon Freevee".

Acknowledging the residual and perhaps insurmountable ratings success of CBS-owned Judge Judy even in reruns in a discussion with The New York Post in October 2021, Sheindlin commented, “Viewers can still catch me at 4 o’clock with my old hair. And the last time I looked, Judge Judy was the number-one program in syndication in daytime television. If we can bring half of that 8 million viewer audience with us [to Judy Justice], that's terrific."

=== Viewership results by season ===
==== Season one ====
Judy Justice came in as the No. 1 original program on IMDb TV for its first season, with more than 25 million streaming hours viewed towards the end of that season. According to the New York Post, the first season generated more than 75 million hours watched between both the US and the UK as a whole. On March 8, 2022, a month prior to its season 1 finale, it was announced that the program had been immediately renewed for season 2, following reports of high viewership.

In an interview response to this news, Sheindlin stated, “I am over the moon and couldn't be happier with the Judy Justice reception in streaming. Amazon has been a terrific partner, and I look forward to our continued collaboration.” Since Nielsen Media Research does not conduct ratings for streaming services (though this will soon be changing at least for Netflix, which will begin using Nielsen in 2023), viewership for Judy Justice season 1 was measured by hours watched and calculated by IMDb TV themselves.

Despite Judy Justice ratings success for its first season, it was revealed in April 2022 that it was vastly outperformed in viewership quantities by Judge Judy reruns, which still dominate daytime television. This finding was mathematically computed from Nielsen ratings' data released for Judge Judy versus IMDb TV's streaming-hours-watched data released for Judy Justice. Comparing the viewership for the two court shows was calculated by an external source and through intricate math formulas due to Nielsen's nonalignment with streaming.

== Reception ==
=== Media reviews ===
Judy Justice has received a mixed reception from media critics for the similarity to its predecessor Judge Judy. Some critics stated that fans of the show's predecessor would appreciate the familiarity, while others criticised it for failing to innovate on the format.

In response to media criticism, Judy Justice executive producers pointed to the updated courtroom set design, advanced maximum award limit, and casting changes.

=== Fan reaction ===
On September 9, 2021, it was announced that Kevin Rasco would serve as Judy Justice bailiff. Fans expressed their displeasure over the absence of Bailiff Byrd, Sheindlin's bailiff in the Manhattan family court system as well as bailiff for Judge Judy.

In a reply over the matters to the press, Sheindlin praised her former bailiff, stating "Byrd is terrific, and we had a great 25-year run. This is a whole new program with a whole new cast and an exciting energy.” Byrd ultimately expressed that he holds no grudges, is grateful to Sheindlin and wished her all the best with Judy Justice.

=== Honors and recognitions ===
Following its first season alone, Judy Justice won the Daytime Emmy Award for Outstanding Legal/Courtroom Program in June 2022. This win makes her the only television arbitrator to earn this award for more than one courtroom program, having won three times for her Judge Judy precursor. The show was nominated for season two, but lost to The People's Court. Judy Justice won for a second time at the 51st Daytime Emmy Awards in June 2024 for its third season.

== Allegations against executive producers ==
Amid the spin-off's debut, Executive Producer Randy Douthit came under fire in November 2021 over years of lawsuits and allegations in relation to creating a toxic workplace backstage of Judge Judy. Sixteen former Judge Judy producers alleged Douthit came to work drunk; engaged in sexual harassment; made inappropriate comments about the appearance of female litigants or disabled litigants; fired staff due to their age; and said he didn't want African-Americans overrepresented on the show.

Among examples, a 2009 lawsuit filed by former Senior Producer Jonathan Sebastien alleged that Douthit announced, "We're not doing any more Black shows. I don't want to hear Black people arguing." In November 2021, six former Judge Judy staffers confirmed Sebastien's account. Douthit denied any wrongdoing and most of the cases were dismissed or settled out of court.

Executive Producer Amy Freisleben has been accused of pitting staffers against one another, frequently threatening people's jobs, drinking on the set, and showing contempt for the show's guests. Sheindlin was criticized over allegedly ignoring misconduct and allowing the producers to work on Judy Justice, causing former staff members to express concern that history will repeat itself.

Sheindlin disputed the allegations, stating:

To author a piece which speculates that I 'was untouchable,' 'don't care how the show gets made,' 'that I don't trust anyone,' 'didn't like cases involving dogs, dog bites or strippers,' 'by and large didn't interact with staffers,' 'wasn't worried about the coronavirus,' is appalling and untrue.
