= Patricia DiMango =

Television Court Judge

Patricia Mafalda DiMango (born May 19, 1953) is a retired American justice of the Supreme Court of Kings County, New York, and television personality.

DiMango starred as one of three judges along with Judge Tanya Acker, Judge Larry Bakman, Judge Michael Corriero, and court room bailiff Sonia Montejano on the panel-based reality court show Hot Bench.

== Education ==
DiMango, a Brooklyn native, earned a Bachelor of Science degree from Brooklyn College at the City University of New York, as well as a Master of Arts degree from Columbia University Teachers College. She received a Juris Doctor degree from the St. John's University School of Law.

== Career ==
DiMango is a former college professor and NYC public school teacher. DiMango was appointed as a Judge of the Criminal Court of the City of New York by Mayor Rudolph Giuliani in 1995. She was appointed Acting Justice of the State Supreme Court, 2nd Judicial District in 1998.

She was elected as a justice of the Supreme Court of Kings County in 2002.

Judge DiMango was one of the three judges on the panel court show Hot Bench, created by Judge Judy Sheindlin, that debuted in September 2014.

DiMango has been involved with numerous other high-profile cases, including murders and other crimes committed against children, and hate crimes.

In March 2013, she first became involved with the case of Kalief Browder, who had spent over three years in Rikers Island awaiting trial. On May 29, 2013, on his 31st court appearance, she ordered his release.

She guest starred as a judge on season 13, episode 1 of Blue Bloods.

She is one of three judges, along with Tanya Acker and Adam Levy, on Amazon Prime Video's series titled Tribunal Justice, which debuted in June 2023 and is also a creation of Judy Sheindlin.
