= Amazon Freevee =

American streaming service by Amazon

- Final logo used from 2022 to 2025
- Former names: IMDb Freedive (2019); IMDb TV (2019–2022)
- Available in: English, German
- Founded: January 11, 2019; 7 years ago
- Dissolved: September 3, 2025; 14 months ago
- Successor: Amazon Prime Video
- Area served: United States; United Kingdom; Germany; Austria
- Parent: Amazon
- Website: www.amazon.com/freevee
- Current status: Offline since September 3, 2025; 1 year ago

Amazon Freevee (Note: Stylized as freevee and fv, also shortened as Freevee, formerly known as IMDb Freedive and IMDb TV, and sometimes spelled FV) was an American ad-supported video-on-demand (VOD) streaming service owned by Amazon, with original and licensed programming.

== History ==
IMDb TV logo

Amazon Freevee was launched as a free, ad-supported video channel by the Amazon-owned online database IMDb in January 2019, under the name IMDb Freedive. It became IMDb TV five months later and it was rebranded to Amazon Freevee on April 28, 2022.

The service was available in the United States, as well as the UK and Germany, through Amazon, IMDb's websites, and all Amazon Fire devices.

On June 17, 2019, IMDb Freedive announced its rebranding to IMDb TV. Signing new deals with Warner Bros. Pictures, Sony Pictures Entertainment and MGM Studios (which parent company Amazon later acquired on March 17, 2022), the streaming service began offering new content. Amazon announced that it would be moving IMDb TV's content team to Amazon Studios on February 20, 2020—with the goal of developing original programming under new IMDb TV co-heads.

On April 13, 2022, it was announced that the service would be rebranded as Amazon Freevee beginning on April 27. It was also announced that it would launch in Germany later that year, and would expand its original programming by 70% in 2022.

On August 3, 2022, Amazon Freevee was launched in Germany.

In February 2024, it was reported that Amazon was planning to shut down Freevee in order to focus on Prime Video. Although Amazon initially denied the plans, the company later announced in November 2024 that it would discontinue Freevee, and merge its content into a free ad-supported section of the Prime Video platform. The Freevee apps were decommissioned on September 3, 2025.

== Content ==
=== Original programming ===
In 2020, a revival of the 2008 crime drama series Leverage was ordered by IMDb TV, making it the first major exclusive series for the streaming service.

On October 3, 2019, IMDb TV announced it licensed the Canadian animated series Corner Gas Animated as a branded original series, joining the live-action comedy franchise Corner Gas and the feature film Corner Gas: The Movie, which were both on the streaming platform.

IMDb TV acquired the rights to Eleventh Hour Films and Sony Pictures Television's young-adult espionage series Alex Rider, premiering a series adaptation on November 13, 2020.

On October 29, 2020, Amazon Studios announced that it would premiere a new court show on IMDb TV starring Judith Sheindlin, serving as a spiritual successor to her syndicated Judge Judy (which was scheduled to conclude in 2021 after 25 seasons, amid disputes between Sheindlin and its distributor CBS Media Ventures). The new series—Judy Justice—would premiere on November 1, 2021, with an initial order of 120 episodes for its first season. In March 2022, Amazon renewed Judy Justice for a second season; the first season had recorded over 25 million hours of viewership, making it IMDb TV's most-watched original series. In 2023, the service premiered a spin-off series executive-produced by Sheindlin, Tribunal Justice.

On February 22, 2021, it was announced that Norman Lear had set up two projects at IMDb TV, half-hour long comedy Clean Slate and hour-long drama Loteria.

On April 13, 2022, it was announced that a spinoff of the Prime Video series Bosch, titled Bosch: Legacy, would premiere on the service on May 6, 2022, and that the coming-of-age series High School, based on the memoir by Tegan and Sara and adapted by Clea DuVall, would premiere in 2022. It was also announced that the service would add original films to its slate, beginning with the romantic comedy Love Accidentally, starring Brenda Song and Aaron O'Connell. In May 2022, Bosch: Legacy and Top Class were both renewed,

In April 2022, Amazon Freevee announced that it had ordered Beyond Black Beauty, the unscripted series America's Test Kitchen: The Next Generation and Play-Doh: Squished, renewals for Bosch: Legacy and Top Class: The Life and Times of the Sierra Canyon Trailblazers, and the music documentary Post Malone: Runaway.

=== Third-party content ===
IMDb TV announced it would begin streaming the NBC drama Chicago Fire on December 6, 2019, making the deal the biggest single licensing pact to date for the streaming service. In addition, IMDb TV announced it would also begin streaming all five seasons of Universal Television's Friday Night Lights starting on December 31, 2019.

In February 2020, IMDb TV acquired the rights to more than twenty scripted TV titles controlled by Walt Disney Direct-to-Consumer & International division and began streaming several Star Trek films in June and July 2020. Starting July 15, 2020, IMDb TV began streaming all 92 episodes of the AMC series Mad Men after completing a licensing deal with Lionsgate.

In January 2021, the service acquired Dean Devlin's former WGN America series Almost Paradise; Amazon Freevee would later order a second season of the series, which premiered on July 21, 2023.

In July 2021, Amazon and Universal Pictures reached a multi-year deal to bring Universal's films to IMDb TV. As part of the deal, titles from Universal's library would become available, making films including The Invisible Man eligible to stream on IMDb TV for free. Most of the studio's titles would be also available ad-free on Prime Video, including future theatrical releases following their first pay window and four months after being released on Peacock.

On November 3, 2021, IMDb TV UK began streaming content from FilmRise, MovieSphere, MagellanTV and SPI's Docustream, along with program-themed channels based on shows Deadly Women, Are We There Yet?, Bridezillas, Unsolved Mysteries, This Old House, MythBusters, and Hell's Kitchen.

In November 2022, Amazon Freevee announced that it had ordered a revival of the long-running Australian soap opera Neighbours, which had originally been cancelled after being dropped by the UK's Channel 5. Freevee would be able to stream new episodes in the United Kingdom and United States, along with archive episodes. Network 10 would remain the first-run broadcaster of the series.

In May 2023, Amazon announced it would make over 100 Amazon Original series and films from Amazon Prime Video available on Freevee. Some shows would also be available in full, while others would only have a selection of episodes.
