= Judy Sheindlin =

American court-show arbitrator (born 1942)

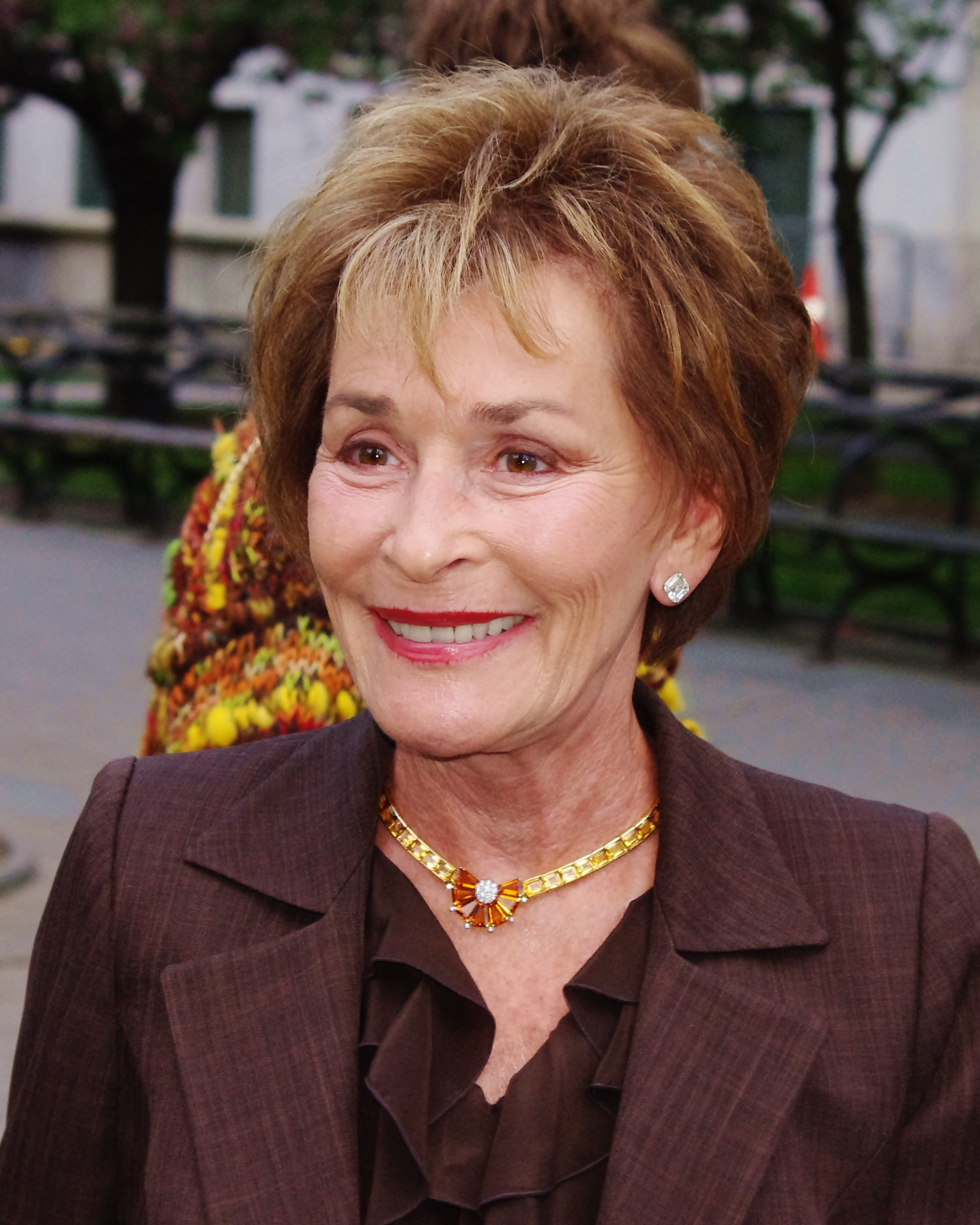
- Sheindlin at the 2012 Tribeca Film Festival
- Born: Judith Susan Blum; October 21, 1942 (age 84); Brooklyn, New York U.S.
- Education: American University (BA); New York Law School (JD)
- Occupations: Judge; court-show arbitrator; television personality
- Years active: 1965–present
- Known for: Judge Judy (1996–2021); Judy Justice (2021–2026)
- Spouses: Ronald Levy (m. 1964; div. 1976); Jerry Sheindlin (m. 1978; div. 1990); (m. 1991)
- Children: 2

Judith Susan Sheindlin (née Blum, born October 21, 1942) is an American attorney, court-show arbitrator and former television personality. She is best known for starring in her eponymous court show Judge Judy for 25 seasons, from 1996 to 2021. Sheindlin became the longest-serving television arbitrator in courtroom-themed programming history, a distinction that earned her a place in the Guinness World Records in 2015, and received a Lifetime Achievement Emmy in 2019 for her work. She has received thirteen Daytime Emmy Award nominations, winning six times.

In November 2021, Sheindlin launched the spinoff streaming series Judy Justice on TV (became Amazon Freevee in 2022 before it was discontinued in 2025, merging with Prime Video), another arbitration-based reality court show in which she handles legal disputes. After winning the Daytime Emmy Award for Outstanding Legal/Courtroom Program in 2022 for the first season of Judy Justice, she became the only television arbitrator to have won the award for more than one court show: three for Judge Judy and one for Judy Justice. On September 9, 2026, Sheindlin announced that she would retire and conclude her on-screen television career with the finale of Judy Justice on October 22.

== Early life and education ==
Judith Susan Blum was born in Brooklyn, New York, on October 21, 1942, to parents of German Jewish and Russian Jewish descent. She describes her dentist father, Murray (1917–1989), as "the greatest thing since sliced bread". Sheindlin describes her mother, Ethel (1921–1980), an office manager, as "a meat and potatoes kind of gal".

Sheindlin graduated from James Madison High School in Brooklyn in 1961 and American University in Washington, D.C., receiving a Bachelor of Arts in government in 1963. She next attended New York Law School, earning a Juris Doctor in 1965.

== Legal career ==
Sheindlin passed the New York state bar examination in 1965 and was hired as a corporate lawyer for a cosmetics firm. Within two years, she became dissatisfied with her job and left to raise her children Jamie and Adam. In 1972, she became a prosecutor in the New York family-court system after hearing about the job from a friend.

In 1982, Sheindlin's attitude inspired New York mayor Ed Koch to appoint her as a criminal-court judge. In 1986, she was promoted to supervising judge in the family court's Manhattan division. She earned a reputation as a tough New York City judge, although she has disagreed with the labels "tough" and "harsh".

== Entertainment career ==
In February 1993, Sheindlin's reputation made her the subject of a Los Angeles Times article written by Josh Getlin, inspired by his wife Heidi, both of whom Sheindlin credits with her rise to fame, that profiled her as a woman determined to make the court system work for the common good. She was then featured in a segment on CBS's 60 Minutes that brought her national recognition. This led to her first book, Don't Pee on My Leg and Tell Me It's Raining, published in 1996. She retired as a family-court judge that same year after having heard more than 20,000 cases.

=== Judge Judy ===
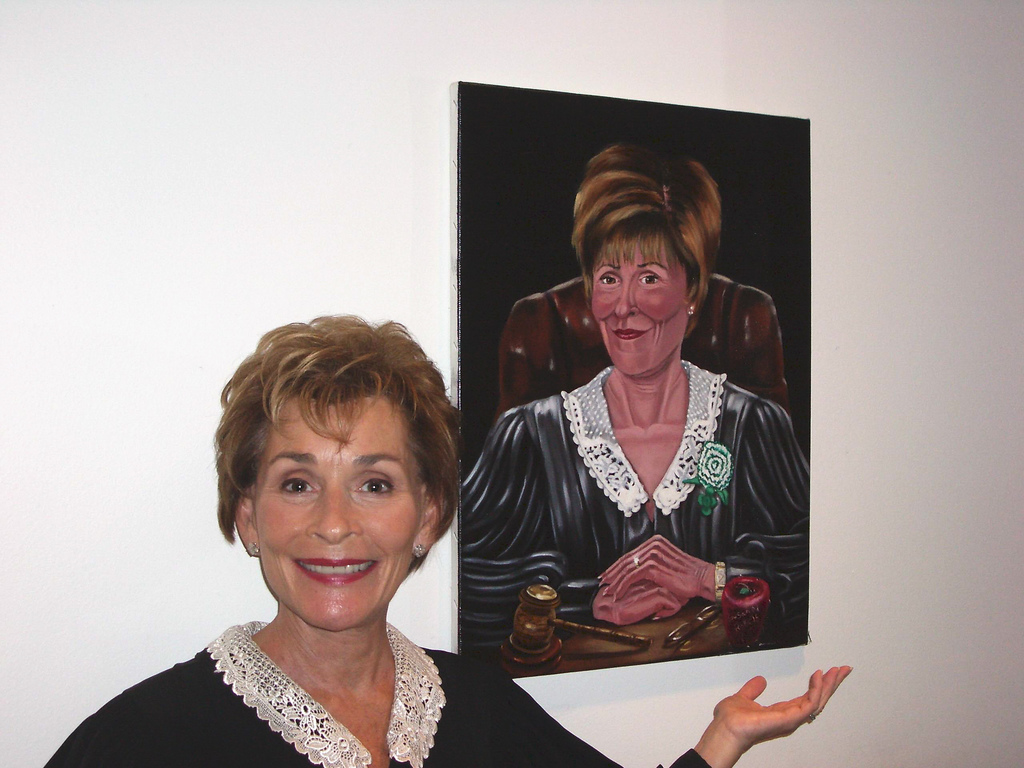
Judge Judy stands next to a portrait of herself in 2005

A little over a year after the 60 Minutes special, Sheindlin accepted an offer in 1995 to preside in a new reality courtroom series, featuring "real cases with real rulings." Her syndicated court show Judge Judy debuted on September 16, 1996, and ran for 25 seasons until July 23, 2021. She was accompanied by her bailiff, Petri Byrd, simply called "Byrd" or "Officer Byrd", who became the longest-serving bailiff in courtroom programming history. Their work relationship predated the program, as Byrd had served as Sheindlin's bailiff in the Manhattan family-court system.

Through its 25-season run, Judge Judy remained the top Nielsen-rated court show and regularly drew nine to ten million viewers daily, occasionally besting the ratings of The Oprah Winfrey Show. From 2009 to its series finale in 2021, Judge Judy was the highest-rated show in all of daytime television programming and first-run syndication. During the show's active run, author Brendan I. Koerner commented on its popularity:

Court-show viewers don't seem to want moral conundrums or technical wrinkles. They love Sheindlin's show because she offers them a fantasy of how they'd like the justice system to operate—swiftly, and without procedural mishaps or uppity lawyers. They get to see wrongdoers publicly humiliated by a strong authority figure. There is no uncertainty after Sheindlin renders her verdict and bounds off the bench, and there certainly are no lengthy appeals.

A 2013 Reader's Digest poll revealed that Americans trusted Judge Judy more than they did all nine justices of the United States Supreme Court.

In 2003, VH1 named Sheindlin in its 200 Greatest Pop Culture Icons list. References to Sheindlin have appeared in many television programs, including Jimmy Kimmel Live!, The Simpsons, Will & Grace, America's Next Top Model, The Weakest Link, The Practice, the Academy Awards telecasts, Betty White's 2nd Annual 90th Birthday, RuPaul's Drag Race, Saturday Night Live and The Amanda Show.

The Judge Judy courtroom series earned Sheindlin numerous awards and honors, including a star on the Hollywood Walk of Fame in February 2006, induction into Broadcasting & Cable's Hall of Fame in October 2012, an award from the vice presidency of the UCD Law Society in April 2013, the Gracie Allen Tribute Award from the Alliance for Women in Media and the Mary Pickford Award from the Hollywood Chamber Community Foundation at the 2014 Heroes of Hollywood.

On June 14, 2013, Judge Judy won its first Daytime Emmy Award after having received its 15th nomination. The program won again in 2016 and 2017. In an interview with Entertainment Tonight (ET) on May 3, 2013, Sheindlin was asked about her failure to win after 14 nominations and said:

I don't know. You know, somehow it would sort of break the spell. The show has been such a tremendous success that I'm almost afraid to think about winning—because so many of those shows that did win are no longer with us. So I say to myself 'you want the Emmy or you want a job? (laughing) Which one do you want?'

On September 14, 2015, Guinness World Records recognized Sheindlin as the longest-serving judge or arbiter in courtroom-themed programming history and as having the longest-running courtroom show.

Sheindlin has drawn considerable attention and made headlines over her substantial salary from the program. In early 2005, Sheindlin's salary was reportedly US$25 million per year. Her net worth at the beginning of 2007 was $95 million, and she ranked No. 13 on the Forbes list of the 20 richest women in entertainment. In January 2008 when Sheindlin's contract was renewed, her salary increased to $45 million per year.

Sheindlin briefly considered retirement in early 2010. Her contract was set to end after the 2013-14 television season. She was quoted at the time as stating, "I think 2013 would be a nice time. It's nice to leave on top. I would consider this a great adventure."

On March 30, 2011, Sheindlin was admitted to the hospital after she fainted on the set of her show while handling a case. She was released the next day, and it was later learned that she had suffered a mini-stroke.

In May 2011, Sheindlin's contract was extended through the 19th season with an annual salary increase by CBS to $47 million. Her annual salary translated into just over $900,000 per workday (she worked 52 days per year taping cases for Judge Judy). According to Forbes, Sheindlin earned $147 million (pretax) in 2017. It was reported by TV Guide Magazine in October 2013 that Sheindlin was the highest-paid TV star. She later stated that her retirement was up to her viewers and said that fans still seemed to be interested. She said, "I'm not tired. I still feel engaged by what I do, and I still have people who like to watch it."

In August 2017, CBS Television Distribution and Sheindlin signed a contract extension through the 2020-21 television season. She later revealed in a March 2020 appearance on The Ellen DeGeneres Show that the series would conclude by its 25th-season anniversary. The final taped case aired on June 8, 2021, and the series finale aired on July 23, 2021. Sheindlin ended the series while discontented with ViacomCBS and facing lawsuits from Rebel Entertainment, also stating that "25 is a good round number" with which to finish.

To honor the 25th and final season of the series, Josh Getlin (writer of the 1993 Los Angeles Times article that brought Sheindlin into the spotlight) wrote another article on Sheindlin. The article was posted on June 8, 2021, (the same day on which the final taped case aired) and explained the background of the 1993 article and Getlin's relationship with Sheindlin.

=== Judy Justice ===
Premiering on November 1, 2021, with production that commenced in July 2021 (shortly after production of Judge Judy ended in April 2021), Sheindlin currently presides over another arbitration-based courtroom series, Judy Justice, a spinoff of Judge Judy. The program is aired through streaming service Amazon Freevee (originally under the name IMDb TV during the show's first season). It is the first standard court show to air first-run episodes exclusively through streaming.

The court show has been characterized as a "hip" rendition of Judge Judy, featuring Gen Z input from Sheindlin's young-adult granddaughter, frequent use of a stenographer to quote testimony to settle discrepancies, Sheindlin's conspicuous robe color, a modernized courtroom set and cases that have been described as more sensational because of fewer time constraints and higher monetary award limits than on Judge Judy.

While Sheindlin has promised to use the same adjudicating techniques that she had employed on Judge Judy, she has lessened her no-nonsense approach, delving deeper into case details, with most episodes focusing on a single long case. Her previous program typically hosted two cases per episode and was known for its aggressive pacing.

After a pre-series debut trailer was released on September 30, 2021, Judy Justice drew early criticism from much of Sheindlin's Judge Judy fanbase over the absence of Bailiff Byrd; Kevin Rasco serves as Sheindlin's Judy Justice bailiff. In October 2021, Byrd stated that he was "confused" and "dismayed" by Sheindlin's lack of communication with him regarding the spinoff. Byrd claimed that Sheindlin omitted him from the series for monetary reasons. In a public statement, Sheindlin praised Byrd as "terrific", but added that the show needed a new and exciting direction. Byrd ultimately expressed that he held no grudges, was grateful to Sheindlin and wished her luck with Judy Justice.

On April 28, 2022, it was announced that Byrd would appear in Tribunal Justice, a courtroom series created and produced by Sheindlin and her production team. Tribunal Justice features former Hot Bench judges Tanya Acker and Patricia DiMango along with Sheindlin's son, former district attorney Adam Levy.

In April 2022, viewership of Judge Judy reruns was found to have vastly outperformed that of Judy Justice's first season. However, the first season of Judy Justice set a record for the number of streaming hours viewed on IMDb TV for its first season, and was thus granted a second season, which premiered on November 7, 2022. Sheindlin won the Daytime Emmy Award for Outstanding Legal/Courtroom Program for the first season of the series, making her the only television arbitrator to have won the award for more than one court show (both Judge Judy and Judy Justice).

=== Retirement ===
On September 9, 2026, Sheindlin announced that she would conclude her on-screen television career with the finale of Judy Justice on October 22. This marked the end of a 30-year career for Sheindlin as a television courtroom personality, spanning both Judge Judy (25 seasons, 1996–2021) and Judy Justice (four seasons, 2021–2026). As part of the commemoration of the conclusion of her 30-year television career, CBS has announced that it would air Judge Judy: Unfiltered, Unforgettable, a 90-minute primetime special celebrating her 30 year career, airing on September 22, 2026.

As part of her on-screen departure, Sheindlin announced the succession that her 58-year-old son, Adam Levy, would succeed her by presiding over his own syndicated court show, Adam's Law, on September 14, 2026. Sheindlin serves as the series’ creator and executive producer. Also as part of the transition, Sheindlin is developing Judyverse, an adult animated series inspired by the viral AI-generated "Baby Judge Judy" video.

== Other media appearances ==
Sheindlin has been interviewed on many talk and news broadcasts over the course of her career, on programs such as Entertainment Tonight, The Ellen DeGeneres Show, The Wendy Williams Show, Katie, Larry King Live, The Roseanne Show, The View, Donny & Marie, The Talk, The Tonight Show, Dateline NBC, 20/20 and Good Morning America. On October 17, 1998, Sheindlin made a surprise guest appearance on Saturday Night Live, comedically interrupting Cheri Oteri's parody of her on Judge Judy. That same year, Sheindlin appeared as herself in a cameo scene from the Judge Judy show in the 1998 American made-for-television crime drama film CHiPs '99. She also served as a judge for the 1999 Miss America pageant.

On February 21, 2000, a 60-minute documentary film about Sheindlin's life and career titled Judge Judy: Sitting in Judgment aired as part of the Biography series. On December 23, 2008, Sheindlin was a guest on Shatner's Raw Nerve. In December 2009, Sheindlin again told her story in a two-hour interview for the Archive of American Television. She launched a short-lived advice-sharing website, whatwouldjudysay.com, in May 2012. In a September 17, 2013 interview with Katie Couric for the 92nd Street Y, Sheindlin elaborated on previously undisclosed facts of her life story and career in the family court.

In 2014, Sheindlin founded her own production company, Queen Bee Productions, which produced the arbitration-based reality courtroom series Hot Bench. Sheindlin had originally desired the title of Hot Bench for her Judge Judy show. Hot Bench, which debuted on September 15, 2014, featured a panel of three judges debating and deciding on courtroom cases. Sheindlin stated, "When my husband Jerry and I were in Ireland recently, we visited the courts and watched a three-judge bench, which I found both fascinating and compelling. I immediately thought what a terrific and unique idea for a television program that brings the court genre to the next level. We have assembled three individuals with extremely varied backgrounds to serve as the judges. They are smart and talented, with terrific instincts and great chemistry, and are sure to create a hot bench." The original panel of judges consisted of New York State Supreme Court judge Patricia DiMango and Los Angeles attorneys Tanya Acker and Larry Bakman, but Bakman was replaced by Michael Corriero. As with Judge Judy, Hot Bench was produced by Randy Douthit and CBS Television Distribution.

On August 31, 2016, it was reported that CBS had planned a scripted, semi-autobiographical drama series based on the life of Sheindlin titled Her Honor. The show was described as following the youngest judge in New York who, while proficient at handling family court cases, has a personal life that needs work. Executive producers of the program were to include Sheindlin, Chernuchin, Arnold Kopelson and Anne Kopelson. Chernuchin was a writer for the legal drama series Law & Order.

In 2017, Sheindlin created a game show titled iWitness that debuted on July 10 and ran for six weeks. The show tested contestants' observational skills, requiring them to view video clips and recall what they have witnessed faster than do their competitors. On September 17, 2017, Sheindlin appeared on the series premiere of Fox News' Objectified, hosted by Harvey Levin. The program's first episode took an inside look at Sheindlin's life.

In September 2017, the National Enquirer issued a formal apology for having published false statements defaming Sheindlin as having cheated on her husband and having suffered from Alzheimer's disease and brain damage. The magazine also apologized to Sheindlin's daughter Nicole for having stated that she had a prison record.

Sheindlin and her program appeared on a November 26, 2017, episode of Curb Your Enthusiasm, presiding over a sketch-comedy court case with Larry David as the plaintiff. The case took the appearance of an actual case from Sheindlin's program, with its courtroom set, voiceover briefs, theme music and audience response.

In 2018, Sheindlin appeared as a guest on Norm Macdonald Has a Show on Netflix.

== Non-media projects and community work ==
Sheindlin, along with her stepdaughter Nicole Sheindlin, is the creator, director and spokeswoman for an alliance designed to empower young women entitled "Her Honor Mentoring".

In September 2017, Sheindlin funded a space for public debate at the University of Southern California. The purpose of the forum was for "free exchange of ideas by well-meaning people."

== Authoring and literature projects ==
- Sheindlin, Judith (1996). Don't Pee on My Leg and Tell Me It's Raining. Harper Collins. ISBN 0-06-092794-1.
- Sheindlin, Judith (1999). Beauty Fades, Dumb Is Forever. Harper Paperbacks. ISBN 0-06-092991-X.
- Sheindlin, Judith (2000). Keep It Simple, Stupid: You're Smarter Than You Look. Cliff Street Books. ISBN 0-06-019546-0.
- Sheindlin, Judith (2000). Win or Lose by How You Choose. Harper Collins. ISBN 0-06-028780-2.
- Sheindlin, Judith (2001). You're Smarter Than You Look: Uncomplicating Relationships in Complicated Times. Harper Paperbacks. ISBN 0-06-095376-4.
- Sheindlin, Judith (2013). What Would Judy Say? A Grown-Up Guide to Living Together with Benefits. CreateSpace Independent Publishing Platform. ISBN 978-1-4839-3167-8.
- Sheindlin, Judith (2014). What Would Judy Say: Be the Hero of Your Own Story.

== Personal life ==
In 1964, Judy Blum married Ronald Levy, who later became a prosecutor in juvenile court. They moved to New York and had two children, Jamie Hartwright and Adam Levy. Her son Adam is a former district attorney for Putnam County, New York, and is now a co-star in Tribunal Justice, and presiding judge in Adam’s Law. They divorced in 1976 after 12 years of marriage.

In 1978, she married Judge Jerry Sheindlin, who later became an arbitrator on The People's Court from 1999 to 2001. In 1980, when Judy was 38, her mother, Ethel, died. They divorced in 1990, partially as a result of the stress and struggles Judy endured after her father's death that same year. They remarried in 1991. She has three stepchildren from her husband's first marriage to Suzanne Rosenthal: Gregory Sheindlin, Jonathan Sheindlin, and Nicole Sheindlin; thirteen grandchildren; and two great-grandchildren. Jonathan is a retinal surgeon, and Greg and Nicole are lawyers. Nicole is the co-creator (along with her stepmother) of the Her Honor Mentoring program.

Sheindlin owns homes in several states, including New York, Florida, California, and Wyoming. She commuted to Los Angeles every other week for two to four days to tape episodes of Judge Judy. In May 2013, she bought a $10.7 million condominium in the Los Angeles suburb of Beverly Hills. In 2018, Sheindlin and her husband announced spending $9 million on the Bird House, a 9,700-square-foot (900 m^{2}) property on 3.67 acres (1.49 ha) in Newport, Rhode Island, once owned by Dorrance Hill Hamilton.

Sheindlin holds honorary Doctors of Law from Elizabethtown College and the University at Albany, SUNY. In 2013, she was made vice-president of the law society at University College Dublin, Ireland, in recognition of her work in family law.

Sheindlin is a supporter of same-sex marriage, and although she has said that she is not a supporter of "big government", she believes that the issue of same-sex marriage should be handled at the federal level rather than on a state-by-state basis. Sheindlin has stated that she is in favor of increasing requirements for gun ownership. She prefers not to be labelled by political terms, and states that she is not registered with any political party. When asked about the 2012 presidential elections, Sheindlin stated that while she voted for President Barack Obama in 2008 (as well as voting for Ronald Reagan and Bill Clinton, respectively in 1980 and 1984, and 1992 and 1996), she did not care for either of the leading candidates in the 2012 United States presidential election. In October 2019, Sheindlin penned an op-ed endorsing Michael Bloomberg for president, despite the fact that he had not announced a campaign. In January 2020, she released an advertisement supporting him. In the 2024 election, she endorsed candidate Nikki Haley for president and joined her at a rally in New Hampshire.

=== Lawsuits ===
In March 2013, a lawsuit was filed against Sheindlin by Patrice Jones, the estranged wife of Randy Douthit (executive producer of Sheindlin's Judge Judy and later Judy Justice court shows). Jones alleged Douthit and Sheindlin had conspired to permit Sheindlin to buy Christofle fine china and Marley cutlery owned by Jones. She said Sheindlin had paid Douthit $50,815 for the items without her knowledge to deprive her of her valuables, and she sought $514,421 from Sheindlin. The suit was settled out of court after Sheindlin returned the tableware to Douthit, and Jones agreed to pay him $12,500 and have the tableware returned to her.

On March 12, 2014, Sheindlin filed a lawsuit against Hartford, Connecticut, personal injury lawyer John Haymond and his law firm. In the lawsuit, Sheindlin accused Haymond and his firm of using her television image without consent in advertisements that falsely suggested she endorsed him and his firm. Sheindlin's producer allegedly told the firm that use of her image is not permitted in March 2013, but ads continued to be produced. The lawsuit filed in federal court sought more than $75,000 in damages. Sheindlin said in her statement that any money she wins through the lawsuit will go toward college scholarships through the Her Honor Mentoring program. Sheindlin further stated, "Mr. Haymond is a lawyer and should know better. The unauthorized use of my name is outrageous and requires legal action." Haymond later filed a countersuit for punitive damages and attorney's fees, alleging defamation of him and his firm by Sheindlin. Haymond insisted that local affiliates asked him to appear in Judge Judy promos to promote Sheindlin for which he obliged. On August 8, 2014, it was reported that the case between Sheindlin and Haymond settled out of court in a resolution that favored Sheindlin. Haymond donated money to Sheindlin's charity, Her Honor Mentoring.
