= Hot Bench =

American panel-based court show

- Genre: Nontraditional arbitration-based reality court show
- Created by: Judge Judith Sheindlin
- Directed by: Karen J. Beck; Randi Clarke Lennon; Robert Vilchez
- Presented by: Sonia Montejano; Gina Findley
- Judges: Tanya Acker; Larry Bakman; Patricia DiMango; Michael Corriero; Rachel Juarez; Yodit Tewolde; Daniel Mentzer
- Narrated by: Rino Romano; Chris Thomas
- Theme music composer: Michael Egizi
- Ending theme: Symphony No. 5, First movement by Ludwig van Beethoven (season 5–present)
- Country of origin: United States
- Original language: English
- No. of seasons: 13
- No. of episodes: 2,000

Production
- Executive producers: Randy Douthit (2014–18); Maureen Fitzpatrick (2014–18); David Theodosopoulus (2018–present)
- Production locations: Stamford Studios; Stamford, Connecticut
- Camera setup: Multi-camera
- Running time: 30 minutes
- Production companies: Big Ticket Television; Queen Bee Productions (2014–18)

Original release
- Network: Syndication
- Release: September 15, 2014 – present

Hot Bench is an American nontraditional panel-based court show that debuted in first-run syndication on September 15, 2014. The series was conceptualized and produced for CBS Media Ventures by Judith Sheindlin of Judge Judy fame, alongside executive producers Randy Douthit, Maureen FitzPatrick, David Theodosopoulos, and co-executive producer James Glover.

For the first two seasons, Hot Bench was presided over by Judge Tanya Acker, Judge Larry Bakman, and former Supreme Court of Brooklyn, New York, Justice Patricia DiMango. Beginning with the third season, Judge Michael Corriero joined, replacing Bakman.

Hot Bench emanates from Stamford Studios in Stamford, Connecticut; production relocated there from Sunset Bronson Studios in Los Angeles after the 2024–2025 season.

== Format ==
The series features a panel of three judges, which acts as an arbitral tribunal, and as with most televised court shows, the cases are a form of binding arbitration in which the litigants forgo their actual lawsuit in favor of appearing on the program.

== Personnel ==
Personnel	Role	Seasons												
Personnel	Role	1	2	3	4	5	6	7	8	9	10	11	12	13
Tanya Acker	Judge, co-host	Main												
Larry Bakman	Judge, co-host	Main												
Patricia DiMango	Judge, co-host	Main												
Michael Corriero	Judge, co-host			Main										
Rachel Juarez	Judge, co-host									Main				
Yodit Tewolde	Judge, co-host									Main				
Daniel Mentzer	Judge, co-host												Main	
Sonia Montejano	Bailiff	Recurring												

== Background and production ==
=== Development ===
The concept was inspired by Sheindlin's vacation to Ireland, a country which occasionally uses panels of three judges to handle one case: "When my husband Jerry and I were in Ireland recently, we visited the courts and watched a three-judge bench, which I found both fascinating and compelling." She added, "I immediately thought what a terrific and unique idea for a television program that brings the court genre to the next level. We have assembled three individuals with extremely varied backgrounds to serve as the judges. They are smart and talented, with terrific instincts and great chemistry, and are sure to create a 'hot bench'." On April 26, 2024, Hot Bench has been renewed for its eleventh and twelfth seasons through 2025–2026 season.

=== Casting ===
The current panel consists of Rachel Juarez, Yodit Tewolde, and Daniel Mentzer who preside over small-claims cases and then argue the merits of the case amongst themselves in the chamber room before rendering a verdict (under the format, only a majority—two of the three-panel members—need to agree on the verdict).

During the first two seasons, the panel consisted of attorneys Tanya Acker and Larry Bakman, along with former Brooklyn, New York Supreme Court judge, Patricia DiMango.

In the beginning of the third season, Bakman announced that he was leaving Hot Bench to focus on his law practice. Michael Corriero was named Bakman's successor. Bakman's final episodes originally aired on October 28, 2016, and Corriero's first episode was scheduled to originally air on November 1, 2016, with series creator Judge Judy Sheindlin and her husband, former The People's Court judge Jerry Sheindlin, serving as guest judges on the Halloween 2016 original broadcasts.

In 2022, DiMango and Acker were replaced on the show by Juarez and Tewolde, while Corriero assumed the chief judge position. In January 2025, Corriero announced he would leave the panel following the conclusion of the series' eleventh season. Two months later, trial attorney Daniel Mentzer was named as Corriero's replacement.

From the show's inception until the end of the 2024–25 season, the bailiff was Sonia Montejano, who had previously served the same role on Judge Joe Brown. When production moved from Los Angeles to Connecticut, she decided not to follow; retired New York City Police Department Chaplains Unit detective Gina Findley was named as her successor.

== Release ==
On December 11, 2014, Hot Bench was renewed for a second season. The show airs in the UK on TruTV, and in Canada on Yes TV and in syndication. The show has produced 1,535 episodes as of September 8, 2022. As of January 27, 2025, same-day airings air on Dabl. The show currently has its own active YouTube and Pluto TV channels like its sister show Judge Judy.

== Accolades ==
Hot Bench has been nominated for three Daytime Emmy Awards.

Association	Year (Note: Indicates the year of ceremony. Each year is linked to the article about the awards held that year, wherever possible.)	Category	Nominee(s) / Work	Result	Ref(s)
Daytime Emmy Awards	2017	Outstanding Legal/Courtroom Program	Randy Douthit, Maureen FitzPatrick, Amy Freisleben, Angela Ford, Jocelyn Jackson, Emily Michele, Arthur Thompkins, Kirk Leins, Christopher Thomas, Tanya Acker, Michael Corriero, Patricia DiMango, and James Glover	Nominated	
Daytime Emmy Awards	2020	Outstanding Legal/Courtroom Program	David Theodosopoulus, Amy Freisleben, Belinda Jackson, James Glover, Debbie Alpert, Sylvia Fierro, Jeffrey Pitts, Arthur Thompkins, Gina Waters, Kirk Leins, Christopher Thomas, Tanya Acker, Michael Corriero, Particia DiMango, and Sonia Montejano	Nominated	
Daytime Emmy Awards	2023	Outstanding Legal/Courtroom Program	David Theodosopoulos, James Glover, Belinda Jackson, Debbie Alpert, Sylvia Fierro, Karen J. Beck, Chris Thomas, Jennifer Chandler, Jeff Pitts, DeLeesa Rouse, Destiny Sirivong, Lois Yaffee, Gina Yates, Tanya Acker, Michael Corriero, Patricia M. Di Mango, Rachel Juarez, Yodit Tewoldeand and Sonia Montejano	Nominated	
