= List of court shows =

This is a list of court shows. Court shows are television programs where court cases are heard and ruled on by a judge or jury. Court shows are particularly popular on daytime syndication.

== A ==
- America's Court with Judge Ross
- Ana Polo Rules

== B ==
- The Blame Game

== C ==
- Caso Cerrado
- Caught in Providence
- Couples Court with The Cutlers
- Court of Current Issues
- Crime & Punishment
- Crown Court
- Curtis Court
- La Corte de Familia
- La Corte del Pueblo

== D ==
- Day Court
- Divorce Court
- Due Process

== F ==
- Family Court with Judge Penny

== G ==
- Gary Busey: Pet Judge
- Guilty or Not Guilty
- Guy Court

== H ==
- Hot Bench

== J ==
- Judge Alex
- Judge's Court
- Judge David Young
- Jury Duty
- Judge Faith
- Judge for Yourself
- Judge Hatchett
- Judge Jeanine Pirro
- Judge Jerry
- Judge Joe Brown
- Judge John Deed
- Judge Judy
- Judge Karen
- Judge Karen's Court
- Judge Mathis
- Judge Maria Lopez
- Judge Mills Lane
- Judge Rinder
- Judge Romesh
- Judge Steve Harvey
- Judge Wapner's Animal Court
- Judy Justice
- Justice for All with Judge Cristina Perez
- Justice with Judge Jeanine
- Justice with Judge Mablean
- The Judge

== K ==
- Kids Court

== L ==
- Last Shot with Judge Gunn
- Lauren Lake's Paternity Court
- The Law Firm

== M ==
- Mathis Court with Judge Mathis
- Ms. Pat Settles It
- Murder, Mystery and My Family
- Murder Trial

== P ==
- Paternity Court
- Perry Mason
- The People's Court
- Power of Attorney
- Protection Court
- Public Atorni: Asunto o Areglo

== S ==
- Sans aucun doute
- Science Court
- Sex Court
- Street Court
- Superior Court (TV series)
- Supreme Justice With Judge Karen
- Swift Justice with Jackie Glass
- Swift Justice with Nancy Grace

== T ==
- Texas Justice
- Trial and Error
- The Trial: A Murder in the Family
- Tribunal Justice
- The Pink Courtroom

== V ==
- The Verdict
- The Verdict Is Yours
- The Verdict with Judge Hatchett

== W ==
- We the People with Gloria Allred/Lauren Lake
