= Judge Karen =

American reality court television series

Logo from 2008 show

Judge Karen is an American arbitration-based reality court show that aired in first-run syndication and ran for one season, during the 2008–09 television period. The series debuted on September 8, 2008, in 48 of the top 50 U.S. markets.

== Format ==
As with other court shows, such as The People's Court and Judge Judy, a former judge presides over small claims court cases as an arbitrator. On this show, the arbitration judge is Karen Mills-Francis, an African-American woman twice elected Miami-Dade County Court judge, who proclaims that "Justice isn't always black and white". A trademark of the series, Mills-Francis did not don the traditional black judicial robe, but rather a burgundy red robe. The introductory sequence displayed her presiding over cases, with the announcer narrating, "She's tough, she's fair, and she cares". The show was produced and distributed by Sony Pictures Television. Chris Gallo was the court show's bailiff during its run. The show was filmed at the Chelsea Studios in New York City.

To distinguish itself from other shows in the then crowded court show field, Mills-Francis permitted litigants to cross-examine witnesses on Judge Karen. Moreover, the series featured a segment at the end of each episode in which Mills-Francis answered videotaped questions from viewers. This segment was entitled "Ask Judge Karen".

It was announced on January 10, 2009, that Judge Karen would not be renewed for a second season. Reruns were subsequently televised on BET and TV One.

=== Influence of Karen's unconventional judge's robe color ===
Judy Sheindlin, of the hit courtroom series Judge Judy, has abandoned the traditionally black judge's robe in favor of a burgundy red colored judicial robe for her spin-off streaming series, Judy Justice. The move roots back to the 2008-2009 television series Judge Karen where Mills-Francis debuted the unconventional burgundy colored judge's robe.

== Spin-offs of Judge Karen ==
=== Judge Karen's Court (2010–11) ===
On November 16, 2009, Litton Entertainment announced that they would be returning Mills-Francis to the air with Judge Karen's Court. Like its predecessor, Mills-Francis returned the unconventionally colored burgundy judge's robe. The show premiered Monday, September 20, 2010, and in many markets took the place of the cancelled Street Court (which Litton had also produced). Despite reports that the show was doing well and had been renewed for a second season in 2011, Judge Karen's Court—like Judge Karen—was axed after one season.

=== Supreme Justice with Judge Karen (2013–present) ===
In November 2012, Entertainment Studios announced that they would be launching their fourth court show, Supreme Justice with Judge Karen, in fall 2013 (currently still in production as of 2024). Notably quitting her use of nontraditionally-colored burgundy judicial robes, Mills-Francis is seen in a traditionally black colored judicial robe in her current series. Entertainment Studios also produces the court shows America's Court with Judge Ross, We the People with Gloria Allred, Justice for All with Judge Cristina Perez and Justice with Judge Mablean, all of which use a nontraditional/dramatized court show format.
