= Cristina Perez (judge) =

American actress, writer, and TV judge (born 1968)

- Born: October 27, 1968 (age 58); New York City, U.S.
- Other name: Cristina Perez Gonzalez
- Occupations: Television personality; television court judge; attorney; writer
- Known for: Justice for All with Judge Cristina Perez, Cristina’s Court and La Corte de Familia
- Spouse: Christopher Gonzalez

Cristina Perez (born October 27, 1968) is an American actress, television personality, writer and TV judge.

== Biography ==
Perez was born in New York City to parents of Colombian descent and raised in California. She received two BAs at UCLA and her JD at Whittier Law School. Perez is best known for presiding over cases in the shows La Corte del Pueblo (1999–2000) and La Corte de Familia (2000–2005) on the Telemundo network.

In September 2006, Perez's book Living by Los Dichos: Advice from a Mother to a Daughter was published by Simon & Schuster.

In March 2010, Perez's second book It's All about the Woman Who Wears It: 10 Laws for Being Smart, Successful and Sexy Too (published by Penguin Books) was released.

She is married to Christopher Gonzalez.

== Television ==
Perez hosted the syndicated American arbitration-based reality court show, Cristina's Court, from 2006 to 2009. It was filmed at KRIV, the Fox owned-and-operated station in Houston. This made Perez one of four Hispanic judges that presided over an English-language American TV judge show, along with Maria Lopez (Judge Maria Lopez), Alex Ferrer (Judge Alex), and Marilyn Milian (The People's Court). The show was executive produced by Peter Brennan (formally of Judge Judy) and directed by Arthur Bergel. Reruns of the show aired on the Nosey streaming service in the 2018–19 season,

Perez is the first Hispanic judge to cross over from Spanish-language to English-language television. Her ancestry is Colombian, rather than Mexican or Cuban, as had been thought by some of her viewers.

Cristina's Court won the Daytime Emmy for Outstanding Legal/Courtroom Program in 2008, 2009, and 2010. The 3 wins was a record until it was tied by Judge Judy in 2017.

Perez participated in a weekly radio segment called "Sex in the News" on the Playboy Radio, which is broadcast on Sirius satellite radio.

According to the Syndicated Network Television Association, Cristina ranked as one of the most trustworthy and influential syndicated hosts on television, ranking second behind Oprah Winfrey among adults 18 to 34 years old.

Perez returned to the court show genre with Justice for All with Judge Cristina Perez which has been airing since 2012. The program is produced by Entertainment Studios which produces two other court shows, America's Court with Judge Ross and We the People with Gloria Allred, all of which have real cases that are re-enacted with actors and scripts. Justice for All airs in both English and Spanish.
