= Court show =

Sub-genre of either legal dramas or reality legal programming

A court show (also known as a judge show, legal/courtroom program, courtroom series, or judicial show) is a broadcast programming genre comprising legal dramas and reality legal programming. Court shows present content mainly in the form of legal hearings between plaintiffs (or claimants in the United Kingdom) and defendants, presided over in one of two formats: scripted/improvised with an actor portraying a judge; or, an arbitration-based reality format with the case handled by an adjudicator who was formerly a judge or attorney.

At present, these shows typically portray small claims court cases, produced in a simulation of a small claims courtroom inside of a television studio. As an exception, from 2020–2021, numerous aspects of this genre were largely forsaken due to COVID-19, such as hearings transpiring from simulated courtroom studio sets. More so than other genres, court shows withstood transformations stemming from the pandemic that were drastic and conspicuous, due to their unorthodox process of interchanging defendants for each individual episode.

Court shows first began in radio broadcasting in the 1930s, starting with The Court of Human Relations, and evolved with the introduction of television in the late 1940s, with programs such as Court of Current Issues, Your Witness, Famous Jury Trials, and more.

== Synopsis ==
The most widely-used techniques in the court show genre are dramatizations, featuring scripted or loosely script-directed hearings, and arbitration-based reality shows. The former remained the technique of choice for roughly six decades. By the late 1990s, however, arbitration-based reality shows became the technique of choice, as they remain today. Dramatizations were either fictional cases - often inspired from factual details in actual cases- or reenactments of actual trials. The role of the judge was often taken by a retired real-life judge, a law school professor or an actor.

Arbitration-based reality shows, on the other hand, typically involve litigants who agree to have their disputes aired on national television and adjudicated by a television show "judge". However, the forum is merely a simulated courtroom constructed within a television studio and not a legitimate court of law. Therefore, said judges are technically arbitrators, and the process depicted is a form of binding arbitration. Most arbitrators presiding in modern court programs have had at least some legal experience, often a conditional requirement to participate in these televised programs.

Court show programs are a staple of daytime television, often airing once or twice every weekday. With minimal production costs (under $200,000 a week, as opposed to entertainment magazines' hefty $1,000,000) and an evergreen, episodic format, court shows are easily and frequently rerun. Like talk shows, the procedure of court shows varies based upon the titular host. In most cases, they are first-run syndication programs. In 2001, the genre began to outperform soap operas in daytime television ratings. While all syndicated shows are steadily losing audiences, court shows have the slowest rate of viewer attrition. Thus, by the late 2000s, the number of court shows in syndication had, for the first time, matched the number of talk shows. As reported in late 2012, court programming is the second highest-rated genre on daytime television. The genre's most formidable competitors in syndication have been the sitcom and game show.

== Court show genre beginnings ==
=== Radio court show era ===
The beginnings of the court show genre are embedded in radio broadcasting, dating back to the mid-1930s. While television has been available since the 1920s, it would not become the main media venue or even popular until the 1950s. The era from the late 1920s to the mid-1950s is commonly called radio's Golden Age. In the mid-1930s, the Hauptmann trial sparked an upsurge of fascination with dramatized court shows wherein trials and hearings were acted out. As radio fans were denied the vicarious thrill of eavesdropping on the actual courtroom trials, many turned to this venue of entertainment. In these programs, testimonies were limited to the most captivating, explosive portions of the original case. Though there was risk of libel and slander suits in producing court case recreations, this threat was commonly sidestepped by taking from trials of the distant past, with the original participants dead. Prior to 1936, there were only 2 major radio court shows: The Court of Human Relations and Goodwill Court.

- The Court of Human Relations (1934–39), also known as True Story Court of Human Relations premiered on January 1, 1934, The Court of Human Relations represents the very first courtroom series. It was a radio series that offered reenactments of genuine courtroom litigation, presided over by actor Percy Hemus as "The Judge". Just before the end of each broadcast, the home audience was "invited" to render the verdict, giving the impression that the show was interactive. This was misleading, however, as listeners had no way of contacting the broadcast. Moreover, since the program was scripted, the verdict was already decided.
- Goodwill Court (1935–36) was the second courtroom series. The broadcast initially aired on New York station WMCA until moving to NBC radio on September 20, 1936. Not a dramatization, the radio broadcast was an early example of reality courtroom shows. The series featured mediator A.L. Alexander hearing the woeful accounts of various real-life defendants (never identified by name and strongly advised not to use bad language). The defendants' cases would be discussed by a panel of real-life judges, offering legal advice. The show was forced off the air by the end of 1936 as the New York County Lawyers' Association had lodged a protest over the dispensation of free counsel over the air. As a result, the New York Supreme Court prohibited actual judges and lawyers from appearing on the program, a ban that would extend to all future legal shows of the era.
- Famous Jury Trials (first appeared on radio, 1936–49; then on television, 1949–52; then in film, 1971) was a long-running American radio broadcast that first started on the Mutual Network in 1936, airing on this station until 1939. After that, the broadcast was moved to ABC/Blue Network from 1940 to 1949. The series would later be transformed into a television program, moving to network TV once the television era took hold. The radio broadcast featured the reenactments of famous court cases throughout history. Listeners were taken into the courtroom where a judge was instructing a jury. Stories were delivered flat without music (atypical of radio shows at the time), giving the testimony added reality and weight.
- Consider Your Verdict (1945–55) A long-running radio broadcast that took the same format of Famous Jury Trials.

== Original TV court show genre (1948–95) ==
=== Early stages of televised court shows ===
As television began to exceed radio's popularity, radio broadcast court programming had waned. By 1948, court programming relocated and appeared on television for the first time, officially birthing the television court show genre. In the genre's first stages, television court shows largely followed the same "dramatized" format as radio court shows, though with the new element of physical and visual entertainment. The vast majority of these court shows were depicted in black-and-white.

=== Dramatized court show ===
Just as some films are based on true stories, some featured cases on courtroom dramas were based on real-life cases. On the other hand, cases could be entirely fictional, though they often drew on details from actual cases. To recreate and conceptualize cases, staff members working for the court shows researched the country's court cases and took ideas from the ones that seemed captivating and fitting for television. Typically, the role of the judge on these programs was played by a law school professor, an actor, or a retired judge. The roles of litigants, bailiffs, court reporters, and announcers were always performed by actors and actresses. While some of these court shows were scripted and required precise memorization, others were outlined and merely required ad-libbing. In outlined cases, actor-litigants and -witnesses were instructed to never get too far off the angle of the case. Under its dramatized format, the early court show genre resembled legal dramas more than the programs that have come to represent the modern judicial genre.

While the introduction of this technique dates back to the late 1940s, the departure of its popular use occurred in the early 1990s. The technique scarcely existed for a great deal of time, that is, up until Allen Media Group, formerly known as Entertainment Studios, reintroduced the methodology in 2010. Initially airing three court shows as of the 2012–2013 television season: America's Court with Judge Ross, We the People With Gloria Allred, and Justice for All with Judge Cristina Perez, these series (each with a standard disclaimer shown at the end of these programs), used a filming style and format more closely resembling arbitration-based court shows than the filmed dramas seen in early television. In the first half of the 2012–13 television season, the aforementioned shows were the lowest rated in the judicial genre. While Allen Media Group has been criticized by some for using this technique, as of the 2024–2025 television season, the company owns nine of the thirteen court shows currently airing, all using the identical format.

=== List of originally traditional court shows ===
The following court shows all follow a basic setup that represents the most widely used technique from the original era of judicial programming. This setup was a mock trial, which saw dramatized court case proceedings being heard and eventually ruled upon by an actor-judge or actors-jury. Roles were made up of plaintiffs, defendants, and judges; and frequently lawyers, juries, and witnesses. Unlike the present-day where the norm is the handling of civil trials, most of the court shows in this era were criminal trials. The main setting was the courtroom; however, performance and drama had been known to leave the courtroom sporadically for short periods so as to add a story-like quality and fill out the plotline. Some of the shows had thematic cases, such as traffic-themed (Traffic Court) and divorce-themed (Divorce Court).

- Your Witness (ABC, 1949–1950) A short-lived court show that involved case reenactments.
- Famous Jury Trials (first appeared on radio, 1936–1949; then on television, DuMont Television Network, 1949–1952; then in film, 1971) A long-running courtroom series that had originally run for 13 years on radio before relocating to television where it would run for an additional four years. In addition to its lives on radio and television, Famous Jury Trials also existed as a movie, produced nearly two decades later in 1971. Overall, the series enjoyed a 17-year run. The televised version featured dramatized cases in a courtroom setting and flashbacks to fill out the stories. It was an anthology series with no regular characters. Since the show was live, the actors playing the litigants had to dash, huffing and puffing, from the courtroom set to the set where the flashback was staged, and then run back to the courtroom set. According to actor Frankie Thomas (also of The Black Robe): "The format established on the radio show created frenzy on TV. The show opened in a courtroom with someone testifying and faded out to a flashback of the events covered in the testimony. But of course the flashback involved the same actor or actress seen in the initial courtroom scene, and the problem was that the different sets were quite far apart in a large studio."
- The Black Robe (NBC, 1949–50) A short-lived court show first known as Police Night Court, the series featured recreated cases from New York City's Night Court. Cases were performed live by actors, taking the parts of defendants, witnesses, and lawyers. The show consisted of a judge (always played by Frankie Thomas Sr.) deciding a verdict. On occasion, actual defendants and witnesses played themselves.
- They Stand Accused (first titled Cross Question and seen locally in Chicago in 1948 and then nationally on CBS in 1949. It was renamed They Stand Accused while running on the DuMont network from 1949 to 1952 and again in 1954) An anthology courtroom series, They Stand Accused reenacted actual trials with juries drawn from the studio audience.
- Divorce Court (syndicated, originally aired from 1957 to 1969; 1986 to 1991; 1999–present) A long-running court show that was inspired by the successes of Perry Mason and Traffic Court. Among the most successful of dramatized court shows was KTTV-Los Angeles' Divorce Court, which ran in prime time and out-performed all other network shows. Likewise, the 1980s era of the show was also immensely popular. The scenes were scripted, and actors took the roles of the lawyers and other characters from real-life cases, but Judge William B. Keene made his own decisions. During the first and second incarnations of the show, actors portrayed the litigants: the plaintiff, who initiated the divorce proceedings, and the defendant, who either sought a reconciliation or sought a divorce decree of their own. In addition, a number of witnesses testified on behalf of the litigants, and student attorneys argued the cases.
- Perry Mason (CBS, 1957–66) A courtroom dramatic series later revived as The New Perry Mason (CBS, 1973–74) and then again, though in the form of a TV movie featuring some of the original cast members in 1985. Other Perry Mason TV movies followed until star Raymond Burr died in 1993. Mason was far more of a traditional, fully scripted dramatic program than just a courtroom program, with location shooting which often provided the background for the subsequent courtroom scenes, and also occasional excursions into Mason's private life. Early episodes were often based on the series of Mason novels authored by Erle Stanley Gardner.
- Traffic Court (first seen locally in Los Angeles in 1957 and then nationally on ABC from 1958 to 1959) A short-lived court show which reenacted traffic cases. (See also the television court series Speeders Fight Back, listed in below section).
- The Court of Last Resort (NBC, 1957–58; ABC, 1959–60) A courtroom program that dramatized the work of criminal law experts who assisted defendants believed to be unjustly convicted.
- The Verdict Is Yours (CBS, 1957–62) A courtroom program with fictional yet unscripted cases. The show used actual attorneys as the show's lawyers and judges. Jurors were drawn from the studio audience.
- Day in Court (ABC, 1958–65) A daytime court show based on actual trials with professional actors portraying the litigants and witnesses. Real attorneys played the role of lawyers. Current and former law professors played the role of the judge.
- Accused (ABC, 1958–59) A nighttime court show spun off from the daytime court show, Day in Court. Accused featured a new story and characters each week, but with a recurring judge (Edgar Allan Jones, a UCLA law professor), a bailiff, a clerk, and a court reporter. Prosecution and defense was played by real lawyers but actors played the role of defendants and witnesses in what were mostly criminal cases. The stories were based on little-known trials researched by staff, lawyers, and law students.
- People's Court of Small Claims (Syndicated, ABC Films, 1958) A short-lived court program presided over by Orrin B. Evans, a professor and later dean of the USC Law Center 1963–68. He presided over three small claims cases per half-hour in his strait-laced and quiet style. The actors were given the framework of a plot which were loosely based on a real case. They would then improvise these plots.
- Night Court U.S.A. (began as local production of L.A. station, KTLA; then went into syndication, 1958) A short-lived court show in which the announcer introduces the show as "real cases and real people," but although these may be real cases, actors are taking on all the roles. The series, thanks in part to lax licensing, remains in occasional reruns to this day.
- Morning Court (ABC, 1960–61) A short-lived spin-off court show of Day in Court, sharing its same concept. The court show stemmed from the success of Day in Court and Accused. The program consisted of a bailiff, court reporter, and alternating judge.
- Courtroom U.S.A. (syndicated, 1960) A short-lived courtroom program that featured recreated, dramatized versions of actual court cases.
- Arrest and Trial (ABC, 1963–64) A short-lived court series which initiated the formula later used on Law & Order.
- Crown Court (Granada TV, 1972–1984) Fictional cases in dramatised trial proceedings deliberated upon and with unscripted verdicts from real members of the public selected from those eligible to serve on juries.
- The Judge (Syndicated, Genesis/Colbert, 1986–92) Originally known as Custody Court, The Judge is a court show that first ran for a dozen years as a local show on WBNS in Columbus, Ohio. After that, it was picked up and syndicated by CBS in 1986. It centered on family court situations and involved children and adolescents in custody, paternity, juvenile delinquency, and adoption hearings. Though based on real-life cases, it was entirely scripted and usually added melodramatic details. Judge Robert Franklin was played by actor Bob Shield.
- Trial by Jury (Syndicated, 1989–90) A short-lived, daily court show that was somewhat based on actual cases. The program was hosted by Raymond Burr, who provided commentary both on the facts and points of law. Joseph Campanella played the role of the prosecuting attorney; Charles Siebert acted as the defense attorney; and Madlyn Rhue was the judge. Rhue's presiding as a female judge was novel, as courtroom programming had been dominated by men playing the part of judge to that point.
- Superior Court (Syndicated, 1986–90) A court show that presented recreations of actual civil and criminal trials from Los Angeles Superior Court. Initially, it starred a former real-life judge (William D. Burns, Jr.) and lawyers, though not the judge and lawyers involved in the original cases. Beginning in 1988, actor Raymond St. Jacques began playing the role of Judge Clayton Thomas. Lawyers, litigants and court watchers were also played by actors.
- Verdict (CBS, 1991) A short-lived court show that used the introduction: "You are about to witness an actual criminal trial. There are no actors, no scripts, no reenactments. Every second is real." However, this introduction was misleading, as the court show was entirely fictitious. As a result of its introduction, it was said that the show misrepresented the profession of lawyers and the legal system as a whole.

=== List of originally nontraditional court shows ===
- On Trial (ABC, 1948–52) A court show featuring public affairs issues brought to public attention in a courtroom format. A real-life judge presided over the arguments of counsel and expert witnesses' testimony on controversial issues. The first episode debated the prohibition of wire-tapping. (Not to be confused with the 1987–88 reality court show of the same name).
- Court of Current Issues (DuMont Television Network, 1948–51) The series was a nontraditional court program of the era in which debates on topical issues were presented.
- Politics on Trial (ABC, 1952) A short-lived court series in which Democrat and Republican parties were presented in a trial format. Prominent members of both political parties presented different issues. This was followed by the other party's "opposing counsel" and defense. A real judge presided. The series was intended to educate the voters in the upcoming presidential election.
- The Court of Human Relations (NBC, 1959) A short-lived court program in which personal advice was given.
- Parole (Syndicated, Telestar, 1959) A short-lived unaffected reality court program. Because the series was a reality show, it was considered nontraditional within its era; however, the program was drastically different from the later reality programs that would become the norm in the present-day courtroom genre. In this court show, cuts from real parole hearings in various prisons were presented in 15- or 30-minute segments. As litigation was not tampered with at all and cameras were simply taken into legitimate courts of law to capture the legal system naturally, the show was arguably more realistic than present-day court shows, which use a binding arbitration format. The series was merely used as a syndication "filler", however.
- The People's Court (Syndicated, Ralph Edwards/Stu Billett Productions, Telepictures Productions, Warner Bros. Television, 1981–93, 1997–2023) After the court show genre went on a lengthy hiatus, it returned with The People's Court. The show is a long-running arbitration-based reality, the very first of this kind. Originally, the show was considered nontraditional, as it was a reality-based member of a genre made up mostly of pretend litigation. Unlike Parole, however, litigation was not captured in its most natural state. Rather, the court show drew on ordinary people who filed grievances in civil court, but opted to have their cases arbitrated by a retired judge in a simulated courtroom. The program's team of researchers canvassed courts across the country in search of the most compelling, unique and thought-provoking cases (though in its 1981–1993 life, the litigants were people who had filed cases solely in Los Angeles County where the show was taped). Cases would run the gamut from disputes between neighbors, family members, and intimates to dissatisfied customers suing businesses. Former Los Angeles County Superior Court Judge Joseph Wapner presided over the series in its first life. Rarely losing his cool, Wapner addressed the litigants with respect and listened patiently as they presented their cases. He was stodgy and known for asking thoughtful questions designed to test the credibility of the testimonies. He retired from the courtroom before his verdicts to review both the facts and the law before rendering a reasoned verdict. This era of the series helmed by Joseph Wapner was cancelled after 12 seasons due to low ratings.
- Guilty or innocent (Syndicated, Genesis/Colbert, 1984) A short-lived court show in which real trials were reenacted in 10 minutes. Contestants could win up to $10,000 if they were able to reach the same verdict as the real jury. "King of Torts" Melvin Belli hosted the trial and John Shearin moderated the 10-minute deliberations.
- On Trial (Syndicated, 1987–88) A short-lived unaffected reality court show, similar in format to Parole. The series featured Raymond Burr. The show sat in on real trials in actual courtrooms that allowed cameras. Clooney added commentary and explained legal terminology to the edited trial segments. He was also joined by an attorney who consulted. (Not to be confused with the 1948–1952 court show of the same name).
- Kids' Court (Nickelodeon, 1988–94) In a case of real audience participation, "legal cases" of interest to kids who must pay for such things as a broken walkman, private phone calls, punishment for bullying, etc., are presented for judgment. The plaintiffs and defendants are picked from the 8- to 13-year-old audience, given about 15 minutes to review the particulars of their character and the facts of their case, and it is left up to them to present the most convincing case. The presiding judge is "the honorable Judge O. Meter", an applause meter in the shape of a wigged jurist. After the jury cheers its approval, whichever side has a better reading on the barometer is the victor.
- Final Appeal: From the Files of Unsolved Mysteries (NBC, 1992) A short-lived spin-off court show of Unsolved Mysteries. Robert Stack hosted the series that, like Court of Last Resort, looked at the cases of convicted felons from both the prosecution and defense sides to determine whether or not the case should be reopened. Viewers decided if the person was entitled to an appeal. The show's slogan was "No system is perfect. Mistakes can happen."
- Jones & Jury (Syndicated, Lighthearted Entertainment, 1994–1995) A short-lived, combination talk/arbitration-based reality court show presided over by former Brooklyn, New York Prosecutor and District Attorney Star Jones. Small claims cases from courts in southern California were tried. Audience participation set this show apart from other programs in the genre. Not only did the judge get to question the litigants, but so did the audience. After Jones dispensed common sense jury instructions, the audience voted on a verdict. In the end, Jones decided who won or lost in what were legally binding decisions. The cases ran from minor to major issues, such as credit card fraud among family members. While only a short stint, the series made Star Jones the first Black person to preside over a court show. Jones & Jury is also the second ever arbitration-based reality court show, only behind The People's Court. On January 10, 2022, it was announced that Jones would return to the court show genre, presiding over longest-running courtroom program Divorce Court beginning with its 40th season in fall 2022.
- Judge for Yourself (Syndicated, Buena Vista, 1994–95) This "court of public opinion" added the presence of celebrities as presiding jurors. It was an hour-long daytime program that selected eight audience members to sit in a jury box and ponder such questions as: "Older Women With Younger Men: Is He too Young for Her?" "Sexless Marriages: Can They Work?" and "Is Lisa too overweight to make it as a singer?" After listening to the witnesses, the "jury" retired to a chamber. There, under the eye of the camera, they deliberated each case. They then returned to the show's host, former Los Angeles lawyer Bill Handel, and delivered their non-binding "verdict". Viewers were also given a 900-telephone number to register their opinions into the program. At times, television personalities took a seat on the jury and led the deliberation process, such as Sally Kirkland, Charlene Tilton, Zsa Zsa Gabor, Mother Love and Jo Marie Payton (Family Matters). (See also the television court series Jury Duty, listed in below section).

== Modern TV court show genre (1996–present) ==
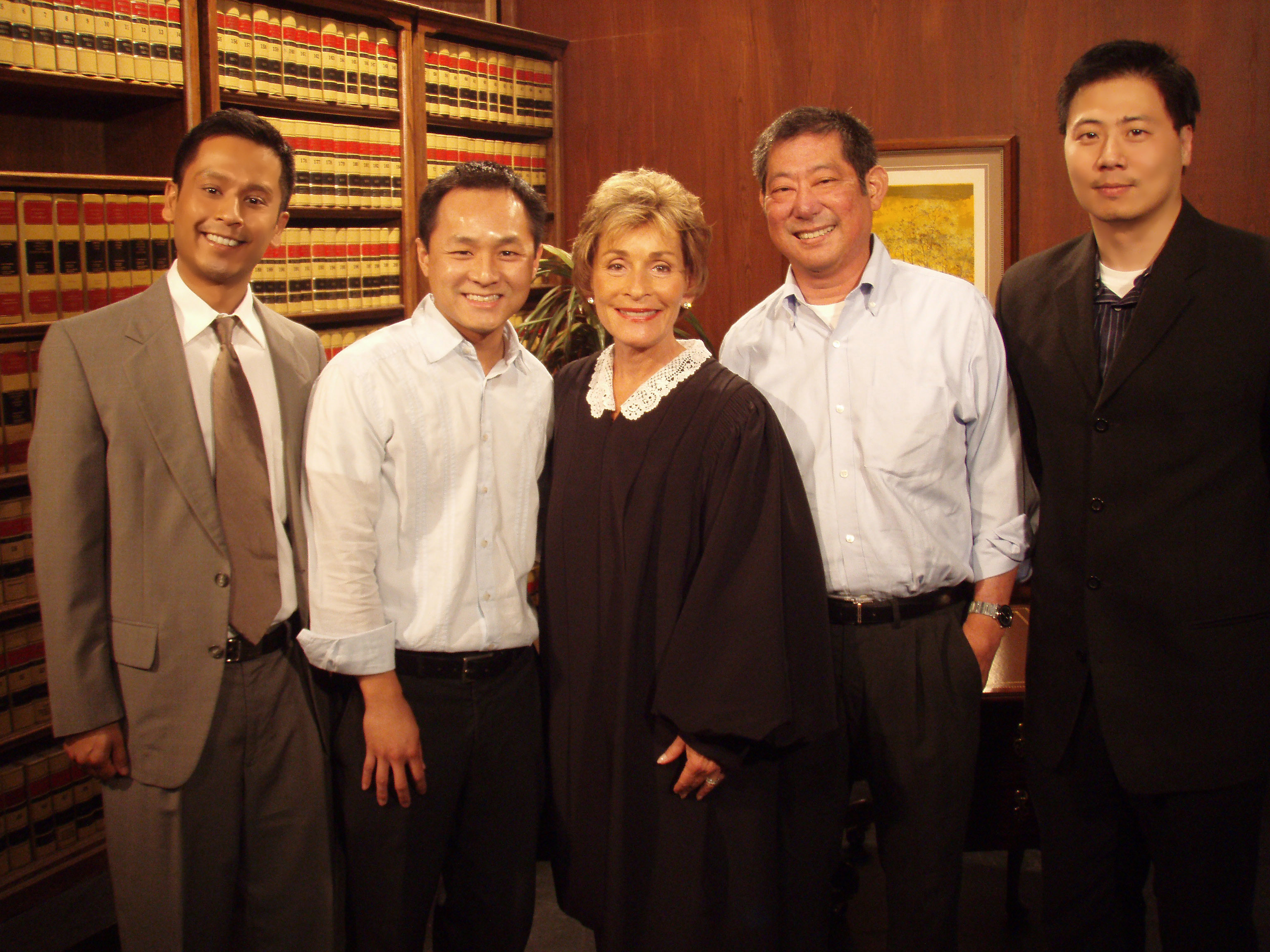
Judy Sheindlin (of highest Nielsen rated courtroom series Judge Judy) with fans

=== Arbitration-based reality court show ===
Far more realistic than their dramatized predecessors, arbitration-based reality versions do not use actors, scripts, improvisation or recreations. Rather, they feature litigants who have legitimately been served and filed lawsuits, presenting their cases to an adjudicator or panel of adjudicators. In exchange for having their case heard on the show, the litigants must agree to dismiss their genuine cases with prejudice. Behavior and commentary from all participants involved is self-directed, as opposed to production script-directed. As such, these types of court shows fall into a subcategory of reality television. It is for these reasons that many of these particular programs make clear claims to authenticity, as text and voiceovers remind viewers that the cases, litigants, and outcomes are "real".

Despite possessing certain real-life elements, however, arbitration-based reality court shows are less credible than "unaffected" reality court programs, which draw on footage from actual courtrooms holding legal proceedings to capture the legal system as naturally as possible (e.g., Parole, On Trial). The "judges" in arbitration-based court programs are not presiding as actual judges, but rather arbitrators or adjudicators. For one to be considered an acting judge, they must be operating within a court and thus bound by the rules and regulations of the legal system. Jerry Springer noted that most attorneys can get the "special certification" required to serve as an arbitrator and host a court show with only a day's training: "if you're a lawyer, it's almost automatic unless you've killed someone." The setting in these types of court shows is not a legitimate court of law, but rather a studio set designed to look like a courtroom. In this respect, arbitrators are not legally restricted to mandatory courtroom/legal policies, procedures, and codes of conduct; rather, they can preside in ways intended for entertainment. Moreover, they have the power to act by their own standards and enforce their own rules and regulations. This power is reinforced through agreements signed by the parties prior to the case proceedings. Once waivers have been signed, arbitrators gain jurisdiction over the legal parties, and thus these litigants are bound by the rules and regulations set by the arbitrator.

One study noted, "In exchange for streamlining the process (and likely sacrificing some legal rights), litigants surrender their fates to the media apparatus and experience a justice system ruled by the conventions of television drama and personality of the presiding television judge."

Arbitration-based reality shows guarantee monetary relief if the judgement is won. The show pays the judgment from a fund reserved for each case, paid for by the show's advertising and syndication revenue; the defendant and plaintiff alike are both compensated with an appearance fee. In actual small claims courts, however, winning the judgement is frequently only the first step as judgments do not ensure the victor the money they are owed. Getting the defendant to pay their judgment can be taxing, and courts typically do not get involved, which means it is left up to the victors to collect.

=== Rise and fall of arbitration-based reality court shows ===
During its first 1981–93 life, The People's Court with Joseph Wapner existed as a nontraditional court show, featuring real-life arbitrations in an era of dramatized court programming. It is the first "arbitration-based reality" court show to air, beginning in 1981. In addition, it is the first popular, long-running "reality" court show. Prior to the arrival of The People's Court, real life elements were next to nonexistent on court shows, with the exception of a few short-lived nontraditional court shows; these precedent reality court shows, however, were only loosely related to judicial proceedings, except for one: Parole (1959), which took footage from real-life courtrooms holding legal proceedings. Since the advent of arbitration-based reality court shows by The People's Court, numerous other duplicate courtroom programs have been produced. Its revolutionizing impact, however, was not immediate. After The People's Court's cancellation in 1993, a second arbitration-based reality court show surfaced the year following, Jones & Jury (1994–95). This was the only arbitration-based reality court show airing during this time and short-lived in its existence. The two other court shows in production during this time were nontraditional programs Kids' Court (1989–94) and Judge for Yourself (1994–95).

The O. J. Simpson murder trial increased public interest in the court system and in video depictions of personal affairs. In 1996, a third arbitration-based reality court show emerged, Judge Judy. Upon debuting, it was described as an "edgier" version of The People's Court, adding attitude to the bench. It was only after the ratings boom of Judge Judy in the late 1990s that a slew of other arbitration-based reality court shows arrived on the scene. In fact, due to the popularity of Judy Sheindlin's show, dramatized court shows became largely a thing of the past. That changed, however, in 2010 when Byron Allen's Entertainment Studios entered the court show field with America's Court with Judge Ross, ultimately delivering eight additional scripted/improvised courtroom programs by 2023. Among the influx of other reality court shows included the resurrections of the previously cancelled and defunct People's Court and Divorce Court (adopting the arbitration-based reality format of its counterparts). Following in the style of Judge Judy, most court shows began using eponymous show titles consisting of the judge's name, and the popularity of impersonal titles dwindled considerably. Judge Judy remained the highest rated court show for its entire 25-season run. It was the highest rated show in all of daytime television programming from 2009 to 2010 television season to its series finale June 2021. Justice David Sills noted in one opinion that "daytime television in the early 21st century has been full of 'judge shows,' where ordinary people bring a dispute for decision before a celebrity jurist."

Divorce Court is the only show in the genre to have utilized both popular formats ("dramatized" and "arbitration reality") during their heyday. Moreover, of all the shows in the modern judicial genre, Divorce Court is the oldest. It has also had the most seasons in the entire genre. The series has had three lives in syndication, from 1957 to 1969 (dramatized); from 1985 to 1992 (dramatized); and currently since 1999 (arbitration-based reality). Altogether, as of the 2021–22 season, the court show has had a grand total of 42 seasons. In second place is The People's Court with 38 seasons and two lives through its 2023 cancellation. With no suspensions in its production history, Judge Judy has had the longest lasting individual life of any reality court show. The program completed its 25th and final season during the 2020–21 television season. Judge Mathis follows with 24 seasons from 1999 to 2023.

As with other daytime television genera, the court show began to see declining clearance in the early 2020s in the face of declining daytime viewership and a weakening market for syndication in general. Major television station ownership groups have opted to expand local newscasts, relying upon the 24 hour news cycle to recycle content from its existing news broadcasts to create less expensive content, thus reducing the available windows for syndicated programs, which in turn draw lower advertising revenues. Warner Bros. cancelled both of its longest-running entries in the genre, The People's Court and Judge Mathis, in response to these changes.

=== List of present-day traditional court shows ===
The following court shows all follow a basic setup that represents the most widely used approach in the present-day judicial genre. Beyond the use of arbitration, other key elements include a simulated courtroom as the main setting in these programs (in some of these court shows, an area just outside the courtroom is regularly used to tape litigant feedback after their case), and one to four hearings typically take up the entirety of the program. The court cases that are captured all operate in the form of small claims court. For example, only small-scale civil matters are heard and ruled on, such as back rent, unpaid personal loans or wages, minor property damage, minor consumer complaints, etc. As another example of the small claims format, relief that is sought is money or recovery of personal property. As another example, litigation is conducted in the form of a bench trial (as opposed to its more common counterpart, the jury trial) as only the court show's arbiter may rule on the dispute. Another example, there are no lawyers present and litigants must defend themselves. An additional example, the maximum award limit is $5,000.

As indicated below, the only traditional court shows still in original episodes from the 1990s or prior are The People's Court (1981) and Judge Mathis (1999), thus making Judge Mathis the longest running court show still in its first run that hasn't had any temporary production halts or recasting of the show's arbitrator.

- Judge Judy (Syndicated, Big Ticket Entertainment, CBS Television Distribution, 1996–2021) A court show presided over by former Manhattan Family Court Judge Judy Sheindlin. Sheindlin pioneered the genre's tough adjudicating approach. Big Ticket marketed the program to potential buyers as one that offered "justice with an attitude" when it entered first-run syndication in September 1996. Her reputation as being tough with a crusty and cheeky nature led to an L.A. Times article in 1993, followed by a 60 Minutes segment, and then her retirement in May 1996 from the bench and the television show in September of that year. Her saucy "on your best day, you're not as smart as I am on my worst day" approach quickly became popular once on television. Sheindlin's court proceedings were very controlled, matter-of-fact, less dramatic and less "Springer-like" than other court shows mainly due to Sheindlin's strict, no-nonsense approach. This could be exampled in Sheindlin's constant coercion of rules, as well as her coercion of the litigants to be concise and relevant. Of all the television judges, she was the only one to never use a gavel though has threatened to use it on a few occasions. Three years into her run, Sheindlin was generating US$75 million in revenue for Big Ticket. Then her ratings doubled. Judge Judy dominated the genre's ratings from its series premiere to its series finale. Moreover, since before The Oprah Winfrey Show left the air, Judge Judy was both the top-rated daytime television program and syndicated program. In the 2011–12 and 2013–14 seasons, as well as the 2014–15 season through its finale season in 2020–21, Judy was the top rated program in all of syndication. It's also worthy to note that the two court shows that outnumber Judge Judy's seasons, Divorce Court and The People's Court, have lasted via multiple reincarnations and shifting arbitrators. Thus, Sheindlin also has a record for being the court show genre's longest serving arbitrator, a distinction that earned her a place in the Guinness World Records in September 2015 during the show's 20th season. She is the first arbitrator or judge to preside over a court show for 20 seasons, and later 25 seasons. Moreover, Judge Judy holds the longest lasting individual life of any courtroom program due to the cancellation(s) of Divorce Court and The People's Court (the only 2 shows in the genre that outnumber Judge Judy's seasons). The courtroom series concluded with the 25th anniversary season during the 2020–21 television season. Sheindlin, however, resumes her legal dispute handling through courtroom spin-off series Judy Justice.
- The People's Court (Syndicated, R.C. Entertainment, RDF Television, Ralph Edwards/Stu Billett Productions, Warner Bros. Television Distribution, 1981–93, 1997–2023) When The People's Court was revived for a 13th season some 4 years after its cancellation, it was brought back without Joseph Wapner. Rather, former lawyer and Mayor of New York Ed Koch was presiding over the program, lasting two seasons (1997–99); this was followed by former New York Supreme Court Justice Jerry Sheindlin, who is the husband of Judge Judy Sheindlin, lasting for one and a half seasons (1999–00, winter 2001). Following Sheindlin, former Florida State Circuit Court Judge Marilyn Milian (2001–2023) took over the bench and ratings on the show finally saw improvement. (Portraits of all the show's previous arbiters as well as Wapner's bailiff, Rusty Burrell, hang in the hallway where litigant interviews are held). By completion of the 2012–13 season, Milian reached 12 1/2 seasons presiding over the series, outlasting Joseph Wapner and officially making her the longest reigning judge of The People's Court. As the show's youngest and first female arbiter, Milian is very animated, at times gesticulating and motioning wildly from the bench. In addition, she often departs from the bench to interact with litigants. Milian also displays a good-natured, lively sass while interacting with the litigants; however, she is mostly noted for her soundness of judgment and levelheadedness. Milian has observed that a majority of her cases are emotionally charged for the litigants, not about the money but the principle. Connecting to its title, The People's Court returns from all of its commercial breaks with a segment in which a crowd of random people, shown outdoors, provide feedback on the ongoing case. Under Milian, the program has become the genre leader in the Daytime Emmy Award-winning arena, winning 5 times by June 2023.
- Judge Joe Brown (Syndicated, Big Ticket Entertainment, CBS Television Distribution, 1998–2013) A court show produced by the same team responsible for Judge Judy and taped directly beside Sheindlin's courtroom set, within the same television studio. Brown's half-hour courtroom series dealt with small claims cases and was the second highest rated court show for its entire 15-year run, behind Judge Judy. Most of the time, the cases revolved around relationships. The series consisted of a court reporter who introduced the program, provided regular updates returning from commercials, and closed out the program. The court show tended to add striking new features for each successive season, such as a season in which a system whereby the judge could poll the audience and receive their input was introduced. Brown is a retired Shelby County State Criminal Court judge. For the most part, Brown had a languid and perfunctory nature about him while hearing cases, particularly while gathering all the facts and hearing the conflicting stories. Occasionally, however, once he suspected a certain party of being guilty, Brown became particularly cantankerous with them shown in his irritated, quarrelsome communication style. Brown also frequently subjected certain litigants to harsh tirades and judgmental commentary, sometimes even while up on his feet, pacing around the bench area. The harshest of his tirades were delivered to males on the series. Brown was criticized for these behaviors as "lacking self-control"; he was quoted as once roaring, "You get the devil out of my courtroom! That's the end of it! Case dismissed."

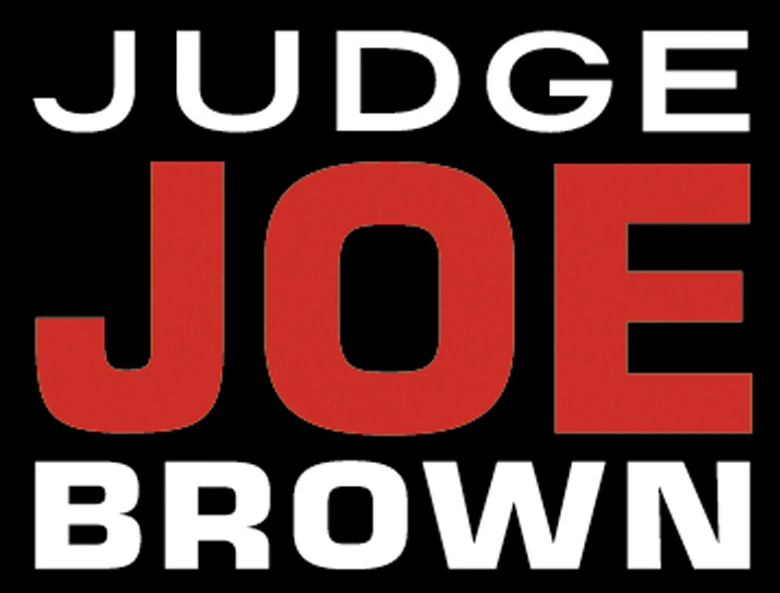

- Judge Mills Lane (Syndicated, Paramount Domestic Television now known as CBS Television Distribution, 1998–2001) A real-life Nevada District Court judge for more than eight years and a professional boxing referee with more than 100 championship fights under his belt, Mills Lane was supremely cut out for his TV role when the series premiered in August 1998. The court show was taped at WPIX-TV and later at CBS Broadcast Center, both in New York City. The court show was in many respects a typical example of its genre, with Lane presiding over small-claims cases for which a $3000 jurisdictional limit had been imposed. What set Judge Mills Lane apart from the rest of the courtroom shows, however, was Mills Lane himself: Although he claimed not be as "strict" as rival TV jurist Judith Sheindlin, he was nonetheless as tough and sassy as they come, sometimes even fierce and frightening presence. This was especially to home viewers, particularly at points when the camera would zoom in on the Maximum Mills mug as Lane chewed out litigants. He started out each case with his famous locution: "Let's get it on." Reportedly, whenever Lane began shaking his gavel at a plaintiff or defendant, you could be sure all "hell" was going to break loose. On more than one occasion, the bailiff would be forced to clear the courtroom in the roughneck manner of a nightclub bouncer. Lane would sometimes let loose with so rapid verbal barrage that no one knew what he was talking about but they knew he was mad. Ratings for Judge Mills Lane were never anything to brag about however. Despite this, the series managed to hang around for three years; reportedly, the only reason it was cancelled was because viewers were "repelled by the new season three theme song".

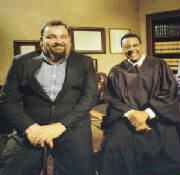

- Judge Mathis (Syndicated, Telepictures Productions, Syndicated Productions, Warner Bros. Television Distribution, 1999–2023) a court show with an uncustomary longevity, running 24 seasons. During its final 2 seasons, it reigned as longest running court show in production that hadn't relied on temporary cancellations-turned-revivals and judge casting changes. The court show is described as bringing a unique perspective with a judge that blended sternness and humor. Judge Mathis is a daily, hour-long, NAACP Image Award winning, Daytime Emmy Award-winning program. The show's star, former Michigan Superior Court and civil rights activist Judge Greg Mathis became the longest reigning African American court show judge by his 16th season during the 2014–15 television year. Moreover, he is the second longest serving arbitrator in the court show genre, just behind Judith Sheindlin. His program also holds a record of having the second longest individual life of any court show and reached 20 seasons in September 2018, a rarity for court programs. Early on in the series, Mathis highlighted his troubled youth turned success story through his theme song as a way of motivating and inspiring his audiences (especially youth audiences) to believe that there is no adversity they cannot pick themselves up from. It is from his background that Mathis derived much of his courtroom formula for this program. Up-close and personal in approach, Judge Mathis prompted litigants to recount their case as far as intimate and emotional details go, before getting into what's directly pertinent to the lawsuit. In this manner, cases on Judge Mathis tended to go deeper and to more revealing places than that of most other court shows. Having a mixture of comedy and sternness about him, Mathis was as fun-filled and humorous as he was lecturing and shaming towards wrong choices and misconduct: when he wasn't expressing his resentment over the litigants' wrongful actions pertaining to the case, his courtroom audience was regularly heard in fits of laughter. Mathis sometimes even bantered directly at audience members. Mathis has also been noted to shift between formal and informal speaking styles during his cases, as examples, having wisecracked, "Y'all out here having catfights, tryin' to become jailbirds," and "Don't nobody know what choo' did. Shoot! Choo' just didn't get caught." It was announced in the latter part of its 24th season that that would be its final season.
- Judge Hatchett (Syndicated, Sony Pictures Television, 2000–08) A court show that delivered a diverse mix of family court, juvenile court and unusual small claims cases. Each case on the show was explored in-depth, which often brought forth hidden, unpredictable angles that cut to the heart of the conflict. What distinguished the series apart from other shows in the genre was its trademark "intervention segments". These were creative sentences handed out by the arbitrator to help litigants understand the implications of their actions and learn how to better handle problems. These reality-check experiences were shot on location around the country from the waters in New York's harbor to the streets of Los Angeles's inner city and offer guidance that can be blunt, confrontational, enriching or motivational. The cornerstone of the series was retired Georgia State Court Chief Judge Glenda Hatchett. Hatchett started out on the program as a gentle and compassionate jurist before later becoming a scurrilous and scalding disciplinarian. Hatchett came up with her innovative sentencing approach during her years as head of one of the country's largest juvenile court systems.
- Curtis Court (Syndicated, King World Productions, 2000–01) A court show presided over by James Curtis. Curtis, a former California prosecutor, ran his TV court with a kinder, gentler hand than those of his competitors. Although a traditional court show, the series stood out for its use of expert witnesses, single-trial episodes, and on-location examinations of evidence. The program was shot in New York and used pending cases from that area. Uniquely, Curtis acknowledged himself as an arbitrator as opposed to a judge. He was known for looking beyond the result to find the source of the problem. After the cancellation of Curtis Court, he became an anchor on Court TV.
- Texas Justice (Syndicated, 20th Television, 2001–05) A court show that dispensed Texas-style justice. Larry Joe Doherty ran the series as arbitrator. Doherty is a senior partner with Houston's Doherty & Wagner and a former Houston attorney. He earned his Juris Doctor from the University of Houston in 1970 and was licensed by the Supreme Court of Texas that same year. "I want to educate the public that there is a way to get your disputes resolved quickly," Doherty said of his courtroom debut. "I'm going to try and dispense broad justice without harshness or hostility." The program focused on a cross-section of relationship and general dispute cases from the Southern and Southwestern regions of the country. Living up to the court show's title, the program's look, music and style evoked a country rural presence and cowboy atmosphere. To boot, Doherty had an innate country drawl and a Walker, Texas Ranger like aura about him. As arbitrator of the series, Doherty was both criticized and praised as being "folksy". He has also been criticized for making "smart aleck wisecracks" on the series. Doherty addressed litigants by their first names and ran a "rowdy" courtroom with audience members hooting, hollering, laughing, sighing, and groaning. In addition, the multitude of camera shots on the program's eye-rolling bailiff, William Bowers, was also criticized.
- Judge Alex (Syndicated, 20th Television, 2005–2014) A court show presided by former police officer, attorney, and Florida Circuit Court Judge Alex E. Ferrer. When Ferrer took the job as television arbitrator, he not only became the second Hispanic arbiter on English-language television (Marilyn Milian of The People's Court, who's also a Cuban American, is the first) but the first and thus far only former police officer to preside over a court show. At 19, Ferrer became Miami-Dade County's youngest police officer when he was hired by the city of Coral Gables. At 24, he graduated from the University of Miami with a law degree and left the police force to practice law. At 34, he was elected judge, making him the youngest circuit court judge in the Eleventh Judicial Circuit Court, where he oversaw family and criminal cases. While Ferrer handled cases that ranged from armed robberies to kidnappings and first-degree murders, his cases on Judge Alex are described as far tamer, entertaining, and by the arbiter himself as oftentimes "bizarre". Every three weeks, he taped 10 cases per day over three days in Houston, where the show was based (once Texas Justice was cancelled, its courtroom set and theme song was used for Judge Alex); Ferrer then flew back to his home in Miami, where he lives with his wife and two children. According to Variety magazine, Judge Alex averaged 3 million viewers per week. Personable and sensible with a sense of humor, Ferrer is less harsh and vocal than some of his judicial counterparts, though he does keep a firm control over his courtroom and does not tolerate misconduct. The arbiter had been characterized as "handsome" and given to telling it like it is. Ferrer's rulings were often prefaced by his explanation of the law at hand to his audience.
- Cristina's Court (Syndicated, 20th Television, 2006–2009) Cristina Pérez had hosted the very popular court show, La Corte de Familia (Family Court), for Telemundo prior to Cristina's Court. The former lawyer was marketed as the first TV judge to ever cross over from the Spanish-language to English-language market. Cristina's Court focused on both small claims cases, conflicts, and legal arguments between families, couples, friends, business partners, and co-workers. Pérez's decisions were injected with her own morals and family values. The series was not only the first in the genre to win a Daytime Emmy Award for Outstanding Legal/Courtroom Program but the only court show to win the prize more than once, winning three consecutive years in a row, one of those years even after the show's cancellation. According to the Syndicated Network Television Association, Perez ranked as the second most trustworthy and influential host in syndication among adults 18–34, ranking just behind Oprah Winfrey.
- Judge Maria Lopez (Syndicated, Sony Pictures Television, 2006–08) Like her contemporary, Judge Alex Ferrer, Maria Lopez is a refugee of Castro's Cuba, arriving in the United States at the age of 8 and learning to speak fluent English within three months. In 1988, Lopez became the first Latina appointed to the Massachusetts bench and two years later, the first person of Latin origin on the state's Supreme Court. Lopez was forced to resign the bench for refusing to apologize for alleged judicial misconduct after convicting a transgender defendant of sexual assault. Her show used the same production staff responsible for the long-running Judge Hatchett. within a month of its debut, Judge Maria Lopez was earning higher ratings than any other new syndicated offering. The series was unable to sustain this early momentum and was cancelled after only two seasons.
- Judge David Young (Syndication, Sony Pictures Television, 2007–09) A court show presided over by retired Miami-Dade County Judge David Young, the first openly gay television "judge". Playing off this fact, much of the arbitrator's behavior was comically camp as he dealt out such warnings as "There's only one queen in this courtroom and that's me," and "You go girl." In fact, the show's tagline was "Justice with a snap" as the judge regularly finger-snapped the litigants upon his making of sassy remarks. Young was criticized for this behavior as perpetuating gay stereotypes. However, he insisted that he was intending to be a role model for LGBT youth. Zany and full of courtroom antics, David Young would randomly break out into show tunes during the hearings and was rarely very serious on the bench. In regards to his courtroom antics, Young described himself as merging his two dream jobs of theater and the law and never being able to get away with the behavior he got away with in his television courtroom in a real-life courtroom. He had a strong and playful chemistry with his bailiff Tawya Young who shared his last name but had no relation to him.
- Judge Jeanine Pirro (CW Network, 2008–09, syndication, 2010–11, Telepictures/Warner Bros.) A court show that was later shortened to Judge Pirro by the 2nd season. The daily, 60-minute series was taped in Chicago and headed by former District Attorney and judge of Westchester County, New York, Jeanine Pirro. Pirro had risen to TV prominence as a legal commentator for the Fox News Channel and was the Republican nominee for New York Attorney General in 2006. Pirro's many years on the bench, specializing in domestic abuse and sex-offense cases, did not seem to prepare her for the shocking revelations made in her television courtroom. In fact, the first episode was a rape case, leaving the judge dumbstruck. Pirro spent much of her time on the show shouting "Let's back up a minute!" as litigants popped out one surprise after another. According to an analysis of court shows, the series came off as contrived and the judge's responses sounded rehearsed. And at times, it appeared as though Pirro's responses had been taped separately, rather than during the actual testimony (the producers however insisted that show was totally unrehearsed).
- Family Court with Judge Penny (Syndicated, Program Partners/Sony Pictures Television, 2008–09) Retired Fulton County, Georgia Judge Penny Brown Reynolds was discovered by TV producers after she was shown on Dr. Phil. Reynolds was one of four daughters raised in hardship and poverty in a tough New Orleans neighborhood by a single mother. She never met her father and grew up watching her mother violently abused by her boyfriends. Reynolds soon became a single mother herself and the patterns in her mother's life began repeating themselves in her own life as well. These circumstances inspired her to enter law where she earned three degrees, all with honors. When Hollywood came a calling, Reynolds was in the middle of her seminary studies where she was earning her Master of Divinity degree. She told TV producers any future show would have to wait until she finished seminary. The cases on the court show involved matters that affected families, from husbands vs. wives to parents suing children. A more sentimental and deeper installment of the court shows, Family Court with Judge Penny was promoted as a show that took the viewer past resolving a lawsuit but to the hearts of the matters, repairing and mending broken families and relationships. Acting as more of a psychologist, Reynolds possessed a soulful, tenderhearted, nurturing, and empowering nature.
- Judge Karen (Syndicated, Sony Pictures Television, 2008–09) Karen Mills-Francis hailed from the same Miami, Florida, jurisdiction as fellow television arbitrator David Young. In fact, it was David Young who recommended Mills-Francis to his court show producer as the next rising judicial star. In 2000, Karen was appointed administrative judge in Miami-Dade County. She is also a foster mother and former public defender of underprivileged adults and minors. Few court shows could lay claim to being as colorful as Judge Karen. As examples, the show intro consisted of Mills-Francis remarking "Justice isn't always black and white"; the arbiter is black with blonde hair; the arbiter wore a burgundy court dress; and the arbiter sat before a light purple backdrop. Moreover, Judge Karen introduced several innovations to the court show genre, such as witnesses being sequestered until summoned (so as to prevent witnesses from simply playing off the testimony of their comrade), litigants cross-examining the witnesses, etc. Several of the cases brought before Mills-Francis allowed her to plead the cause of children's rights. On the program, Mills-Francis was known for her heartfelt caring, as well as her humorous and catchy sass, often delivered in the form of homilies such as "God protects babies and fools—and you're no baby." And whenever a litigant took to behaviors Karen found objectionable, she was quick to deliver saucy scoldings, such as "Stay in your lane! I know how to drive."
- Swift Justice with Jackie Glass (Syndicated, CBS Television Distribution, 2010–12) A court show originally known as Swift Justice with Nancy Grace, it captured HLN host and former Fulton County, Georgia prosecutor Nancy Grace resolving small claims disputes. The show debuted with strong ratings. Unlike other court shows, Grace did not don a court dress and operated without the use of a gavel and bailiff. Moreover, the show had its arbitrator stand behind a glass podium, Grace adding to this by roaming about the studio. Grace was known for her fast rulings without allowing the litigants a word in edgewise, reportedly leading to several lawsuits against the program by its litigants. After the first season, Grace amicably bowed out of the series due to CBS' decision to move production from Atlanta (where Grace lives) to Los Angeles. After this, Jackie Glass (former Nevada Eighth District Court/Clark County judge, who sentenced former NFL star O. J. Simpson for armed robbery and kidnapping in 2008) took over as arbitrator of the series. The court show used technology, polygraph testing, and expert witness to help the arbitrator in settling disputes. The series was not renewed for another season under Glass, cancelled due to low ratings.
- Judge Karen's Court (Syndicated, Litton Entertainment, 2010–2011) In Karen Mills-Francis' return to the judicial genre after the cancellation of her previous courtroom series, she was promoted as not having lost any amount of pizzazz or razzle-dazzle. In fact, upon returning to the genre, she snapped, "Ya'll thought I had left the bench for good. Ha! I was on vacation." Promoted as razor sharp with plenty of style, Karen's compassion and catchy sass from her previous court show were highlighted in promotions for her second courtroom series: "I can run a circle around you faster than you realized I started drawing a circle." In keeping with the arbitrator's trademarked innovativeness, Judge Karen's Court also introduced new elements, such as "You Be The Judge": A segment in which gadgets are used by the courtroom audience to weigh in on who they think should win the case just before Mills-Francis' ruling. In spite of promotions to colorfulness, however, her second series courtroom and overall look was much duller and drearier than her previous courtroom. Mills-Francis' second try was unfortunately unsuccessful, and the series was cancelled after only one season, despite reports of renewal for a second season.
- L'Arbitre (V television network, 2011–present) A French language court show adjudicated by Canadian and former family law lawyer Anne-France Goldwater. Goldwater is renowned for helping legalize same-sex marriage in Canada. Promoted as Quebec's version of Judge Judy, Goldwater is noted for a humorously rough and abrasive manner and rapid wit on the bench. Goldwater is, however, critical of Judge Judy, stating "I love Judy Sheindlin, but I don't like the direct insults to people. My job is not to sit there and be disdainful and say 'You fool. What are you doing here.'" The show features petty small claims disputes, such as couples arguing over who gets the big screen TV and neighbors with broken fence issues. Beyond the entertainment value, Goldwater has stated one of her goals is to show people how to resolve petty issues and squabbles without resorting to overburdening the legal system.
- Judge Rinder (ITV, ITV Studios, 2014–2020) An hour-long British reality court show, it stars the criminal barrister Robert Rinder as the arbitrator. Rinder oversees cases about disputes on a variety of different issues in his small claims courtroom. Issues have involved everything from money and pets to issues involving serious relationship breakdowns and conflicts over wills. By the end of Rinder's first season, Rinder had already earned the title of "Daytime King" for racking up high ratings. Filmed in Manchester, Judge Rinder has been lauded for his entertainment value as well as engaging the British audiences with their own legal system, bringing small court proceedings into popular culture. Explained Rinder, "The show has triggered discussion about the legal issues we can be faced with, across the board. You may have a consumer rights issue – ‘can I take this back? What are my rights against the company?’ Or I lent money to a friend and now I need it back. Or I’ve got a deadbeat ex-husband and how do I get him to pay the child support he owes?’ Then there's personal injury, contracts; just about everything."
- Judge Faith (The Torante Company, Trifecta Entertainment & Media, 2014–2018) A court show that features Faith Jenkins, a former New York City Prosecutor and legal analyst for MSNBC as the judge.
- Judge Romesh (Dave (TV Channel), Hungry Bear Media, 2018–2019) is a comedy court show hosted by Romesh Ranganathan.
- Judge Jerry (NBCUniversal Television Distribution, 2019–2022) NBCUniveral, which has historically syndicated tabloid talk shows but had never distributed an arbitration court show, entered the genre with Judge Jerry. It replaced the long-running tabloid talk show Jerry Springer and shared its host, former Mayor of Cincinnati and media personality Jerry Springer.
- Chrissy's Court (Quibi, 2020; Roku Channel, 2021–2022) Model Chrissy Teigen oversaw this arbitration court show originally produced exclusively for mobile device audiences. Teigen's mother, known as "Pepper Thai," served as bailiff. The show was billed as a comedy but operated within the same format as non-comedic arbitration court shows.
- Relative Justice (Syndicated, Wrigley Media Group, Bloom 'N Apple Entertainment, 2021–2023) A court show presided over by Texas, California, and New York State Licensed Attorney Judge Rhonda Wills.
- Judy Justice (Streamed, IMDb TV which was retitled Amazon Freevee, Amazon Studios, Sox Entertainment, 2021–2026) A spin-off of the successful, top Nielsen-rated courtroom series Judge Judy, this courtroom strip ran for seasons and brought back famed television jurist Judith Sheindlin as she presided over arbitration-based legal proceedings. During its pre-production stages, Sheindlin promised not to change up her trademarked crusty demeanor and tough style, bringing the same judicial approach that made Judge Judy a success. Sheindlin was identified in the media as toning down her no-nonsense instruction for briskness, concision and relevancy, instead prying and inquiring for litigants to expand into decorative detail. The spin-off was advertised as a "more hip" rendition of Judge Judy and presents from a courtroom set similar to the former, but notably more modern and upscale. In a move unprecedented for the standard court show, the series is the first to air new episodes from a streaming service. In a move pioneered by the albeit short-lived series Judge Karen, Sheindlin is also absent of the traditionally black judicial robe that she presided in on Judge Judy, replacing this with a burgundy colored robe. Leading into the series premiere, Judy Justice was met with heavily publicized and widespread criticism centrally over the absence of Judge Judy program Bailiff Byrd, and shortly thereafter, a lack of differentiation from Judge Judy. The media slammed the program as not having its own identity, rather existing as a pale imitation of Sheindlin's Judge Judy. The series was also heavily critiqued for the move to air through a streaming service–and what was slammed as an unpopular streaming service (IMDb TV) at that–as opposed to first-run syndication like Judge Judy. In October into November 2021, Byrd addressed the sharpest criticisms against the program, which related to his absence: he issued public statements to the media that indicated that he was not at all communicated with about the spin-off series by Sheindlin throughout the entire 25th season of Judge Judy. In July 2021, by the completion of Judge Judy, Byrd reached out to Sheindlin to inquire if he would have a position in the spin-off program, which she addressed as negative for salary reasons. Byrd expressed to feelings of dismay, as according to him never had the opportunity to negotiate a lower salary. Ultimately, Byrd wished Sheindlin well and expressed gratitude to her for opportunities. Following season 1 of Judy Justice, it was announced that Byrd would be holding the role of bailiff for another court show produced by Sheindlin that is currently in development and to be streamed on Amazon Freevee as well. The court show, entitled Tribunal, will be presided over by now former Hot Bench judges, Tanya Acker and Patricia DiMango, along with Sheindlin's son, former district attorney Adam Levy. By the conclusion of season 1, it was reported that Judy Justice had set a record for number of streaming hours viewed on Amazon Freevee, and was thus granted a second season, which began on November 7, 2022.
- Judge Steve Harvey (ABC, Walt Disney Television, Den of Thieves, 2022–2024) An arbitration-based comedy courtroom limited-run series presided over by Steve Harvey. Atypical to most courtroom programs, the show airs in prime time as opposed to daytime. Also atypical to most court show programming, Harvey does not have a judgeship or jurisprudence background, nor does he hold any legal licenses, boasting in the show's title sequence how he is without need of any of this to resolve disputes. Rather, the court show is billed on Harvey using "good old commonsense" to resolve small-claim disputes, big-claim disputes, and everything in between. In January 2022, Harvey revealed during a guest appearance on Jimmy Kimmel Live! that he has been formally chastised by ABC executives for insulting language towards the show's litigants, referring to one in particular as "stupid" during the course of the proceedings. In sharing this news, Harvey objected to political correctness and cancel culture, complaining that celebrities can't say anything any longer.
- Adam's Law (Syndicated, Big Ticket Entertainment, CBS Television Distribution, Queen Bee Productions, 2026–present) An arbitration-based courtroom series presided over by attorney and former district attorney Adam Levy, the son of Judge Judy Sheindlin. The series is notable in that Sheindlin announced the end of her 30-year on-screen television career and saga as courtroom jurist with the arrival of Levy's program. Sheindlin's program Judy Justice will end the following month from Adam's Law's September 2026 premiere.

=== List of present-day nontraditional court shows ===
As with the original court programming era, the modern era has seen a wide variety of unconventional court shows. These are shows that do not take the typical format and procedure of most of the shows within today's judicial genre. For the most part, court shows mimic the average bench trial in small claims court, tackling miscellaneous civil matters. Unconventional court shows, on the other hand, have their own, very distinct twist that separates them dynamically from traditional courtroom programs and each other as well. Among the list of nontraditional court shows that have been produced include:

To date, the only court show that is currently on the air since before the 2000s is Divorce Court (1957), the court show genre's longest running program.

- Science Court (ABC, 1997–2000) An animated court series that was renamed "Squigglevision" in 1998. The animation mixed in courtroom drama and used the slogan: "Where science is law, and scientific thinking rules." In the court where Judge Stone (Paula Poundstone) presides, expert witnesses and courtroom demonstrations show such concepts as condensation and evaporation. Along with court stenographer Fred (Fred Stoller), who is hard of hearing (thus the need to repeat concepts) and a science reporter, Jen Betters, who serves as the audience's courtroom commentator, the regulars include: lawyers Doug Savage, who argues for the plaintiff and never wins, and attorney Allison Krempel. Krempel always has her facts straight because she is advised by science teacher Professor Parsons. As for using the courtroom setting, the creators explained that it came from the televised O. J. Simpson trial where children and adults learned more about how the nation's public justice system works than from any civics course in school.
- Judge and Jury (MSNBC, 1998–99) The hourlong daily program featured "legal teams" debating the pros and cons of various civil and criminal cases, as well as broader legal issues. The "court" is run by former L. A. Prosecutor-turned Municipal and Superior Court Judge Burton Katz. No verdict was returned. During his 13 years in the D.A.'s office, he worked on many high-profile criminal cases, including the Manson case. After serving on the bench, he turned to legal commentary for radio and television during the Simpson trial, and hosted.
- Judge Wapner's Animal Court (Animal Planet, 1998–2000) A short-lived arbitration-based reality court spin-off that brought forth the return of Joseph Wapner to the judicial genre. By the time of this return, it had been five years since his previous stint on The People's Court. Judge Wapner's Animal Court presented cases that revolved around animals. The animals in question were present in the courtroom during the proceedings. Cases ranged from personal injury to paternity, from malpractice to emotional distress, and from negligence to rightful custody.
- The Blame Game (MTV, 1999–2001) A court/game show that reunited ex-boyfriends and jilted girlfriends in a mock courtroom run by Judge Chris Reed. There, with the help of Counselors Kara McNamara and Jason Winer, they unleash insults and fret about embarrassing intimacies, bad habits and incendiary incidents that doomed their coupling. An audience that does not know them decides which person is responsible for the breakup. The winner gets a free trip to Cancun.
- Divorce Court (Syndicated, 20th Television, 1957–62, 1967–69, 1985–92, 1999–present) The show's 4th incarnation highlights former real-life couples who've previously filed for divorce, arguing their cases out before the show's arbiter. The arbiter resolves issues such as unpaid bills, medical claims, division of property, etc. The arbiter's ruling typically takes into consideration whose behavior was reprehensible or at least most reprehensible over the course of the marriage, instigating the divorce to occur. In some cases, however, the arbiter may withhold judgment to give the couple ample time to consider reconciliation. Occasionally, the show revisits an episode where time to explore reconciliation was offered to determine whether the delay remedied or worsened the marriage. While judgements may be small, tempers and resentment between the couples on the show are often ablaze. Former Los Angeles Prosecuting Attorney Mablean Ephriam first presided over this reincarnation of Divorce Court for 7 years, from the 1999–00 season through the 2005–06 season. Her tenure with the program came to an unexpected end over a failure to come to terms in contract negotiations for what would have been her 8th season. As one of the terms of a renewal contract for her to return for an 8th season, the network forbade Ephriam from changing her hairstyle, reasoning that any alternate hairstyles from her were too time-consuming. Stated Ephriam, "When will FOX and the rest of America accept our cultural differences as African Americans and embrace us with all of our different hairstyles, hair textures, hair color." In addition, production adamantly refused to update Ephriam's salary in order to match her counterparts in the court show genre. During her 7 years on the program, Ephriam was known for her quirky voice, and reactions of amusement and appall over accounts of outrageous behavior by the show's litigants. Retired Cleveland Heights Municipal Court Judge Lynn Toler (also of the court show Power of Attorney) succeeded Ephriam, beginning with the show's 8th season (2006–07) and lasting through its 21st season (2019–20). By the 2013–14 season, Toler outlasted Ephriam on the program for her 8th year presiding over Divorce Court. Toler's 14-year stint on the program is the longest judgeship to date for the series as a whole. In her own exit from the program, Toler cited discontentment and objection over what she perceived as hostile behaviors and poor management decisions coming from production. For example, Toler disfavored the move to set up shop in Atlanta for what would end up being her final season, the show relocating from Los Angeles. Another point of contention, Toler disfavored the show's adjusted courtroom used for her final season, a set design she felt to be a far too nontraditional and not reflecting the average American courtroom. Having a distinctive voice in her own right, Toler was known for her strident timbre while presiding. Level-headed and consultative, Toler imparted counsel, words of wisdom, and an effort to talk sense into the show's outrageous litigants. Faith Jenkins (of the previously cancelled and short-lived court show Judge Faith) succeeded Toler in presiding over the program by the 2020–21 television season. On January 10, 2022, it was announced that former The View Co-Host, Prosecutor, and District Attorney Star Jones would be replacing Jenkins as arbiter of the series for its milestone 40th season, beginning in fall 2022. It will be Jones's return to the court show genre, having previously presided over the 1994–95 court show Jones & Jury. Albeit short-lived, her stint on Jones & Jury makes her the first Black person to preside over a court show and the first female to preside over arbitration-based reality courtroom programming in particular.
- Arrest & Trial (USA Network, 2000–01) a multifaceted court show hosted by Brian Dennehy. The show followed famous criminal cases from arrest through trial. Producer Dick Wolf says that it is unabashedly pro-police and pro-prosecutor. It blends dramatizations with news footage and interviews with the investigators and prosecutors who made the case.
- Moral Court (Syndicated, Stu Billett Production Inc., Warner Bros. Television Distribution, 2000–2001) A short-lived courtroom program in which rulings reflected the principles of right and wrong, with the judge (Larry Elder) assessing the case from an ethical standpoint as opposed to a legal standpoint. If the "judge" found one of the parties to be simply wrong, he'd award the other party a $500 cash prize; if he found one of the parties to be guilty of a serious moral wrong, he termed it "offensive" and awarded the other party a $1,000 cash prize; if he found one of the parties to be guilty of an extreme wrong, however, he termed it "outrageous" and awarded the other party the maximum judgment of a $2,000 cash prize (the maximum award limit in most court shows is $5,000). Not only was the format unconventional in this manner (i.e. parties were referred to as the "accuser" and the "accused", rather than the plaintiff and the defendant), but the judge also stood in a booth before the litigants as opposed to sitting on a bench. Examples of cases on the program included: "There is No Santa Claus" – a mother wants to tell her child that there is a Santa Claus, but daddy says that's lying; "Naked Neighbor Sunbather" – a man objects to naked sunbathing by the woman next door; etc.
- The Prosecutors: In Pursuit of Justice (Discovery Channel, 2000–01) A dramatized court show, featuring a combination of trial recreation and interviews with the principals told from the prosecutors' point of view. The first regular segment told the story of Kenneth McDuff, a man convicted for murder, sentenced to death, paroled, and then arrested and convicted for several other murders, and finally executed in 1998. The 13-part series was done by the same group, New Dominion Pictures, that did Discovery's highest rated series, The New Detectives and The FBI Files.
- Power of Attorney (Syndicated, 20th Television, 2000–02) A short-lived court show featuring various high-profile attorneys, arguing cases for litigants in front of Andrew Napolitano and later Lynn Toler (also of Divorce Court). The emphasis in this show is on the defense attorney, not the judge's personality.
- Celebrity Justice (Syndicated, Harvey Levin Productions, 2002–2005) A combined court/entertainment news show that covers the current, breaking news legal issues of celebrities. Along with criminal matters, the focus is also on topics such as real estate lawsuits and deal-making. The series features recurring segments, such as "You Be the Judge," where viewers hear legal arguments in a mock trial, then vote online as an interactive jury panel to decide on the case. The show explores whether or not celebrities have been treated fairly within the justice system. One of the show's executive producers is Harvey Levin (also of TMZ and reporter on The People's Court).
- Crime & Punishment (NBC, 2002–04) An hour-long, drama-documentary reality court show. This non-scripted series offered viewers a look at real-life prosecutors as they prepare for and try cases. Edited to have the look and feel of a primetime drama series, Crime & Punishment chronicles actual cases brought to trial by the San Diego District Attorney's office, giving viewers an eyewitness look into the criminal justice system. The cases range from the rape to murder.
- State v. (ABC, 2002) A special order from the Arizona Supreme Court gave State v. total access to a series of homicide cases in Maricopa County. For each case, ABC News' cameras followed the preparation by both sides, even private conversations between defense lawyers and clients. Since each segment allowed only one hour per case, it included only selected takes from the trials. Cameras were actually allowed inside the jury room to record deliberations in a first time event, although several days is edited down to only a few minutes. Perhaps one of the most telling things about this series was the depiction of how jurors think.
- We, The Jury (Syndicated, Chambers Productions, Sand in My Pants Inc., Telco Productions, 2002–03) Unlike other syndicated courtroom shows which saw the judge handling disputes in the form of a bench trial, the short-lived We the Jury lived up to its title by taking its cameras into the jury room. Each episode featured an actual court case reenacted by professional performers for the purposes of drama and economy. The jurors were genuine, their decisions binding—even if they differed from the decisions made in the real case. In this respect, the court show simultaneously shared both reality-based and fictitious aspects.
- Eye for an Eye (Syndicated, Atlas Worldwide Syndications and National Lampoon, Inc., 2003–09) An outrageous and fictitious court show, Eye for an Eye was a nontraditional spectacle of trial and punishment. The daily, half-hour, syndicated courtroom show broke ground and took small claims court to places unseen since the Spanish Inquisition. Unlike any other courtroom television program, "Eye for an Eye" hosted the zany, outlandish, and harshly teasing Judge "Extreme Akim" (who outside of television was personal injury attorney Akim "The Strongarm" Anastopoulo) sentencing his litigants to draconian and unorthodox paybacks. These payback segments featured: the "guilty" party's car being run over by a bulldozer; an employer, who taunted overweight employees, wearing a fatsuit; the feeding of worms to two people arguing over ownership of a bird; making a wife abuser act as a punching dummy for a women's self-defense class; etc. The bailiff was played by former boxing champ Sugar Ray Phillips and the second co-host was Kato Kaelin. Lasting a total of five seasons, the tumultuous series is an example of fictitious courtroom show's inability to survive for very long in the present day.
- Style Court (E! network, 2003–2004) The Style Network, sister network to E TV, produces Style Court, on which people haul their friends, neighbors and co-workers into court before style expert Judge Henry Roth. These defendants were tried for alleged crimes of fashion, trend misdemeanors and other style infractions. The judge hears the evidence, consults the jury, and hands down a verdict of guilty (makeover) or not guilty (no makeover). The series features Doug Llewelyn (former host of The People's Court) as commentator.
- The Law Firm (NBC, 2005) A reality court show featuring real lawyers, real cases, and real consequences. Trial attorney and legal analyst Roy Black managed 12 actual lawyers, competing against each other while trying real court cases with judges and juries. This process resulted in outcomes that were final, legal and binding. Each week, one legal eagle was eliminated until only one remained. Cases ranged from First Amendment issues to neighbor disputes to wrongful death. Distinguished judges decided some of the cases, while a jury determines the others. In the end, the top attorney won a prize of $250,000.
- The Verdict (BBC, RDF Media, 2007) twelve celebrities form the jury in a fictional case.
- Jury Duty (Syndicated, Radar Entertainment, 2007–09) As with We, The Jury, Jury Duty is a short-lived court show that used a jury trial format as opposed the typical bench trial format adopted in most court shows. To boot, only celebrities were used as the jurors. Hearing the cases as arbitrator was American criminal defense lawyer Bruce Cutler. (See also the television court series Judge for Yourself, listed in above section).
- Speeders Fight Back (TruTV network, 2008–09) is both dependent on and spun off from the reality legal series Speeders, which was also aired on TruTV. Speeders Fight Back is a program that saw offending motorists from the Speeders program challenge the officers that pulled them over in court. Said individuals used visual aids, alibis, emotional and offbeat excuses to get out of their traffic tickets. (See also the television court series Traffic Court, listed in above section).
- Street Court (Syndicated, Litton Entertainment, 2009–10) A short-lived court show which took litigation outside of the courtroom. Former attorney Michael Mazzariello heard and ruled on cases at the scene of the dispute.
- America's Court with Judge Ross (Syndicated, Entertainment Studios 2010–present) A court show presided over by producer, communications strategist, and former California Superior Court judge Kevin A. Ross. Ross is described as showing litigants how to responsibly deal with disputes and understand the consequences of their actions. As with the genre's original court shows, cases on America's Court are performed by actors. At the end of each episode of the program, a standard disclaimer is shown that reads "All characters displayed are fictional and any resemblance to actual persons is coincidental." This is also the case with successor court shows also produced by Entertainment Studios, Justice for All, We the People, Supreme Justice with Judge Karen, Justice with Judge Mablean, and The Verdict with Judge Hatchett. Since 2023, America's Court is the longest running court show with the same judge of all the legal genre shows currently in production.
- Last Shot with Judge Gunn (Syndicated, Trifecta Entertainment & Media, 2011–13) A reality-based drug court show adjudicated by former Fayetteville, Arkansas Circuit court Judge Mary Ann Gunn. In 2012, the court show won a Daytime Emmy Award for Outstanding Legal/Courtroom Program after only its first season. To date, this is the earliest into production that any court show has received a Daytime Emmy Award. It is also the first nontraditional court program to receive a Daytime Emmy. In 2013, the show received a second Emmy nod but lost to fellow nominee and audience favorite Judge Judy. The series is based on Gunn's work as a former real-life drug court judge and is filmed in her old courtroom, located inside the historic Washington County courthouse. Because of the court show's setting in an actual courtroom, Gunn can be referred to as an actual judge on her program unlike other court show stars in the genre. The series provides drug offenders an alternative to prison and one last shot. The controversial series has come under fire by numerous real-life drug courts and support groups, its many detractors believing its contrary to the drug court model for such a serious system to be influenced by entertainment and TV ratings and insults the integrity of real-life drug courts in the public eye.
- We the People (Syndicated, Entertainment Studios, 2011–2013) (originally, We the People with Gloria Allred and in an upcoming series revival slated for 2022 We the People with Judge Lauren Lake) As with its predecessor America's Court and its successor Justice for All (both produced by Entertainment Studios as well), We the People is a staged court show. The court show initially starred American lawyer Gloria Allred playing the role of a judge before its cancellation after 2 seasons. The show is set for a 2022 series revival under the judgeship of Lauren Lake, the former arbitrator of Lauren Lake's Paternity Court. During Allred's judgeship over the series, no real money exchanged hands and non-union actors were hired to recreate real-life court cases. Producers sometimes pulled audience members on the spot to play the role of litigants. Reportedly, producers had to scream out names of the parties when the actor-litigants forgot them, causing Ms. Allred to break down in laughter. Allred was criticized for her acting abilities herself and her treatment of male "litigants" on the program.
- Justice for All with Judge Cristina Perez (Syndicated, Entertainment Studios, 2012–present) As with Entertainment Studios' two other court programs, America's Court and We the People, Justice for All is also a fictionalized court series as stated by the show's standard disclaimer. This is shown at the end in small print. The program brings forth the return of Cristina Pérez to the judicial genre, two years after the cancellation of her previous courtroom series to low ratings. Justice for All is the first bilingual television series, produced in both English and Spanish. Her promoters have described her as appealing to audiences everywhere. Pérez adjudicates in a much larger, far more striking and imposing courtroom than on her previous series. In its early going, however, the series has suffered similar ratings as Cristina's Court.
- Lauren Lake's Paternity Court (Syndicated, MGM Domestic Television Distribution and 79th and York Entertainment, 2013–2020), which originated as simply Paternity Court, is an unconventional series and tabloid talk/court show hybrid. The show is presided over by Lauren Lake. While the show's title is Paternity Court, it also looked into other situations that use DNA confirmation, such as disputes over wills. According to John Bryan, president of MGM Domestic Television Distribution, inspiration for the show came from Maury: a tabloid talk show well known for paternity cases. Added Bryan, "We also looked at what the most popular genre is in daytime and that's court. This show hits a sweet spot in daytime. Court has obviously proved itself and shows about paternity have proved themselves."
- Supreme Justice with Judge Karen (Syndicated, Entertainment Studios, 2013–present) This courtroom series is Entertainment Studios's 4th court show, Supreme Justice with Judge Karen. The show stars Karen Mills-Francis, who starred as judge in the previously cancelled short-lived predecessors: Judge Karen (produced by Sony Pictures Television) and Judge Karen's Court (produced by Litton Entertainment), respectively. As with Entertainment Studios's other fictionalized courtroom shows (America's Court, We the People, and Justice for All) Supreme Justice is likewise fictionalized.
- Justice with Judge Mablean (Syndicated, Entertainment Studios, 2014–present) Hosted by Mablean Ephriam in her second presidency over a television courtroom (after her tenure on Divorce Court), Justice is a fictionalized court show in the vein of the syndicator's other offerings.
- Hot Bench (Syndicated, Big Ticket Entertainment, Queen Bee Productions, CBS Television Distribution, 2014–present) In January 2014, it was announced that Judge Judy would produce a new court show she created titled Hot Bench, that premiered in fall 2014. It features: Patricia DiMango, a New York State Supreme Court Justice from Brooklyn, and two LA attorneys; Tanya Acker; and Larry Bakman, presiding over small claims cases pulled from all over the country. The idea for a three-judge panel arose from Judy Sheindlin's trip to Ireland. Stated Sheindlin, “When my husband Jerry and I were in Ireland recently, we visited the courts and watched a three-judge bench, which I found both fascinating and compelling. I immediately thought what a terrific and unique idea for a television program that brings the court genre to the next level.”
- The Trial: A Murder in the Family (Dragonfly, 2017, Channel 4) A fictional case with a real legal counsel, judge and jury.
- The High Court with Doug Benson (Comedy Central, 2017–present) A comedic show that is presided over by Doug Benson, while he is under the influence of cannabis. All of the cases featured are real and Benson's rulings are real and legally binding.
- Couples Court with the Cutlers (Syndicated, Orion Television, 2017–present) This court show, presided over by married law firm partners Keith and Dana Cutler specializes in cases of adultery. Litigants on Couples Court present evidence to the Cutlers, usually involving electronic communications and surveillance, to confirm or disprove an affair.
- Caught in Providence (Syndicated, Debmar-Mercury, 2018–2021; Law & Crime Network/Facebook Watch, 2020–2023) This series, while it made its national debut in 2018, originated in Providence, Rhode Island as a local show in the 1990s, where it aired on public-access television, then on WLNE-TV. The series features real-life minor criminal offenses and traffic violations brought before Judge Frank Caprio, whose brother Joseph Caprio created the series. Caprio retired from the bench in 2023.
- Personal Injury Court (Syndicated, MGM Television, 2019–2020) Designed as a companion series to Paternity Court and Couples Court, Personal Injury Court featured scripted personal injury law cases presided over by former Fulton County, Georgia trial judge M. Gino Brogdon. Prior to television, Brogdon served as an arbitrator of real life personal injury cases since 2002. The program is "inspired" by actual personal injury cases, but actors are used to play the litigants.
- Protection Court (Trifecta Entertainment & Media, Scott Sternberg Productions, 2019–2020) This court show takes place in the confines of a legitimate court, taking advantage of the state of Florida's generous allowances for court proceedings to be televised; it follows proceedings at the Lawson E. Thomas Courthouse in Dade County, Florida under presiding judge Carroll Kelly, edited and formatted in the same style as arbitration-based court shows. Protection Court focuses on restraining orders of protection.
- Murder, Mystery and My Family (Chalkboard TV, BBC Television, 2018–2021) British non-traditional court show in which historical cases in Britain sentenced to the death penalty (typically murder) are reexamined by senior barristers for the prosecution and defence for a posthumous hearing and potential reprieve by semi-retired senior judge David Radford.
- Gary Busey: Pet Judge (Streaming, Amazon Prime Video, 2020) A nontraditional comedy courtroom miniseries that ran 6 episodes and was presided over by Gary Busey.
- Murder Trial (BBC, 2021–2026) Scottish High Court gives exceptional access to murder trials.
- The Jury: Murder Trial (Channel 4, 2024) Two juries reach a verdict on a reenactment of a real murder trial.

=== Daytime Emmy Awards ===
The judicial genre became a category in the Daytime Emmy Awards for the first time in 2008, titled Outstanding Legal/Courtroom Program, removing them from competition against daytime talk shows in the previously more generic Outstanding Daytime Talk Series category.

Up until 2012, all of the annually presented awards went to freshman court shows that had only recently emerged into the genre at the time of their rewarding. Cristina's Court (only lasting three seasons, from 2006 to 2009) was the first court show to win a Daytime Emmy Award as well as the first court show to win more than once and consecutively three times, holding this record for nine years. This albeit short-lived court show won the Outstanding Legal/Courtroom Program Award in 2008 (two seasons into its run), 2009, and 2010 (the series cancelled by this period).

Judge Pirro (2008–2011) won in 2011, upon being cancelled just two seasons into its run. Last Shot with Judge Gunn (2011–present) won in 2012, only a season into its run. To date, this represents the earliest into production that any court show has ever received a Daytime Emmy. Moreover, Last Shot is the first nontraditional courtroom series to receive a Daytime Emmy.

On June 14, 2013, however, Judge Judy became the first long-running, highly rated court show to receive an Emmy, which landed on its 15th nomination, the court show nominated numerous times before this category existed and competing with miscellaneous talk shows. Judge Judy went on to win 2 additional Daytime Emmy Awards, later along with The People's Court, both matching Christina's Court. Judge Mathis is the first African American presided court show to win the honor, succeeded by Lauren Lake's Paternity Court (cancelled a year later). In June 2021, The People's Court secured its 5th win for the category, which now gives it the most wins for the court show genre. By June 2022 when Judy Justice won for its first season, Judy Sheindlin became the only arbitrator to win this category for more than one television program, both her 2 court shows. The People's Court would win the 2023 honor in its last season in production with Marilyn Millian.

=== Diversity ===
Unlike the original era of court shows, the 2nd era consists of a great deal of gender, ethnic and racial diversity. In 2001, reportedly seven of the ten judges were male; however, six of these judges were Black, four Black males and two Black females. Four were White. Since 2008, female television judges have outnumbered their male counterparts. Additionally, four judges were Latina/o and another four were Black. Judge Judy Sheindlin and Judge David Young (an openly gay male) were the only non-Hispanic whites. As of the 2025–2026 television season, five of the fourteen court shows in production feature male judges such as Kevin A. Ross of America's Court with Judge Ross. Eleven of the shows either star or feature a Black arbiter, two are hosted by Latinas, and three are hosted by or feature White arbiters.

It has been argued that television judge demographics can distort images of real-life judge demographics. Real-life judge demographics show sharp contrasts to television judge demographics. Women are only 18.6% of federal judges and about 20% of state judges. Only 3% of judges are black in the United States. Overwhelmingly, American judges are White males. A study noted that "television court shows may reduce support for increased racial and gender diversity on the bench by sending a message to the public that United States benches are already diverse."

- Although only a short-lived stint, American lawyer, journalist, writer, and television personality Star Jones is the first Black person to serve as a "judge" in a court show (Jones and Jury, which aired from 1994 to 1995). Former Shelby County, Tennessee, Criminal Court judge, Judge Joe Brown, is the first Black male to preside over a court show and the first Black person to preside over a long-running courtroom series. Arriving on the scene in September 1998, Brown's courtroom series, Judge Joe Brown, was the second highest rated program in the court show genre for its entire run. Since their arrivals, there have been numerous other Black judges, such as Greg Mathis of the NAACP Image Award winning court show, Judge Mathis; Mablean Ephriam and later Judge Lynn Toler of Divorce Court; Glenda Hatchett of Judge Hatchett; etc.
- Greg Mathis of Judge Mathis became the longest reigning African American court show arbitrator by 2014–15, reaching its 16th season. Mathis is also the second longest serving court show arbitrator behind Judith Sheindlin of Judge Judy.
- Marilyn Milian (The People's Court's 4th and first female judge) is the first Hispanic court show arbitrator to arrive on the scene. Since her arrival, there's been several other Hispanic arbitrators, including Alex Ferrer (Judge Alex), Maria Lopez (Judge Maria Lopez), Cristina Pérez (Cristina's Court and Justice for All with Judge Christina Pérez ), etc. Cristina Pérez is the first Hispanic judge to cross over from Spanish-language to English-language television. Though her ancestry is Colombian as opposed to Mexican or Cuban.
- David Young, of television's Judge David Young, and Robert Rinder, of Judge Rinder, are openly gay television jurists.
- Being the 2nd arbitration-based reality court show, second only to Joseph Wapner (first star of reality court shows) on The People's Court, Judge Judy Sheindlin of Judge Judy is the first female judge of arbitration-based reality court shows and the first Paramount star as a TV judge.
- Judge Romesh was the first Asian to host a court show.
- Chrissy Teigen is set to be the first Asian woman to host a court show.
- On most of court strips, the bailiffs tend to be the opposite gender of the judge. In addition, many of them tend to be of a different race as well.

=== Criticisms and acclaim ===
- Supporters of reality court shows have praised court programming as beneficial to the public because they feel it reveals to viewers information as to how the legal system works.
- A study found that court shows may have a positive influence in encouraging interest in jury proceedings, but may also have a negative influence by distorting people's perception of courts.
- Detractors of reality court shows criticize these programs as being unrepresentative of the real-world job of judging, feeling that most of these court shows consist of judges that are much too uncivil, abusive, condescending and antagonistic. The court shows that ascend in popularity are "most troubling" as they are believed to be most likely to potentially reflect people's opinions of the legal system. Concerns that have been raised are that court shows may: reduce respect for the bench, lead to a general misinterpretation of judicial behavior and temperament, alter people's expectations about the legal system, and participants in real-life cases may adopt inappropriate behaviors based upon the behaviors of those found in court shows.
- A study on reality court shows has noted that if judges actually behaved the way most television show judges do, they would face disciplinary consequences for conduct unbecoming of a judge. While each television judge's personality and style varies from those of other television judges, it has been noted that most present-day court programs typically show a very strong judge who questions parties, challenges them, interrupts them and does so rudely.
- Court shows are a simple, repeatable format. It has a conflict and resolution in a tight package, and if you have a central host that's compelling and authentic, it all comes together into something that is pretty formulaic and works.
- Court shows are regarded as a safe bet for producers as they are arguably the cheapest format on contemporary American television. The shows require a minimal set, minimal paid on-screen talent, and minimal pre- and post- production; an entire 39-week season is typically shot in less than two months production time, and the episodic, evergreen nature of court shows allows them to be rerun without being noticed. More than cost considerations, however, court shows are valued for their sheer efficiency as compelling television.

== Court-related networks ==
- Court TV (1991–2008, 2019–). Traditionally, the network was dedicated solely to court- and legal-based shows, capturing live footage from actual homicidal trials, criminal justice programming, and reruns of such shows as NYPD Blue and Cops. In 2008, Court TV was rebranded as truTV as the network has branched out into more "caught on video" reality programs. Court TV's news division was merged with HLN in 2008, and currently HLN's daytime format is structured with more pundit analysis than Court TV's original format. TruTV ended all courtroom programming on September 27, 2013, with the cancellation of In Session. Court TV relaunched in 2019 as a digital subchannel network, after Katz Broadcasting purchased the intellectual property from the dissolving Turner Broadcasting System that originally owned Court TV.
- Justice Central.TV (2012–present) On December 10, 2012, Byron Allen's Entertainment Studios launched its eighth first-run syndication network, Justice Central.TV: a 24-hour, HD legal news and court show network that captures court proceedings, news, talk, and entertainment. Its original programming includes Entertainment Studios' staged court shows.
- Justice Network (2015–2020) relied on the CourtTV and TruTV programming back catalogs. It rebranded as True Crime Network in 2020 to emphasize its true crime programming.
- Law & Crime Network, a service established by Dan Abrams, includes legal news discussion and live trial coverage.
- Judge Nosey (2020–present) is an online network devoted to daytime court shows. It is operated by Nosey as a spin-off from its main service, which focuses mostly on tabloid talk shows and reality dating series.
- Pluto TV Courtroom (2021–present) is a network dedicated to some popular court shows from the CBS Media Ventures library, such as Judge Judy, Swift Justice, Judge Mills Lane, etc. (Pluto TV and CBS Media Ventures are both Paramount Global subsidiaries.)

== See also ==
- Legal drama
- Reality television
- Dramatic programming
