= Your Witness =

Your Witness may refer to:

- Your Witness (film), a 1950 British crime film directed by and starring Robert Montgomery
- Your Witness (TV series), an American television series
