= Relative Justice =

American reality court show (2021–2023)

- Genre: Arbitration-based reality court show
- Directed by: Miguel Enciso
- Starring: Rhonda Wills (judge) Brandon White (bailiff)
- Country of origin: United States
- Original language: English
- No. of seasons: 2
- No. of episodes: 304

Production
- Executive producers: Misdee Wrigley Miller; Ross Babbit; Barry Bloom; Lou Dennig; Gary Apple
- Production location: Lexington, Kentucky
- Camera setup: Multi-camera
- Running time: 20-22 minutes
- Production companies: Wrigley Media Group; Bloom ‘N Apple Entertainment

Original release
- Network: Syndication
- Release: September 13, 2021 – March 7, 2023

Relative Justice is an American arbitration-based reality court show presided over by Texas, California, and New York State licensed attorney Judge Rhonda Wills.

Relative Justice is produced by Wrigley Media Group, in association with Bloom 'N Apple Entertainment. It is executive produced by Misdee Wrigley Miller, Ross Babbit, Barry Bloom and court show veteran Lou Dennig (formerly of Judge Joe Brown). The show is distributed by David Bulhack of Big Fish Entertainment LLC. It was taped in Lexington, Kentucky at LEX Studios, a film and TV production facility in the city's Woodhill neighborhood that had been converted from a former movie theater before the show's production commenced.

The series focuses on inter-family legal disputes and premiered in first-run syndication on September 13, 2021. The show's last episode aired on March 7, 2023 and reruns continued until September 8, 2023. The show's courtroom set was then used and remodeled for the newly syndicated court show Cutlers Court.
