= Lauren Lake's Paternity Court =

American reality court show (2013–2020)

- Also known as: Paternity Court (2013–2014)
- Created by: David Armour
- Directed by: Stacie Saugen
- Starring: Lauren Lake (judge); Jerome Hamilton (bailiff); Ron Cross (bailiff)
- Theme music composer: Devin Powers
- Country of origin: United States
- Original language: English
- No. of seasons: 7
- No. of episodes: 840

Production
- Executive producer: David Armour
- Production locations: Sunset Bronson Studios, Los Angeles, California (season 1) Georgia Public Broadcasting Studios, Atlanta, Georgia (seasons 2–7)
- Camera setup: Multiple
- Running time: 30 minutes
- Production companies: 79th & York Entertainment; Orion Television; Georgia Film Office (2014–2020) (seasons 2–7); Lauren Lake Limitless Entertainment (2018–2020) (seasons 6–7)

Original release
- Network: Syndication
- Release: September 23, 2013 – February 29, 2020

Lauren Lake's Paternity Court (originally known as Paternity Court) is a nontraditional court show in which family lawyer and legal analyst Lauren Lake heard and ruled on paternity cases and rendered DNA test results.

The show was produced by 79th & York Entertainment and Orion Television, and was distributed by MGM Domestic Television Distribution. Paternity Court was executive produced by David Armour, and directed by Stacie Saugen. The series was MGM's first first-run syndication series to come to the market after a lull period in this arena.

Paternity Court premiered on Monday, September 23, 2013. The court show's first day of taping was on June 13, 2013. By the 2nd season, Lake's name was added to the title of the series, Lauren Lake's Paternity Court. Production also moved from Los Angeles to the Georgia Public Broadcasting studios in Atlanta that season.

In 2019, following its 6th season, the show received a Daytime Emmy Award for Outstanding Legal/Courtroom Program. After its 7th season in early 2020, however, Lauren Lake's Paternity Court ended production, confirmed as cancelled by 2021. MGM discarded of all of its courtroom programming following financial struggles from the COVID-19 pandemic and new owner Amazon's disinterest in broadcast syndication.

== Conception ==
Reports of the series first emerged in December 2012. As early as December 2012, 9 months before its debut, the court show had already been sold in 75% of the country. Stations acquired the show on an all-barter basis with 3½ minutes of local and 3½ minutes of national advertising time in every episode. By August 2013, the show was sold in 92% of the country.

An article in Broadcasting & Cable talking about the conception of the show listed the paternity test-focused episodes of the daytime talk show Maury as a direct inspiration for Paternity Court, as Bryan said in the article that the high ratings for Maury among women 25–54 and the popularity of the court show genre made fusing the two concepts possible. Weigel Broadcasting president Neal Sabin, whose station group was among the first to take the program, thought it was a natural fit for the court show-heavy lineup on his stations, saying it was 'a little bit Maury and a little bit court-y'.

Producers of the series have argued at the same time that Paternity Court and Maury do contrast, as Paternity Court does not focus on the narrative of Maury in building tabloid drama solely from the "who's your daddy?" question posed by paternity tests and the issues of multiple partners possibly being so with only bare follow-ups by that show's staff, but instead uses the tests on their show to build long-term relationships in a healthy manner once those results are revealed. As reported in late 2012, court programming is the second highest-rated genre on daytime television. Bryan has stated the goal of Paternity Court is to reinvigorate the court show genre.

== Format ==
Paternity Court is a half-hour hybrid of a talk show using the court show plaintiff/defendant format. Lake talks to the show's litigants and decides cases based upon the results of DNA tests. While the show's title is Paternity Court, it also looks into other situations using DNA verification, such as probate disputes over wills, which are litigated under a binding arbitration arrangement.

In late January 2013, creator David Armour revealed several details of the MGM conflict-resolution strip with Lauren Lake:

"We're not talking about someone who broke another person's sunglasses; these are life-altering decisions. There is a beginning, middle and end to each story. But then there's what happens after the paternity test results. We don't take any of this lightly. There is a responsible side to the show where we help families get on the right path."

The program "plans to bring something ... interesting but with a truly positive resolution."

Most episodes end with Lake revealing the results of a paternity test, but this doesn't happen in every episode. The show covers a wide range of cases.

Armour has stated that, "We want to dig into these stories much deeper than any other court show does. We're dealing with substantial issues. On this show, we're dealing with resolutions about how families can move forward now that they have [paternity test] results."

Unlike most present-day court shows which typically have two cases in each episode, Paternity Court only focuses on one case per episode, though a second case can make an uncommon appearance. Lake takes time before and after the results to speak with her litigants.

== Location ==
Original plans for Paternity Court were to film the series from a real-life courtroom, though this later changed to a traditional studio setting. The first season of the show was taped from Sunset Bronson Studios in Los Angeles, next to the Judge Judy set, leasing over the space previously used for Big Ticket Television's Judge Joe Brown until its 2013 cancellation. Beginning with season 2, production moved to Georgia Public Broadcasting Studios in Atlanta. The site was previously utilized by Swift Justice with Nancy Grace in the 2010–11 season. As with many Atlanta-based productions, the show also received tax credits from the Georgia Film Office for producing the show in Georgia, and the GFO had an end credit for their support.

== Series end ==
Lauren Lake's Paternity Court ceased production after the 2019–20 television season (the show's 7th season). Due to the financial decline of the show's distributor, MGM, Paternity Court ended production along with its sister shows Couples Court with the Cutlers and Personal Injury Court. Resulting from the 2020 COVID-19 pandemic, the MGM studio also went up for sale. The show, however, aired in reruns but ratings for the show are not calculated due to nonexistence of a partnership between MGM and Nielsen ratings. The end of the aforementioned court shows are also rooted in MGM's station clientele consisting of lower-rated networks like The CW and MyNetworkTV.

After its conclusion, Lake launched a podcast series about her show in July 2020, featuring highlights of its "most popular, shocking, and provocative cases" in conjunction with Audio Up.

It was announced on June 22, 2021, that Lake will return to television in a revival of the courtroom series, We the People, previously helmed by Gloria Allred. Lake will preside over her own edition of the series We the People with Judge Lauren Lake. Similarly to its first installment with Allred, the court show will be produced by Byron Allen's Entertainment Studios, airing on JusticeCentralTV. The show is set to join a series of sister television court shows of that network including America's Court with Judge Ross, Justice for All with Judge Cristina Perez, Justice with Judge Mablean, Supreme Court with Judge Karen and The Verdict with Judge Hatchett.

== Sister shows ==
Paternity Court has two sister shows: Couples Court with the Cutlers, which was hosted by Keith and Dana Cutler and follows a similar approach of using evidence and testing to prove or disprove infidelity; and Personal Injury Court, which is hosted by Gino Brogdon and saw personal injury cases. All three court shows ended production in the wake of the COVID-19 pandemic, later confirmed as cancelled.
