= Justice by Any Means =

Television series

- Genre: Documentary
- Presented by: Faith Jenkins
- Country of origin: United States
- Original language: English
- No. of seasons: 1
- No. of episodes: 7

Production
- Running time: 42 minutes

Original release
- Network: TV One
- Release: December 7, 2015 – January 25, 2016

Justice by Any Means is an American documentary television program that premiered on TV One on December 7, 2015. Hosted by television show judge Faith Jenkins, the one-hour true crime reenactment program features various cases involving African Americans trying to "unravel mysterious crimes and find justice for a loved one." For the 2016 episodes, actor Malik Yoba replaced Faith Jenkins.

== Episodes ==
No.	Title	Original release date
1	"Marcelle Duncan"	December 7, 2015
2	"Sharon Williams"	December 14, 2015
3	"Lynda Whitehead"	December 21, 2015
4	"Mark Cooley"	January 4, 2016
5	"Janice Clark"	January 11, 2016
6	"Melissa Kountz"	January 18, 2016
7	"Thomas Haynesworth"	January 25, 2016
