= Jones & Jury =

American reality court show (1994–1995)

- Genre: Nontraditional arbitration-based reality court show
- Directed by: Jerry Kupcinet
- Judges: Star Jones
- Country of origin: United States
- Original language: English
- No. of seasons: 1

Production
- Executive producer: Howard Schultz
- Producer: Ed Leon
- Production companies: Lighthearted Entertainment; Group W Productions

Original release
- Network: Syndication
- Release: September 12, 1994 – May 5, 1995

Jones & Jury (also known as Jones and Jury) is an American nontraditional arbitration-based reality court show presided over by former Brooklyn Prosecutor and District Attorney Star Jones.

Jones & Jury was the second arbitration-based reality show, following The People's Court.

The series aired in first-run syndication for eight months, from September 1994 to May 1995. It was produced by Lighthearted Entertainment.

The program made Star Jones the first African American to preside over a court show and the first female to preside over arbitration-based reality courtroom program, with only Joseph Wapner preceding her.

Jones gained widespread recognition shortly after her stint on Jones & Jury for her 9 seasons on daytime talk show The View, from 1997–98 through 2005–06. On January 10, 2022, it was announced that Jones would return to the court show genre, presiding over the longest-running courtroom series Divorce Court beginning with its milestone 40th season on September 19, 2022.

== Format ==
Jones & Jury was a unique blend of a talk show and arbitration-based reality court show. The program featured small claims cases from southern California courts. Audience participation set this show apart from other programs in the genre. Not only did the judge question the litigants but the audience also had the opportunity to ask questions. After Jones dispensed common sense jury instructions, the audience voted on a verdict. In the end, Jones made the final decision, rendering legally binding judgments. The cases ranged from minor disputes to more serious issues, including credit card fraud within families.
