= Faith Jenkins =

American attorney and media personality

- Jenkins in 2024
- Born: Faith Elizabeth Jenkins; September 21, 1977 (age 49)
- Education: Louisiana Tech University (BA); Southern University (JD)
- Occupations: Attorney; judge; legal commentator; television host
- Title: Miss Louisiana (2000)
- Spouse: Kenny Lattimore (m. 2020)
- Children: 2
- Website: www.faithjenkins.com

Faith Elizabeth Lattimore (née Jenkins; born September 21, 1977) is an American attorney, legal commentator and media personality. On March 11, 2014, she joined MSNBC as a legal analyst. She was the "presiding judge" over the long-running courtroom series Divorce Court from 2020 to 2022. She was also the arbitrator on Judge Faith, a daytime court show, where she rendered decisions in a television courtroom. The court show ended production in 2018.

== Early life and education ==
A native of Louisiana, she graduated from C. E. Byrd High School in Shreveport, Louisiana and attended Louisiana Tech University where she earned a bachelor's degree in political science.

Jenkins was involved in beauty pageants and won several major titles. She was the first African-American woman to win the Miss Louisiana Tech title. In 2000, she won the Miss Louisiana title and advanced to compete in the Miss America 2001 competition, where she was named first runner-up, winner of the Quality of Life award, and preliminary winner in swimsuit and talent.

Jenkins earned her Juris Doctor from the Southern University Law Center in Baton Rouge, Louisiana, where she was ranked first in her class.

== Personal life ==
On March 8, 2020, Jenkins married singer Kenny Lattimore. In August 2022, they announced that they were expecting their first child. Their daughter was born on January 17, 2023. They later had a son, born in May 2026.

== Career ==
She started her legal career in the New York City office of Sidley Austin. After five years as a litigator, she was an Assistant District Attorney, prosecuting criminals at the Manhattan District Attorney's Office.

Jenkins has appeared on CNN, MSNBC, Fox News Channel and Fox Business Channel as a legal analyst, on shows including Fox & Friends, The O'Reilly Factor, Hannity, Politics Nation with Rev. Al Sharpton, Studio B with Shepard Smith, Happening Now, Lou Dobbs Forum, Your World with Neil Cavuto, and Willis Report, as well as truTV's In Session. She has also contributed opinion editorials addressing current events in the New York Daily News.

On May 29, 2014, it was announced that she would headline as a judge on daytime TV show Judge Faith, a "nationally syndicated arbitration-based court" TV series which premiered September 22, 2014 and ended in 2017.

Jenkins is also a host of true crime documentary series entitled Justice by Any Means, which premiered on December 7, 2015, on TV One.

From 2020 to 2022, Jenkins was the presiding judge on Divorce Court. She left the show in September 2022 and was replaced by Star Jones.

Jenkins now hosts Killer Relationship with Faith Jenkins on Oxygen.

== See also ==
- Laura Wasser

Awards and achievements
Preceded by Julie Lawrence	Miss Louisiana; 2000	Succeeded by Kati Guyton
