= Lauren Lake =

American lawyer, interior designer, author, businesswoman and consultant

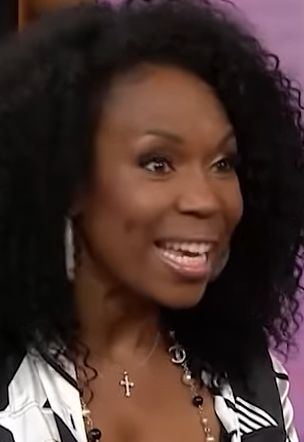
- Lake during an interview in November 2019
- Born: Lauren Laniece Howard; July 12, 1969 (age 57); Detroit, Michigan, U.S.
- Other names: Lauren J. Howard; Lauren Lake Woods
- Education: University of Michigan (BA); Wayne State University (JD)
- Occupations: Lawyer, talk show host, television personality
- Years active: 1995–present
- Known for: Lauren Lake's Paternity Court

Lauren Laniece Lake (born July 12, 1969) is an American family lawyer, television judge, and talk show presenter.

Lake has performed in guest hosting and news anchoring positions for various talk shows and reality legal programs. In much of her guest hosting, she has discussed racial, ethnic, gender, and political issues. She was the host of HGTV's how-to series Spice Up My Kitchen.

Lake is best known for arbitrating as the presiding judge over her own tabloid talk/nontraditional courtroom series, Lauren Lake's Paternity Court. The series ran for seven seasons and was nominated for a Daytime Emmy Award five times, including a win in 2019.

== Early life and education ==
Lake was born in Detroit, Michigan. Describing her parents, Lake said, "These were Black people who fought their way through, one Ph.D. at a time, so they were big on education." As a child, Lake sang, danced, and acted in plays. Lake attended Mercy High School in Farmington Hills, Michigan, and was a National Merit Scholar in 1986.

In May 1990, Lake earned a Bachelor of Arts degree in English from the University of Michigan in Ann Arbor, Michigan. She earned a secondary teacher certification that same year. In May 1993, Lake earned a Juris Doctor from Wayne State University Law School in Detroit, Michigan. She paid for her college education by singing on the weekends.

In June 1995, she was admitted to the State Bar of Michigan and began her law career as a criminal defense attorney. In June 2002, she was admitted to the New York State Bar Association and the New Jersey State Bar Association, where her practice is predominantly devoted to entertainment and family law. Lake began designing professionally after graduating from law school.

== Entertainment work ==
In 1999, Lake relocated to New York City to work in entertainment. She sang background for Mary J. Blige, Sean "Puff Daddy" Combs, Jay-Z, Dr. Dre, and Snoop Dogg. Lake also began writing, recording, and publicly performing her own music, eventually creating her own production company.

Lake appeared on To Live and Date in New York, which chronicled the dating lives of New York women. The series aired on Women's Entertainment Channel as "Single in the City." Lake served as a correspondent, expert and life coach on The Greg Behrendt Show and as a legal and relationship expert and life coach on The Ricki Lake Show, for two seasons. She also served as field correspondent, makeover specialist, and judge on The Ricki Lake Show.

Lake has made guest appearances on Dr. Phil and The View as a legal expert. She has also appeared on The Today Show, The O'Reilly Factor, The Bill Cunningham Show, Regis & Kelly, Montel Williams, and The Morning Show with Mike and Juliet. Lake has served as a guest host/anchor and legal analyst for MSNBC and TruTV. Since 2005, Lake has been a regular on-air commentator on CNN, Headline News, Fox News Channel, and CNBC. She was also the subject of an episode of Modern Hero in 2017.

Lake is also a regular contributor to Black Entertainment Television's Meet the Faith and My Two Cents. She has participated in TLC shows such as While You Were Out and Trading Spaces. Between May 2007 through 2009, Lake hosted 47 episodes of HGTV's how-to show Spice Up My Kitchen. Lake has acknowledged her lack of formal design training, stating that it allows her to think outside the box.

Lake presided over her own tabloid talk/courtroom series, Lauren Lake's Paternity Court, which began on September 23, 2013, and was produced by MGM Television. and ran for 8 seasons until it was cancelled in 2021. Lake heard and decided paternity cases and rendered DNA test results.

Lake has frequently participated as a guest legal expert on Power 105.1 FM. She has also been a regular guest on the Tom Joyner Morning Show and Michael Baisden radio show. She has been a guest on WBLS New York, and guest on-air host for Radio One's WDBZ in Cincinnati.

In June 2021, Entertainment Studios ordered a revival of the daily court show We the People with Lake taking over for Gloria Allred. It premiered in 2022.

== Other work ==
Between 1999 and 2002, Lake was the vice president of DS Recordings Inc. Since September 2000, Lake has also been the co-owner of L Style Design Studios, LLC, in Fort Lee, N.J., an interior design service.

Since 2006, Lake has run the Law Offices of Lauren Lake, located in New York City, Saddlebrook, New Jersey, and Southfield, Michigan where she acts as the sole practitioner. She worked on civil and criminal matters, including divorce, child custody and support, and paternity. She has also handled felony and misdemeanor trials, involving arson, criminal sexual conduct, theft, weapons, assault, and possession of controlled substances. She is a member of The Metropolitan Bar Association, Association of Black Women Lawyers, and Black Entertainment and Sports Lawyers Association. Lake is the co-founder of the Women in Entertainment Empowerment Network (WEEN) which promotes the positive portrayal of women in entertainment and society.

Lake has presented as a motivational speaker. She participated in Bill Cosby's Call Out speaking tour in 2006. Lake also appears in Cosby's book Come on, People: On the Path from Victims to Victor.

Lake's book, "Girl! Let Me Tell You...," was published in 2009. In the book, Lake answers questions about life and love, posed by single women.

== Personal life ==
In 2007, Lake married former NFL coach and sports trader Carlos Woods. The couple have a son.
