= Your Witness (TV series) =

- Genre: Dramatized court show
- Starring: Edmund Lowe
- Country of origin: United States
- Original language: English
- No. of seasons: 1

Production
- Camera setup: Multi-camera
- Running time: 24–26 minutes

Original release
- Network: ABC
- Release: September 19, 1949 – 1950

Your Witness is an American dramatized court show that aired on the ABC network from September 19, 1949, to September 26, 1950. The 30-minute program first aired on Mondays at 8 P.M. EST, then moved to Sundays at 9 P.M., and ended up on Wednesdays at 9 P.M. It was based around real-life cases.

Edmund Lowe starred in the program, which originated in Chicago from WENR.

Your Witness was nominated for an Emmy Award for Best Live Show in 1950.
