= Michael Mazzariello =

American lawyer

- Born: May 11, 1951 (age 75); New Lots, Brooklyn, New York City
- Occupations: Attorney; Arbitrator; Television personality
- Known for: Street Court

Michael Mazzariello (born May 11, 1951) is an attorney and television personality known for his syndicated courtroom show Street Court where he makes rulings at the scene of the dispute. He also has been featured as a legal expert on CNN, Court TV, and MSNBC. Before starting his show in 2009, Mazzariello had previously served as an assistant district attorney in Brooklyn and a high-profile plaintiffs' and criminal defense lawyer. Mayor Rudolph Giuliani appointed him as the Chief Prosecutor for the New York City Board of Education and he has also served as an adjunct instructor at Marist College. He has never been a judge, although he did unsuccessfully run for town justice of Newburgh, New York in 2003.
