= Street Court =

American television series

- Genre: Nontraditional court show
- Created by: Michael Mazzariello
- Presented by: Michael Mazzariello (a.k.a. Judge Mazz)
- Starring: Michael Mazzariello (a.k.a. Judge Mazz)
- Narrated by: Ben Patrick Johnson
- Country of origin: United States
- Original language: English
- No. of seasons: 1

Production
- Executive producer: Chris Strand
- Production location: varies
- Running time: 30 minutes
- Production companies: Strand Creative Group; MM Productions; Litton Entertainment

Original release
- Network: Syndication
- Release: September 21, 2009 – May 2010

Street Court is an American nontraditional court show syndicated for one season by Mt. Pleasant, South Carolina-based Litton Entertainment and hosted by Michael Mazzariello, also referred to as Judge Mazz. Unlike other courtroom shows, Street Court travels across the United States and holds court at the scene of the dispute.

Barter advertising sales were completely handled by NBC Universal Domestic Television Distribution Advertising and Media Sales.

== Production ==
Michael Mazzariello had developed the concept and was pointed to a manager through Nancy Grace during a commercial break in her talk show where he was a guest legal expert. Two weeks later, they had a demo reel. Mazzariello's pitch was "Just imagine a judge show where the judge goes to the location."

Strand Creative Group signed on to produce the show. “Mazz in the Hood” and "Street Justice" were considered as show names. Justice was rejected as too "vigilante" and Mazz as too frivolous. About September 2009, Strand began filming Street Court.

Street Court was cleared in 94% of its television markets in the single season produced, and appeared to be well received. The show appeared to be popular in larger markets and especially so in New York, where WPIX aired the show in mid-afternoon. Nevertheless, Litton choose not to renew Street Court after just one season (citing low ratings in other markets) and replaced the series in most of the markets with Judge Karen's Court, a new standard court room series presided over by Karen Mills-Francis, whose Judge Karen was canceled after one season.

== Host ==
Judge Mazz, a New York resident, is characterized by a strong Brooklyn accent and introduced the term "huckalero". Judge Mazz frequently uses it to describe alleged deception on the part of defendants, though he never explained on-air what huckalero means or where it originated. Judge Mazz ends every case with the quote, "That's my ruling, that's it."

Judge Mazzariello was an experience attorney being an Assistant District Attorney in Brooklyn, his founding of the nonprofit East New York Legal Services, and his role as Chief Prosecutor for the New York City Board of Education during the Giuliani administration. The City University of New York School of Law website cites him as an alum.

The East New York native worked as an assistant district attorney in Brooklyn from 1990 to 1993 and chief prosecutor for the Board of Education from 1995 to 1998.

== Reception ==
The Los Angeles Times reviewed Street Court and other court shows and gave the show 4 gavels out of 5, which only two received behind Judge Judy's 5 gavels.
