= We the People (court show) =

American court show

- Genre: Dramatized court show
- Judges: Gloria Allred (2011–2013); Lauren Lake (2022–)
- Country of origin: United States
- Original language: English
- No. of seasons: 5

Production
- Executive producer: Byron Allen
- Running time: 42 minutes (2011–2013); 22 minutes (2022–)
- Production company: Allen Media Group

Original release
- Network: Syndication
- Release: September 12, 2011 – 2013
- Release: September 12, 2022 – present

We the People (originally We the People with Gloria Allred, now We the People with Judge Lauren Lake) is an American dramatized court show that originally ran for 2 seasons, debuting on September 12, 2011, and airing in first-run syndication. The series was originally presented by celebrity lawyer Gloria Allred.

The series was revived in 2022 with family lawyer and legal analyst Lauren Lake presiding as arbitrator. It was renamed We the People with Judge Lauren Lake to reflect this.

== with Gloria Allred (2011–13) ==
The series depicted reenactments of real-life court cases, with Allred playing a judge character. Most of the cases were part scripted and part improvised, with audience participation. No money exchanged hands after the "judgment". This format was similar to other Entertainment Studios' court shows, such as America's Court with Judge Ross, Justice for All with Judge Cristina Perez, and Supreme Justice with Judge Karen.

We the People With Gloria Allred was renewed for its second and third seasons in March 2012, but NBC Owned Television Stations did not continue to air the series after its first season. During the 2012–2013 season, Entertainment Studios' court shows were the lowest rated in the entire court show genre and We the People was scored the lowest of the three court shows produced by the company.

== with Lauren Lake (2022–) ==
In 2021, Byron Allen's Entertainment Studios announced a revival of the program in the fall of 2022, with family lawyer and legal analyst Lauren Lake as presiding judge. Lake hosted the Daytime Emmy Award winning court show Lauren Lake's Paternity Court for 7 seasons. It premiered in 2022.

In May 2025, this show along with the other Allen Media Group court shows were renewed for 2 more seasons, running through the 2026–27 television season.
