= The Blame Game (American game show) =

US television series

The Blame Game is an American 30-minute nontraditional court-game show that premiered in January 1999 on MTV. The show ran for 2 seasons of over 130 episodes.

== Overview ==
In the show, two exes are pitted against each other in a fictional courtroom setting to decide who was to blame for their break-up. Representing each "ex" was a "counselor" who presented one of the ex's sides of the "case." Jason Winer generally served as the counselor for men while Kara Jane McNamara represented the women. Chris Reed was the judge during the proceedings. Richard "Humpty" Vission was the in-house DJ for the show. The show was marked by the appearance of "surprise witnesses" who would corroborate or refute accusations (usually relating to cheating or not cheating) made by the exes and/or counselors.

The show included a first round titled "Tick Tock Testimony" where each ex was given 90 seconds to tell his or her side of the story. Whenever a point was made, the counselor for the ex currently testifying would press a large button which would stop the clock and allow the other ex to testify. Each side alternated until both were out of time.

The next round was "You Did It, Now Admit It!" where each ex had to give three secrets (usually, incriminating). If the secret was admitted truthfully, the ex was given a point. If they answered incorrectly or chose not to answer (Pleading the Fifth), no points were scored. After three questions, the player with the higher score had a friend come out and explain why the opponent was to blame for the break-up. In case of a tie, both friends came out and explained why the other was to blame.

The third round was the same as the first except that each ex was questioned by the opposing counselor, known as the "Cross-ex" Round.

The fourth and final round sent each contestant into the Karaoke Chamber where he or she would individually sing a predetermined song that each felt summed up the relationship.

At the end of the final round, the studio audience (the "jury of your peers") would vote for whom it felt was at fault for the break-up. The "winner" at the end of the show (the ex voted to be not at fault) received a prize vacation. Afterwards, the "loser" was made to get down on their hands and knees and give 15 seconds to apologize for all the trouble they caused. The winner had two choices: accept the apology and then let him/her "go on their loser way," or reject the apology and use a Polaroid camera with which to take a picture of the "losing" ex (this ended up happening more often) to be added to the "Do Not Date This Blame Game Loser" section of the Blame Game's website. In October 1999, the policy changed, and the loser's picture was posted in a section of the magazine Entertainment Weekly; in March 2000, the picture posting moved back to the Blame Game website for the rest of the shows run. Regardless of the outcome, the winner still got the vacation.
