= Hearst Media Production Group =

American media and production company

Hearst Media Production Group, LLC.
- Formerly: Litton Syndications (1988–2005); Litton Entertainment (2005–2022)
- Type: Subsidiary
- Industry: Television
- Founded: 1988; 38 years ago in Baltimore, Maryland
- Founder: Dave Morgan
- Headquarters: New York City, New York, United States
- Number of locations: 4
- Area served: Worldwide
- Key people: Frank Biancuzzo (president)
- Products: Television programming Educational entertainment
- Services: Distribution; Media sales
- Parent: Hearst Television (2017–present)
- Website: hmpg.com

The Hearst Media Production Group, LLC., formerly Litton Syndications and Litton Entertainment, is an American media production and syndication company based in New York City, New York and a subsidiary of the Hearst Television division of Hearst Communications, with three additional offices in Boston, Washington, D.C. and Burbank, California. Many of HMPG's programs comply with federally mandated educational and informational requirements.

== History ==
=== Early history (1988–2011) ===
The company was founded in 1988 as Litton Syndications (no relation to Litton Industries) by Dave Morgan in Baltimore. Its first syndicated productions were a series of one-off, sports-related specials. The programs were bought from other companies.

In the 1990s, seeing a growing market for educational programs due to the enactment of the Children's Television Act, requiring television stations to air a weekly quota of educational programs, Litton began to syndicate Jack Hanna's Animal Adventures. In 1993, the company was moved to Charleston, South Carolina, while maintaining a production base in Burbank, California. Litton has maintained a long-time business relationship with Columbus Zoo and Aquarium director emeritus Jack Hanna and his family with three more later series throughout the 2000s and 2010s, only ending actively in 2021 with Hanna's retirement after a diagnosis of Alzheimer's. The Hanna family sold their shares of their programming library to Hearst in 2023, and the company has continued to create new series from his archive, re-edited for contemporary young audiences.

In 2005, the company changed its name from Litton Syndications to Litton Entertainment. Adding to its outside syndication library that included Baywatch in May 2007, Litton purchased from PeaceArch Entertainment Group syndication rights to 85 films in the Castle Hill library. The low-budget films were bundled into four groups and was the company's first move into syndicating films. By 2008, Litton Ent. had syndicated rights to three off-MTV shows, Cribs, Pimp My Ride and Date My Mom, while adding that year, Storm Stories from The Weather Channel. In the 2009–10 schedule year, Litton offered the nontraditional court show Street Court.

In January 2011, Litton distributed the urban-oriented newsmagazine, dubbed Direct Access (hosted by former BET personality Darian "Big Tigger" Morgan) from WDCW (Washington, D.C.) to fellow Tribune Broadcasting stations and Weigel Broadcasting's WCIU-TV (Chicago).

=== Involvement in network E/I blocks (2011–17) ===
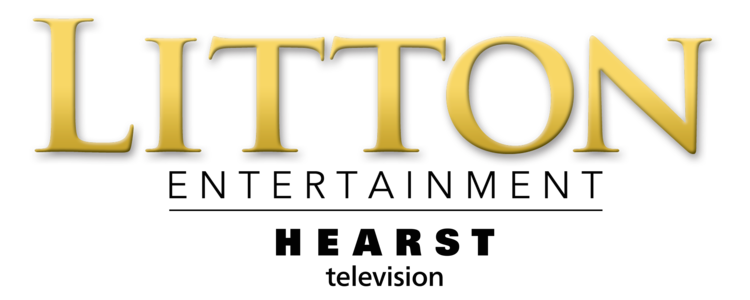
Litton Entertainment logo used from 2014 to 2022. The Hearst Television logo was added in 2017.

In May 2011, following the announcement of plans to discontinue the half-animated ABC Kids Saturday morning block, Litton reached a deal with ABC's affiliate board to syndicate a block of live-action, E/I (educational and informative) compliant programming, known as Litton's Weekend Adventure. The block premiered on September 3, 2011.

On September 28, 2013, Litton introduced its second Saturday morning network television block, CBS Dream Team, for CBS; focusing on teenagers 13 to 16 years old. The block succeeded CBS' previous block, Cookie Jar TV (owned by Canada-based DHX (now as "WildBrain"). Recipe Rehab was one preexisting program Litton moved over from its ABC block.

The company planned to double its productions by adding production facilities in South Carolina. Litton began renting and renovation a North Charleston studio used with its first-ever scripted production, The Inspectors, also being its first series produced there. LE's first film produced in that studio was the independent film The Ivy League Farmer, which began filming in September. Additionally, Litton planned to build its own studio complex with many different stages somewhere in the state. With production of most of Litton's projects should move there also.

In 2014, Ocean Mysteries With Jeff Corwin won two Daytime Creative Arts Emmy Awards for Outstanding Travel Program and Outstanding Directing in a Lifestyle/Culinary/Travel Program. On October 4, 2014, Litton introduced its third Saturday morning block, One Magnificent Morning, for The CW, succeeding Saban Brands' Vortexx block.

For the 2016–17 season, Litton launched two additional E/I programming blocks. On April 27, 2015, Litton announced Go Time, a syndicated block of E/I programming drawn largely from reruns of programming from its other network blocks, which launched on October 1, 2016. On February 24, 2016, Litton and NBC announced The More You Know, which launched on October 8, 2016, succeeding preschool-aimed NBC Kids.

=== Acquisition by Hearst and rebranding as HMPG (2017–present) ===
On January 6, 2017, Hearst Television, a division of Hearst Communications and a former employer of company founder Dave Morgan, announced that it had acquired a majority stake in Litton for an undisclosed amount, a deal closed on February 1, 2017. On January 25, 2017, Litton and Tribune Media announced a deal for the 2017–18 season where they will provide E/I content for Tribune's Antenna TV network. In the 2017–18 season, NBC's The More You Know block also began to be carried on NBC's classic television subchannel network, Cozi TV. On January 6, 2018, Telemundo's block, MiTelemundo, was relaunched to carry programs from NBC's The More You Know block, in Spanish. The block, however, kept its original name.

On September 7, 2021, after fully acquiring Litton's balance that year, Hearst Television announced that the former would be moved under a new unified banner for the latter's outside productions, including Matter of Fact with Soledad O'Brien. The combined unit was officially renamed Hearst Media Production Group on January 28, 2022.

On March 3, 2022, HMPG made an agreement with Toonz Media Group in which the former will co-produce animated productions with the latter, including Paddypaws, Sunnyside Billy, Kingdom of None and Aliens in My Backpack, and distribute them in the United States.

== Former divisions ==
Litton formerly had three operating divisions:

- Litton Worldwide Distribution
- Litton Media Sales
- Litton News Source provides stations with reports and features from Consumer Reports magazine, Consumer Reports TV and Consumer Alert News Network (Hearst itself had previously partnered with Consumer Reports in the 1990s and 2000s for national wire stories). Previous programming included Brighter Living With Jill Cordes, BusinessWeek Reports From Wall Street, Standard & Poor's Customized Reports, Consumer Reports "Good Housekeeping Reports" and seasonal specials, "Solutions With Jill", "BusinessWeek Custom Wall Street Reports", "S&P Custom Market Indices"

== First run syndicated ==
=== Programming blocks ===
Programming block	Network	Launch	Replaced	Former programmer
Weekend Adventure	ABC	September 3, 2011	ABC Kids	The Walt Disney Company
CBS WKND	CBS	September 28, 2013	Cookie Jar TV	DHX Media (now WilidBrain)
One Magnificent Morning	The CW; The CW Plus	October 4, 2014	Vortexx	Saban Brands
Go Time	Syndication	October 1, 2016	–	–
The More You Know; MiTelemundo	NBC; Cozi TV; Telemundo	October 8, 2016	NBC Kids; MiTelemundo	NBCUniversal

=== Stand alone programs ===
- Jack Hanna's Animal Adventures (1993–2008), half-hour nature show; continued in reruns until 2020 and segments re-edited into new series after 2020
- The Wildlife Docs (2013–18), half-hour non-domestic animal vet show
- Animal Exploration with Jarod Miller (2007–10), half-hour nature show
- NASCAR Angels, inspirational automotive rehabilitation reality show co-produced with NASCAR
- BusinessWeek TV, half-hour financial news, discontinued with purchase of magazine by Bloomberg L.P.
- Home Team, inspirational time-compressed home improvement project reality show
- Ask Rita, a comedy-based talk show strip hosted by comedian Rita Rudner
- Storm Stories, syndicated distribution of Weather Channel weather event series
- Ready, Set, Pet, hosted by Phil Torres
