= Justice with Judge Mablean =

American court show

- Genre: Nontraditional/dramatized court show
- Presented by: Judge Mablean Ephriam
- Narrated by: Curt Chaplin
- Country of origin: United States
- No. of seasons: 12
- No. of episodes: 800+

Production
- Production location: Culver City, California
- Camera setup: Multiple
- Running time: 30 minutes
- Production company: Allen Media Group

Original release
- Network: Syndication
- Release: September 15, 2014 – present

Justice with Judge Mablean is an American nontraditional/dramatized court show presided by Judge Mablean Ephriam, a former Los Angeles prosecuting attorney. Ephriam previously presided on Divorce Court, from July 1999 until March 2006. The show often features everyday small-claims disputes, neighbors suing over property damage, friends fighting over unpaid trips or loans, and family disagreements.

== Production ==
In November 2013, it was reported that Allen Media Group had signed Ephriam to preside a new courtroom series, Justice with Judge Mablean; the show premiered in syndication on September 15, 2014.

On May 5, 2025, Justice with Judge Mablean was renewed for two more seasons, taking the show through the 2026–27 television season (the shows' thirteenth season).
