= Judge Faith =

American reality court show (2014–2017)

- Genre: Arbitration-based reality court show
- Starring: Faith Jenkins (judge); Barbara Bonner Carlisle (season 1 bailiff); Juan Bustamante (seasons 2-3 bailiff)
- Narrated by: Brooks Moore (season 1); Scott Taylor (seasons 2-3)
- Theme music composer: Scott Szabo
- Country of origin: United States
- Original language: English
- No. of seasons: 3

Production
- Camera setup: Multi-camera
- Running time: 20 minutes
- Production company: Trifecta Entertainment & Media The Tornante Company

Original release
- Network: Syndication
- Release: September 22, 2014 – May 26, 2017

Judge Faith is an American syndicated arbitration-based reality court show presided over by former Manhattan Assistant District Attorney Faith Jenkins. The show premiered on September 22, 2014 and ran for 3 seasons until May 26, 2017.

Judge Faith is produced by The Tornante Company and Trifecta Entertainment. Trifecta also handles all distribution and ad sales for the show.

The court show ended production in 2017 and was cancelled in 2018 with reruns continuing until early September 2018. Jenkins and Bustamante took over judge and bailiff duties for Divorce Court two years after Judge Faith ended its run from 2020 to 2022.
