= Power of Attorney (TV series) =

American court show

Power of Attorney is an American syndicated nontraditional court show that differed from other judge shows in that each side was represented by famous attorneys who cross-examined witnesses. It was produced by 20th Century Fox Television.

== Cast ==
The pool of attorneys who made appearances on the program included:

- Johnnie Cochran, defense attorney in the O. J. Simpson murder trial
- Marcia Clark, prosecutor in the Simpson trial
- Christopher Darden, prosecutor in the Simpson trial
- Geoffrey Fieger, defense attorney for Jack Kevorkian
- Wendy Murphy, former sex crimes prosecutor, attorney and television personality
- Gloria Allred, attorney and television personality
- Keith Fink, attorney for Courtney Love
- Dominic Barbara, attorney for Joey Buttafuoco
- Benedict Morelli
- Ted Williams

The show's judge was Andrew Napolitano during the first season, 2000–2001, and in the second season, 20th Television's Judge Lynn Toler (later of Divorce Court) was the presiding judge. Joseph J. Catalano II (son of Divorce Court former bailiff Joseph J. Catalano Sr) was the court show's bailiff and Andy Geller was the court show's announcer.

== Broadcast history ==
The show was cancelled mid-way through the second season due to low ratings, the effects of preemptions at the start of the second season due to the September 11 attacks breaking the momentum of Judge Lynn's debut, and the high cost of the 10 or so rotating high-profile attorneys.
