= Justice for All with Judge Cristina Perez =

American court show

- Genre: Nontraditional/dramatized court show
- Created by: Byron Allen
- Starring: Cristina Perez; Renard Spivey (2012–2020); Cinder Eller-Kimbell (2021–present)
- Theme music composer: Brian Wayy
- Country of origin: United States
- Original languages: English; Spanish
- No. of seasons: 13
- No. of episodes: 927

Production
- Executive producers: Byron Allen; Carolyn Folks
- Running time: 22 minutes
- Production company: Entertainment Studios

Original release
- Network: First-run syndication
- Release: September 17, 2012 – present

Justice for All with Judge Cristina Perez is an American nontraditional/dramatized court show that debuted in first-run syndication on September 17, 2012. The series, which is created by Byron Allen through his production company, Entertainment Studios, is presided by lawyer and award-winning TV judge Cristina Perez. Perez returned to American television following a three-year stint on the three-time Daytime Emmy Award winning, 20th Television-distributed court show, Cristina's Court (2006–09), cancelled due to low ratings. Justice for All with Judge Cristina Perez is unique in that it's the first court show and one of few television series to simultaneously produce English and Spanish-language versions.

Like Entertainment Studios's two other courtroom programs, America's Court with Judge Ross and We the People, Justice for All is a staged court show. At the end of the program, a standard disclaimer is shown which states that "All characters displayed are fictional and any resemblance to actual persons is coincidental." As of the first half of the 2012-13 television season, the three court shows presently produced by Entertainment Studios have been the lowest rated in the court show genre.

== Production and distribution ==
In March 2012, Entertainment Studios sold the program to stations covering approximately 85% of all U.S. markets, including those owned by CBS Television Stations, Weigel Broadcasting, Sinclair Broadcast Group, Media General, Gray Television, LIN Media, Nexstar Media Group and Meredith Corporation. On July 22, 2013, Entertainment Studios renewed the series for its second and third seasons.

In 2019, bailiff Renard Spivey was arrested in Houston, Texas, where he served as a deputy with the Harris County Sheriff's Office, for allegedly killing his wife. He was replaced by Cinder Eller-Kimbell when production resumed in 2021.

In September 2020, Entertainment Studios announced that the series was renewed for seven more seasons, which will take the show through its fifteenth season.

== Cast ==
=== Main ===
- Cristina Perez as herself (Judge)
- Renard Spivey as himself (Bailiff) (2012–2020)
- Cinder Eller-Kimbell as herself (Bailiff) (2021–present)

=== Guest stars ===
- Mary Cruz as Kelly
- Dyanne Klinko as Tara Stewart (Defendant)
- Brashaad Mayweather as DJ Sapphire / DJ
- Jason Shoemaker as Larry Mondello
- Holly Haith as Brittney / Ashley Smith
- Tyrone Evans Clark as Andrew Sinclair
- Michael Klaumann as Anthony Moore
- Brent Duffey as Dylan / Chris
- Daniel Glass as Anthony Franklin
