= Woodhill, Lexington =

Woodhill
- Neighborhood of Lexington, Kentucky
- Interactive map of Woodhill
- Coordinates: 38.015°N 84.449°W
- Country: United States
- State: Kentucky
- County: Fayette
- City: Lexington

Area
  - Total: 1.46 sq mi (3.8 km^{2})
  - Water: 0 sq mi (0.0 km^{2})

Population (2000)
  - Total: 5,684
  - Density: 3,893/sq mi (1,503/km^{2})
- Time zone: UTC-5 (Eastern (EST))
  - Summer (DST): UTC-4 (EDT)
- ZIP code: 40509
- Area code: 859

Woodhill is a neighborhood in southeast Lexington, Kentucky, United States. Its boundaries are Richmond Road to the west, New Circle Road to the north, Palumbo Drive to the east, and Man o' War Boulevard to the south.

== Neighborhood statistics ==
- Population: 5,684
- Land area: 1.46 square miles (3.8 km^{2})
- Population density: 3,893 persons per sq mile
- Median household income: $30,212
