= Guilty or Not Guilty =

Canadian TV series

- Genre: Panel game show
- Presented by: Duncan Crux
- Country of origin: Canada
- Original language: English
- No. of seasons: 1

Production
- Producer: J. Stot

Original release
- Network: CBC Television
- Release: 5 October 1958 – 31 January 1959

Guilty or Not Guilty is a Canadian panel quiz show that aired on CBC Television from 1958 to 1959.

== Premise ==
Duncan Crux, a lawyer, hosted this Vancouver-produced series. Actual legal cases were presented in a trial format to a panel which resembled a jury. After the panel delivered their verdict, the case's real-life verdict was revealed.

== Scheduling ==
This half-hour series was broadcast on Sundays at 1:00 p.m. (Eastern) from 5 October 1958 to 31 January 1959.
