= Curtis Court =

American reality court show (2000–2001)

- Genre: Arbitration-based reality court show
- Starring: James Curtis
- Country of origin: United States
- Original language: English

Production
- Running time: 30 minutes
- Production company: King World

Original release
- Network: Syndicated
- Release: September 11, 2000 – June 15, 2001

Curtis Court is an American arbitration-based reality court show, hosted by James Curtis. It aired for one season, the 2000-01 television season. The show was produced and distributed by King World (now CBS Television Distribution).
