= Unintentional defamation =

Tort law concept

Unintentional defamation occurs where a work of fiction contains a character that coincidentally shares a name or other recognizable characteristics with a real person, such that the real person is defamed by the depiction.

A famous early case in the field, E. Hutton & Co. v. Jones (1910), was successfully brought by a person named Artemus Jones who sued a newspaper that had published a story about a fictional Artemus Jones.

In order to minimize the risk of unintentional defamation, producers of film, television, and radio programs will engage in a process of negative checking to ensure that the names of fictional characters cannot be confused with real life people, and will post a fictitious persons disclaimer stating that the characters portrayed in it are fictional, and not based on real persons.

== Negative checking ==
Negative checking is a process by which producers of film, television and radio programs will attempt to ensure that the names of fictional characters cannot be confused with real life people. For instance, during the making of the television series Inspector Morse, the producers of the show checked with local police to ensure that the names of characters used in the program could not be confused with individuals in any real life cases. The primary reason for this practice is to prevent any possible legal action for libel which could result. The term is sometimes shortened in program credits to Neg Check.

== Fictitious persons disclaimer ==
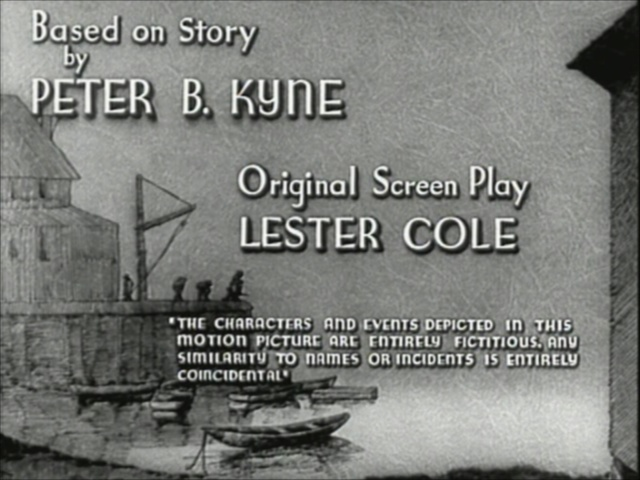
A title card from the film Affairs of Cappy Ricks (1937) showing an all persons fictitious disclaimer

A fictitious persons disclaimer in a work of media states that the characters portrayed in it are fictional, and not based on real persons. This is done mostly in realistic films and television programs to reduce the possibility of legal action for libel from any person who believes that they have been defamed by their portrayal in the work, whether portrayed under their real name or a different name. The wording of this disclaimer varies, and differs from jurisdiction to jurisdiction, as does its legal effectiveness.

=== History ===
The disclaimer came as a result of litigation against the 1932 Metro-Goldwyn-Mayer (MGM) film Rasputin and the Empress, which depicted the character Princess Natasha being seduced by Russian mystic Rasputin. Natasha was claimed to represent Princess Irina Alexandrovna of Russia, who sued MGM for libel. After seeing the film twice and hearing testimony, the English Court of Appeal agreed that the princess had been defamed. In 1934, Irina and her husband Felix Yusupov were reportedly awarded $127,373 (equivalent to $3,070,000 in 2025) in damages, and $1,000,000 (equivalent to $24,000,000 in 2025) in an out-of-court settlement with MGM. As a preventive measure against further lawsuits, the film was taken out of distribution for decades.

The film began with a claim that "This concerns the destruction of an empire ... A few of the characters are still alive—the rest met death by violence." Reportedly, a justice in the case told MGM that not only was this claim damaging to their case, but that their case would be stronger if they had incorporated a directly opposite statement, that the film was not intended as an accurate portrayal of real people or events. This prompted the film industry to add the disclaimer to all future movies for decades, even when it was clearly untrue.

Despite the disclaimer's widespread use, its actual effectiveness is unclear. In the United States, fictional works are already heavily protected under the First Amendment, and success of libel suits is rare, with a high burden of proof. Meanwhile, films using the disclaimer have still been successfully sued for defamation. Robert B. Kelly was awarded damages in 1948 for a negative depiction in the World War II movie They Were Expendable. An additional example was the 1980 film The Idolmaker, based on a fictional talent promoter who discovers a talentless teenage boy and turns him into a manufactured star. Singer Fabian, whose career path was similar to the fictional singer depicted in the film, took offense at the caricature, and the production company responded by bringing up the all persons fictitious disclaimer. Because Bob Marcucci, the promoter on which the fictional character was based, was part of the production staff (and thus it could not be plausibly denied that actual events inspired the film), Fabian received a settlement granting a minority stake in the film's profits.

=== Examples ===
Although the disclaimer is routinely included as a boilerplate, producers sometimes vary from it, sometimes to make a statement about the veracity of their work, for humor, or to satirize the standard disclaimer.

The disclaimer is sometimes presented with qualifications.

- In Jack Webb's police series Dragnet, each episode begins with an announcer intoning, "The story you are about to see is true. The names have been changed to protect the innocent." In parody, Square One Television's Mathnet segments (an affectionate send-up of Dragnet) begin each episode with the statement "The story you are about to see is a fib, but it's short. The names are made up, but the problems are real."
- The 1969 Western film Butch Cassidy and the Sundance Kid, based upon real individuals whose lives and exploits already had a place among American legends of the West, opens with the disclaimer "Most of what follows is true."
- Because of the autobiographical nature of Dave Eggers' memoir, A Heartbreaking Work of Staggering Genius, the book features the following play on the usual disclaimer: "Any resemblance to persons living or dead should be plainly apparent to them and those who know them, especially if the author has been kind enough to have provided their real names and, in some cases, their phone numbers. All events described herein actually happened, though on occasion the author has taken certain, very small, liberties with chronology, because that is his right as an American."
- South Park, which frequently features well-known public figures or parodies of them, always opens with a disclaimer that begins by stating, "All characters and events in this show—even those based on real people—are entirely fictional. All celebrity voices are impersonated... poorly. The following program contains coarse language and due to its content it should not be viewed by anyone."
- The Adult Swim stop-motion animation series Robot Chicken begins each episode with the disclaimer "Any actual names or likenesses of celebrities are used in a fictitious and parodic manner."

Disclaimers can occasionally be used to make political or similar points. One such disclaimer is shown at the end of the industrial/political thriller The Constant Gardener, signed by the author of the original book, John le Carré: "Nobody in this story, and no outfit or corporation, thank God, is based upon an actual person or outfit in the real world. But I can tell you this; as my journey through the pharmaceutical jungle progressed, I came to realize that, by comparison with the reality, my story was as tame as a holiday postcard." Other examples of such variation include:

- The 1941 film Hellzapoppin' displays a comic variant of the disclaimer during the opening titles: "...any similarity between HELLZAPOPPIN' and a motion picture is purely coincidental."
- The 1943 film I Walked with a Zombie displays the following disclaimer during its opening titles: "Any similarity to any persons, living, dead, OR POSSESSED, is entirely coincidental."
- The 1963 film Hands over the City, which was originally planned as a documentary but adapted into a narrative film instead in order to avoid Italian censors, ends with the notice: "The characters and facts narrated here are fictional, but the social and environmental reality that produces them is real."
- The 1969 film Z, which is based on the military dictatorship ruling Greece at that time, has this notice: "Any resemblance to actual events, to persons living or dead, is not the result of chance. It is DELIBERATE."
- German Nobel Prize laureate Heinrich Böll's novel The Lost Honour of Katharina Blum was originally preceded by a statement which made the usual disclaimer, but stated that similarities to the journalistic practices of the German newspaper Bild "are neither intended nor coincidental but inevitable"; this disclaimer was later removed in the English edition.

The familiar disclaimer is often rewritten for humor. Early examples include The Three Stooges' parody of Nazi Germany You Nazty Spy, which stated that "Any resemblance between the characters in this picture and any persons, living or dead, is a miracle", and its sequel I'll Never Heil Again, which features a disclaimer that states that "The characters in this picture are fictitious. Anyone resembling them is better off dead." Other examples include:

- In the 1966 film Thunderbirds Are Go, set in the year 2068, a disclaimer states: "None of the characters appearing in this photoplay intentionally resemble any persons living or dead... SINCE THEY DO NOT YET EXIST".
- In the 1981 film An American Werewolf in London, and in the 1983 music video Michael Jackson's Thriller, the disclaimer refers to "persons living, dead or undead".
- Debbie Does Dallas, a 1978 pornographic film, does not use the disclaimer in print, but Bambi Woods, in the film's trailer, insists the film is "completely fictional" while at the same time surmising that the events in the film "could have really happened".

Variations sometimes employ irony or satire. The 1985 film The Return of the Living Dead features a disclaimer that reads "The events portrayed in this film are all true. The names are real names of real people and real organizations." The novel Breakfast of Champions by Kurt Vonnegut features a truncated version of the disclaimer: "All persons, living and dead, are purely coincidental, and should not be construed", referring to the novel's existentialist themes. The 1990 film Slacker ends with "This story was based on fact. Any similarity with fictitious events or characters was purely coincidental." As the 1975 film Monty Python and the Holy Grail possesses no ending credits, the disclaimer, supposedly signed by Richard Nixon, is thus instead featured in the opening credits.

In response to controversies over cultural appropriation and the use of an indigenous term, Filipino television network ABS-CBN used a special disclaimer in the 2018 fantaserye Bagani, maintaining that the series takes place in an alternate fantasy universe inspired by, but unrelated to, pre-colonial Philippines and is in no way intended to trivialize or misrepresent tribal groups: "Ang kuwentong inyong mapapanood ay kathang-isip lamang at kumuha ng inspirasyon mula sa iba’t ibang alamat at mitolohiyang Pilipino. Ito’y hindi tumutukoy o kumakatawan sa kahit anong Indigenous People sa Pilipinas." ("The story you are about to watch is a work of fiction and merely takes inspiration from various Philippine legends and mythologies. It does not pertain to nor does it represent any Indigenous People in the Philippines.")

== See also ==
- Roman à clef
