= America's Court with Judge Ross =

American syndicated court show

- Genre: Nontraditional/dramatized court show
- Created by: Byron Allen
- Judges: Kevin A. Ross
- Narrated by: John Cramer
- Theme music composer: Transition Music
- Country of origin: United States
- Original language: English
- No. of seasons: 17

Production
- Executive producers: Byron Allen; Carolyn Folks; Jennifer Lucas; Kevin A. Ross; Patricia Wilson
- Camera setup: Multi-cam
- Running time: 22 minutes
- Production company: Entertainment Studios

Original release
- Network: First-run syndication
- Release: September 20, 2010 – present

America's Court with Judge Ross is an American syndicated court show produced by Allen Media Group (AMG). The program features former Los Angeles County Superior Court Judge Kevin A. Ross presiding over nontraditional/dramatized small claims court cases. Retired Los Angeles County Sheriff's Department Captain Bruce Thomas serves as the show's bailiff. Nominated for a Daytime Emmy Award in 2012 and 2025 for Outstanding Legal/Courtroom Program, the series currently films in Culver City, California.

== Production ==
On October 14, 2009, it was announced that America's Court would launch on broadcast stations. It subsequently debuted September 20, 2010, and is the only daytime program remaining from the 2010–11 season of freshman syndicated shows. On February 26, 2014, America's Court was renewed through the 2015–16 season. On September 14, 2020, the series received a seven-year commitment.

By the 2025–26 television season, America's Court had made it to its 16th season. This makes Kevin Ross the second longest-serving, consecutive African American and Black court show arbitrator after Judge Greg Mathis, whose Judge Mathis series ran for 24 uninterrupted seasons.

America's Court is also the longest running court show with the same judge of all the legal genre shows currently in production.

Confirmed for renewal for two additional years on May 5, 2025, Season 17 of America's Court began September 14, 2026.

== Justice Central/other platforms ==
As with the other eight AMG law programs modeling its format, America's Court with Judge Ross can be seen on the company's related Justice Central cable network. The show is also available on TheGrio television network, YouTube and various streaming platforms.
