= List of programs broadcast by Qubo =

This is a list of programs formerly broadcast by the now-defunct children's television channel Qubo in the United States, a children's network which existed from January 8, 2007, until February 28, 2021.

Also detailed are Qubo-branded children's programming blocks which were carried by Ion Television and its subnetwork Ion Life/Ion Plus, NBC, and Telemundo. The Qubo blocks ended on the Ion networks on February 26, 2021, and on NBC and Telemundo on July 1, 2012.

== Qubo Channel ==
=== Former programming ===
==== Original programming ====
Title	Premiere date	End date	Source(s)
My Friend Rabbit	October 4, 2007	July 25, 2020	
Turbo Dogs	October 5, 2008	September 27, 2015	
Shelldon	October 16, 2009	September 30, 2012	

==== Acquired programming ====
===== NBCUniversal =====
Title	Premiere date	End date	Source(s)
Boo!	January 8, 2007	June 29, 2012	
Sitting Ducks	January 8, 2007	June 30, 2012	
3-2-1 Penguins!	January 14, 2007	August 31, 2014	
LarryBoy: The Cartoon Adventures	January 14, 2007	September 13, 2009	
VeggieTales	January 14, 2007	September 13, 2009	
Postman Pat	October 6, 2007	September 24, 2010	
Maisy	November 3, 2008	June 29, 2012	
BraveStarr	September 27, 2010	August 25, 2013	
He-Man and the Masters of the Universe	September 27, 2010	August 25, 2013	
She-Ra: Princess of Power	September 27, 2010	August 25, 2013	
Ghostbusters	September 28, 2010	August 26, 2013	
Guess with Jess	May 13, 2013	December 25, 2016	

===== Corus Entertainment =====
Title	Premiere date	End date	Source(s)
Pecola	January 8, 2007	July 26, 2020	
Rupert	January 8, 2007	July 25, 2020	
Babar	January 14, 2007	February 23, 2021	
Jane and the Dragon	January 14, 2007	February 26, 2021	
Jacob Two-Two	January 14, 2007	December 30, 2017	
Being Ian	September 19, 2009	January 1, 2021	
Class of the Titans	September 19, 2009	July 25, 2020	
Pearlie	September 19, 2009	July 26, 2020	
Spliced	September 19, 2009	March 31, 2012	
Willa's Wild Life	October 26, 2009	October 25, 2020	
Pippi Longstocking	October 26, 2009	July 26, 2020	
Rescue Heroes	October 26, 2009	February 27, 2021	
George and Martha	March 28, 2016	December 30, 2018	
Grossology	March 28, 2016	July 25, 2020	
Ned's Newt	March 28, 2016	July 24, 2020	
Stickin' Around	March 28, 2016	July 24, 2020	
Scaredy Squirrel	March 27, 2017	July 24, 2020	
Sidekick	March 27, 2017	July 25, 2020	
Maggie and the Ferocious Beast	May 28, 2018	February 27, 2021	
Mike the Knight	December 30, 2019	December 4, 2020	
Babar and the Adventures of Badou	December 30, 2019	February 27, 2021	
Super BOOMi	December 7, 2020	February 26, 2021	
Franklin	January 1, 2021	February 26, 2021	

===== Scholastic Entertainment =====
Title	Premiere date	End date	Source(s)
Dragon	January 14, 2007	September 25, 2015	
Sammy's Story Shop	November 3, 2008	September 27, 2015	
Animorphs	May 18, 2013	September 27, 2015	
Dear America	May 18, 2013	September 27, 2015	
I Spy	May 18, 2013	September 25, 2015	
The Royal Diaries	May 18, 2013	September 27, 2015	

===== 9 Story Media Group =====
Title	Premiere date	End date	Source(s)
Timeblazers	February 18, 2012	December 30, 2017	
Artzooka!	June 30, 2012	March 25, 2018	
Harry and His Bucket Full of Dinosaurs	June 30, 2012	December 25, 2020	
Joe & Jack	January 3, 2015	February 28, 2021	
Wibbly Pig	January 1, 2018	February 26, 2021	
Look Kool	January 6, 2018	February 28, 2021	
Monkey See, Monkey Do	March 26, 2018	December 4, 2020	
Bubu and the Little Owls	December 31, 2018	February 26, 2021	
Finding Stuff Out	September 30, 2019	February 21, 2021	
Vivi	January 4, 2020	December 25, 2020	
The Magic School Bus Rides Again	November 1, 2020	February 28, 2021	
Science Max	December 6, 2020	February 28, 2021	

===== WildBrain =====
Title	Premiere date	End date	Source(s)
Where on Earth Is Carmen Sandiego?	June 9, 2012	May 26, 2018	
Archie's Weird Mysteries	May 13, 2013	May 26, 2018	
Sherlock Holmes in the 22nd Century	May 13, 2013	May 25, 2018	
Monster Math Squad	October 1, 2018	February 26, 2021	
Madeline	October 6, 2018	February 22, 2021	
The Adventures of Paddington Bear	October 7, 2018	February 25, 2021	
Pirates: Adventures in Art	January 6, 2019	December 25, 2020	
Inspector Gadget	August 31, 2019	February 28, 2021	
Fireman Sam	September 30, 2019	February 26, 2021	
Rainbow Ruby	September 30, 2019	January 29, 2021	
Jerry and the Raiders	October 5, 2019	February 26, 2021	
Kate & Mim-Mim	December 7, 2020	February 26, 2021	
You & Me	December 7, 2020	February 26, 2021	

===== Splash Entertainment =====
Title	Premiere date	End date	Source(s)
Dive, Olly, Dive!	April 7, 2014	February 28, 2021	
Pet Alien	June 26, 2017	February 27, 2021	
Cosmic Quantum Ray	July 30, 2018	February 26, 2021	
The DaVincibles	July 30, 2018	February 26, 2021	

===== Bellum Entertainment Group =====
Title	Premiere date	End date	Source(s)
Animal Atlas	June 9, 2012	July 28, 2018	
Zoo Clues	December 26, 2016	August 25, 2019	
Safari Tracks	March 27, 2017	August 26, 2019	

===== Other companies =====
Title	Premiere date	End date	Source(s)
Miss BG	December 3, 2007	August 25, 2013	
Gofrette	November 3, 2008	September 24, 2017	
Animal Exploration with Jarod Miller	July 3, 2010	December 28, 2014	
Mighty Machines	July 3, 2010	August 31, 2014	
The Mysteries of Alfred Hedgehog	September 27, 2010	September 25, 2016	
Dex Hamilton: Alien Entomologist	February 18, 2012	December 27, 2014	
Taste Buds	June 30, 2012	May 24, 2014	
Eliot Kid	May 13, 2013	December 25, 2016	
Sandra, the Fairytale Detective	May 13, 2013	October 1, 2018	
Culture Click	May 18, 2013	December 27, 2015	
Funniest Pets & People	March 1, 2014	February 27, 2021	
Famous 5: On the Case	March 3, 2014	November 25, 2017	
Sally Bollywood: Super Detective	March 3, 2014	November 25, 2017	
Mickey's Farm	December 6, 2014	July 24, 2020	
The Choo Choo Bob Show	December 29, 2014	March 29, 2020	
Denver, the Last Dinosaur	December 29, 2014	December 24, 2018	
This Is Daniel Cook.	March 30, 2015	December 28, 2018	
Nutri Ventures	April 25, 2016	January 5, 2019	
Secret Millionaires' Club	December 26, 2016	February 26, 2021	
Xploration Animal Science	December 26, 2016	September 30, 2018	
Giver	June 26, 2017	December 27, 2020	
Chirp	September 25, 2017	January 29, 2021	
Stella and Sam	April 1, 2018	February 27, 2021	
Messy Goes to Okido	December 7, 2020	February 26, 2021	
Justin Time	January 4, 2021	February 26, 2021	

==== Programming from Nick Jr. ====
Title	Premiere date	End date	Source(s)
The Busy World of Richard Scarry	May 13, 2013	May 26, 2018	
Miss Spider's Sunny Patch Friends	October 1, 2018	February 26, 2021	

==== Programming from Discovery Kids ====
Title	Premiere date	End date	Source(s)
ToddWorld	April 7, 2014	February 26, 2021	
Doki	September 1, 2014	February 26, 2021	
Fishtronaut	March 30, 2015	December 25, 2020	
Meteor and the Mighty Monster Trucks	March 30, 2015	December 31, 2017	

==== Programming from PBS Kids ====
Title	Premiere date	End date	Source(s)
Theodore Tugboat	January 8, 2007	September 13, 2009	
Elliot Moose	January 8, 2007	September 24, 2010	
Lamb Chop's Play-Along	January 8, 2007	September 13, 2009	
Marvin the Tap-Dancing Horse	January 8, 2007	July 24, 2020	
The Zula Patrol	July 4, 2008	September 29, 2018	
Adventures from the Book of Virtues	November 3, 2008	September 24, 2017	
The Magic School Bus	September 27, 2010	February 10, 2012	
Jakers! The Adventures of Piggley Winks	June 30, 2012	February 26, 2021	
Anne of Green Gables: The Animated Series	May 13, 2013	December 25, 2016	
Timothy Goes to School	May 13, 2013	July 24, 2020	
Raggs	September 1, 2014	July 27, 2018	
Thomas Edison's Secret Lab	December 26, 2016	February 26, 2021	
Bob the Builder (2015)	August 26, 2019	February 27, 2021	
Bob the Builder (1999)	October 7, 2020	February 24, 2021	
Jay Jay the Jet Plane	February 1, 2021	February 26, 2021	

==== Interstitial programming ====
Title	Premiere date	End date	Source(s)
Ask Me!	January 8, 2007	January 31, 2021	
The Zimmer Twins	November 3, 2008	2010	
Vitaminix	November 3, 2008	February 22, 2011	
Animal Bites	July 3, 2010	November 5, 2014	
Wibbly Pig shorts	July 29, 2019	February 28, 2021	
Zerby Derby shorts	July 29, 2019	February 28, 2021	
Ruby's Studio	July 29, 2019	February 28, 2021	
I'm an Animal	July 29, 2019	February 28, 2021	
BatteryPOP	August 12, 2019	February 28, 2021	

==== Blocks ====
Titles	Launch date	End date	Source(s)
Qubo Night Owl	September 28, 2010	January 7, 2019	
K12 Learning Block	2013	March 24, 2017	

=== Scrapped programming ===
==== Acquired programming ====
===== Cookie Jar/WildBrain library =====
Title	Planned premiere date	Source(s)
Busytown Mysteries	Fall 2007	
Liberty's Kids	2013	

== Qubo-branded blocks ==
=== NBC ===
==== Original programming ====
Title	Premiere date	End date	Source(s)
My Friend Rabbit	October 6, 2007	December 26, 2009	
Turbo Dogs	October 4, 2008	December 31, 2011	
Shelldon	October 17, 2009	June 30, 2012	

==== Acquired programming ====
Title	Premiere date	End date	Source(s)
VeggieTales	September 9, 2006	September 12, 2009	
Dragon	September 9, 2006	June 28, 2008	
3-2-1 Penguins!	September 9, 2006	September 12, 2009	
3-2-1 Penguins!	January 2, 2010	October 2, 2010	
LarryBoy: The Cartoon Adventures	September 9, 2006	September 29, 2007	
Babar	September 9, 2006	September 29, 2007	
Babar	July 5, 2008	June 30, 2012	
Jane and the Dragon	September 9, 2006	September 27, 2008	
Jane and the Dragon	September 19, 2009	October 2, 2010	
Jane and the Dragon	January 7, 2012	June 30, 2012	
Jacob Two-Two	September 9, 2006	September 29, 2007	
Jacob Two-Two	September 19, 2009	October 10, 2009	
Postman Pat	October 6, 2007	June 28, 2008	
The Zula Patrol	July 5, 2008	December 26, 2009	
The Zula Patrol	January 7, 2012	June 30, 2012	
Willa's Wild Life	September 19, 2009	June 30, 2012	
The Magic School Bus	October 9, 2010	December 31, 2011	
Pearlie	October 9, 2010	June 30, 2012	

==== Short-form programming ====
Title	Premiere date	End date	Source(s)
Ask Me!	September 9, 2006	June 30, 2012	
The Zimmer Twins	2007	2010	
Vitaminix	November 3, 2008	February 22, 2011	

=== Telemundo ===
==== Original programming ====
- All programming utilized the Spanish-language dub.

Title	Premiere date	End date	Source(s)
My Friend Rabbit	October 6, 2007	2009	
Turbo Dogs	October 4, 2008	December 2011	
Shelldon	October 17, 2009	July 1, 2012	

==== Acquired programming ====
Title	Premiere date	End date	Source(s)
VeggieTales	September 9, 2006	September 13, 2009	
Dragon	September 9, 2006	June 2008	
3-2-1 Penguins!	September 9, 2006	September 13, 2009	
3-2-1 Penguins!	January 2, 2010	October 2, 2010	
LarryBoy: The Cartoon Adventures	September 9, 2006	September 29, 2007	
Babar	September 10, 2006	September 30, 2007	
Babar	July 5, 2008	June 30, 2012	
Jane and the Dragon	September 10, 2006	September 27, 2008	
Jane and the Dragon	September 19, 2009	October 3, 2010	
Jane and the Dragon	January 7, 2012	June 30, 2012	
Jacob Two-Two	September 10, 2006	September 30, 2007	
Jacob Two-Two	September 19, 2009	October 2009	
Postman Pat	October 2007	June 2008	
The Zula Patrol	July 6, 2008	October 2009	
The Zula Patrol	January 7, 2012	June 30, 2012	
Willa's Wild Life	September 20, 2009	July 1, 2012	
The Magic School Bus	October 9, 2010	December 2011	
Pearlie	October 10, 2010	July 1, 2012	

==== Short-form programming ====
Title	Premiere date	End date	Source(s)
Ask Me!	September 9, 2006	June 30, 2012	
The Zimmer Twins	2007	2010	
Vitaminix	November 3, 2008	February 22, 2011	

=== Ion Television ===
==== Original programming ====
Title	Premiere date	End date	Source(s)
My Friend Rabbit	October 12, 2007	September 9, 2009	
My Friend Rabbit	January 3, 2014	December 26, 2014	
Turbo Dogs	October 3, 2008	December 2011	
Shelldon	October 16, 2009	August 31, 2012	

==== Acquired programming ====
Title	Premiere date	End date	Source(s)
VeggieTales	September 15, 2006	September 4, 2009	
Dragon	September 15, 2006	June 27, 2008	
Dragon	October 3, 2014	December 26, 2014	
3-2-1 Penguins!	September 15, 2006	September 3, 2009	
3-2-1 Penguins!	December 31, 2009	September 16, 2010	
LarryBoy: The Cartoon Adventures	September 15, 2006	October 5, 2007	
Babar	September 15, 2006	October 5, 2007	
Babar	July 4, 2008	December 26, 2014	
Jane and the Dragon	September 15, 2006	September 26, 2008	
Jane and the Dragon	September 9, 2009	September 15, 2010	
Jane and the Dragon	January 5, 2012	December 27, 2013	
Jacob Two-Two	September 15, 2006	October 5, 2007	
Jacob Two-Two	September 11, 2009	October 9, 2009	
Jacob Two-Two	September 7, 2012	December 27, 2013	
Postman Pat	October 12, 2007	June 27, 2008	
The Zula Patrol	July 4, 2008	September 10, 2009	
The Zula Patrol	January 4, 2012	September 26, 2014	
Willa's Wild Life	September 17, 2009	December 27, 2013	
Pearlie	October 6, 2010	December 27, 2013	
The Magic School Bus	October 7, 2010	December 2011	
Guess with Jess	January 3, 2014	December 26, 2014	
Harry and His Bucket Full of Dinosaurs	January 3, 2014	September 27, 2015	
Timothy Goes to School	January 3, 2014	December 26, 2014	
Doki	January 4, 2015	September 23, 2016	
Doki	December 30, 2016	June 23, 2017	
Dive, Olly, Dive!	January 4, 2015	December 27, 2015	
The Choo Choo Bob Show	October 4, 2015	June 21, 2017	
Raggs	January 1, 2016	June 22, 2017	
Nutri Ventures	September 30, 2016	December 23, 2016	
Zoo Clues	June 28, 2017	June 29, 2018	
Zoo Clues	January 4, 2019	September 25, 2020	
Secret Millionaires Club	June 29, 2017	June 29, 2018	
Thomas Edison's Secret Lab	June 30, 2017	June 29, 2018	
Animal Science	July 6, 2018	February 26, 2021	
Look Kool	July 6, 2018	December 28, 2018	
Giver	July 6, 2018	December 28, 2018	
Safari Tracks	January 4, 2019	December 27, 2019	
Finding Stuff Out	October 2, 2020	December 25, 2020	
Xploration Awesome Planet	January 1, 2021	February 26, 2021	

==== Short-form programming ====
Title	Premiere date	End date	Source(s)
Ask Me!	September 15, 2006	January 31, 2021	
The Zimmer Twins	2007	2010	
Vitaminix	November 3, 2008	February 22, 2011	

=== Ion Life/Plus ===
==== Acquired programming ====
Title	Premiere date	End date	Source(s)
Animal Science	September 8, 2020	December 28, 2020	
Secret Millionaires Club	September 28, 2020	February 22, 2021	
Finding Stuff Out	January 4, 2021	February 22, 2021	

==== Short-form programming ====
Title	Premiere date	End date	Source(s)
Zerby Derby shorts	September 8, 2020	February 22, 2021	
I'm an Animal	September 8, 2020	February 22, 2021	
BatteryPOP	September 8, 2020	February 22, 2021	
