= Cookie Jar Toons =

Daily children's block broadcast on This TV

Cookie Jar Toons This is for Kids
- Type: Daily children's programming block
- Country: United States
- Availability: Nationwide, though not in every market
- Owner: Cookie Jar Entertainment (2008–2012); DHX Cookie Jar (2012-2013); DHX Media (2012–2013)
- Launch date: November 1, 2008; 17 years ago
- Dissolved: October 31, 2013; 12 years ago
- Affiliation: This TV
- Replaced by: Unbranded E/I programming

Cookie Jar Toons (also known as This is for Kids) was a daily children's programming block on the This TV digital broadcast network when it was partially owned by the former Weigel Broadcasting (seven years later, the network was acquired by Allen Media Group). The block was programmed by Canada-based DHX Media (formerly Cookie Jar Entertainment and today as WildBrain).

The block used the name Cookie Jar Toons for E/I programs, and the name This Is for Kids for non-E/I programs. Many of animated and live action shows where broadcast on the block were Cookie Jar archive programs from predecessors DIC and Cinar, though some (i.e.: Mona the Vampire) had never been seen in the United States before; other programs (i.e.: Sonic Underground) were previously seen on other American networks.

On November 1, 2013, Tribune Broadcasting took over Weigel's half-ownership of This TV, causing the weekday lineup to be replaced with more airings of films, while the weekend block was reduced to Sunday mornings and, due to the basic three-hour minimum required to meet E/I guidelines without any non-E/I content, it was replaced with double airings of three live-action series from Bellum Entertainment; Animal Atlas, Zoo Clues, and On the Spot, which have no specific branding or continuity.

== Programming ==
^{E/I} Indicates program features content in line with FCC E/I programming guidelines.

=== E/I programming ===
| Title | Premiere date | End date | Original network | Source(s) |
|---|---|---|---|---|
| The Busy World of Richard Scarry^{E/I} | November 1, 2008 | August 29, 2009 | Showtime; Nickelodeon | |
| The Busy World of Richard Scarry^{E/I} | October 2, 2010 | October 26, 2013 | Showtime; Nickelodeon | |
| The Country Mouse and the City Mouse Adventures^{E/I} | November 1, 2008 | September 25, 2010 | HBO | |
| The Country Mouse and the City Mouse Adventures^{E/I} | October 6, 2012 | October 26, 2013 | HBO | |
| Wimzie's House^{E/I} | November 1, 2008 | September 25, 2010 | PBS Kids (PBS) | |
| Wimzie's House^{E/I} | October 6, 2012 | October 26, 2013 | PBS Kids (PBS) | |
| The Adventures of Paddington Bear^{E/I} | November 3, 2008 | August 28, 2009 | HBO | |
| Horseland^{E/I} | September 5, 2009 | September 27, 2010 | KOL Secret Slumber Party (CBS) | |
| Horseland^{E/I} | October 1, 2012 | October 31, 2013 | KOL Secret Slumber Party (CBS) | |
| Liberty's Kids^{E/I} | September 5, 2009 | September 27, 2010 | PBS Kids (PBS) | |
| Liberty's Kids^{E/I} | September 26, 2011 | September 28, 2012 | PBS Kids (PBS) | |
| Magi-Nation^{E/I} | September 27, 2010 | September 25, 2011 | Kids' WB! (The CW) | |
| Busytown Mysteries^{E/I} | October 2, 2010 | September 29, 2012 | Cookie Jar TV (CBS) | |
| Inspector Gadget^{E/I} | September 27, 2010 | September 23, 2011 | Syndication; CBS | |
| Inspector Gadget^{E/I} | October 1, 2012 | October 31, 2013 | Syndication; CBS | |
| Cake^{E/I} | October 2, 2010 | September 24, 2011 | KOL Secret Slumber Party (CBS) | |
| Dance Revolution^{E/I} | October 2, 2010 | September 24, 2011 | KOL Secret Slumber Party (CBS) | |
| Stargate Infinity^{E/I} | October 3, 2010 | September 25, 2011 | FoxBox (Fox) | |
| Stargate Infinity^{E/I} | October 2, 2012 | October 31, 2013 | FoxBox (Fox) | |
| DinoSquad^{E/I} | October 1, 2011 | September 29, 2012 | KEWLopolis (CBS) | |
| The Doodlebops^{E/I} | October 2, 2011 | October 27, 2013 | Disney Channel | |
| The Doodlebops Rockin' Road Show^{E/I} | October 2, 2011 | October 27, 2013 | Cookie Jar TV (CBS) | |
| Sabrina: The Animated Series^{E/I} | October 1, 2012 | October 31, 2013 | ABC Kids (ABC); Disney's One Too (UPN) | |
| Madeline^{E/I} | October 7, 2012 | October 27, 2013 | The Family Channel; ABC; Disney Channel | |

=== Non-E/I programming ===
| Title | Premiere date | End date | Original network | Source(s) |
|---|---|---|---|---|
| A Miss Mallard Mystery | November 2, 2008 | October 1, 2010 | Originally aired | |
| Spider Riders | November 2, 2008 | September 2011 | Kids' WB! (The WB/CW) | |
| Animal Crackers | November 2, 2008 | August 30, 2009 | Fox Family | |
| Robinson Sucroe | November 2, 2008 | August 28, 2009 | Originally aired | |
| Flight Squad | November 3, 2008 | August 28, 2009 | Toonturama (Telefutura) | |
| Flight Squad | October 2, 2012 | October 31, 2013 | Toonturama (Telefutura) | |
| Ripley's Believe It or Not!: The Animated Series | November 3, 2008 | August 28, 2009 | Fox Family | |
| Emily of New Moon | August 31, 2009 | October 1, 2010 | WAM! America's Kidz Network | |
| Emily of New Moon | September 26, 2011 | October 27, 2013 | WAM! America's Kidz Network | |
| Journey to the West: Legends of the Monkey King | August 31, 2009 | October 1, 2010 | Originally aired | |
| The Wonderful Wizard of Oz | August 31, 2009 | October 1, 2010 | HBO | |
| The Wonderful Wizard of Oz | September 26, 2011 | September 28, 2012 | HBO | |
| C.L.Y.D.E. | September 1, 2009 | September 30, 2010 | Originally aired | |
| Mummies Alive! | September 6, 2009 | September 26, 2010 | Syndication | |
| Potatoes and Dragons | September 6, 2009 | September 26, 2010 | Originally aired | |
| Gadget Boy's Adventures in History | September 27, 2010 | September 23, 2011 | The History Channel | |
| Heathcliff | September 27, 2010 | September 23, 2011 | Syndication | |
| The Wacky World of Tex Avery | September 27, 2010 | September 23, 2011 | Syndication | |
| Adventures of Sonic the Hedgehog | October 3, 2010 | September 25, 2011 | Syndication | (Note: Only the first 13 episodes were broadcast.) |
| Alienators: Evolution Continues | October 3, 2010 | September 25, 2011 | Fox Kids (Fox) | |
| Sonic Underground | October 3, 2010 | September 25, 2011 | BKN (Syndication) | |
| Mona the Vampire | September 26, 2011 | October 27, 2013 | Originally aired | |
| Tattooed Teenage Alien Fighters from Beverly Hills | September 26, 2011 | September 30, 2012 | USA Network | |
| Super Duper Sumos | October 2, 2011 | September 30, 2012 | Nickelodeon | |
| Dark Oracle | October 2, 2011 | September 30, 2012 | Originally aired | |
| Action Man | October 1, 2012 | October 30, 2013 | BKN (Syndication) | |
| Hurricanes | October 1, 2012 | October 30, 2013 | BKN (Syndication) | |
| MetaJets | October 1, 2012 | October 30, 2013 | Cartoon Network | |
| ProStars | October 2, 2012 | October 31, 2013 | NBC | |

=== Acquired programming ===
| Title | Premiere date | End date | Original network | Source(s) |
|---|---|---|---|---|
| Green Screen Adventures^{E/I} | September 6, 2009 | October 26, 2013 | WCIU-TV | (Note: A local program from former This TV flagship WCIU-TV) |
| The Pink Panther Show | September 27, 2010 | September 22, 2011 | NBC; ABC | (Note: Non-Cookie Jar-owned series.) |
| Danger Rangers^{E/I} | October 6, 2012 | October 26, 2013 | Public television stations | (Note: Distributed and presented by Cookie Jar.) |

== See also ==
- Cookie Jar Kids Network (Cookie Jar's former syndicated children's block)
- Cookie Jar TV (Cookie Jar's former Saturday morning children's block on CBS)
- KidsClick (A children's block from Sinclair Broadcast Group that also aired on This TV)
