= Unsealed =

Unsealed may refer to:

- Unsealed World News (shortform: Unsealed), an American Evangelical Christian news organization founded in 2010
- "UnSEALed" (NCIS), 2004 season 1 episode 18 of TV show NCIS
- Unsealed: Conspiracy Files, 2010s U.S. TV show
- Unsealed: Alien Files, 2010s U.S. TV show

== See also ==
- Seal (disambiguation)
- Seals (disambiguation)
- Unsöld (disambiguation)
- Unsoeld (surname)
- Unseld (surname)
