= First-run syndication in the United States, 2000s =

These are first-run syndicated television shows that air on commercial broadcast stations in a significant number of markets. If it has only aired in a few markets, it is not significantly important enough to be placed on this list. Note that shows listed here do not necessarily air in every market.

== Current programs ==
These shows currently air in first-run syndication.

=== Talk/conversation shows ===
- The Drew Barrymore Show (2020)
- The Jennifer Hudson Show (2022)
- Live with Kelly and Mark (1988)
- Tamron Hall (2019)
- TMZ Live (2013)

=== Tabloid/newsmagazine shows ===
- Entertainment Tonight (1981)
- Extra (1994)
- Inside Edition (1989)
- InvestigateTV+ (2024)
- TMZ (2007)

=== Game/competition shows ===
- Family Feud (1999)
- Flip Side (2024)
- Funny You Should Ask (2017)
- Jeopardy! (1984)
- The Perfect Line (2025)
- Scrambled Up (2025)
- 25 Words or Less (2019)
- Wheel of Fortune (1983)

=== Reality shows ===
- Deep Water Salvage (2025)
- Just for Laughs: Gags (2015)
- The Liquidator (2021)
- Live PD Presents (2025)
- The Song (2021)

=== Lifestyle shows ===
- The Advocates With Sonia Baghdady (2025)
- Raw Travel (2013)
- Taste Buds (2025)
- Small Town Big Deal (2015-present)

=== Makeover reality shows ===
- Ron Hazelton's HouseCalls (2000)

=== Movie talk shows ===
- The Backstage Experience (2025)
- Made in Hollywood (2005)

=== Reality/crime shows ===
- Alien Disclosure Files (2025)
- Almost Unsolved (2025)
- Bloodline Detectives (2020)
- Crime Beat (2025)
- Crime Exposé with Nancy O'Dell (2024)
- Cruise Ship Killers (2025)
- Deep Undercover (2024)
- Fatal Crimes (2023)
- Finally Caught (2024)
- Heartland Homicide (2025)
- ICrime with Elizabeth Vargas (2022)
- Missing (2003)
- Motive to Murder (2024)
- Scene of the Crime (2021)
- Top Secret Files: Declassified (2023)
- Web of Murder (2024)

=== Reality court/judicial shows ===
- America's Court with Judge Ross (2010)
- Cutlers Court (2023)
- Divorce Court (1999)
- Equal Justice with Judge Eboni K. Williams (2023)
- Hot Bench (2014)
- Judy Justice (2024)
- Justice for All with Judge Cristina Perez (2012)
- Justice for the People with Judge Milian (2023)
- Justice with Judge Mablean (2014)
- Mathis Court with Judge Mathis (2023)
- Supreme Justice with Judge Karen (2013)
- Tribunal Justice (2025)
- The Verdict with Judge Hatchett (2016)
- We the People with Judge Lauren Lake (2022)

=== Sports shows ===
- GMFB: Overtime (2024)
- She's in the Game (2025)
- WOW – Women of Wrestling (2022)

=== Viral/viewer-submitted video series ===
- Whacked Out Sports (2006)
- The World's Funniest Weather (2019)

=== Scripted series ===
- Heartland (2010)
- Murdoch Mysteries (2014)

=== Entertainment Studios ===
- The American Athlete (1996)
- Beautiful Homes & Great Estates (2002)
- Cars.tv (2009)
- Comedy.tv (2009)
- Comics Unleashed (2006)
- Entertainers (1993)
- EntertainmentStudios.com (2002)
- Every Woman (2000)
- Kickin' It (2002)
- My Destination.tv (2010)
- Pets.tv (2009)
- Recipe.tv (2004)
- The Young Icons (2010)

== Canceled/ended programs ==
These shows aired between 2000 and 2025, but production on these series has been halted.

=== Talk/conversation shows ===
- Access Daily with Mario & Kit (2010–2026)
- The Ananda Lewis Show (2001–2002)
- Anderson Live (2011–2013)
- The Arsenio Hall Show (2013–2014)
- Ask Rita (2003–2004)
- Bethenny (2013–2014)
- Better (2008–2012)
- The Bill Cunningham Show (2011–2016)
- The Bonnie Hunt Show (2008–2010)
- The Brian McKnight Show (2009–2010)
- The Caroline Rhea Show (2002–2003)
- The Cindy Margolis Show (2000–2001)
- CityLine (2017–2019)
- Crazy Talk (2015–2016)
- Doctor and The Diva (2019–2020)
- The Doctors (2008–2022)
- Donny & Marie (1998–2000)
- The Ellen DeGeneres Show (2003–2022)
- Forgive or Forget (1998–2001)
- FABLife (2015–2016)
- Face the Truth (2018–2019)
- Good Day Live (2002–2005)
- The Good Dish (2022)
- The Gossip Queens (2010–2011)
- The Greg Behrendt Show (2006–2007)
- Harry (2016–2018)
- Howard Stern Radio Show (1998–2001)
- In the Loop with iVillage (2006–2008)
- Iyanla (2001–2002)
- The Jane Pauley Show (2004–2005)
- The Jeff Probst Show (2012–2013)
- The Jenny Jones Show (1991–2003)
- The Jeremy Kyle Show (2011–2013)
- Jerry Springer (1991–2018)
- The John Walsh Show (2002–2004)
- Dr. Joy Browne (1999–2000)
- Katie (2012–2014)
- The Dr. Keith Ablow Show (2006–2007)
- The Larry Elder Show (2004–2005)
- Dr. Laura (2000–2001)
- Leeza (1994–2000)
- Lifechangers (2011–2012)
- Life & Style (2004–2005)
- Living It Up! with Ali & Jack (2003–2004)
- The Kelly Clarkson Show (2019-2026)
- Karamo (2022-2026)
- Martha (2005–2012; moved to Hallmark Channel in 2010)
- Martha Stewart Living (1993–2004)
- The Martin Short Show (1999–2000)
- Maury (1991–2022)
- The Megan Mullally Show (2006–2007)
- The Mel Robbins Show (2019–2020)
- Men are from Mars, Women are from Venus (2000–2001)
- The Meredith Vieira Show (2014–2016)
- The Montel Williams Show (1991–2008)
- The Morning Show with Mike and Juliet (2007–2009)
- The Nate Berkus Show (2010–2012)
- Nick Cannon (2021–2022)
- On Air With Ryan Seacrest (2004)
- The Oprah Winfrey Show (1986–2011)
- The Other Half (2001–2003)
- The Dr. Oz Show (2009–2022)
- Dr. Phil (2002–2023)
- Pickler & Ben (2017–2019)
- The Queen Latifah Show (1999–2001)
- The Queen Latifah Show (2013–2015)
- Rachael Ray (2006–2023)
- The Real (2014–2022)
- Richard Simmons' DreamMaker (1999–2000)
- Ricki Lake (1993–2004)
- The Ricki Lake Show (2012–2013)
- The Rob Nelson Show (2002–2003)
- The Robert Irvine Show (2016–2018)
- The Roseanne Show (1998–2000)
- The Rosie O'Donnell Show (1996–2002)
- Sally (1985–2002)
- The Sharon Osbourne Show (2003–2004)
- Sherri (2022-2026)
- Shop & Style (2003)
- Dr. Steve (2011–2012)
- Steve Harvey (2012–2017)
- Steve (2017–2019)
- The Steve Wilkos Show (2007-2026)
- Talk or Walk (2001–2002)
- The T.D. Jakes Show (2016–2017)
- The Test (2013–2014)
- The Tony Danza Show (2004–2006)
- The Trisha Goddard Show (2012–2014)
- The Tyra Banks Show (2005–2010; moved to The CW in 2009)
- The Wayne Brady Show (2002–2004)
- The Wendy Williams Show (2009–2022)

=== Tabloid/newsmagazine shows ===
- Access Hollywood (1996–2026)
- All Access (2019–2021)
- America Now (2013–2014)
- A Current Affair (2005)
- Celebrity Justice (2002–2005)
- Central Ave (2020–2021)
- DailyMailTV (2017–2022)
- Dish Nation (2012–2025)
- Geraldo at Large (2005–2007)
- Hollyscoop (2009–2014)
- Hollywood Today Live (2015–2017)
- The Insider (2004–2017)
- National Enquirer TV (1999–2001)
- On the Red Carpet (2013–2014)
- Page Six TV (2017–2019)
- Top 30 (2017–2019)

=== Game/competition shows ===
- America Says (2019–2020)
- Are You Smarter than a 5th Grader? (2009–2011)
- Card Sharks (2001–2002)
- Celebrity Name Game (2014–2017)
- Deal or No Deal (2008–2010)
- Don't Forget the Lyrics! (2010–2011)
- Hollywood Squares (1998–2004)
- Let's Ask America (2014–2015)
- Merv Griffin's Crosswords (2007–2008)
- Monopoly Millionaires' Club (2015–2016)
- On the Spot (2011–2012)
- People Puzzler (2023–2025)
- Person, Place or Thing (2023–2025)
- Pictionary (2022–2025)
- Pyramid (2002–2004)
- Sex Wars (2000–2001)
- Street Smarts (2000–2005)
- Temptation (2007–2008)
- To Tell the Truth (2000–2002)
- Trivial Pursuit: America Plays (2008–2009)
- Ultimate Poker Challenge (2004–2006)
- Weakest Link (2002–2003)
- Who the Bleep is That? (2023–2024)
- Who Wants to Be a Millionaire (2002–2019)
- You Bet Your Life (2021–2023)

=== Reality shows ===
- American Idol Rewind (2006–2010)
- America's Moving To (2002–2003)
- Arrest & Trial (2000–2001)
- Beyond With James Van Praagh (2002–2003)
- Classmates (2003–2004)
- Crossing Over With John Edward (2000–2004)
- The Grand Tour (2024–2025)
- Highway Thru Hell (2021–2024)
- Life Moments (2002–2003)
- NASCAR Angels (2006–2010)
- Nightwatch (2020–2021)
- Pat Croce Moving In (2004–2005)
- Petkeeping with Marc Morrone (2003–2004)
- SOS: How to Survive (2021–2022)
- Starting Over (2003–2006)
- Storm of Suspicion (2023–2025)
- Street Magic (2018–2023)

=== Reality dating shows ===
- Blind Date (1999–2006)
- Change of Heart (1998–2003)
- Cheaters (2000–2024)
- ElimiDate (2001–2006)
- Excused (2011–2013)
- EX-treme Dating (2002–2004)
- The 5th Wheel (2001–2004)
- Rendez-View (2001–2002)
- Shipmates (2001–2003)
- Who Wants to Date a Comedian (2011–2012)

=== Disputable discussion shows ===
- The Chris Matthews Show (2002–2013)
- Full Court Press With Greta Van Susteren (2019–2022)
- Matter of Fact with Soledad O'Brien (2015–2025)

=== Lifestyle shows ===
- American Latino TV (2002–2019)
- The Balancing Act (2021–2023)
- LatiNation (2004–2019)
- Portia (2023–2024)
- Weekend Vibe (2002–2004)
- Your Total Health (2004–2008)

=== Makeover reality shows ===
- Ambush Makeover (2003–2004)
- Bob Vila (2005–2007)
- Bob Vila's Home Again (1990–2005)
- Design Invasion (2004–2005)
- Fast: Home Rescue (2023–2025)
- Home Delivery (2004–2005)
- Hometeam (2005–2006)
- Live Like a Star (2004–2005)

=== Movie review shows ===
- At the Movies (1986–2010)
- Hot Ticket (2001–2004)
- Reel Talk (2007–2009)

=== Reality/crime shows ===
- The Conspiracy Show with Richard Syrett (2014–2015)
- Corrupt Crimes (2015–2019)
- Crime Watch Daily (2015–2018)
- Don't Blink (2017–2018)
- Forensic Justice (2021–2025)
- I Met My Murderer Online (2022–2024)
- Killer Mysteries (2017–2019)
- Law&Crime Daily (2020–2022)
- Live PD: Police Patrol (2018–2020)
- Murderous Affairs (2022–2025)
- Mysteries of the Unexplained (2017–2018)
- Prime Crime (2021–2022)
- Sheriffs: El Dorado County (2017–2020)
- True Crime Files (2018–2020)
- True Crime News (2024–2025)
- Unexplained Mysteries (2003–2005)
- Unsealed: Alien Files (2011–2015)
- Unsealed: Conspiracy Files (2012–2013)

=== Reality court/judicial shows ===
- Caught In Providence (2018–2020)
- Couples Court with the Cutlers (2017–2020)
- Cristina's Court (2006–2009)
- Curtis Court (2000–2001)
- Eye for an Eye (2003–2008)
- Family Court With Judge Penny (2008–2009)
- Judge Alex (2005–2014)
- Judge David Young (2007–2009)
- Judge Faith (2014–2018)
- Judge Hatchett (2000–2008)
- Judge Jeanine Pirro (2008–2011; moved from The CW in 2009)
- Judge Jerry (2019–2022)
- Judge Joe Brown (1998–2013)
- Judge Judy (1996–2021)
- Judge Karen (2008–2009)
- Judge Karen's Court (2010–2011)
- Judge Maria Lopez (2006–2008)
- Judge Mathis (1999–2023)
- Judge Mills Lane (1998–2001)
- Jury Duty (2007–2008)
- Last Shot With Judge Gunn (2011–2012)
- Lauren Lake's Paternity Court (2013–2020)
- Moral Court (2000–2001)
- The People's Court (1997–2023)
- Personal Injury Court (2019–2020)
- Power of Attorney (2000–2002)
- Protection Court (2019–2020)
- Relative Justice with Judge Rhonda Willis (2021–2023)
- Street Court (2009–2010)
- Swift Justice with Nancy Grace (2010–2012)
- Texas Justice (2001–2005)
- We the Jury (2002–2003)
- We the People With Gloria Allred (2011–2013)

=== Sports shows ===
- The George Michael Sports Machine (1984–2007)
- UFC Wired (2007–2009)

=== Variety shows ===
- The Big Big Show (2015–2016)
- Dance 360 (2004–2005)
- It's Showtime at the Apollo (1987–2007)
- Soul Train (1971–2008)
- That's Funny (2004–2006)
- The Tom Joyner Show (2005–2006)
- Your Big Break (2000–2001)

=== Viral/viewer-submitted video series ===
- Bloopers (2012–2014)
- Maximum Exposure (2000–2008)
- Real TV (1996–2001)
- Right This Minute (2011–2022)
- Ring Nation (2022–2023)
- Smash Cuts (2009–2011)
- Weather Gone Viral (2020–2023)
- Whacked Out Videos (2009–2018)
- What Went Down (2014–2017)
- World's Funniest Moments (2010–2012)

=== Scripted series ===
- Adventure Inc. (2003–2004)
- Andromeda (2000–2005, moved to Sci-Fi in 2004)
- Baywatch Hawaii (1999–2001)
- Beastmaster (1999–2002)
- Cleopatra 2525 (2000–2001)
- Cold Squad (2006–2008)
- Da Vinci's Inquest (2005–2012)
- Earth: Final Conflict (1997–2002)
- The First Family (2012–2015)
- The Immortal (2000–2001)
- Jack of All Trades (2000)
- John Woo's Once a Thief (2002–2003)
- Legend of the Seeker (2008–2010)
- The Listener (2018–2024)
- The Lost World (1999–2002)
- Masterminds (2006–2008)
- Mr. Box Office (2012–2015)
- Mutant X (2001–2004)
- Nite Tales (2009)
- The Pinkertons (2014–2015)
- Psi Factor (1996–2000)
- Queen of Swords (2000–2001)
- ReGenesis (2007–2009)
- Relic Hunter (1999–2002)
- Republic of Doyle (2013–2016)
- SAF3 (2013–2015)
- She Spies (2002–2004)
- Sheena (2000–2002)
- Starhunter (2003–2004)
- Stone Undercover (2007–2008)
- Tracker (2001–2002)
- V.I.P. (1998–2002)
- Viper (1996-1999)
- VIP Passport (2006–2007)
- Xena: Warrior Princess (1995–2001)

== See also ==
- The CW Plus
- MyNetworkTV, a broadcast syndication service (formerly a television network)
