= Class of the Titans =

2005 Canadian TV series

- The Chosen Ones. Clockwise from center: Jay, Theresa, Neil, Atlanta, Herry, Archie, and Odie.
- Genre: Urban fantasy; Science fiction; Comedy drama; Action; Adventure
- Created by: Chris Bartleman; Michael Lahay
- Developed by: Chris Bartleman; Michael Lahay
- Directed by: Brad Goodchild; Terry Klassen (voice)
- Voices of: Kirby Morrow; Meghan Black; Sarah Edmondson; Ty Olsson; Sam Vincent; Doron Bell Jr. Kelly Sheridan; Ted Cole; David Kaye
- Theme music composer: Michael Richard Plowman
- Composer: Michael Richard Plowman
- Countries of origin: Canada; Philippines
- Original language: English
- No. of seasons: 2
- No. of episodes: 52 (list of episodes)

Production
- Executive producers: Chris Bartleman; Blair Peters; Scott Dyer
- Producers: Alia Nakashima (season 1); Richard Pimm (season 2)
- Running time: 22 minutes
- Production companies: Studio B Productions; Top Draw Animation

Original release
- Network: Teletoon
- Release: December 31, 2005 – June 22, 2008

Class of the Titans is a Canadian animated television series produced by Studio B Productions and distributed by Nelvana Enterprises. It premiered on December 31, 2005, at 5 pm ET/PT, on Teletoon with a special 90-minute presentation of the first three episodes. The series aired in the United States on Qubo from September 19 to October 24, 2009. On April 1, 2012, the series returned to Qubo as part of its Qubo Night Owl block, replacing Spliced, where it aired until July 25, 2020.

== Synopsis ==
Cronus, the titan of time who was imprisoned in Tartarus for thousands of years after being defeated by his son Zeus, escapes when the planets align on New Year's Eve. An ancient prophecy predicts that seven teenage heroes, Jay, Atlanta, Herry, Archie, Theresa, Odie, and Neil, who are the descendants of ancient Greek heroes, will be the ones to defeat Cronus for good. After being found, they are brought to Olympus High School in New Olympia, where they train to become strong enough to face him while fighting against monsters he sends to attack them.

== Characters ==
=== Main ===
- Jay (voiced by Kirby Morrow) – "The Leader", a sixteen-year-old boy who is the descendant of Jason of the Argonauts and the first of the teenagers to be found. The leader of the group, he wields a xiphos with a retractable blade and takes his role as a hero seriously, possessing a strong sense of responsibility and work ethic. He is of Greek heritage on his mother's side and grew up with stories of classical mythology, making him more knowledgeable on the subject than the other heroes, and enjoys sailing. Though he has feelings for Theresa, they do not become a couple until they share a kiss in the series finale. His mentor is Hera.
- Atlanta (voiced by Meghan Black in season 1, Sarah Edmondson in season 2) – "The Hunter", a fifteen-year-old girl who is the descendant of Atalanta, and the second of the teenagers to be found. Born and raised in the Northwest Territories, she has a scar on her right shoulder from an incident with a puma and has enhanced reflexes and tracking abilities. She has a passion for weapons, primarily wielding jaw-trap steel bolas or a crossbow gauntlet, though enjoys hunting with traditional weapons such as a bow and arrow. Though she can be short-tempered and impulsive, she is studious and interested in environmental issues, being a volunteer for the Green Alliance.
- Herry (voiced by Ty Olsson) – "The Brawn", a sixteen-year-old farm boy who is the descendant of Hercules, who is also his mentor, and the third of the first three teenagers to be found. He has superhuman strength and often does not wield a weapon, preferring to use brute force. Though laid-back and easy-going, he has a short temper, which has caused him to get into trouble. Herry drives a pickup truck given to him by his grandmother, which Hephaestus modified and equipped to be the group's mode of transport.
- Archie (voiced by Sam Vincent) – "The Warrior", a fifteen-year-old boy who is the descendant of Achilles and the fourth teen brought to Olympus High. He wields the "Hephaestus Whip," a cross between a chain whip and a rope dart, which Hephaestus later upgrades to the "Adamantine Whip". He wears a brace covering his right shin and part of his right foot due to an unspecified medical condition that affects his heel. According to Dionysus, Archie, like Achilles, is immune to disease and has never been sick. In addition to his physical abilities, Archie is knowledgeable about Greek mythology from reading Greek poetry. He tends to be brash and self-centered, but is also withdrawn and cynical. His skepticism of the supernatural causes him to be initially hostile towards Theresa, dismissing her abilities as merely predictions, though they settle their differences. Though he had feelings for Atlanta since they first met, he is afraid to confess his feelings; when he does confess, she is initially afraid that their relationship will change, but reciprocates his feelings. His mentor is Ares.
- Theresa (voiced by Kelly Sheridan) – "The Fighter", a sixteen-year-old girl who is the descendant of Theseus and the sixth teen to be discovered. She is the group's second-in-command and assumes the role of leader when Jay is incapacitated. A black belt in taekwondo, she wields nunchucks and possesses a sixth sense, similar to clairvoyance or psychometry, and later gains telepathic and telekinetic powers. She comes from a wealthy family and her father owns cattle ranches across Canada. She is a talented lyre player, and, along with Atlanta, plays on Olympus High's field hockey team. After the gods push her too far, her powers grow out of control in the form of an evil spirit that drains the powers of most of the gods and Cronus, allowing the Chosen Ones to defeat him and fulfill the Oracle's prophecy. After draining Zeus, she declares that she and Jay are free, but is horrified to learn that Hera told Jay to kill her. Jay tries to convince her that the combined powers of the gods will destroy her, only for the Phantom to toss Jay aside, causing her to realize that she has gone too far. Theresa dies after being overwhelmed by his power, but Jay revives her with a kiss. Her mentor is Persephone.
- Odie (voiced by Doron Bell Jr.) – "The Brains", a sixteen-year-old boy who is the descendant of Odysseus and the fifth teen to be discovered. He is usually considered the youngest of the group due to his small stature, but is among the oldest. Though he does not wield a weapon, he is intelligent and adept with technology, serving as the group's tactician and using a walkie-talkie and a laptop given to him by Hermes, his mentor. He later befriends Polyphemus, whom Odysseus had blinded during his Odyssey. He suffers from claustrophobia, which he can overcome with a specially designed device that places the location elsewhere in his mind. His mentor is Hermes.
- Neil (voiced by Ted Cole) – "The Good Looking", a sixteen-year-old boy who is the descendant of Narcissus and the seventh and final teen to be discovered. He is vain and arrogant and works as a freelance model. Because of this, others initially doubt his status as a "hero". Neil considers himself to be cultured and an expert on fashion and becomes upset if his clothes get dirty. He is notorious for being late and is obsessed with horror films about vampires and werewolves. His luck helps him in combat and in winning games likes coin tosses and board games. Though he generally does not wield a weapon, when he does he can do so effectively. Despite his self-centered attitude, he cares for his friends and will help them when they need him most, even if it means putting aside his well-being. His mentor is Aphrodite.
- Cronus (voiced by David Kaye) – The main antagonist of the series, who combines traits of Cronus and Chronos. His sons Zeus, Poseidon, and Hades imprisoned him in Tartarus following the Titanomachy, but he escapes after the planets align on New Year's Eve and seeks to exact revenge on Zeus and the Olympians and take over the world. He controls several giants and fights the heroes, who are prophesied to defeat him, by sending monsters to attack them, convincing his allies to take out their anger on them, and forming alliances with the foes of the original heroes. As one of the most powerful immortals in existence and the god of time, Cronus has several powers, including manipulating time, creating portals, shapeshifting, and duplicating himself, though these powers weaken with overuse. He wields kama-like scythes that materialize out of thin air.

=== Supporting ===
- Chiron (voiced by Bruce Greenwood in season 1, Richard Newman in season 2) – A centaur who serves as a "human" encyclopedia of sorts, providing information and mythological knowledge and serving as a mentor for heroes.
- Granny (voiced by Peter Kelamis) – Herry's grandmother who raised him and gave him his pickup truck.
- The Horae – Commonly referred to as the Seasons, they consist of the Fall Horae, the Winter Horae, the Spring Horae (voiced by Kathleen Barr), and the Summer Horae. Inhabiting a mural that leads from Persephone's solarium to the Underworld, they regulate the seasons and appear as four maidens. They also have the ability to control time by visiting past seasons.
- The Oracle (voiced by Brian Drummond) – An old man who can foresee the future and is obligated to give such information to those who request it. He gave the prophecy that the heroes would one day defeat Cronus.

=== Greek gods ===
- Aphrodite (voiced by Tabitha St. Germain) – Neil's mentor and the goddess of love and beauty, who, like Neil, is air-headed and narcissistic. She spends most of her time making herself look more beautiful or admiring herself in the mirror.
- Apollo (voiced by Trevor Devall) - The twin brother of Artemis and god of the sun who appears as a pot-bellied man with facial hair and an Italian accent. Unlike other gods, he appears to be out of touch with modern times despite owning a boombox.
- Ares (voiced by Garry Chalk) – Archie's mentor and the god of war who provides the heroes with weapons and helps train them in the ways of fighting. While he favors armed and hand-to-hand combat, he understands the art of war and recognizes the importance of tactics and strategy in battle. Like Archie, he tends to be short-tempered and arrogant and is difficult to get along with.
- Artemis (voiced by Patricia Drake) – Atlanta's mentor and the goddess of the hunt, animals, and the moon. Like her, she is a great hunter and skilled in archery. Artemis is decisive and straightforward and enjoys competition.
- Athena (voiced by Kathleen Barr) – The head of Olympus High's dorm and the goddess of war, wisdom, and domestic arts. She is a good cook and skilled weaver. Athena wields a Makhaira.
- Demeter (voiced by Maxine Miller) - The mother of Persephone and the goddess of the harvest. After Persephone is trapped and causes an eternal winter, she takes the form of a cow and lends Neil and Atlanta her chariot to go to the Underworld after they charm her enough to ease the winter. When Persephone returns to the living world, Demeter restores the natural order and reunites with her.
- Dionysus (voiced by Michael Daingerfield) - The god of wine and leisure who is a skilled chemist. He believes that mistakes make you more knowledgeable which Odie is doubtful of.
- Eris (voiced by Lara Gilchrist) - The goddess of discord who appears as a teenage punk and enjoys graffiti art. Her powers affect both heroes and gods causing them to argue instead of working together.
- Eros (voiced by Terry Klassen) - The son of Aphrodite and the god of love who dislikes going by his Roman name of Cupid, but allows Psyche to call him by that name. He is a short, overweight, balding middle-aged man who lives in the suburbs.
- Fortuna (voiced by Nicole Oliver) - The goddess of fortune, a middle-aged woman who owns the Cornucopia and loves to gamble at the casino.
- Hades (voiced by Trevor Devall) – The god of the underworld who has an affectionate relationship with his wife Persephone and does not mind the heroes coming and going from the Underworld, but is willing to express his wrath on those who have overstepped themselves.
- Harmony (voiced by Judith Maxey) - The goddess of harmony who takes the form of a large purple cobra and works as a radio DJ.
- Hecate (voiced by Patricia Drake) - The goddess of witchcraft and creator of the Book of Incantations.
- Hephaestus (voiced by Brian Drummond) – The god of fire, volcanoes, metalworking, artisans, metallurgy, carpenters, forges, sculpting, and blacksmiths who makes the group's vehicles and other mechanical devices. He is disabled with his right leg being shorter than his left, though he uses special boots as a mobility aid to solve the problem. Odie studies with him and Hermes, though they often argue about the superiority of modern technology over ancient magical innovation.
- Hera (voiced by Patricia Drake) – Jay's mentor and the queen of the gods who is the principal of Olympus High. Like Jay, she is a natural leader and was the patron goddess who championed his ancestor Jason taking an active role in assisting Jay in his role as leader.
- Hercules (voiced by Garry Chalk) – Herry's mentor, the gatekeeper of Olympus, and god of strength and heroes. He has the appearance of a middle-aged, pot-bellied, balding man, but retains the strength he had in his glory days.
- Hermes (voiced by Brian Drummond) – Odie's mentor who is the messenger of the gods and the god of boundaries, invention, commerce, and travelers. Hermes wears a winged pilot cap, goggles, and winged boots. He is in charge of monitoring the gods' global networks and communication systems which were enhanced by Odie's installation of high-speed telephones. Hermes has a secret portal in his room emblazoned with the caduceus that can transport anyone to anywhere they wish. His caduceus is the symbol of heralds, and he can use it to control animals. Like Odie, Hermes is a skilled inventor and is the god most familiar with the human world.
- Morpheus (voiced by Stephen Dimopoulos) - The god of sleep who appears as a laid-back, slightly overweight, and short man who resides in the Realm of Dreams.
- Nemesis (voiced by Nicole Oliver) - The goddess of vengeance who takes the form of a blindfolded woman carrying a sword and a pair of scales.
- Pan (voiced by Mark Hildreth) - The god of the wild. Disguised as a student at New Olympia named Phil, he is known locally as DJ Panic, a DJ popular with ladies who attracts the attention of Atlanta. However, he secretly wreaks havoc using hypnotizing trance music and controlling plants, particularly vines.
- Persephone (voiced by Tabitha St. Germain) – Theresa's mentor and the queen of the underworld who has two distinct temperaments – one gentle and light-hearted, and the other uncontrollable and spiteful, which emerges when she is angry. To fulfill her agreement to spend half her time in the Underworld with her husband Hades, Persephone has a secret passageway in her solarium to the Underworld which allows the heroes access to the Underworld. She is fond of gardening and has a loving relationship with her husband and their "puppy" Cerberus. Like Theresa, she has a connection to the supernatural and vast wealth.
- Poseidon (voiced by French Tickner) - The god of the sea who wields a large trident that can be used to control water, though he can exert some control over water without it. Despite having a human-like appearance with a blueish-green beard and hair, Poseidon is usually in the form of a giant merman with fins on his head and arms and a crown made of shells.
- Psyche (voiced by Tabitha St. Germain) - The goddess of the soul and wife of Eros.
- Thanatos (voiced by Trevor Devall) - The god of death, who serves whoever wears Hades' Helmet of Darkness. He appears as a mild-mannered and soft-spoken middle-aged man, but his true form is a skeletal winged creature who can appear from shadows and dissipate into the air.
- Zeus (voiced by Christopher Gaze) – The king of the gods, god of thunder, and husband of Hera. He is a grumpy-looking bearded man who is disorganized and absent-minded as a result of using up his powers to return the Chosen Ones to the future after thwarting Cronus' victory during the Titanomachy. In the season one finale, Zeus is revealed to work at Olympus High as a janitor under the alias of Mr. Suez.

=== Other mythological figures ===
- Adonis (voiced by Trevor Devall) - A hunter who Aphrodite and Persephone fought over, causing him to be placed in Pandora's Box to await the winner of the competition. After Neil accidentally frees Adonis from Pandora's Box, he restarts the competition between Aphrodite and Persephone, causing Envy to appear.
- Antaeus (voiced by Scott McNeil) - A half-giant who gets stronger when he is in contact with the ground.
- Atlas (voiced by Scott McNeil) - A Titan who fought with Cronus during the Titanomachy. When the Olympian gods won, Zeus punished Atlas by having him hold up the sky.
  - Pleione (voiced by Maxine Miller) - An Oceanid and the wife of Atlas. She tends to Atlas and helps him deal with the back pain caused by his punishment.
- Charon - A ferryman of the Underworld who wears a hooded robe that leaves only his eyes and mouth visible.
- Gaia (voiced by Shirley Milner) - The personification of Earth who is the mother of Cronus, the Titans, and the Cyclopes and the grandmother of Zeus, Poseidon, Hades, Hera, and Demeter.
- Lycan (voiced by Russell Roberts) - A king who Zeus turned into a wolf. Using Atalanta's blood, Cronus revives King Lycan, who attacks Atalanta in a werewolf-like form. After Archie faces his fears, he throws a silver medallion into Lycan's mouth, killing him.
- Minos (voiced by Trevor Devall) - The King of Crete who became one of the three judges of the Underworld after his death. He is tasked with sentencing newly-arrived souls to the Underworld's locations.
- Sisyphus (voiced by Fred Keaton) - A king who cheated death twice and was condemned to Tartarus to roll a boulder up a hill for eternity. Cronus frees King Sisyphus and grants him shapeshifting abilities in exchange for getting one of the heroes to take his place in Tartarus. After Theresa is captured, the heroes enlist Thanatos to defeat him and save her.
- King Tantalus (voiced by William Samples) - A king who cut up his son and fed him to the gods and was condemned to Tartarus in a pool of water adrift on a branch where he is unable to eat or drink. Atlanta encounters him in his part of Tartarus and refuses to help him because of his crimes. Tantalus curses Atlanta with the desire to have something that she cannot obtain.
- Orion (voiced by Mark Acheson) - A giant hunter and lover of Artemis who was placed among the stars after she killed him.
- Peirithous (voiced by Michael Donovan) - A friend of Theseus who, along with him, traveled to the Underworld in an attempt to abduct Persephone. Hades trapped them in the Chairs of Forgetfulness. Hercules was able to rescue Theseus, but was unable to free Perithous as the Underworld shook when he tried to free him. Hades frees Peirithous upon his death and as revenge for how Earth has changed, he plants a tree that attracted Olympian bees to poison the ambrosia. After the heroes thwart his plan, Peirithous and Hercules reconcile.

=== Monsters ===
- Aspidochelone - An island turtle that has Aeolus' temple on its back.
- Campe (voiced by Pam Hyatt in season 1, Pauline Newstone in season 2) - The Jailer of Tartarus who is humanoid, but has the lower body of a snake and a scorpion on her back that can detach from her body.
- Cerberus - A three-headed hellhound with three skeletal heads and a snake-headed tail who guards the entrance to the underworld to prevent its residents from escaping.
- Chimera - A hybrid monster that has the head and front legs of a lion, the back legs of a goat and a goat head emerging from its back, and a cobra-headed tail. After Cronus revives it, it poisons Jay and the heroes travel to the Underworld in search of a cure.
- Cyclopes - A race of one-eyed giants.
  - Cyclops Brothers - Three cyclopes and the children of Gaia and Uranus. They were killed by Cronus.
    - Arges (voiced by David Kaye) - One of the three Cyclops brothers.
    - Brontes (voiced by Brian Drummond) - One of the three Cyclops brothers.
    - Steropes - One of the three Cyclops brothers.
  - Polyphemus (voiced by Terry Klassen) - A Cyclops who Odysseus blinded and who Cronus unsuccessfully attempts to convince that Odie is Odysseus.
- Giants - The henchmen of Cronus, who Cronus can change to have the characteristics of animals. They are strong, but have low intelligence.
  - Agrius - A light blue giant with tusks and the lower body of a spirit bear.
  - Agnon - An olive-colored giant with a red goatee that is loyal to Cronus.
  - Oreius - A light blue giant with the upper body of a spirit bear.
- Gorgons - Humanoid women with venomous black snakes in place of hair. They can turn others to stone through contact with them.
  - Medusa (voiced by Pauline Newstone) - One of the three Gorgon sisters.
  - Stheno (voiced by Maxine Miller) - One of the three Gorgon sisters and the biggest of the group.
  - Euryale (voiced by Belinda Metz) - One of the three Gorgon sisters and the tallest of the group.
- Kraken - A giant green-skinned sea monster with an octopus-shaped head and an eel-like lower body who Cronus awakens to get revenge on Poseidon.
- Manticore - A lion-like creature with dragon-like wings and a scorpion tail who can shoot poisonous spikes to paralyze or kill its victims.
- Minotaur (vocal effects provided by Ty Olsson) - A creature with the head and hindquarters of a bull and the torso and arms of a man. Cronus obtains the bones of the Minotaur and tricks a scientist into cloning an army of Minotaurs that obey him.
- Sphinx (voiced by Kathleen Barr) - A creature with the haunches of a lion, bird-like wings, and a feminine human face. She gives riddles to people and kills those who cannot answer them.
- Sirens - A trio of female monsters known for their songs that lure men to their deaths. They appear as three beautiful young women, but their true forms are creatures that resemble serpents and birds.
- Sybaris - A female serpentine monster with the tail of a snake and the wings of a bat wings.
- Telkhines (voiced by Ted Cole, David Kaye, William Samples, and Sam Vincent) - Dog-faced sea monsters with flippers in place of hands who are alchemists and blacksmiths.
- Typhoeus - A large red humanoid creature and father of all monsters with green eyes, two snakes in place of legs, and leathery wings. Cronus frees him from his prison in Mount Etna, but Archie and Atlanta defeat him.

== Releases ==
The series was released on DVD. The first DVD, Chaos, was released on February 19, 2008, and included episodes 1-3 and a behind-the-scenes featurette. The second DVD, Trojan Horse, was released on May 20, 2008, and contained episodes 4–6. "Class of the Titans: Vol. 1 Season 1" was released on November 18, 2008, and contained episodes 1–13.

In 2016, Amazon uploaded the series on Amazon Prime, with the episodes listed as being part of four 13-episode "seasons". In 2019, Nelvana's Retro Rerun began uploading the episodes to their YouTube channel.
