= List of Class of the Titans episodes =

The following is a list of episodes of the Canadian animated series Class of the Titans created by Studio B Productions and Nelvana. The first three episodes premiered on December 31, 2005 at 5PM ET/PT on Teletoon as a special 90-minute presentation.

== Episodes ==
=== Season 1 (2005–06) ===
Episodes 1, 2, and 3 aired as a 90-minute 'special presentation'. Episodes 8 and 18 were meant to air on Halloween and Valentine's Day respectively when the series was still originally supposed to air in September 2005 in Canada. These episodes first aired in Australia and Singapore respectively.

No.	Title	Written by	Original air date (Teletoon)	U.S. air date
1	"Chaos 101, Part I"	Victor Nicolle	December 31, 2005 (special); August 28, 2006 (episode)	September 19, 2009 (United States); 13 February 2015 (Australia)
On New Year's Eve, Cronus escapes from Tartarus during the planetary alignment. His first act to take revenge on the Gods begins with him freeing Typhoeus from his imprisonment. The oracle tells him that seven heroes will stop him. The first three heroes (Jay, Atlanta, and Herry) are found and brought to New Olympia.
2	"Chaos 101, Part II"	Victor Nicolle (story); Julian Fryes (teleplay)	December 31, 2005 (special); August 29, 2006 (episode)	September 20, 2009 (United States); 13 February 2015 (Australia)
Archie, Theresa, and Odie are added to the team in time to help defeat the Typhoeus and Cronus.
3	"Chaos 101, Part III"	Chris Bartleman (story); John Slama (teleplay)	December 31, 2005 (special); August 30, 2006 (episode)	October 3, 2009 (United States); 20 February 2015 (Australia)
The Titans desperately try to reach Neil, the 7th and final hero, before Cronus coaxes him to join his side.
4	"Man's Worst Enemy"	Ben Joseph; Franklin Young	January 4, 2006	October 10, 2009 (United States); 27 February 2015 (Australia)
Dogs begin acting strangely in New Olympia, including the dog that belongs to Herry's grandmother. This leads to the discovery that Cronus unleashed Cerberus from the Underworld.
5	"The Nature of Things"	Ben Joseph; Franklin Young	January 11, 2006	October 17, 2009 (United States); 6 March 2015 (Australia)
Atlanta falls for Phil, an environmental-protection promoting DJ, unaware that he is truly the demigod, Pan, with sinister plans for fans of his music.
6	"Trojan Horse"	Dennis Heaton	January 18, 2006	October 24, 2009 (United States); 13 March 2015 (Australia)
Feeling like the weak link in the team, Odie meets with Cronus, who offers him superhuman strength in return for the beast-taming staff of Hermes.
7	"The Antikythera Device"	Michael Lahay	January 25, 2006	20 March 2015 (Australia)
The Titans attempt to trap Cronus by baiting him with an ancient artifact. However, Cronus gets away with the artifact to locate Atlantis, where the ancient Antikythera Device rests, which has the power to sink all of the Earth.
8	"See You at the Crossroads"	Martin Borycki (story); Annika Hagen (teleplay)	October 22, 2006	June 6, 2006 (Australia); 27 March 2015 (Australia)
Cronus unleashes Hecate, the goddess of witchcraft, to begin chaos on Halloween.
9	"Sibling Rivalry"	Ken Cuperus	February 1, 2006	3 April 2015 (Australia)
Construction workers at the zoo unknowingly free the Gorgon Medusa from her petrified state, only to be captured by Neil. When her sisters Stheno and Euryale come out of hiding and capture Neil, the others must meet their demands to bring them Medusa in exchange for Neil's freedom.
10	"Mazed and Confused"	Louise Moon	February 8, 2006	10 April 2015 (Australia)
Cronus obtains the bones of the original Minotaur and tricks a scientist into cloning the bones so that Cronus can raise an army of Minotaurs that obey his every command. These Minotaurs escape into an underground Labyrinth and begin capturing tourists to eat later.
11	"Field of Nightmares"	Ian Weir	February 15, 2006	17 April 2015 (Australia)
Cronus locates Medelia, a descendant of Medea, the witch who was betrayed by Jason, and awakens the magic within her to use against the Titans.
12	"Prisoner Kampe"	Dennis Heaton	March 13, 2006	24 April 2015 (Australia)
Kampe, the jailer of Tartarus, attempts to forcefully use the Titans to recapture Cronus. At the same time, Cronus captures Herry's grandmother to lure him to the Temple of Prometheus, where Prometheus was chained and had his liver pecked out by a giant bird.
13	"Little Box of Horrors"	Richard Clark	February 22, 2006	8 May 2015 (Australia)
Archie opens Pandora's Box and releases Hope and a disease that was trapped with her that infects Atlanta.
14	"Make-up Exam"	Dennis Heaton	March 14, 2006	8 May 2015 (Australia)
Arachne joins Cronus to regain her human form by hypnotizing Atlanta into luring her fellow Titans into a trap.
15	"The Odie-sey"	John Slama	March 15, 2006	15 May 2015 (Australia)
Jay, Neil and Odie encounter a major storm resulting in them crashing on the island of Calypso. This is the work of Cronus, who has deposed Aeolus and taken control of the winds. And worse, Calypso, former lover of Odysseus, won't let Odie leave.
16	"Get Kraken"	Martin Borycki	March 16, 2006	22 May 2015 (Australia)
As part of his revenge on Poseidon, Cronus frees the Kraken from its imprisonment and then has Poseidon chained up on the beach. Now it is up to the chosen ones to save Poseidon and defeat the Kraken.
17	"Eye for an Eye"	Brad Birch	March 17, 2006	29 May 2015 (Australia)
Cronus grants the cyclops Polyphemus back his eyesight, in exchange for trapping the Titans, especially Odie, descendant of Odysseus.
18	"Bows and Eros"	Nicole Demerse	March 17, 2006	5 June 2015 (Australia)
Cronus has kidnapped Eros and Psyche on Valentine's Day and forces Eros into spreading hate among the heroes and the city. Now, Jay and Neil have to save the rest of the team before it's too late with the help of Aphrodite.
19	"Road to Hades"	Dennis Heaton	April 5, 2006	12 June 2015 (Australia)
Poisoned by a Chimera, Jay has to literally fight Fate while the others find a cure. While Cronus makes plans for his ascension now that the prophecy is broken, the others race through the Underworld in search of the only thing that can bring Jay back.
20	"Many Happy Returns"	Ben Joseph; Franklin Young	March 29, 2006	19 June 2015 (Australia)
Two of Hephaestus's robots have been located. Unfortunately, Cronus takes the opportunity to reanimate the bronze-giant Talos that was stored with them.
21	"Labour Day"	Gary Fisher (story); Julian Fryes (teleplay)	April 19, 2006	26 June 2015 (Australia)
Cronus sends Herry back in time to face a few of the Twelve Labors of Hercules, while having Sirens distract the other heroes.
22	"They Might be G.I.Ants"	Louise Moon	April 26, 2006	3 July 2015 (Australia)
Cronus locates a magical grieve which he uses to turn army men into giant ants. The Titans have to stop them while Zeus locates the other grieve to reverse the transformation.
23	"Cronus' Flying Circus"	Leslie Mildner (story); Julian Fryes (teleplay)	May 3, 2006	10 July 2015 (Australia)
Cronus unleashes the Stymphalian birds upon the Titans.
24	"Sybaris Fountain"	Brad Birch	May 10, 2006	17 July 2015 (Australia)
Cronus reanimates a Lamia queen named Sybaris, the first known vampire, to take revenge on the Titans. Hearing about this, Hera decides to personally intervene.
25	"The Last Word"	Annika Hagen (story); Ken Cuperus (teleplay)	May 24, 2006	24 July 2015 (Australia)
Neil is kidnapped by Echo, who has regained physical form. Cronus takes advantage of this to kidnap the other Titans.
26	"Time After Time"	Louise Moon	May 31, 2006	24 July 2015 (Australia)
On New Year's Eve, Cronus plots to put a damper on the heroes' party by killing Odie with a Manticore. Yet Jay finds a way to go back in time to prevent this after learning of Cronus's time-travel plot by Chiron. Not wanting to be undone, Cronus plans to go back in time to change the outcome of the Titanomachy.

=== Season 2 (2007–08) ===
The second season first aired on Teletoon on August 17, 2007.

No.	Title	Written by	Original air date (Teletoon)	U.S. air date
27	"Cronus Vanquished"	Richard Clark	September 5, 2007	July 12, 2010 (USA)
When Cronus is taken down by the heroes, he ends up in the Underworld and manages to swipe Hades' crown, enabling him to gain control of the Underworld and even Thanatos.
28	"Graes Anatomy"	Ben Joseph; Franklin Young	August 17, 2007	July 19, 2010 (USA)
Odie locates the Eye of the Graes, which could locate Cronus wherever he goes. However, the Graes themselves want it back.
29	"Star Quality"	Mark Leiren-Young	September 23, 2007	July 26, 2010 (USA)
Cronus summons Orion from his constellation in the sky to use him against Atlanta. Meanwhile the team's antics are caught on camera by one of Neil's fans who now want to know everything about him.
30	"Forget Me Not"	Mark Leiren-Young	September 30, 2007	August 2, 2010
The Titans lose their memories in the Underworld, along with Cronus, leaving Neil to save the day.
31	"Time Enough For Everything"	Dennis Heaton	October 7, 2007	August 9, 2010 (USA)
Aggravated by his team's constant abuse of his time, Odie steals the Time Piece of Zeus, which he secretly uses to locate the Tablet of Prometheus, which can make or unmake humanity. Unfortunately, Cronus becomes aware of Odie's manipulation of time.
32	"Pandemonium"	Mark Leiren-Young	October 9, 2007	August 16, 2010 (USA)
Cronus has polluted the golden apples, which threaten to wipe the gods from existence. Atlanta and Archie must locate Pan to fix it before it's too late.
33	"Nothing To Fear But Fear Itself"	Betty Quan	October 28, 2007	August 23, 2010 (USA)
After looking into the Mask of Phobos, Archie becomes scared of everything. Following a brief encounter with the chosen ones, Cronus uses Atlanta's blood and the bone samples of King Lykon (who had been turned into a werewolf by Zeus) as part of a spell that resurrects King Lykon. When King Lykon starts to target Atlanta, and Archie must overcome the effects of the Mask of Phobos to save her.
34	"Cold Day in Hades"	John Slama	November 4, 2007	August 30, 2010 (USA)
Demeter is angry when Persephone is trapped and causes a worldwide winter.
35	"Tantalize This"	Betty Quan	November 11, 2007	September 06, 2010 (USA)
Atlanta ends up cursed by King Tantalus when she refuses to help him get out of his current fate. This curse causes Atlanta to desire whatever she can't obtain, which proves to be a problem when it comes to Cronus' latest plot.
36	"Mother Knows Best"	Mark Leiren-Young	November 18, 2007	October 04, 2010 (USA)
Cronus's mother, Gaia, appears to him in an ancient city and helps him capture Zeus, who happens to be with the heroes at a party in Herry's grandmother's house.
37	"Applet of Discord"	Louise Moon	November 25, 2007	October 11, 2010 (USA)
Eris, the Goddess of Discord, appears in New Olympia. Using a cellphone, she spreads discord and chaos.
38	"Bad Blood"	Betty Quan	December 2, 2007	October 18, 2010 (USA)
Cronus hires the thief Autolycus, Hermes' son, to steal the arrow that Hercules once used to slay the Hydra.
39	"Dreamweaver"	Michael Lahay; Mark Leiren-Young	December 9, 2007	October 25, 2010 (USA)
The gang plans to trick Cronus into believing a vision Theresa sent, offering supremacy over the gods, and plans to trap him and send him back to Tartarus.
40	"Breathtaking Beauty"	Doug Molitor	March 2, 2008	May 3, 2011 (USA)
Odie, upset from Neil's teasing, leaves town - only to be trapped by an angry sphinx, who has trapped an entire town unless her riddle is solved.
41	"Recipe for Disaster"	John Slama	April 6, 2008	May 10, 2011 (USA)
Pirithoüs is back from the dead and looking for revenge against Hercules, who abandoned him in the Underworld. He poisons the nectar required for the gods' ambrosia.
42	"Polyphemus Returns"	Brad Birch; Michael Lahay	April 13, 2008	May 17, 2011 (USA)
When Cronus calls upon the ghosts of three cyclopes to forge an ultimate weapon, Polyphemus sends a distress signal to Odie and the Titans.
43	"Cronus 2.0"	John Slama	April 27, 2008	May 24, 2011 (USA)
Odie creates an android duplicate of Cronus. However, the android becomes more methodical than the original and begins menacing the Titans.
44	"The Game Plan"	Michael Lahay	December 30, 2007	May 31, 2011 (USA)
When Neil is tricked by Cronus and Zeus is captured as a result, the Titans must seek out Fortuna, the Goddess of Good Luck and Fortune, for the Cornucopia to wish him back. Unfortunately, father and son play a game of chess that literally affects the Titans' very lives.
45	"Like a Rolling Stone"	Doug Molitor	May 11, 2008	June 7, 2011 (USA)
Cronus frees King Sisyphus from his punishment in Tartarus and provides him with a metamorphosis ability which will enable him to become any of the heroes so that one of them can take Sisyphus' place. The heroes must help Thanatos recapture Sisyphus.
46	"Cronus' Keystroke"	Betty Quan	May 18, 2008	June 14, 2011 (USA)
Cronus frees the Telkhines (imprisoned by Poseidon) in exchange for unlocking the secret of the New Olympia key taken from Theresa. The Titans must stop Cronus from breaking into the heroes' sanctuary and prevent the Telkines from exacting revenge on Poseidon.
47	"Daedalus or Alive"	John Slama	May 25, 2008	June 21, 2011 (USA)
When Odie discovers that some of Daedalus' old inventions may still be in his workshop, he, Jay, and Herry leave their studies to go and check it out. When they learn that Daedalus is alive, they are soon trapped in his labyrinth, forcing Theresa and the others to go and save them.
48	"Face Off"	Betty Quan	June 1, 2008	June 28, 2011 (USA)
Feeling pushed aside by the return of ultimate pretty-boy Adonis, Neil challenges him to a beauty contest. Things go as expected until rampant jealousy summons Envy to the proceedings.
49	"The Deep End"	Betty Quan	June 8, 2008	July 5, 2011 (USA)
The river god Scamander was defeated by Achilles millennia ago and now seeks revenge through Achilles' descendant, Archie. Archie must confront his fear of water in order to save himself and his friends from terrible danger.
50	"Golden Boy"	Doug Molitor	June 15, 2008	July 12, 2011 (USA)
Neil is punished by Nemesis for his self-centreness by granting him the Midas Touch - which soon causes the heroes' plan to capture Cronus to go awry and all of Neil's friends to be turned into golden statues.
51	"Phantom Rising Part 1"	Mark Leiren-Young	June 22, 2008	July 19, 2011 (USA)
When the gods are mysteriously attacked by a phantom and their powers drained, the heroes believe Cronus is responsible. To their horror, they discover Theresa has been pushed too far by the Gods and now her powers are out of control.
52	"Phantom Rising Part 2"	Mark Leiren-Young	June 22, 2008	July 26, 2011 (USA)
With the Power of the Olympian gods at her command, Theresa defeats Cronus... and now she's after Zeus. It's a battle that rivals not even Zeus has faced before and even his brute force can't seem to stop her... but maybe her friends can.

== DVD releases ==
Three DVDs have been released so far, all containing episodes from season one.

Title	Release date	#
"Chaos"	February 19, 2008	1-3
"Chaos"	The first DVD to be released contain the first three episodes: "Chaos 101", "Chaos 102","Chaos 103" and includes a behind-the-scenes featurette. It contains one disc and runs at 67 minutes in length.	
"Trojan Horse"	February 20, 2008	4-6
"Trojan Horse"	The second DVD contains episodes 4-6: "Man's Worst Enemy", "The Nature of Things","The Trojan Horse". It contains one disc and also runs at 67 minutes in length.	
"Season 1, Volume 1"	November 18, 2008 (Canada); October 6, 2009 (United States)	1-13
"Season 1, Volume 1"	This DVD set contains the first thirteen episodes: 1-13. It contains two discs and runs at 285 minutes in length.	
