= Unsöld =

Unsöld may refer to:

== People ==
- Albrecht Unsöld (1905–1995), German astrophysicist
- Oliver Unsöld (born 1973), German soccer player

== Places ==
- 2842 Unsöld, the asteroid Unsöld, a main belt asteroid, the 2842th asteroid registered

== See also ==
- Unsoeld, a surname
- Unseld (surname)
- Unsealed (disambiguation)
