= Unsoeld =

Unsoeld is a surname. Notable people with the surname include:

- Jolene Unsoeld (1931–2021), American politician
- Willi Unsoeld (1926–1979), American mountaineer

== See also ==
- Unseld (surname)
- Unsöld
- Unsealed (disambiguation)
