= John B. Wells =

American actor

- Born: Missouri, US
- Education: Texas Christian University (BFA)
- Occupations: Talk radio host, voice actor
- Known for: Coast to Coast AM

John B. Wells is an American talk radio host, voice actor, and former weekend host of Coast to Coast AM. In addition to his film and television work, Wells has worked at television stations and radio stations across Texas and around the world.

== Career ==
He has appeared on international stations such as Brazil's Network Jovem Pan; the UK's BBC Radio 1; Danceradio Amsterdam; Hamburg's HIT95 OK Radio; Paris' Radio ADO; and national stations such as: KZEW; WCBS (AM); WNEW-FM; KLOS; KROQ-FM; WWJ (AM); WBBM (AM); WZZM; WFAA-TV; KRLD (AM); KZPS; KLOL; KHOU; KPRC (AM); WBGG-FM; KRON-TV; KUSA-TV; American Forces Network.

He has been the voice of jingle demos for both JAM Creative Productions and TM Studios. He was an announcer for The Late Late Show with Craig Kilborn. He has done voice over acting for films such as: Houston: The Legend of Texas, Talk Radio, JFK and Hexed, and television series such as Team Knight Rider, Deadliest Catch, Gold Rush, Unsealed: Conspiracy Files, and Unsealed Alien Files. He also played Kuykendall in the film Gone to Texas.

In January 2012, he replaced Ian Punnett as the Saturday evening and the second Sunday evening host of Coast to Coast AM. He was fired in January 2014 and became the host of his own subscriber-based program, Caravan to Midnight.

In April 2016, Wells debuted a Saturday night program Ark Midnight. In April 2020, the show became syndicated by Talk Media Network.

On December 1, 2020, John B. Wells debuted Caravan To Midnight as a nightly, two-hour radio program.

In 2018, an article from the Southern Poverty Law Center characterized Wells as "the host of a couple of far-right podcasts".

== Personal life ==
Wells was born in Missouri and raised in Fort Worth, Texas. He received a Bachelor of Fine Arts with emphasis in Theater from Texas Christian University. His interests include: acting, music, writing, composing, martial arts, and aviation.
