= Unseld (surname) =

Unseld is a surname. Notable people with the surname include:

- Anton Unseld (1894–1932), German footballer and manager
- Benjamin Carl Unseld (1843–1923), American gospel music teacher, composer, and publisher
- Wes Unseld (1946–2020), American basketball player, coach, and executive
- Wes Unseld Jr., American basketball coach

== See also ==
- Unsöld (disambiguation)
- Unsoeld (surname)
- Unsealed (disambiguation)
