= Journey to the West: Legends of the Monkey King =

Chinese animated television series

- Also known as: Chinese: 西游记
- Genre: Fantasy; Adventure
- Based on: Journey to the West by Wu Cheng-en
- Countries of origin: China; Canada
- Original languages: Mandarin; English
- No. of episodes: 26 (52 segments); 1 special

Production
- Animator: Suzhou Hong Yang Cartoon Production Co., Ltd. (uncredited)
- Running time: 22 minutes (11 minutes per segment); 75 minutes (special)
- Production companies: China Central Television; CINAR Corporation

Original release
- Network: China Central Television(China); Teletoon(Canada)
- Release: 11 March – 4 June 2000(Canada)

Journey to the West: Legends of the Monkey King is a 1999 animated series produced by China Central Television and the Quebec-based CINAR Corporation. It is based on the 16th-century novel Journey to the West. There are 26 episodes (52 segments) in total, with a duration of about 22 minutes each (11 minutes per segment), along with a 75-minute prequel television film. In the original 1999 Chinese edition of the series, there are instead 52 episodes with each segment being extended to a full, half-hour episode with added animation and dialogue, and the prequels making up episodes 1–7.

The English-language version of the show was produced by Cinar (now WildBrain, previously Cookie Jar Group and then DHX Media). It first aired on Teletoon in Canada in 2000, and was later aired on the Cookie Jar Toons block on This TV in the U.S. from 2009 to 2010. In Indonesia, it was broadcast by Indosiar in 1999 to 2000 every Monday morning.

The production began in 1992. It has since been regarded as a classic of Chinese animation.

== Summary ==
Sun Wukong, who was born from a magic stone, has been imprisoned underneath a mountain for five centuries for his mischief in the heavens. One day, the Guanyin told Monkey that the Monk Tang Sanzang will set him free and Monkey will join him on a pilgrimage from China to India. The next day, Tripitaka came and set Monkey free, and the two started their Journey to the West. Along the way, they meet two new friends, Zhu Bajie and the Hermit Sha Wujing, who join them on the journey; together, they face many dangers and evil creatures and sorcerers and learn to get along.

== Cast ==
Character (English name)	Mandarin Chinese voice	English voice
Sun Wukong (The Monkey King)	Zhang Hanyu (episodes 1-7); Shen Xiaoqian (episodes 8-52)	Thor Bishopric
Tang Sanzang (Tripitaka)	Qiao Zhen	Terrence Scammell
Zhu Bajie (Pigsy)	Cheng Yuzhu	Mark Camacho
Sha Wujing (Sandy)	Liu Feng	A.J. Henderson
White Dragon Horse	Liu Qin	unknown
Emperor of China	unknown	Russell Yuen
Buddha	Tong Zirong	unknown
Guanyin	Wang Jianxin	Ellen David

Additional voices (Mandarin): Hai Fan, Di Feifei, Luo Gangsheng, Diang Jianhua, Liu Qin, Bai Tao, Wang Xiaobing, Sun Yufeng, Jiang Yuling

== Episodes ==
Episode #	Mandarin Chinese title	English title
1	猴王出世/ 龙宫取宝	Free At Last/ The Dragon
2	养马风波/ 大闹天宫	The Magic Robe/ The Monster and the Monk
3	大战二郎神/ 难逃佛掌心 (I)	Prisoners of Black Wind Mountain/ The Third Traveler
4	难逃佛掌心 (II)/ 师徒喜相逢	The Desert Sandstorms/ The Fourth Traveler
5	智收白龙马/ 恶僧盗袈裟	The Stolen Fruit/ The Fallen Tree
6	制服黑熊妖/ 猪八戒拜师	A Witch in Disguise/ Danger in the Pine Forest
7	险走黄风岭/ 流沙河收徒	The Yellow Giant/ The Counterfeit Prince
8	偷吃人参果/ 观音救仙树	The Return Of Monkey/ The Gnomes of Cloudy Peak
9	三打白骨精/ 误入波月洞	Monkey and the Two Gnomes/ The Dream
10	唐僧变老虎/ 八戒请悟空	The King Returns/ The Scarlet Scamp
11	平顶山遇险/ 莲花洞降妖	The Prisoner of Fire Cloud Cave/ Taming the Scamp
12	老国王托梦/ 乌鸡国除妖	The Mistreated Monks/ The Three Tests
13	悟空遇圣婴/ 收伏红孩儿	The Iron Catfish/ Buffalo Man
14	车迟国比武/ 大圣除三妖	The Land of Women/ A Queen in Love
15	夜阻通天河/ 苦斗独角怪	The Tale of the Scorpion/ Monkey Business
16	女儿国奇遇/ 琵琶洞逼婚	Double Trouble/ The Flaming Mountains
17	真假孙悟空/ 佛祖识猕猴	The Fake Husband/ Bull Fright
18	被困火焰山/ 激战牛魔王	The Mysterious Golden Egg/ The Magic Cymbals
19	火烧盘丝洞/ 消灭蜈蚣精	The Imperial Diamond/ The Smiling Buddha
20	金光塔平冤/ 假西天遭难	Tale of the Heartsick King/ The Magic Bells
21	弥勒收妖童/ 悟空成名医	The Spider Queen/ Wrath of the Centipede
22	巧取紫金铃/ 勇闯狮驼岭	The Curse of the Alabaster Bottle/ The Lion and the Elephant
23	大圣斗三魔/ 拯救比丘国	Monkey Meets Mischief/ The Evil Queen
24	填平无底洞/ 糊涂老国王	The Wicked Sisters/ Prisoners in the Sunset Kingdom
25	大闹连环洞/ 天竺国招亲	The Theft/ Here Comes the Bride
26	嫦娥收玉兔/ 灵山取真经	Five Tripitakas/ Journey's End

== Movie ==
A separate 75-minute television film under the same title serves as a prequel to the series.
