= Spliced (TV series) =

- Genre: Adventure; Slapstick; Surreal comedy
- Created by: Simon Racioppa; Richard Elliott
- Based on: The Island of Doctor Moreau by H.G. Wells
- Directed by: Matt Ferguson
- Voices of: Rob Stefaniuk; Joe Pingue; Katie Crown; Patrick McKenna; Mike Kiss; Julie Lemieux; Kedar Brown
- Theme music composer: Blair Packham
- Composer: Paul Intson
- Country of origin: Canada
- Original language: English
- No. of seasons: 1
- No. of episodes: 26 (52 segments)

Production
- Executive producers: Scott Dyer; Doug Murphy; Simon Racioppa; Richard Elliott
- Producer: Vanessa Tilley
- Running time: 22 minutes (11 minutes per segment)
- Production company: Nelvana

Original release
- Network: Teletoon
- Release: September 19, 2009 – March 13, 2010

Spliced is a Canadian animated television series produced by Nelvana in association with Teletoon that aired from April 1, 2010 to September 30, 2010 in its Canadian release.

== Plot ==
Spliced is a modern take of H. G. Wells' 1896 science-fiction, The Island of Doctor Moreau. Spliced marginally distorts Wells' characters in this modern twist by making the mutants the result of genetic experiments created by recombinant DNA rather than Wells' original vivisection process. As with the original story, these experimental results, plus one platypus not in the original story, live on an isolated tropical island that is called "Keep Away Island" in the cartoon. The mad scientist who created them was arrested and removed by authorities via boat. Left to their own devices, these mutated beasts form a functional society.

== Characters ==
- Peri (voiced by Rob Stefaniuk) is a kind-hearted and considerate orange-furred mutant, and is always the first one between him and his best friend, Entrée, to realize when their mischief has gone too far. With that said, despite regularly hanging out with Entrée, even he can barely tolerate his selfishness and low intelligence at times. Peri is an expert bowler, and he and Entrée have developed their trademark game, "bucket-stick-fruit-ball". It is unknown what animals he is a mutant of, but he appears to have the body of a fox or red squirrel and the tentacles of a squid, octopus, or cuttlefish, and is revealed to be part-butterfly in "Nobody's Cult But Mine".
- Entrée (voiced by Joe Pingue) is Peri's best friend. Entrée was created as the perfect food animal, with a cow's udders, a pig's body and nose, a chicken's wings and comb, and a shrimp's tail. Since he has lacks visible legs, Entrée "walks" on his teats, which are capable of time travel and light show effects. Entrée is very self-centered and gluttonous, and is always seeking instant self-gratification, no matter the cost.
- Two-Legs Joe (voiced by Pat McKenna) and Lord Wingus Eternum (voiced by Tom McCamus) are a conjoined mutant consisting of Joe, a two-legged rhinoceros, and Wingus, a bird growing out of his backside. Joe is the mayor of the town the mutants live in, which, to his frustration, is constantly being destroyed by Peri and Entrée. In the episode, "One Joe Wingus", it is revealed that Joe and Wingus were the Doctor's first creations. Wingus was born first and was the son of his species' ruler. When Joe emerged from his body, Wingus left, rather than face rejection.
- Patricia (voiced by Katie Crown) is a platypus who happened to live on Keep Away Island when the Doctor set up shop. She feels very lonely on Keep Away Island, being the only creature that is not spliced. She is an author and has been shown writing a book of poetry, as well as the novel, Marzipan Meadows and the Kingdom of Adventure. She is a master of the martial art, Plat Kwon Do.
- Princess Pony Apehands (voiced by Kedar Brown) has the head and tail of a pony and the body of a gorilla. Because she has the mental capacity of a very young girl, Princess Pony Apehands does not understand her own strength and often hurts others when she is simply trying to play with them or give them a hug. She also has a rather short temper, and will intentionally hurt any mutant who angers her.
- Compuhorse (voiced by Pat McKenna) is a horse with a computer implant. He cannot move his lips, but speaks similarly to Stephen Hawking, with a synthesized voice through his keyboard.
- Fuzzy Snuggums (voiced by Julie Lemieux) is a small, furry creature of indeterminate species who wishes to explore and seek adventure, but always fails. Long ago, Fuzzy was chosen by the doctor to combat against robots created by another scientist on a different island. Fuzzy was made indestructible, which benefits him, as his exploration attempts usually backfire upon him painfully. Though usually small and cute, Fuzzy's true form personality, which can resurface under extreme circumstances, is that of a giant, musclebound brawler.
- Mister Smarty Smarts (voiced by Mike Kiss) is a villainous combination of a dolphin, chimpanzee and a Jack Russell Terrier with a well-developed primate brain, who seeks to take over the island. He resides in a lair which is located on a slope of the volcano. Mister Smarty Pants is quite egotistical, believing the rest of the island inhabitants to be fools.
- Octocat (voiced by Katie Crown) is a combination of a cat and an octopus, who is Mister Smarty Smarts' assistant/minion. Unlike the other mutants, she cannot talk, conversing solely in meows, but the others are still able to understand her. Like Fuzzy, she was created to be a super-soldier and can assume a musclebound fighting form.
- The Wunny Sharbit is a combination of a rabbit, a great white shark, and a chainsaw. He will devour any other creature on Keep Away Island, including inanimate objects like stone and steel. The Wunny Sharbit usually does not speak; in the episode, "My Fair Shark Bunny", he was provided a collar that gave him the capability of speech. His voice in the episode was provided by Jess Gibbons.
- The Doctor is a mad scientist who created the mutants of Keep Away Island in his secret lair. Having been arrested for his crimes against nature years ago, he never appears in the series proper beyond its theme song and flashbacks.

== Episodes ==
No.	Title	Written by	Storyboarded by	Canadian air date	U.S. air date	UK air date
1	"Bowled Over" / "Stuck Together"	Simon Racioppa and Richard Elliott	Michael Smukavic Matt Ferguson	April 1, 2010	September 19, 2009	February 2, 2010
"Bowled Over" – Peri wants to know what he's good at. After running from Two–Legs Joe, Peri and Entrée find a secret room for bowling, Peri realizes that he was born to bowl. However, in trying to prove his bowling ball can be used for other activities, Peri is frustrated by the results and throws the ball into the volcano. After this, an alien civilization, the Pinnians, decide to take over the island and treat the mutants like slaves. By realizing these aliens have a kinship with bowling, Peri decides to confront them doing what he does best. "Stuck Together" – In search of fun in the lab, Peri and Entrée find one of the doctor's journals, which supposedly tells what the purpose of Peri is. The friends go to visit Mister Smarty Smarts hoping he can read Peri's purpose to them, but it turns out he can't read. He lies and says Peri was created to be the best friend of Entrée. Peri, excited at discovering his purpose, becomes obsessed with Entrée, who cannot bear being constantly chased by Peri. To teach Peri a lesson about personal space, Entrée decides to splice them together.
2	"No Play for Princess" / "Cleaning Up"	Simon Racioppa & Richard Elliott	Cal Brunker Sahle Robinson	May 20, 2010	September 20, 2009	February 3, 2010
"No Play for Princess" – Peri and Entrée are looking for someone to play a game of Bucket–Stick–Fruit–Ball with them, but nobody wants to. The terrifying Princess Pony Apehands is the only one who wants to join in. However, she plays too rough, so Peri and Entrée quickly try to ditch her. Princess throws a major temper tantrum and decides to smash the old nuclear reactor. "Cleaning Up" – When Peri finds out he has small creatures living in his fur, he wants to keep them so they can have a little society there, but when he begins to stink, everybody wants to clean him.
3	"Outsmartered" / "Gordon"	Simon Racioppa & Richard Elliott	Michael Smukavic Jason Armstrong	May 6, 2010	October 3, 2009	February 4, 2010
"Outsmartered" – Mister Smarty Smarts, tired of the incompetence and ineptitude of the inhabitants of the island, creates a device to make everyone smarter. His utopia is soon ruined when everyone's intelligence goes way past his. After being treated like an idiot, Smarts decides to make everyone unintelligent again. "Gordon" – After escaping Princess Pony's tickle attack, Peri and Entrée find an old golf cart. Entrée repairs the vehicle, replacing the engine with the brain of an evil robot. After naming it Gordon, Peri and Entrée travel around the island with their new car. After a few days of driving, Peri and Entrée don't want to drive again for a while. After they abandon Gordon in the jungle, he decides to cause trouble.
4	"Fairly Odd Princesses" / "Brothers in Farms"	Simon Racioppa & Richard Elliott	Cal Brunker Sahle Robinson	April 22, 2010	October 10, 2009	February 5, 2010
"Fairly Odd Princesses" – After Peri and Entrée accidentally shoot themselves into the sky with one of Fuzzy's transportations, Entrée uses his chicken wings to stop him and Peri falling to their death. However, he crashes through a building and loses control. After they crash through a make–up store, a clothesline and a wig shop (completely changing their appearance) they land in the tree house of Princess Pony Apehands, who believes they are magical fairies. After learning she'll give them everything they ask for in return for fairy tales and fairy songs, Entrée decides to use Princess to get everything he wants. "Brothers in Farms" – Peri and Entrée find a mustachioed Entrée–like being frozen in a block of ice. The two friends thaw him out and learn that his name is Apéritif. Apéritif introduces himself to Entrée's "delicious" friends, who all admire him more than Entrée. Entrée, thinking he is nothing compared to his brother, decides to freeze himself, but soon discovers that Apéritif is not the gentleman everyone thinks he is.
5	"Roots" / "Two Arms Joe"	Mike Kiss Simon Racioppa and Richard Elliott	Blair Kitchen Michael Smukavic	April 29, 2010	October 17, 2009	February 9, 2010
"Roots" – Entrée pushes his laziness to a new level and he literally grows roots, roots he wishes he didn't have when it's Keep Away Island's Super Crazy Funday! "Two Arms Joe" – Peri and Entrée want to thank Joe for everything he's done for them and the island. After asking Compuhorse what they could do to make him happy, they decide to give him Peri's arms for a day. Joe is pleased, but grows too fond of Peri's arms and doesn't want to give them back.
6	"Honorary Freak" / "Come to the Dork Side"	Simon Racioppa and Richard Elliott Tim Burns	Sahle Robinson Jason Armstrong	April 1, 2010	October 24, 2009	February 10, 2010
"Honorary Freak" – Peri and Entrée want to know why Patricia is so upset and become "The Smile Squad," trying to cheer her up in outlandish and fruitless ways. When that fails and they make her even more upset, they decide to use a brainscan machine to look into her mind and see what she's thinking. They find out that Patricia feels lonely because she's the only non–mutant on the island. After some thinking, Peri comes up with the perfect plan to make her feel like one of them. "Come to the Dork Side" – Realizing that Peri's ability to innocently cause mayhem could be harnessed, Smarty Smarts attempts to turn him evil.
7	"Best Before Date" / "Stompabout"	Tim Burns Mike Kiss	Mike Smukavic Blair Kitchen	May 27, 2010	October 31, 2009	February 11, 2010
"Best Before Date" – At the supermarket, Entrée has a barcode on his butt scanned, and finds out that he is two days away from his "best before date", after which he will supposedly turn to mush. After a day of trying desperately to "turn back the clock", Entrée switches places with Peri, pretending that Peri is Entrée, with only a day to live. Peri, buying the deception, decides to destroy all of "his" stuff, and tells his friends what he really thinks of them, as read in "his" diary. When the time finally comes, Peri realizes the truth, and Entrée, instead of turning to mush, gains a hair–like growth of mould. "Stompabout" – When Peri and Entrée accidentally cause a Whirrel to destroy half the town, Joe loses his temper, demolishing the other half. The other mutants tell Joe that he needs to control his temper. Joe, hurt, leaves, declaring Peri and Entrée the new mayors. In solitude, Joe hears from the bird on his back, Lord Wingus Eternum, who teaches him how to control his anger. However, when an entire pack of Whirrels attacks the town, Joe is forced to regain his temper in order to stop them.
8	"Amazon" / "Juice"	Simon Racioppa and Richard Elliott	Sahle Robinson Cal Brunker	May 13, 2010	November 7, 2009	February 12, 2010
"Amazon" – Patricia goes on vacation, reluctantly leaving Peri and Entrée as housesitters. Peri and Entrée end up turning the house into an indoor jungle and, when Patricia gets back, she is captured by her pet Mole-sters, who have turned into a savage tribe by their new environment. Peri and Entrée mount a rescue attempt, but discover that the Mole-sters have actually made Patricia their queen. "Juice" – Entrée becomes obsessed with getting everyone to like him. An accident with a pair of very tight jeans makes him realize that the milk from his top–right udder, "Nugget", is very tasty. Everyone loves the "Nugget" milk, and Entrée soon becomes incredibly popular, to the point where he shuns Peri. However, everyone else then becomes addicted to the milk and, when "Nugget" runs dry, they chase after Entrée.
9	"Stupid Means Never Having to Say I'm Sorry" / "Cube Whacked"	Dale Shott Simon Racioppa and Richard Elliott	Mike Smukavic Blair Kitchen	TBA	November 14, 2009	February 15, 2010
"Stupid Means Never Having to Say I'm Sorry" – Entrée's lucky stone goes missing, and his extreme methods of recovering it and stubbornness when it comes to apologizing lands him and Peri on a deserted island. "Cube Whacked" – Compuhorse is boring. At least, that's what Peri and Entrée think, until they discover his built–in video game, Cubewhacker.
10	"Fuzzy's Great Journey" / "Octocataclysm"	Simon Racioppa and Richard Elliott Mike Kiss	Jason Armstrong Sahle Robinson	TBA	November 21, 2009	February 16, 2010
"Fuzzy's Great Journey" – Peri and the others try to cheer Fuzzy up by making the island look like the long-sought goal in Fuzzy's jungle journeys. "Octocataclysm" – While Mister Smarty Smarts ponders where he went wrong after another plan ends in defeat, Octocat looks to carry out a plan of her own.
11	"Promises, Promises" / "There Will Be Stomp"	Simon Racioppa and Richard Elliott	Michael Smukavic Sahle Robinson	TBA May 27, 2014	November 28, 2009	February 17, 2010
"Promises, Promises" – Entrée discovers the most amazing thing: People will give you almost anything if you make them a promise in return. But when all those promises come due, he's forced to make good on a promise he'll regret. "There Will Be Stomp" – After a particularly exhausting day of stomping, Joe wakes up to find out that he can no longer stomp. Peri and Entrée decide to help Joe find his stomp again by bringing him to his "happy place". Meanwhile, Smarty Smarts capitalizes on Joe's lack of stomping by using his "Cyber–Stomper" machine to terrorize the town.
12	"Taste of Friendship" / "Sugar Low"	Simon Racioppa and Richard Elliott Mike Kiss	Jason Armstrong Blair Kitchen	September 13, 2010	December 5, 2009	February 18, 2010
"Taste of Friendship" – Peri gains super powers after licking a glowing rock in the lab and Entrée grows jealous as a result. "Sugar Low" – Peri receives a cookie for helping Patricia out and, realizing how good it feels, decides to help more civilians with their problems, culminating in him eating all the treats he received as thanks and enduring the mother of all sugar rushes.
13	"Compu–Peri" / "Marzipan Meadows and the Kingdom of Adventure"	Simon Racioppa and Richard Elliott	Michael Smukavic Blair Kitchen	June 17, 2010	December 12, 2009	February 19, 2010
"Compu–Peri" – Peri gets a new pet, Pistachio, a buppy (a bat-like puppy), but he runs away. After visiting Compuhorse, Peri decides to not feel any emotions anymore, becoming "Compu–Peri". His friends decide to try and snap him out of it. "Marzipan Meadows and the Kingdom of Adventure" – While working on her novel, "Marzipan Meadows and the Kingdom of Adventure", Patricia is constantly disturbed by the antics of the other islanders. She quickly loses her temper, threatening to beat everyone up if they don't let her work in peace. When Patricia tries to move on with her story, she experiences writer's block, and realizes that her friends' crazy antics actually gave her inspiration.
14	"Livin' La Vida Lava" / "Mo' Mayo, Mo' Problems"	Dale Schott Simon Racioppa and Richard Elliott	Jason Armstrong Sahle Robinson	August 5, 2010	December 19, 2009	May 4, 2010
"Livin' La Vida Lava" – Peri, Entrée, Joe and Patricia find a remote that can control a nearby volcano. However, their playing with the remote drains the volcano of lava and leads to a second ice age in which yetis are the dominant species. "Mo Mayo, Mo' Problems" – Entrée decides to eat nothing but mayonnaise for the rest of his life, which leads to a chain of events culminating in a monster produced out of the condiment spawning and terrorizing everyone.
15	"Walkie-Talkie Spinesuckie" / "My Fair Shark Bunny"	Simon Racioppa and Richard Elliott	Michael Smukavic, Cal Brunker and Peter Roe Blair Kitchen	August 12, 2010	December 26, 2009	May 5, 2010
"Walkie-Talkie Spiniesuckie" – While trying to find batteries for a "Mr. Jigglesworth" toy, Peri and Entrée find a pair of walkie–talkies, and use them to pull pranks on the other mutants. Soon after, though, Entrée starts using his walkie–talkie to ask Peri for help with everything, causing Peri to discard his in anger, leaving the former ripe for Smarty Smarts' latest scheme. "My Fair Shark Bunny" – While being chased by the Wunny Sharbit, Peri manages to trap him in a glass tube, which he finds out has a translator device that allows Wunny to speak. Putting the translator around Wunny's neck, Peri takes it upon himself to teach Wunny the difference between friends and food.
16	"The Mutants Who Cried Monster" / "Pink"	Dale Schott Simon Racioppa and Richard Elliott	Jason Armstrong Sahle Robinson	April 15, 2010	January 2, 2010	May 5, 2010
"The Mutants Who Cried Monster" – After their friends laugh at them for crying monster, Peri and Entrée try to make a monster of a cute little mutant called Melvin. "Pink" – Peri wakes up one day and finds he has turned completely pink, but doesn't know how to handle the new look.
17	"Pork Chop!" / "Same Difference"	Simon Racioppa and Richard Elliott Mike Kiss	Michael Smukavic Blair Kitchen	September 15, 2010	January 9, 2010	May 7, 2010
"Pork Chop!"– Entrée, desperate for respect, finds a helmet in the Doctor's lab, which teaches him kung fu. Entrée is quickly corrupted by his new–found talent, and takes over the entire town, beating up anyone who challenges him. Peri uses the helmet to learn how to make balloon shapes, using this skill to defeat Entrée. "Same Difference" – After being tormented by Peri and Entrée, Smarty Smarts and Joe go to their "happy place," only to find out that it's the same place. Realizing that they share a mutual dislike of the annoying duo, the two become friends, pooling their resources to deflect Peri and Entrée's antics, and pulling a few pranks of their own. Note: When Joe and Smarty Smarts are in the cinema, a clip from Grossology can be seen.
18	"Follow Your Dreamworms" / "Of Masters and Minions"	Simon Racioppa and Richard Elliott	Jason Armstrong Sahle Robinson	September 16, 2010	January 16, 2010	May 11, 2010
"Follow Your Dreamworms" – After Entrée laughs at Fuzzy Snuggums' latest attempt at exploring, Peri tells him that it's Fuzzy's dream. He shows Entrée that Patricia and Joe have dreams too, but Entrée scoffs, saying his only dream is to eat something delicious. After eating a pickled egg from the Doctor's fridge, Entrée passes out. After waking up, he starts to hear a voice in his head telling him to do things. "Of Masters and Minions" – When Mr. Smarty Smarts blames Octocat for all of his mistakes, she leaves and makes Peri her new master.
19	"Whirrel Call" / "Nightmare on Condemned Street"	Simon Racioppa and Richard Elliott	Blair Kitchen Drew Ng	September 13, 2010	January 23, 2010	June 3, 2010
"Whirrel Call" – While picking on a Whirrel (a squirrel-like whale) named Ed, Entrée and his victim fall off a cliff. The landing causes their brains to pop out and rebound into each others' heads. Entrée quickly enjoys his new life as a Whirrel, and the unassuming Peri enjoys Ed's pleasant attitude. Entrée is then ordered by a group of Whirrels to kill himself for his crimes against Whirrel–kind. "Nightmare on Condemned Street" – After a series of nightmares, Peri decides to use one of the Doctor's dream machines to enter his subconscious and confront his nightmare monster. However, once inside, he discovers that the toaster–headed monster isn't such a bad guy, after all. Together with Entrée and Patricia, they become "Dream Gladiators", protecting the dreams of all the mutants on the island.
20	"Nobody's Cult But Mine" / "Stomach on Strike"	Dale Schott Simon Racioppa and Richard Elliott	Jason Armstrong and Drew Ng Sahle Robinson	July 16, 2010	January 30, 2010	June 4, 2010
"Nobody's Cult But Mine" – After experiencing painful itching, Peri becomes a chrysalis, emerging to reveal a beautiful pair of butterfly wings, which hypnotizes anyone who looks at them. Entrée takes advantage of this by charging the other mutants food to look at Peri's wings. Mister Smarty Smarts tells Peri that Entrée is using him, convinces him to banish Entrée, and starts using him for his own nefarious goals. "Stomach on Strike" – Sick of the constant abuse Entrée heaps upon them, his stomach, heart and brain suddenly jump out of his body, abandoning him. Entrée then ingests Peri, having him fulfill the roles of his AWOL organs. After a few false starts, the arrangement becomes satisfactory for both of them. However, Entrée's organs return, having outstayed their welcome by annoying everyone else on the island.
21	"Living Hellp" / "Sgt. Snuggums"	Mike Kiss Simon Racioppa and Richard Elliott	Blair Kitchen Nick Cross	September 23, 2010	February 6, 2010	June 4, 2010
"Living Hellp" – After a busy day of helping the other mutants, Patricia creates "Mrs. Motherly", a computer system designed to help everyone on the island with her. Mrs. Motherly's drones go off to help, but they soon start doing literally everything for the mutants, even restraining them when they clarify that they're perfectly capable of handling the tasks themselves. Sick of this, Patricia, Entrée and Peri team up to shut down Mrs. Motherly. "Sgt. Snuggums" – Peri and Entrée torment Fuzzy with a pranking game called "Island Fools", causing him to turn into a musclebound brawler, who sees every other mutant as a robot to be smashed. Knowing that only another super–soldier can beat a super–soldier, Joe tries to convince Octocat to fight Fuzzy.
22	"Jetpackin'" / "Mole–sters in the Mist"	Simon Racioppa and Richard Elliott	Sahle Robinson Jason Armstrong	September 18, 2010	February 13, 2010	October 12, 2010
"Jetpackin" – Entrée is very bored and figures a jetpack might cure his boredom. "Mole–sters in the Mist" – After Entrée gets into a fight with a Mole–ster named Sid, Peri takes care of it. After a number of days, Sid leaves. Meanwhile, Mister Smarty Smarts has developed a shrink ray, which he uses to shrink all the town members. Peri and Entrée decide to ask the Mole–sters for help.
23	"Yetis Don't Care About Nothin'" / "Clones Don't Care 'Bout Nothin' Either"	Simon Racioppa and Richard Elliott	Michael Smukavic Blair Kitchen	September 30, 2010	February 20, 2010	October 13, 2010
"Yetis Don't Care About Nothin'" – Entrée is bored and decides to have fun on the island. Peri, Joe and Patricia stop him and he accuses them as fun wreckers. The next morning, Entrée jet–skis the island to the Arctic and the island is attacked by Yetis. When Entrée discovers that Yetis can do whatever they want, he decides to join them. "Clones Don't Care 'Bout Nothin' Either" – When Peri and Entrée decide that they have too many things to do, they use one of the Doctor's old machines to make themselves some clones (Pontie and Underpants) to help them get things done. However, the two clones decide to take over Peri and Entrée's lives forever. This episode also includes the short, "Message in a Bottle".
24	"Helen" / "The Count of Pinchy Crabbo" "Griddle Attraction" / "The Count of Pinchy Crabbo"	Dale Schott Simon Racioppa and Richard Elliott	Jason Armstrong Sahle Robinson	October 19, 2010	February 27, 2010	October 14, 2010
"Helen" – Peri, Entrée and Joe fall in love with and fight over a pancake (some TV guides list this episode as "Griddle Attraction"). "The Count of Pinchy Crabbo" – After being chased by the Wunny Sharbit, Peri and Entrée get stuck up a tree. Entrée makes a hang glider out of his chicken wings and promises to come back for Peri. But when he meets a mysterious mutant and becomes friends with him, he forgets about Peri. After some time, however, the new guy starts to torture Entrée with a game called "Now That I Have Your Trust, It's Time Ror Revenge".
25	"Mr. Wrinkles in Time" / "Bite, Shuffle and Moan"	Simon Racioppa and Richard Elliott Dale Schott	Michael Smukavic Blair Kitchen	September 11, 2010	March 6, 2010	TBA
"Mr. Wrinkles in Time" – Entrée time–travels with Patricia and Peri to find out why Two–Legs Joe doesn't like him. "Bite, Shuffle and Moan" – Peri is feeling under the weather and his refusal to stay in bed leads to problems for everyone around him when his illness worsens.
26	"One Joe Wingus" / "Poosh and the Quest for the Blargy Parble"	Mike Kiss Simon Racioppa and Richard Elliott	Jason Armstrong Sahle Robinson	September 11, 2010	March 13, 2010	October 19, 2010
"One Joe Wingus" – After Lord Wingus Eturnium convinces Joe to go to the other side of the island (with "help" from Peri and Entrée) to meet with his kind, he is given a choice to have Joe separated from himself, but finds that it means having Joe ground off of him. "Poosh and the Quest for the Blargy Parble" – After Peri discovers that saying "poosh" can make Entrée do anything he wants him to, he works him to exhaustion. When Patricia and Two–Legs Joe find out, they decide to send Peri on a quest for the mythical Blargy Parble to give Entrée time to rest.

== Broadcast ==
Spliced had its worldwide debut on Jetix in Latin America on April 20, 2009. Starting in April 2010, the series aired in Canada on Teletoon. in the United States on Qubo, in Australia on ABC3, (now ABC Me) in the United Kingdom and Ireland on Nicktoons in Latin America on Disney XD, and in Sweden on Nickelodeon. The series started airing in the United States on the now-defunct children's television channel Qubo on September 19, 2009, up until the network dropped it from its lineup on October 24, 2009. However, the series returned on September 28, 2010 as part of its "Night Owl" programming block, before being discontinued on March 31, 2012. Beginning early in 2014, YTV began airing reruns on weekdays. In 2014, the series was added onto the "Always On" digital platform of Cartoon Network in the United States. It was removed in 2015. In Canada, it also aired on Cartoon Network.

== Awards ==
Spliced won a Gemini Award in the category of "Best Writing in a Children's or Youth Program or Series" for the episode "Pink".
