= Unsealed World News =

American Evangelical Christian news organization and website

- Website type: News aggregation, News, blogging
- Available in: English
- Website: Unsealed.org & Unsealed.news
- Advertising: No
- Registration: No
- Launched: July 2010; 16 years ago United States
- Current status: Active
- Written in: JavaScript, CSS, HTML, jQuery

Unsealed World News is an American Evangelical Christian news organization and website that features world and Christian news. Unsealed was founded in 2010. All articles and stories are published in English and available freely (without subscription). It is headquartered in the United States and has a team of five journalists.

The primary website covers world news stories geared towards an Evangelical Christian audience of conservative persuasion and regularly publishes articles related to United States and international politics, Middle East issues, Christianity, the Bible, and Bible prophecy. Occasionally other topics including science and culture are covered. Like Drudge Report, Unsealed is a news aggregation website, but like traditional news organizations features significant original content and editorial pieces.

Its service provides freely accessible news, features, commentary and video updates to a global readership. Articles are often disseminated via user-submitted news aggregation sites such as Reddit, Digg, and Del.icio.us.

== Notoriety ==
Unsealed accused third-party U.S. presidential candidate Zoltan Istvan of being an "Antichrist Candidate," a claim to which Istvan responded.

In September 2016 a number of major publications including the Los Angeles Times, and AOL News reported that Unsealed was predicting that the end of the world would occur in August 2017 due to a solar eclipse, and the Revelation 12 sign prophecy. Unsealed responded to the accusations saying that they "actually believe the world will never end."
