= The Zimmer Twins =

Children's website and TV series

- Also known as: Zimmer Twins
- Created by: Jason Krogh; Aaron Leighton
- Country of origin: Canada
- Original languages: English; French
- No. of episodes: 106

Production
- Running time: 1-2 minutes
- Production company: Lost the Plot Productions

Original release
- Network: Teletoon (English); Télétoon (French)
- Release: May 23, 2005 – September 20, 2008

The Zimmer Twins was a Canadian animated series and website. The project was created by producer Jason Krogh and artist Aaron Leighton and is produced through Lost the Plot Productions Inc. A selection of the user-generated episodes is produced into broadcast shorts and air on Teletoon and in the US Qubo. Les Jumeaux Zimmer is the French-language version of the show and website.

The Zimmer Twins is known for its unique format which combines online participation and broadcast delivery. Children are invited to create and share 1-minute animated episodes using a story editor and library of animation. The audience creates endings to short, professionally produced story-starters. Kids tell their stories by choosing actions, characters, props and backgrounds. They can also add their own dialog and on-screen text. New clips are occasionally added.

The original Zimmer Twins website launched on March 14, 2005, with the show first airing on Teletoon in May. A total of 60 broadcast spots (30 English and 30 French) were produced and broadcast in the 2005/2006 season. By the end of the first season over 100,000 user-created episodes were created by over 50,000 registered members. A major revision of the site was launched July 1, 2006. A total of 120 broadcast episodes were broadcast in the 2006/2007 season and 32 more were broadcast in the 2007/2008 season. The site's population passed 200,000 on November 5, 2011.

In 2008, the online audience voted to select the three most popular user-generated movies. The winners' movies were incorporated into a half-hour awards show special which aired on September 26, 2008, in English and September 20, 2008, in French.

== Characters ==
=== Main characters ===
- Edgar Zimmer (voiced by Ben Head and Louis Grise) – The younger twin and Eva's brother. He is clumsy, out-of-date and unintelligent. He loves food and is good friends with 13. He has a superhero persona "Super Action Boy". He is originally voiced by Ben Head & Louis Grise.
- Eva Zimmer (voiced by Lauren Menzo and Jorah Dawson) – Edgar's older twin sister. Eva is intelligent, mature, and kind. She is annoyed by girls in her class who think she is a witch. She is talented in karate and other martial arts. She is also the leader of the Twins. She is originally voiced by Lauren Menzo & Jorah Dawson.
- 13 (voiced by Daniel Davies) – 13 is the twins' cat, with lime green eyes and a straight-line mouth. He can talk. He dislikes baths and is very fond of fish. 13 is anthropomorphic as he can do many things humans can, like playing the guitar or holding objects with his hands. He has an alter ego, Captain Furball. And on some real occasions, he seems to be antagonistic towards Eva. He is originally voiced by Daniel Davies.

=== Minor characters ===
- Delivery Boy – A delivery boy. He is a friend of the twins and delivers them their mail and packages.
- Madame Psycho (voiced by Kim Godfrey) – Madame Psycho (Mme Psycho for short) is a fortune-teller working at the Psychic Salon & Deli. She is caring, but is quick to lose her temper if people disobey her.

== List of Telepicks ==
=== Series 1 ===
Meow Mix of Doom

== Website ==
In March 2005, the Zimmer Twins websites were created with Australian, Canadian English, French, and International domains. Its users could make short-form clips out of a built-in video editor, which could be awarded as a Crowd Pleaser, Must-See, or as a Telepick. Telepicks would be aired on television and be dubbed by voice actors.

In July 2008, Telepicks were no longer attainable due to the Zimmer Twins no longer airing on TV stations.

In 2009, the Australian site was shut down, where only a year later, the Canadian English and French sites would also shut down.

In 2011, the Zimmer Twins announced a brand new website titled Zimmer Twins for Schools, a modified version of the website designed for education. Teachers could create accounts for their students and monitor activity, as well as create announcements.

In 2012, the Zimmer Twins website received a major redesign.

On August 1, 2020, JCee, a site editor for the Zimmer Twins website, announced that the Zimmer Twins and Zimmer Twins at School websites were going to be shut down due to lack of funding and the exportation of Adobe Flash. The websites were properly shut down on August 10, before being taken offline entirely in late November. These websites were the last remaining websites for the franchise. However, some members of the Zimmer Twins community have attempted to create projects to restore the website and bring archives of movies. In February 2021, all telepicks and favotoons that were aired were archived and uploaded onto YouTube.

== Credits ==
Role	Crew/Cast
Producer - Television	Anne-Sophie Brieger
Creative Lead	Aaron Leighton
Interactive Designer	Luke Lutman
Server Programmer	James Walker; Ashok Modi
Flash Programmer	John Park
Lead Animator	Les Solis
Animator	Lou Solis
Wordsmith	Mireille Messier
Audio and Video Editor	Kyle Sim

== Awards ==
- Webby Award Nomination, Youth Website (2006)
- Banff World Television Festival Nomination, Interactive Television (2006)
- Horizon Interactive Awards Silver, Education (2006)
- HOW Design Annual Outstanding Achievement (2007)
- The Alliance for Children and Television Awards of Excellent, Best Website or Original New-Platform Content Tied Into a Children's Program (2007)
- South by Southwest Interactive Awards Nomination, Education (2007)
- International Interactive Emmy Awards Winner Cannes, Interactive Program (2007)
