= Bellum Entertainment Group =

American television production and distribution company

Bellum Entertainment
- Type: Private Limited liability company
- Industry: Television
- Founded: 2004
- Defunct: 2017
- Fate: Assets dissolved in bankruptcy
- Headquarters: Burbank, California, United States
- Areas served: International
- Key people: Mary Carole McDonnell (founder)
- Products: Television production and distribution
- Number of employees: 11–50 (2013)

Bellum Entertainment Group, formerly known as LongNeedle Entertainment, was a Burbank, California based television production and distribution company. Bellum developed, produced, and distributed TV projects for broadcast, cable, digital, and ancillary markets. Bellum Entertainment began creating E/I programs in 2004 with the release of Animal Atlas. In 2012, Bellum entered into a deal with Tribune Broadcasting to license a two hour E/I program block and two-weekend series, Unsealed Alien Files and Unsealed Conspiracy Files.

The company was sued for wage theft and the founder alleged to have concocted a number of financial scams.

== Main productions at company's closing ==
- Animal Atlas was produced by Longneedle Entertainment, LLC, a subsidiary of Bellum Entertainment Group. First airing in 2004, Animal Atlas was an educational wildlife show in which young viewers meet animals from across the world. It is internationally distributed by Cisneros Media Distribution.
- Coolest Places On Earth was a broadcast syndicated program that aired in the United States from 2013 to 2017. The program featured cities, festivals, landmarks and natural wonders, showcasing each location's history and culture. The program is distributed internationally by Electus.
- Corrupt Crimes premiered on September 7, 2015, in national broadcast syndication. Bellum partnered with the Sinclair Broadcast Group to air the show domestically on Sinclair stations. The series investigated one or more recent crime stories, with expert analysis and dramatic storytelling. Corrupt Crimes launched season two nationally syndicated covering over 86% of the U.S. television market on September 12, 2016. International distribution was managed by Sky Vision.
- Deep Undercover premiered in the United States on October 5, 2016, on Escape. The series was a co-production with Televisa and was distributed in Germany, Austria, and Switzerland by ZDF Enterprises. Deep Undercover was a true crimes series from writer and producer Joseph D. Pistone. Each episode told the story of a different undercover operation from the point of view of the undercover officers involved.
- Murderous Affairs premiered on October 5, 2016, in the United States on Escape. The fifty-two episode series explored love affairs gone wrong and spouses driven to kill. Murderous Affairs is distributed internationally by IM Global.
- On the Spot was a weekly syndicated trivia show that asks questions from different categories including people, sports, music, health, food, technology, history, science, arts and entertainment, and culture. The show first aired nationally on September 25, 2011.
- Zoo Clues was a 30-minute educational and informative (E/I) program that answers questions about the animal kingdom, such as: "Can birds fly backwards?," "Are whales fish?," and "Do dogs sweat?" Questions and clues are presented, giving viewers a chance to guess the right answers.

== Previously produced shows ==
- Unsealed Alien and Conspiracy Files was a nationally syndicated program that debuted in September 2012. Unsealed: Alien Files was a 30-minute program that investigated recently released government documents regarding alien and UFO encounters, made accessible to the public in 2011 by the Freedom of Information Act. Based on the information, Unsealed Alien Files re-examined key evidence and followed developing leads to investigate mass UFO sightings, personal abductions, government cover-ups, and breaking alien news from around the world. Unsealed: Conspiracy Files investigated the previously top-secret files made public by the Freedom of Information Act. The show re-examined faulty assumptions, searches for inconsistencies, and explored new leads.
- State to State was a broadcast syndicated program set to release for the 2014-2015 season. State to State traveled across America.
- Safari Tracks was a 30-minute educational wildlife show focusing on African wildlife, comprising 52 episodes and produced in standard definition. Hosted by Benjamin Brown as the South African zoological protector and expert "Ushaka", the program takes viewers on an African safari each episode. It aired on Bounce TV, Antenna TV, Qubo, Smile of a Child TV, and international markets.
- Wildlife Jams was a half-hour E/I television program focusing on how animals behave and promote awareness and responsibility toward wildlife issues with the accompaniment of jazz music.
- Family Style with Chef Jeff was a nationally syndicated show in the U.S. for the 2013-2014 season. Family Style featured Chef Jeff Henderson who demonstrated how good choices in the kitchen can lead to a life-changing experience for the whole family. Family Style with Chef Jeff aired on Bounce TV and international markets.
- Now Eat This with Rocco DiSpirito was a nationally syndicated program that debuted on September 15, 2012, starring celebrity chef Rocco DiSpirito. Each episode focused on an individual or family’s food issues and health.
- Bellum Entertainment partnered with ITV Studios and Raycom Media to produce and distribute America Now, a news and lifestyle syndicated strip hosted by Leeza Gibbons and Bill Rancic. America Now was broadcast across the United States from 2010-2014 on stations owned by Raycom Media and was airing via syndication in other markets around the country.
- Fix It and Finish It was a nationally syndicated program that debuted on September 7, 2014, starring model and soap star Antonio Sabato, Jr. Sabato Jr. traveled across America and, at each city, partnered with local designers and contractors to renovate a bedroom, family room, kitchen, or outdoor space.
- Flip My Food with Chef Jeff was a nationally syndicated program that debuted on September 7, 2014, starring Chef Jeff Henderson. Chef Jeff traveled across the country to flip classic recipes into a healthier dish.

== Distribution ==
Bellum Entertainment distributed six first-run syndicated series to local broadcast television stations, as well as to pay, cable, broadcast networks, and subscription video-on-demand platforms in the United States. Bellum Entertainment's catalog contained thirty-nine titles and 2,067 episodes. Bellum partnered with international distributors including Electus, Red Arrow, IM Global, Cisneros Media Distribution, and Cineflix to distribute programs to territories worldwide. In September 2008, LongNeedle partnered with home entertainment distributor NCircle Entertainment to distribute their programming to home media, including traditional disc media and streaming services such as Amazon Prime Video.

== Unresolved financial issues ==
In 2017, Bellum began to be investigated by the United States Department of Labor for misclassifying workers as independent contractors rather than employees. Robert Lindsey, a DOL investigator, stated that Bellum was being investigated for missed and/or late payrolls. Bellum had wage claims filed against them by over 50 workers as of August 2017. Many of the cases are currently pending, and possible criminal charges are being considered by the state. Several employees who have won small claims suits over wage theft remain unpaid. Bellum also owes numerous companies unpaid money and as a result has been blacklisted from various distributors from consideration of production deals. It owes one company, Launchpad Entertainment, LLC over $275,000 in unpaid footage license fees that it used in programs.

A legal notice published in the July 19, 2019, issue of The Hollywood Reporter indicates Bellum's library assets would be publicly auctioned by The Credit Junction (acting as the secured party) beginning July 22, 2019, before the actual auction occurs on August 15 at the office of a Santa Monica attorney. The auction would have been called off if Bellum secured their library for a payment of $10 million; it is unknown if they were able to do so.

The founder was still being sought in 2025 and believed to be running other scams from Dubai.

== See also ==
- Mary Carole McDonnell bank fraud case
