= On the Spot (2011 TV series) =

- Genre: Trivia
- Written by: Jen Skelly
- Directed by: Peter McDonnell
- Narrated by: Pete Sepenuk
- Country of origin: United States
- Original language: English
- No. of seasons: 4
- No. of episodes: 33

Production
- Executive producer: Peter McDonnell
- Editor: Matt Fisher
- Running time: 22 minutes
- Production company: Bellum Entertainment Group

Original release
- Network: First-run syndication
- Release: September 18, 2011 – 2017

On the Spot is an American weekly syndicated television series that debuted in September 2011. The series is produced and distributed by Bellum Entertainment Group.

== Synopsis ==
On the Spot is a weekly syndicated trivia show that asks entertaining questions from different categories including untold history, globetrotting, origins, supernatural, in sickness and in health, myths, now and then, record setters, mad science and bad ideas. Example questions include:

Can a cow have an accent?

What came first, the color orange or the fruit?

As a kid, did Napoleon hate the French?

Was the name Google an accident?

Who got the world's longest standing ovation?

The show first aired nationally on September 18, 2011. The first 13 episodes were hosted by Eric Schwartz and included man-on-the-street segments where everyday people were asked the trivia questions (and many got the answers wrong), which led to each question being answered and explained. Later episodes had only unseen narrator Pete Sepenuk.

== Episode Guide ==
=== Season 1 ===
On The Spot premiered its first season in 2011 and aired across 90% of the United States.

Episode Number	Episode Name	About
101	History, Transportation, Astronomy	From Columbus to Ponce de Leon, the horse to horsepower, and Galileo to the order of the planets.
102	Animals, Geography of North America, Math	From insects to polar bears, the Great Lakes to the Not So Great Lakes, and the Pythagorean Theorem to endless Pi.
103	Money, Plans, World Geography	From dollar bills to financial abbreviations, fruits to chromosomes, and a new ocean to a globe gone south.
104	Government, Sports, Music	From presidents to the Supreme Court, the first Olympics to Jackie Robinson, and orchestras to air guitar.
105	Climate, Language, Health	From the last ice age to the hottest place on Earth, an antonym for antonym to a metaphor, and calories to the secret about stretching.
106	Inventors, Agriculture, Mythology	From the light bulb to the internet, livestock to the real cash crop, and Zeus to the Minotaur.
107	Explorers, Culture, Economics	From the South Pole to the moon, slurping soup to feng shui, and purchasing power to monopoly.
108	Human Skeleton, Visual Art, American History	From your head to your phalanges, Van Gogh to the rainbow, and the American Revolution to the industrial one.
109	Natural History Early Technologies, Food Science	From sabertooth cats to America's first people, the history of pencils to the history of knives, and why popcorn pops and we have only five tastes.
110	Civil War, Business, Weather	From Lincoln to Lee, CEO's to the S&P, and tornados to the speed of lightning.
111	U.S. Presidents, Chemistry, Performing Arts	From Obama and Reagan, hot air to hydrogen, and Chaplin to Buster Keaton.
112	Medieval Times, Astronomy, Energy	From the Crusades to catapults, Earth's rotation to Jupiter's moons, and OPEC to windmills.
113	U.S. Capitals, Oceans, Dinosaurs	From the smallest capital to the highest, the Great Barrier Reef to volcanoes, and T-Rex to ancient birds.
114	Sports, Geography, Science	From the first Olympic gold to the oldest Olympic athlete, the longest geographical name to countries within countries, and the brains of geniuses to animals with accents.
115	Health, Food, History	From your number one fear to hiccups, the history of the baker's dozen to the origin of orange, and blitzkriegs to "bless your."
116	Science, People, Animals	From the foundation of the universe to a jiffy, spies who become leaders to Nobel Prizes, and speedy hippos to weird pets.
117	Technology, Travel, Music	From the first photograph to the creation of the Internet, the wonders of the world to death by lightning, and platinum albums to 5-year old composers.
118	Geography, Culture, History	From the first Academy Awards to the easternmost state, pirates to the discovery of Antarctica, and unfurnished German apartments to politely sticking out your tongue.
119	Health, History, Science	The happiest country; the word "robot"; predictions.
120	Animals, History, People	From naked mole rats to the animals of 1492, the real reason it's called America to Civil War surgeries, and Charles Lindbergh to Jackie Robinson.
121	Geography, Science, Health	From the reason North is up to the fight over the number of oceans, the history of climate change to the truth about vegetables, and the skinny on stretching to the medical benefit of hugs.
122	Science, History, the Arts	From the reason cheese tastes good to the air pressure on Everest, the first pencil to the poleaxe, and Harry Houdini to Charlie Chaplin.

=== Season Two ===
The second season of On The Spot debuted September 16, 2012 and is currently airing across 91% of the United States.

Episode Number	Episode Name	About
201	What It's Worth, Problem & Solution, Globetrotting	From the value of a first edition of the Bible to a 1943 penny, the breakfast food that can kill ants to the food you can use to shave, remove make up, and polish your shoes, and the world's most dangerous pool to its most dangerous beach.
202	Mad Science, Myths, Who Said That?	From a headless chicken to Martian radio signals, the truth about alligators in sewers to the man-made objects you can see from outer space, and what Juliet really means when she asks "wherefore art thou Romeo" to the real origin of the phrase, "Elementary, my dear Watson."
203	Supernatural, In Sickness & In Health, Record Breakers	From Roswell to alien radio signals, how to tame claustrophobia to that bacterial laden piece of technology in your pocket, and records broken in surfing, cookies, hula hoops, and fishing, to the hilarious story of how the Guinness Book of Records got started.
204	What's In a Name, Now and Then, On the Menu	From the origin of the words "trivia" and "sideburn," to how Vegas, the Grand Canyon, and Earth itself have changed, to unusual foods such as poutine, blood pudding, and "toad in the hole" to the Museum of Burnt Food.
205	Untold History, Get Creative, Origins	From cannibalism to the jobs dictators had before they were dictators, to the Golden Age of Television and the "armonica" instrument, to the origins of the Pony Express, wedding gowns, candy canes, and gift shops.
206	What Could Have Been, Conspiracies, Identify This	From the wrong turn that started World War I and how the Titanic disaster could have been averted, to code cracking and a $2 million car, to braving Niagara Falls in a barrel and the world's biggest Ferris wheel.
207	Bad Ideas, Oddities, Mad Science	From plane crashes in Beverly Hills and airbag underwear, to teenage popes and wild Arizona camels, to the doctor who tested catheters on himself and superhero mice.
208	Record Breakers, What It's Worth, In Sickness & In Health	From breaking the sound barrier on land and in the air, to selling the Eiffel Tower and the price of some very famous dentures, to working out in zero gravity and the astounding weight of all the bacteria in your body.
209	Problem & Solution, Who Said That?, Supernatural	From the home remedy for itches to the best solutions for missing recipe ingredients, to famous quotes from comedians, politicians, writers, and actors, to the secret behind crop circles, Bigfoot, and the Loch Ness monster.
210	What's In a Name?, Now and Then, Myths	From the history of French Fries and fast food, to whether or not cell phones can pop popcorn, cause fires, and disorient planes, to the truth about ninjas, Viking warriors, and Billy the Kid.
211	Untold History, Globetrotting, Oddities	From gladiators to an amazing escape, the world's shortest war to its longest, to the amazing sights off Route 66, zorbing, graveyards, and a petrified giant.
212	What Could Have Been, Get Creative, Identify This	From crazy ideas for exploring space to the amazing plan for an unsinkable aircraft carrier, the surprising uses for goat's milk and spider webs, to hybrid animals, animals that can paint, and the most extreme close-ups of everyday things.
213	Origins, Supernatural, Bad Ideas	From the first hot air balloons and submarines to the common origin of many car companies, to the time travel, superheroes, mermaids, geniuses, and immortality, to three-wheeled cars, flying cars, and the brave first test of a flight suit.
214	Mad Science, Myths, Claim to Fame	From the science behind invisibility to what's really behind sightings of zombies and vampires, to the mummy's curse, presidential claims to fame, and the world's most amazing streets.
