= Animal Atlas =

American television series

- Genre: Educational; Animals
- Composer: Dana Kaproff
- Country of origin: United States
- Original language: English
- No. of seasons: 11
- No. of episodes: 286

Production
- Executive producer: Peter McDonnell
- Running time: 22 minutes
- Production companies: Midori Entertainment; Bellum Entertainment Group (seasons 2-11); Ten Chimneys Entertainment (season 1); Believe Entertainment (seasons 1-2); SJ2 Entertainment (season 3)

Original release
- Network: Syndicated
- Release: September 24, 2004 – July 13, 2015

Animal Atlas is a half-hour educational wildlife television series that "takes viewers on a tour of discovery, to learn the secrets of how animals live. From the diverse creatures of the African savanna, to the finned and the flippered of the big deep, to the colorful cast of the equatorial rainforest." The series is produced by Midori Entertainment and Longneedle Entertainment, LLC, a subsidiary of Bellum Entertainment Group. It premiered in national syndication in 2004. As of 2018, 286 episodes had been produced, all in high-definition. Hearst Television's "Go Time!" program block broadcasts Animal Atlas to independent television stations across America.

A Spanish dub of the series, re-titled Reino Animal premiered on Telefutura in September 2005.

== Home video ==
In September 2008, LongNeedle partnered with home entertainment distributor NCircle Entertainment to release Animal Atlas on DVD and distribute the show online, with fourteen titles released by NCircle. The first DVD, Animal Passport, was released in December 2008. Fourteen Animal Atlas home entertainment titles have been released, including Puppy Party, Animal ABC's, Family Time, Kitten Party, and Monkeying Around. The most recent release was Pet Party, in October 2012.
