= Unsealed Alien Files =

- Genre: Entertainment, Mystery
- Created by: Colet Abedi
- Developed by: Colet Abedi
- Narrated by: John B. Wells
- Country of origin: United States
- Original language: English
- No. of seasons: 4
- No. of episodes: 82

Production
- Executive producer: Colet Abedi
- Producer: Bellum Entertainment Group
- Camera setup: Multiple
- Running time: 19 mins
- Production company: Bellum Entertainment Group

Original release
- Network: History
- Release: 2011 – 2015

Unsealed Alien Files is an American television series that premiered in 2011 in broadcast syndication in the United States.

== Premise ==
Unsealed: Alien Files investigates released documents regarding UFO encounters, made accessible to the public in 2011 by the Freedom of Information Act. Each episode examines alien cases such as mass reports of UFO sightings, reports of personal abduction, purported government cover-ups, and related news from around the world.

== See also ==
- List of topics characterized as pseudoscience
- Hangar 1: The UFO Files
- UFO Files
- UFO Hunters
- UFOs Declassified
