= Alex Ferrer =

American television personality and lawyer (born 1960)

- Born: Alejandro Enrique Ferrer; October 18, 1960 (age 65); Havana, Cuba
- Education: Barry University (BA); University of Miami (JD)
- Occupations: Judge, law professor, television personality
- Spouse: Jane Ferrer
- Children: 2

Alejandro Enrique Ferrer (born October 18, 1960), known professionally as Judge Alex, is an American television personality, lawyer, and retired judge who presided as the arbitrator on the eponymous Judge Alex.

== Early life and education ==
Ferrer was born in Havana, Cuba in 1960 and immigrated to the United States with his family when he was one year old. He attended Rockway Junior High School.

While working as a police officer, Ferrer received a Bachelor of Professional Studies degree from Barry University. Ferrer earned a J.D. from the University of Miami, where he became a published member of its law review. Ferrer also served as judicial director of the university's alumni association.

== Career ==
At 19, Ferrer served as a young police officer in Florida. Ferrer practiced law in Miami, focusing on civil litigation, including suits involving medical malpractice, wrongful deaths, personal injuries and commercial business litigation.

=== Judicial ===
In 1995, he became an associate administrative judge in the criminal division of the 11th judicial circuit, which covers Miami-Dade County, where he spent ten years presiding over criminal cases. He also served as an appellate judge over appeals from the Miami-Dade County Court, county commission and other agencies.

In 1999, he was elected to serve as district representative to the executive committee of the Conference of Circuit Court Judges, a position he held until 2001. He is a member of the Florida Bar and the District of Columbia Bar Association. He has been an adjunct professor at Florida International University and taught media relations to other judges at The New Judges College and The College of Advanced Judicial Studies, as well as at various national conferences.

As the child of Cuban immigrants, Ferrer is fully bilingual.

== Roles in Sun Gym Gang trials ==
=== Sun Gym Gang murder trials ===
Judge Alex presided over the trials of Sun Gym gang members Daniel Lugo and Adrian Doorbal.

On July 17, 1998, Ferrer sentenced both to death for each of the murders of Frank Griga and Krisztina Furton, as well as two prison terms for other crimes.

=== Marc Schiller's Medicare fraud trial ===
The judge provided favorable testimony in February 1999 to Marc Schiller, the Sun Gym gang's first victim. Before Schiller's abduction and attempted murder, he had led a Medicare fraud scheme and was facing 25 years in jail. Ferrer stepped in to provide testimony as a sitting judge, which is extremely rare and set precedent in its own right. He credited Schiller's courage and the conditions he faced in helping prosecute Lugo and Doorbal. Schiller's sentence was reduced to the federal minimum of 46 months in prison.

== Preston v. Ferrer ==
In 2005, Ferrer was presented with a demand for arbitration by attorney Arnold Preston, who worked for Ferrer under a "personal management" contract. Preston claimed Ferrer owed him fees under the contract. Ferrer countered, claiming Preston had acted as a talent agent without a license and therefore under California law the contract was void and unenforceable. The question of whether a judge or an arbitrator should decide the "talent agent" question went all the way to the United States Supreme Court in the case Preston v. Ferrer. The Court ruled in Preston's favor in 2008, holding that an arbitrator, rather than a state judge, should decide whether Preston violated California's talent agency act.

== Television appearances ==
Judge Alex is an American arbitration-based reality court show, presided over by Judge Alex Ferrer. The syndicated series debuted on September 12, 2005, and ran for nine seasons.

Judge Alex appeared on the January 27, 2007 episode of 1 vs. 100. On July 6, 2007, he appeared on Fox News Channel's Red Eye w/ Greg Gutfeld. He was a guest on Verdict with Dan Abrams on July 15, 2008. On November 17, 2008, he appeared on Trivial Pursuit: America Plays as the captain of America's team. On November 21, 2008, as a contestant playing for a charity during a special "Judges Week" program. Judge Alex appeared on an episode of America's Most Wanted (episode date March 22, 2010).

He appeared on Orlando, Florida's WOFL Fox 35 and the Fox News Channel as a legal expert during coverage of the Casey Anthony murder trial in 2011 and George Zimmerman murder trial in 2013.

In 2018, Ferrer began hosting an American true-crime television series called Whistleblower on the CBS television network.

== Personal life ==
Ferrer resides in the Miami area with his wife, Jane, their two children and their dog, Eevee.
