= Daniel Lugo =

Daniel Lugo may refer to:

- Daniel Lugo (actor) (born 1945), Puerto Rican actor
- Daniel Lugo (convict), central character in the movie Pain & Gain, played by Mark Wahlberg
