= TPAP =

TPAP can mean any of the following:

- Tetrapropylammonium perruthenate
- Trivial Pursuit: America Plays
- To Pimp A Butterfly (Kendrick Lamar album)
