= Broken Roads =

Broken Roads may refer to:

- Broken Roads (video game), a 2024 video game
- Broken Roads (film), a 2012 film
