= Rolonda =

American syndicated talk show (1994–1997)

- Genre: Talk show
- Presented by: Rolonda Watts
- Country of origin: United States
- Original language: English
- No. of seasons: 4
- No. of episodes: 1,100 +

Production
- Executive producers: Michael King; Roger King
- Production locations: Unitel Video, New York City
- Camera setup: Videotape; Multi-camera
- Running time: 1 hour (including commercials); 40 minutes (without commercials)
- Production companies: Watts Works Productions; King World

Original release
- Network: Syndicated
- Release: January 17, 1994 – May 18, 1997

Rolonda is an American first-run syndicated talk show that was hosted by Rolonda Watts. The show ran for four seasons from January 17, 1994, to May 18, 1997. It was produced by Watts Works Productions in association with King World Productions, and was also distributed by King World.

== Format ==
Rolonda is an hour-long daytime talk show that was hosted by television presenter Rolonda Watts.

== Broadcast history and release ==
The show premiered on January 17, 1994, as a replacement for The Les Brown Show.

== Production ==
=== Conception and development ===
The program served as a replacement in the majority of the markets carrying the show at launch for The Les Brown Show, a daytime talk show that debuted on September 6, 1993, and which went on hiatus in December 1993 due to low ratings, ending its run on January 14, 1994, the Friday before Rolonda's debut. Prior to hosting the show, Watts served as a senior correspondent and weekend anchor for the syndicated daytime newsmagazine series Inside Edition, which was also produced by King World.

=== Topic selection ===
The show featured celebrity interviews, such as with Tonya Harding.
