= Pain & Gain =

2013 American film by Michael Bay

- Theatrical release poster
- Directed by: Michael Bay
- Screenplay by: Christopher Markus; Stephen McFeely
- Based on: Pain & Gain by Pete Collins
- Produced by: Michael Bay; Ian Bryce; Donald De Line
- Starring: Mark Wahlberg; Dwayne Johnson; Anthony Mackie; Tony Shalhoub; Ed Harris
- Cinematography: Ben Seresin
- Edited by: Thomas A. Muldoon; Joel Negron
- Music by: Steve Jablonsky
- Production companies: Paramount Pictures; De Line Pictures; Bay Films
- Distributed by: Paramount Pictures
- Release dates: April 11, 2013 (Miami premiere); April 26, 2013 (United States)
- Running time: 129 minutes
- Country: United States
- Language: English
- Budget: $26 million
- Box office: $86.2 million

Pain & Gain is a 2013 American black comedy crime film directed by Michael Bay and written by Christopher Markus and Stephen McFeely. It is loosely based on a 1999 series of Miami New Times articles by Pete Collins about the activities of the Sun Gym gang, a group of bodybuilding ex-convicts convicted of kidnapping, extortion, torture, and murder in Miami in the mid-1990s. It stars Mark Wahlberg, Dwayne Johnson, and Anthony Mackie as members of the gang, with supporting roles played by Tony Shalhoub and Ed Harris. The title is a play on the fitness adage "no pain, no gain".

Pain & Gain premiered in Miami on April 11, 2013, before Paramount Pictures released it in theatres on April 26. The film received mixed reviews; it was praised for its script, direction, and performances, but criticized for its historical inaccuracies. A commercial success, it grossed $86 million worldwide against a $26 million production budget. Marc Schiller, the Sun Gym gang's primary victim who was depicted in the film as Victor Kershaw, sued the production company over his portrayal.

== Plot ==
In 1994, ex-con and bodybuilder Daniel Lugo is hired by Sun Gym owner John Mese as a manager. Daniel befriends trainer and bodybuilder Adrian Doorbal, who was recently rendered impotent from steroids. He envies the earnings and lifestyle of Victor Kershaw, a member he begins to train. Inspired to be a "doer" by motivational speaker/playboy Jonny Wu, Daniel plans to extort Victor for his assets. He recruits Adrian, who seeks financial resources to pay for erectile dysfunction treatment. He manipulates Paul Doyle, another ex-con and born again Christian struggling with drug use, into joining the plan. Paul, who had been staying at a church after leaving prison, assaults the priest at the church for making homosexual advances on him and becomes more intertwined with the gang.

The "Sun Gym gang" kidnaps Victor, taking him to a small warehouse. Although Victor identifies Daniel, the scheme proceeds as planned. Under duress, Victor makes calls to provide explanations for his disappearance and transfers his assets to Daniel. Mese is bribed to notarize documents in Victor's absence. After collecting Victor's money and assets, the gang attempts to kill Victor. They stage a drunk driving crash, burn his car, then run him over.

Unbeknownst to the gang, Victor survived and is hospitalized. He informs the police, who dismiss his story because of Victor's manner, blood alcohol level and his being from Colombia, a South American country known for drug trafficking. Victor contacts Ed Du Bois, III, a semi-retired private investigator, who warns Victor to leave the hospital. Victor takes his advice just as the gang arrives and hides in a cheap motel.

The gang members spoil themselves with Victor's riches. Daniel takes over Victor's car and home and begins integrating himself with Victor's neighbors; Adrian marries Robin, the nurse treating his impotence; Paul abandons his sobriety, blowing his money on cocaine and Sorina, who is a stripper and Daniel's ex-girlfriend who believes he and Daniel work for the CIA.

Ed tails them and goes on to meet Daniel under the guise of a personal training client.

After Victor furiously calls Mese about his stolen money, the gang identifies the motel he stays at. They go to kill him, but discover that he has already checked out. They learn of Ed's link to Victor and plan to kidnap him, but the plan falls through.

Paul and Adrian, having gone broke after excessive spending, plan another kidnapping with Daniel. They target Frank Griga, owner of a phone sex operation. They lure Griga and his girlfriend Krisztina Furton to Adrian's to propose an investment scheme. The discussion breaks down when Griga points out that he distrusts Daniel and his friends due to their obvious lack of knowledge on running a business. During the ensuing fistfight, one of Adrian's weights falls on Griga's head, killing him; Adrian accidentally kills Krisztina by overdosing her with horse tranquilizer in the chaos.

They dismember the bodies and dispose of them in a swamp. Paul, perturbed by the violence Daniel promised would not happen, leaves the gang and returns to the priest's church. The police learn of Griga and Krisztina's disappearances and, with evidence from Ed, plan to arrest the Sun Gym gang.

The police arrest Paul at the church, Adrian at home, and Mese at the Sun Gym. Daniel flees in Victor's speedboat. Deducing his destination, the police, Ed, and Victor fly by helicopter to the bank in Nassau that Victor uses as an offshore account. Daniel slips away from the authorities, but gets run over by Victor and is finally arrested.

At the trial, Paul gives a full confession incriminating Adrian and Daniel. Robin, upon discovering her husband's criminal activities, divorces and also testifies against Adrian along with Sorina. Daniel and Adrian are sentenced to death, while Paul and Mese are sentenced to 15 years. Paul served 7 years and rededicated himself to Christianity while Mese died in prison.

== Cast ==
- Mark Wahlberg as Daniel Lugo
- Dwayne Johnson as Paul Doyle (based on Carl Weekes, Stevenson Pierre, and Jorge Delgado)
- Anthony Mackie as Adrian 'Noel' Doorbal
- Tony Shalhoub as Victor Kershaw (Marc Schiller)
- Ed Harris as Detective Ed Du Bois, III
- Rob Corddry as John Mese
- Rebel Wilson as Robin Peck (Cindy Eldridge)
- Ken Jeong as Jonny Wu (Tom Vu)
- Bar Paly as Sorina Luminita (Sabina Petrescu)
- Michael Rispoli as Frank Griga
- Keili Lefkovitz as Krisztina Furton
- Tony Plana as Captain Lopez
- Emily Rutherfurd as Carolyn "Cissy" DuBois
- Yolanthe Cabau as Analee Calvera
- Larry Hankin as Pastor Randy
- Peter Stormare as Dr. Bjornson
- Brian Stepanek as Brad MacCalister
- Patrick Bristow as Spy Shop Clerk
- Wladimir Klitschko as Client
- Kurt Angle as Prison Inmate #3 (uncredited)
- Jeff Chase as Prison Inmate #1 (uncredited)

== Comparisons between the film and actual events ==
Multiple media properties compare and contrast details shown in the film versus actual events. History v. Hollywood also shows the headshot photograph, name, birthdate, and birthplace of the principals in a "Reel Face" v. "Real Face" lineup. As David Haglund and Forrest Wickman wrote in Slate's culture blog, Browbeat: "the film more or less adheres to a very rough outline provided by the novella-length, three-part, highly detailed series written by Pete Collins and published in the Miami New Times over a decade ago. Not surprisingly, many details, and a number of significant characters, are dropped from the movie. A lot of new, fictional detail – and one largely made-up character – takes its place. When the movie first tells us that it's a true story, we're seeing something that didn't happen. When we're told it's 'still a true story,' we're watching one invented character watch a semi-fictional character do something that sorta kinda took place."

The film portrayed the Sun Gym gang as consisting of three primary members: the Irish-American Daniel Lugo, African-American Adrian Noel Doorbal, and Samoan/African-American Paul Doyle; and two accomplices (John Mese, the Sun Gym owner and Miami Shores accountant who notarized Kershaw's — in reality, Marc Schiller's — documents for Lugo; and stripper Sorina Luminita — based on Sabina Petrescu — whom Lugo claimed to have recruited to serve as the gang's femme fatale). In reality, the gang was much larger, Daniel Lugo was of Puerto Rican descent, Noel Doorbal was a native of Trinidad, and Doyle's character is a composite of several real life individuals of different nationalities who were not depicted in the film, such as Carl Weekes, Jorge Delgado, and Stevenson Pierre. Additionally, Doorbal's real-life girlfriend (Cindy Eldridge) helped scrub blood off Doorbal's condominium walls after Doorbal had dismembered Griga and Furton's bodies. Unlike Sorina, who in the film Lugo passes on to Doyle, the real-life Sabina and Lugo remained together as a couple and became engaged, and they fled together to the Bahamas (with Lugo's parents). Additional real-life players in the events are detailed in the Miami New Times article, "Sidebar: Cast of Characters".

In the film, Victor Kershaw states he was born in Bogotá, Colombia. His real life counterpart, Marc Schiller, was born in Argentina. Schiller and Lugo did not befriend each other; Schiller actually distrusted Lugo. It was Delgado (who worked for Schiller, as did Delgado's wife) who befriended Lugo and targeted Schiller, and it was at Delgado's (not Schiller's) warehouse where the kidnappers held and tortured Schiller for a full month, while extorting him and before trying to kill him.

Sabina Elena Petrescu (portrayed onscreen by Bar Paly as Sorina Luminita), in addition to being a Solid Gold center stage stripper, was a Miss Romania finalist in 1990 and a former Penthouse model. Lugo really did convince Petrescu that he was a CIA operative, who was working to kidnap enemies of the U.S. government. In the film, a blindfolded Victor Kershaw recognized Lugo by his cologne. In reality, Marc Schiller recognized his voice.

The car with which the gang tried to kill Schiller, by crashing it (into a construction vehicle in the film; into a utility pole in reality) and then by setting Schiller and it ablaze, was a Toyota 4Runner, not a BMW. In contrast to the film, the gang did not secure Schiller's seat-belt before crashing the car, and Schiller did not survive the crash from inside the car; rather, Schiller bailed out of the car, rolling onto the ground, before it hit the pole. When crashing the car and setting Schiller ablaze failed, the real-life gang ran over Schiller's body twice, but with a Toyota Camry, not a van.

The movie portrays Paul Doyle as first running into a demeaning Frank Griga at a strip club where Luminita works. In reality, Doorbal first discovered Griga when Doorbal spotted a picture of a Lamborghini Diablo in a photo album belonging to his Hungarian stripper girlfriend, Beatriz Weiland (not portrayed in the film). He asked her who owned it. It turned out that Griga was one of Weiland's former generous boyfriends. It was she who introduced Griga to the gang. In reality, Frank Griga was also Hungarian and had a noticeable accent, which his on-screen portrayal lacks.

The gang did meet at Frank Griga's home as in the movie. In reality, they met three times; the final instance at Doorbal's Miami Lakes apartment, where the murders actually took place. In reality, Lugo did not kill Griga—Doorbal did, by first cracking the side of his head with a blunt object, then strangling him with a headlock, and finally injecting him with Rompun. Krisztina Furton ran to see what had happened, and screamed. Lugo covered her mouth and tackled her. She had no gun, contrary to the movie portrayal. She was bound, then Doorbal injected her with the drug. Overall, Doorbal injected her three separate times, instead of twice.

Miami New Times reporter Francisco Alvarado reports the facts associated with the power tools purchased by the gang, the cause of the chainsaw's failure, and the ensuing details, some of which differed from their film portrayal:

They bought a gas-powered chainsaw from Home Depot to cut off body parts but forgot to fill it with motor oil, so it broke the first time they cranked the power tool on. Lugo returned the chainsaw to Home Depot, demanding a refund. He left the home-improvement store with an electric Remington Power Cutter, which came with a one-year guarantee to 'handle all your cutting chores quickly and easily.' He went back to the warehouse and handed the chainsaw to Doorbal, who took charge of the grisly dismemberment. When the power tool's teeth got caught in Furton's hair, Doorbal had Lugo chop off her head with a hatchet. The two murderers then used a curved blade and pliers to remove the faces and teeth off the heads.

The movie depicted Lugo and Doorbal dumping the body parts in several barrels into a lake located somewhere in what appears to be the Everglades. In reality, Lugo, Doorbal, and "Little Mario" Gray dumped Griga and Furton's torsos-in-drums into a drainage ditch in southwest Miami.

Details in the scene in which Paul was shown incinerating the victims' severed hands on a barbecue grill (to remove the fingerprints) were changed; in reality, Lugo did the grilling, using a steel drum with an iron grate laid on top, not a barbecue grill. Lugo tossed Griga and Furton's hands, feet, and skull fragments onto the grate, doused them in gasoline, and began to grill. When Delgado returned to the warehouse, he yelled at Lugo, who reluctantly agreed to move his operation from in front of the warehouse to the rear alley.

In the film, Doyle robbed an armored truck and got his toe shot off while escaping. That sequence is entirely fictional; no member of the Sun Gym gang actually robbed an armored truck or had their toe shot off.

Robin Peck (Rebel Wilson's character), Doorbal's girlfriend, then wife, in the film, is based on Cindy Eldridge, who did refer Doorbal to a doctor. Contrary to events in the film, they did not meet at a medical office, they did not have a whirlwind courtship or marry at home, and Doorbal did not need to commit further crimes to fund his injections. Furthermore, Doorbal was violent and sadistic in real life, unlike Anthony Mackie's mild-mannered character in the movie.

=== Arrests ===
In the movie, the police arrest:

- Mese at the Sun Gym during a bodybuilding competition—In reality, the competition and arrest took place in Downtown Miami.
- Doyle at the church—Doyle's real composite counterparts were all arrested at home.

In the film, Lugo escapes in Kershaw's go-fast boat, and at Du Bois' house, Kershaw asserts that he owns a boat. In reality, Schiller did not own a boat. Only Griga owned a boat; it was a tall yacht christened Foreplay.

Near the end of the movie, Lugo is seen getting hit by a car driven by Kershaw in the Bahamas. This event did not happen. In reality, Lugo fled to the Bahamas with his fiancée and his parents, and neither Schiller nor the detective, Du Bois, was there during his capture. Instead, a multi-agency task force apprehended Lugo at the Hotel Montague in Nassau.

At the end of the movie, Doyle has an attack of conscience, confesses, and testifies against Lugo and Doorbal. Instead of the death penalty, he gets 15 years but serves only 7½. Carl Weekes, the religious and recurring drug-abuser part of Doyle's composite, drove the car that ran over Schiller and got 10 years for attempted murder; he served 7 years. Jorge Delgado, who actually testified against the rest of the gang, did so in order to avoid the death penalty.

In the film, Du Bois is portrayed as a retired police officer who takes over his "old man's detective agency" when he accepts Kershaw's case. In reality, Ed Du Bois III has been a licensed private investigator since 1960 and took over his father's agency in 1968. Du Bois continues in this capacity to this day.

The end credits of the film state that John Mese was sentenced to 15 years and died in prison. While he did die of a stroke in 2004, his sentence was actually 56 years.

Among the multiple major differences between the film and the real-life story, writer David Chen identifies the real-life gang member most like the character, Paul Doyle (played by Dwayne Johnson):

In reality, the third man in the Sun Gym Gang was a man named Carl Weekes, who most closely resembles the Paul Doyle character in the film — both are trying to make a new life in Miami, and both are born-again Christians. But Weekes is a weakling; Collins describes him as "a lightweight" who weighed only 140. Moreover, he's almost totally excluded from the later events in the story, in which sex mogul Frank Griga is killed.

=== Real-life outcomes ===
Francisco Alvarado's Miami New Times article, "Pain & Gain: Where the Real-Life Sun Gym Gang Characters Are Now" (April 4, 2013), details the actual crimes, the real-life gang members’ sentences, and the characters' post-trial experiences and current status.

Additionally, the Florida State Commission on Capital Cases publishes and regularly updates the trial summaries, court information, and information about the offenses, criminal sentences, and post-trial legal and prison developments for defendants. This information is cross-posted with that of the Florida Department of Corrections, Prison Offender Network, which posts regularly updated Inmate Population Information Detail and the Death Row Roster. Details from those sources pertinent to the Sun Gym gang are summarized below:

- Noel "Adrian" Doorbal (DC# M16320, DOB: December 21, 1971, Eleventh Judicial Circuit, Dade County Case # 95-17381-B); Sentenced to death July 17, 1998. Currently incarcerated in Florida State Prison, In December 2024, Doorbal was re-sentenced to life in prison.
- Daniel Lugo (DC #M16321, DOB: June 4, 1963, Eleventh Judicial Circuit, Dade County, Case# 95-17381C); Sentenced to death July 17, 1998. Currently incarcerated in Florida State Prison, In December 2024, Lugo was re-sentenced to life in prison.
- John Mese (DC# M15699): "Mese was indicted on October 2, 1996 (Case# 95-17381-F) for the kidnapping, extortion, and murders of Griga and Furton and the kidnapping and extortion of Marc Schiller. A jury returned guilty verdicts on all counts of the indictment; however, the judge set aside the convictions pertaining to the Griga/Furton crimes. On July 20, 1998, Mese was sentenced to 56 years imprisonment for the kidnapping and extortion of Schiller. Mese appealed and the State cross-appealed the sentence to the Florida District Court of Appeal, Third District. On 06/19/02, the DCA ruled that the trial judge improperly set aside the two RICO convictions and ordered a new sentencing hearing to be conducted on those counts. On January 15, 2003, Mese was sentenced to 30 years' imprisonment for one count of Conspiracy to Commit Racketeering. In 2004, Mese died in prison from a stroke."
- John Raimondo (DC# 198195): "Raimondo was indicted on October 2, 1996 (Case# 95-17381-I) on one count each of Conspiracy to Commit Racketeering, First-Degree Murder (Furton), Kidnapping (Furton), and Attempted Extortion. The State declined to prosecute all but the kidnapping charge, and Raimondo was convicted and sentenced to eight years imprisonment for the crime." He was released in 2002.
- Jorge Delgado (DC# 198219): "In return for testifying for the State, Delgado was sentenced to two prison terms of 15 and 5 years for his role in the murders of Griga and Furton and the attempted murder of Schiller."

Though the Kershaw character is depicted as socially pretentious and pompous, there is nothing to indicate his wealth derived from anything other than legitimate sources. In real life, immediately after testifying against the Sun Gym gang, Marc Schiller, on whom Kershaw is based, was arrested and charged with operating a $14 million fraudulent Medicare scheme. Facing 25 years in federal prison, Schiller was aided by the sitting trial judge of the criminal case against the Sun Gym gang who testified on his behalf. In 1999 Schiller was offered and accepted a plea deal for the statutory minimum of 46 months and was released from prison in 2001.

== Production ==
Michael Bay first announced the film after the release of Transformers: Revenge of the Fallen (2009). Bay stated he wanted to do Pain & Gain between the second and third Transformers films. The project was put on hold when Paramount Pictures gave the third film, Transformers: Dark of the Moon, a 2011 release date.

On February 13, 2012, it was confirmed that the budget for the film would be funded by Paramount as part of a two-picture deal with Bay. The budget was set at $35 million, the lowest of any film Bay has directed since his first feature film Bad Boys (1995). Bay, Dwayne Johnson, and Mark Wahlberg did not take salaries, instead signing on in exchange for back ends on the film's profits. Bay later confirmed that production would begin in Miami the following April, stating: "I'm extremely excited to simplify my film career this spring with a great character piece." On February 17, reports surfaced that Ed Harris had officially joined the cast and Rob Corddry was rumored to play John Mese, a former competitive bodybuilder who now owns the gym where Wahlberg's character works as a personal trainer. On February 23, it was confirmed that Anthony Mackie had joined the cast as "a bodybuilder and workout partner of Wahlberg's character Adrian Doorbal, who has little to show for his time in the gym and decides to get involved with the twisted plan."

On February 28, 2012, it was reported that Bar Paly and Tony Shalhoub had joined the cast. Paly is cast as "an illegal immigrant and former beauty queen who dreams of becoming the next Marilyn Monroe. Wahlberg's character promises to make her a star, and she in turn agrees to do whatever he asks in the service of her new country." Shalhoub's role in the film is that of "Marc Schiller, the target of the kidnapping scheme." On March 5, it was reported that Scott Rosenberg was brought on board to punch up the script. Rosenberg had worked with Bay previously on Armageddon (1998). In a statement on March 7, Bay reported the budget was $22 million and said he was taking director's scale for the film. In an interview with The New York Times that April, Bay later stated the budget was an estimated $26 million.

On March 27, 2012, Rebel Wilson joined the cast as Robin Peck, and principal photography began in Miami on March 31. That April, Dutch actress Yolanthe Sneijder-Cabau joined the cast as Wahlberg's character's object of desire. On April 5, Ken Jeong joined the cast as a character named Jonny Wu. The official trailer for the film was released on December 19.

Steve Jablonsky, who worked on Bay's previous films, composed the film score. The soundtrack was released on Varese Sarabande.

== Release ==
=== Home media ===
In the United States, Pain & Gain was released by Paramount Home Media Distribution on digital formats such as iTunes and UltraViolet on August 13, 2013, and Blu-ray and DVD on August 27, 2013, earning a profit of $17,296,504 on DVD and Blu-Ray.

== Reception ==
=== Critical response ===
Rotten Tomatoes reports that 49% of 199 critics gave Pain & Gain a positive review, with an average rating of 5.4/10. The site's critics consensus reads, "It may be his most thought-provoking film to date, but Michael Bay's Pain & Gain ultimately loses its satirical edge in a stylized flurry of violent spectacle." Metacritic gave the film a weighted average score of 45 out of 100 based on 42 critics, indicating "mixed or average reviews". Audiences surveyed by Cinemascore gave the film an average grade of "C+" on an A+ to F scale.

British critic Mark Kermode described the film as "grotesquely inappropriate" and "every bit as pumped up and steroidal as the appalling characters it is attempting to portray". Scott Foundas of Variety wrote "the violence mostly lands with a sickening thud, which is fitting, one supposes, but also ultimately numbing." Writing for The Observer, Philip French said he "rather enjoyed" the violent black comedy, with particular praise for Ed Harris. Referring to the movie as "a Bay botch job", Rolling Stone gave the film 1/2 star out of 4, noting: "[Bay] once claimed he wanted to make a small, personal film that would reveal the real Bay. And, I'm here to report, that Pain and Gain is that film. It's dumb, shallow, deeply cynical and creatively bereft." Simon Abrams of RogerEbert.com gave the film 2.5 out of 4 stars, calling it "as ambitious and vibrant as it is ugly and scattershot". Andrew O'Hehir of Salon found the film "cruel but funny", adding, "Michael Bay sends a clear message to those of us who've been making fun of him: He's been in on the joke the whole time."

=== Subjects and law enforcement response ===
The Associated Press published an article interviewing survivors and investigators of the Sun Gym gang. Miami-Dade Police Sgt. Felix Jimenez stated: "You are talking about real people. And in this particular case, especially when you're talking about the murder victims, these were innocent victims." Zsuzsanna Griga, whose brother and brother's girlfriend the gang killed and dismembered, said she did not want the American public to sympathize with the killers.

David Haglund and Forrest Wickman of Slate wrote, in a post titled "How True Is Pain & Gain?": "In addition to the usual Hollywood streamlining and the amping up of certain scenes, the changes seem largely designed to make the central criminals more sympathetic. Whether you think that's a respectable thing to do will depend on what you think of their actual story – and perhaps, of the movies in general."

John Raimondo, who helped dispose of the victims' bodies and was released from prison in 2002, told the Miami New Times that he refused to watch the film out of respect for the affected families, while claiming certain details in the initial reporting were inaccurate and based on erroneous testimony by Jorge Delgado.

==== Marc Schiller defamation lawsuit ====
In April 2014, Marc Schiller (named Victor Kershaw in the film) filed a defamation lawsuit in the Southern District of New York against the producers of the film. Schiller claimed the film portrayed him as an "unlikeable, sleazy, rude, abrasive braggart, who committed dishonest and illegal acts, used alcohol and drugs, was deprecating towards homosexuals, women, foreigners and others, and who was verbally abusive to his employees." while his assailants were "[portrayed] as nice guys who were just bumbling fools."

In June 2015, the lawsuit was moved to the Southern District of Florida.

In April 2016, Schiller settled with the producers for an undisclosed sum.

== In popular culture ==
- Writer Pete Collins parlayed his three-part Miami New Times article series, that inspired the film, into a consultancy for the film's screenwriting team, a book titled Pain & Gain – This Is a True Story (2013), multiple post-film articles (such as those in Miami New Times), and media appearances.

== Works cited ==
The original Miami New Times articles by Pete Collins (Referred to collectively, in the references, as "the articles in question")

- "Pain & Gain, Part 1" – December 23, 1999
- "Pain & Gain, Part 2" – December 30, 1999
- "Pain & Gain, Part 3" – January 6, 2000
