= Temptation (2007 American game show) =

- Genre: Game show
- Presented by: Rossi Morreale
- Announcer: Rolonda Watts
- Country of origin: United States
- Original language: English
- No. of seasons: 1
- No. of episodes: 170

Production
- Executive producer: Ginger Simpson
- Production locations: Los Angeles, California
- Running time: 20 minutes
- Production companies: FremantleMedia North America; 20th Television

Original release
- Network: Syndicated
- Release: September 10, 2007 – May 23, 2008

Related
- Sale of the Century (1969–1974, 1983–1989)

Temptation: The New Sale of the Century is an American syndicated television game show based on both the original Australian and American Sale of the Century versions, and modelled after the 2005 Australian version, also titled Temptation. The show began airing in syndication on September 10, 2007, with the last first-run episode airing on May 23, 2008. Reruns continued until September 5, 2008.

The series was hosted by Rossi Morreale with former talk show host Rolonda Watts as announcer. Temptation was produced by FremantleMedia North America (logoed as FremantleMedia) and 20th Century Fox Television but was syndicated by 20th Television.

As with other syndicated half-hour programs, Temptation aired two episodes in some markets, with the second episode with a later production date. In July 2008, Temptation was canceled due to low ratings (it was the lowest among game shows during the 2007–2008 season) and replaced by Trivial Pursuit: America Plays on most stations.

== Front Game ==
The game was played in two rounds, each containing several parts. Three contestants, one a returning champion, each started the game with 20 "Temptation dollars".

=== Round 1 ===
This round was broken down into three parts: a "Speed Round", an "Instant Bargain", and a "Fame Game":

- Speed Round: Morreale asked a series of rapid-fire pop culture questions over 30 seconds (instead of 60 as in the '80s series); correct answers were worth $5 while incorrect responses lost $5.
- Instant Bargain: The leader after the initial speed round was offered a chance to spend some of his/her "Temptation dollars" to purchase a prize at a discount. Played just like the original Sale of the Century Instant Bargains, the host often offered extra incentives (e.g., reducing the price, offering extra cash, or offering additional tickets if the offer includes a trip) to entice the contestant. However, if two or all three contestants were tied, a Dutch auction was frequently conducted. The only stylistic difference was that instead of the host saying "Going once... going twice...", the player was placed on a five-second "Shop Clock".
- Fame Game: The host read clues pertaining to a famous person, place, thing, etc. from a first-person perspective. Unlike the 1980s version, letters filled in a puzzle one at a time on the monitor behind the host. The contestant who answered correctly won $15.

=== Round 2 ===
After the first commercial break, the second round consisted of "Knock-Off", a second Instant Bargain, a second speed round, "Instant Cash", and one final speed round.

- Knock-Off: A category was announced and 12 possible answers were shown; nine answers were correct while three were wrong. Each contestant, in turn, selected one of the answers. A correct answer turned gold and was worth cash (four $2 answers, three $5 answers, a $10 answer, and a $15 answer; Some boards had two $3 answers replacing two worth $2). An incorrect answer turned red and eliminated that contestant for the remainder of that round. Play continued until the last correct answer was found or all three players had been eliminated. In general, the less obvious an answer was, the more it was worth.
- Instant Bargain: Played as before but for a slightly more expensive prize.
- Speed Round #2: Two answers were given before the start of the round, both usually with a similar theme (e.g., "Winger or Gunslinger" and contestants had to identify films as starring Debra Winger or Westerns, which were sometimes called Gunslingers). Once again, the speed round lasted for 30 seconds, and questions were worth $5 up or down.
- Instant Cash: Based on the Sale of the Century round of the same name. The leader at that point was offered a chance at a cash jackpot which began at $500 and rose by that amount until it was claimed or reached $5,000, at which point the pot was frozen until someone won it. To play, the contestant had to give up his/her entire lead over the second-place opponent. If two or more contestants were tied, a Dutch auction was conducted (it usually started at the difference between the tied players and third place). If a contestant opted to play, they were shown three wallets (one white, one brown, one red) and asked to choose one and open it. Inside two of the wallets was a slip that said "$100" on it, with the other having a slip with the amount of money in the Instant Cash jackpot inside. Regardless of whether or not the leader chose to play, Morreale revealed the location of the jackpot.
- Speed Round #3: After a second commercial break, a final 30-second round of questions was played, however each answer was worth +/- $10.

The contestant with the highest score was the champion and advanced to Shopper's Paradise for the "Shopping Spree of a Lifetime". If two or more contestants were tied, a tiebreaker question was played. The contestant who had the right answer earned $10 and became the champion (or remained if s/he was the defending champion). If not, the opponent won $10 and became the champion (or remained)

The losers kept any cash and prizes won during the main game; unlike earlier incarnations of Sale of the Century, no contestants received their score in cash. Any player who had not won anything up to the end of the game received unacknowledged parting gifts.

== Shopper's Paradise ==
Temptation used a similar shopping endgame to its predecessor series, but was slightly different.

After the champion entered Shopper's Paradise, he/she was shown each of the five prizes that could be purchased that week and how much it cost in "Temptation dollars" to buy. Each new prize increased in value as the champion went along, with the most expensive/valuable prize usually being a car. Unlike the Australian version of Temptation, on which this series was based, and 1980s Sale of the Century, there was no opportunity to buy all on-stage prizes, nor receive the cash jackpot for accumulating a high amount of money. Contestants were also not permitted to buy more than one prize in Shopper's Paradise, a rule that carried over from the 1980s Sale series.

Once the entire gallery of prizes was revealed to the champion, he/she attempted to build up his/her bankroll by playing a round of "Super Knock-Off". Like the version played in the front game, twelve answers were shown. This time, only six were right, and the round was played for higher stakes. Four of the answers were worth $25 each, one was worth $50, and one worth $100, for a total of $250 added to the bankroll for finding all six answers. The champion could stop choosing answers whenever they desired, as choosing one of the wrong answers wiped out the bank and ended the round.

After Super Knock-Off was completed, any money from the correct answers was added to the champion's already-accumulated bankroll and they were given the choice to buy a prize, or return on the next show, and try to add more money to the bank. If the total bank was not enough to buy the lowest level prize in Shopper's Paradise, a Croton diamond watch was offered as a consolation prize.

Champions played until they either decided to buy any of the prizes, were defeated, banked enough to buy the highest level prize, or won their fifth match. If that happened, and the champion had not banked enough money for the highest level prize, they were forced to buy any prize that they could afford, and retire undefeated.

== Tournaments ==
From November 19–21, 2007, and again from November 26–28, Temptation aired two 3-day tournaments where three former contestants returned and played for the entire tournament. The contestants were different for each of the two tournaments. Rules remained similar for each tournament, except that contestants started each game with $30. The winner of each game played Super Knock Off. The winner of day 1 and 2 played Super Knock Off, but did not go to "Shopper's Paradise". In day 3, a special 10% off coupon to be used in Shopper's Paradise was presented for the contestant in the lead for the second Instant Bargain if the contestant accepted the bargain. Only the winner of day 3 went to "Shopper's Paradise".

== Shop-at-home offers ==
Before commercial breaks, offers for products at discounted prices were advertised under a deal of the day format. These items were purchased online at the show's official site. The offers were originally separate items, but later became generic "60% off retail" plug offers.

== Broadcast history ==
Temptation was based on the Australian series of the same name, itself a revival of Sale of the Century. The two pilots were filmed on the Australian set with the show's eventual mini-games in place; unlike the series, the pilots used the Australian sound effects and theme (the former based on the 1980s Sale sounds).

Unlike the 2005 Australian revival, this new American iteration only featured women as contestants because of the show's demographic, and to avoid awkard prize substitution requirements regarding fashion and jewelry prizes to be awarded to men; the second season allowed men to compete, though usually with a 2:1 ratio of female/male contestants. The American version of Temptation was also notable for not making use of a studio audience, opting instead for pre-recorded stock applause and reactions instead to allow full use of the stage for merchandise and gameplay.

Owned-and-operated stations of MyNetworkTV were among the stations carrying the show, as was the former WTBS Atlanta (currently known as Peachtree TV). MyNetworkTV aired two sneak preview episodes featuring American Idol alumni Mikalah Gordon, Justin Guarini, and Kimberly Caldwell on September 5, 2007 in prime time. These episodes were aired again on March 13 and 14, 2008.

Before the series premiered, writers went on strike because FremantleMedia refused to recognize the Writers Guild of America as the writers' chosen labor representative.

BUZZR aired reruns of Temptation as part of their Friday Night block from February 9 to April 20, 2018, and brought them back as a weeknight entry that fall.

=== First taped week ===
The first taped week of the series did not air until March 3–7, 2008 and featured a slightly different game structure. The show began with Speed Round #1 followed by Instant Bargain #1, the Fame Game, and Speed Round #2.

After the first commercial break, Knock-Off was played followed by Instant Bargain #2, a second Fame Game worth $25, Instant Cash, and Speed Round #3.

In addition, the price tags at Shopper's Paradise were white instead of orange, and Morreale showed the winning contestant around while Watts described the prizes.

=== Cancellation ===
With the exception of the preview episodes, which rated 0.8, Temptation never rose above 0.5 in the Nielsen rating system, making it the least-watched game show on broadcast television that year; the next lowest-rated game, Merv Griffin's Crosswords, maintained a 0.8–1.0 share.

Although the final first-run episode of Temptation aired on May 23, 2008, the show's official cancellation was not announced until July 29. The final episode was later broadcast as the last repeat on September 5, making it one of only a handful of programs to do so. The series was replaced with Trivial Pursuit: America Plays on most stations that carried it; however, the program experienced similar low ratings as its predecessor and was canceled in April 2009.
