= Rolonda Watts =

American television talk show host

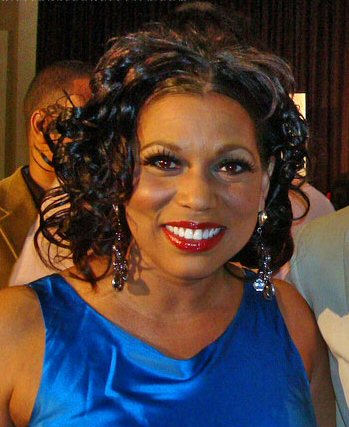
- Watts in 2008
- Born: Winston-Salem, North Carolina, U.S.
- Education: Spelman College (BA); Columbia University (MA)
- Occupations: Actress, television host, radio host, producer
- Years active: 1988–present
- Website: rolonda.com

Rolonda Watts is an American actress, producer, and television and radio talk show host. She is best known for hosting the eponymous Rolonda, an internationally syndicated talk show which aired from 1994 to 1997. Watts was the on-camera announcer for Judge Joe Brown, which ended its run in 2013. She is currently the announcer for Sherri.

== Early life ==
Watts was born in Winston-Salem, North Carolina. Her mother, Velma Gibson Watts, was an associate dean at Wake Forest University and her father, Roland Watts, was chairman of Winston-Salem State University's Fine Arts Department. Watts attended Salem Academy in Winston-Salem, North Carolina as a teenager. She is a graduate of Spelman College in Atlanta, where she was editor-in-chief of the school newspaper and graduated magna cum laude. In 1981, she earned a master's degree from Columbia University Graduate School of Journalism.

== Career ==
After graduating from Columbia, Watts returned to North Carolina and began her career as a general assignment reporter at WFMY-TV in Greensboro, North Carolina. She later worked at WNBC, where she was nominated for an Emmy, and WABC-TV in New York as an anchor of a weekly political forum and reporter. In 1991, she began working as a host of Attitudes, a talk show on Lifetime Television. The next year, she took a job on the newsmagazine Inside Edition as a senior correspondent, weekend anchor and producer. King World Productions, the syndicator of Inside Edition and also The Oprah Winfrey Show, then asked her to start her own talk show. Rolonda aired for nearly four seasons from January 17, 1994, to September 1997. Watts was also supervising producer and one of the owners of the show. In a 2003 interview with Soap Opera Digest, Watts said she folded the show rather than lose her integrity. "Audiences were saying, 'Well, that was really nice of you to be so respectful, but where's Jerry [Springer]?' We had to make a tough decision, either we go that route or we find something else to do."

After leaving her talk show behind, Watts headed to Hollywood, California to pursue a career in acting. Her first break was in 1997 when she was cast as Vivica Shaw in Sister, Sister, a role she played for six episodes. Since then Watts has had guest starring roles in dozens of television shows, including The West Wing, JAG, The District Yes, Dear, and soap operas Days of Our Lives and The Bold and the Beautiful. In 2002, Soap Opera Digest named her "Scene Stealer of the Week" for her role as the cut-throat Attorney Cameron Reese on Days of our Lives. Watts is also the CEO/president of her own production company, Watts Works Productions, which co-produced her talk show Rolonda. In 2005, she hosted Lie Detector, a reality series for PAX-TV. That same year, she took over as announcer on Judge Joe Brown. She also appeared on Live With Regis and Kelly where she traveled cross-country as a judge for the show's "Great American Co-Host Search."

In October 2006, Watts returned to her talk-show roots. She signed with GreenStone Media, a radio network launched by feminists Gloria Steinem and Jane Fonda, to host an afternoon radio show. She hosted the show until the network's closure in August 2007. Subsequently, Watts served as announcer for the game show Temptation, which ran from September 2007 to May 2008. As of 2022, Watts is the voice of Professor Wiseman in the PBS Kids animated program Curious George, as well as voicing "Gladys" in the Nickelodeon series The Penguins of Madagascar. Watts is currently shooting two films, with five others waiting for release, including her first starring role in A Mother's Love and leading roles in Christmas Mail, House Arrest, Soul Ties, Broken Roads and 25 Hill, a film written and produced by Corbin Bernsen. In the short film Return to Babylon, Watts portrays Josephine Baker; in Defying the Stars. she plays the role of Dorothy Dandridge. She recently played the role of Betsy Holiday in Tyler Perry's first animated film Madea's Tough Love.

In between the months of June and August 2017, Rolonda began her stand up career and was offered a radio show from CBS Radio entitled Sundays with Rolonda. Rolonda began starting her own webseries entitled ROmance via YouTube; she also starred in Bounce TV's sitcom series, Mann & Wife as a choir director in a principal casting role.

In 2024, she voiced Aunt P in Invincible Fight Girl.

== Filmography ==
=== Film ===
Year	Title	Role	Notes
1996	Girl 6	Reporter Nita	
1996	The Stupids	Talk Show Hostess	
1997	Meet Wally Sparks	Herself	
2010	Christmas Mail	Sally Covington	
2011	Tim Alexander's A Mother's Love	Regina Reynolds	
2011	25 Hill	Mrs. Banner	
2012	House Arrest	Parole Officer Grimes	
2012	I Will Follow You Into The Dark	Eunice	
2012	Broken Roads	Shirley	
2013	Return to Babylon	Josephine Baker	
2013	House Party: Tonight's the Night	Victoria	
2015	Madea's Tough Love	Betsy Holiday	

=== Television ===
Year	Title	Role	Notes
1992	Lifestories: Families in Crisis	Reporter	Season 1, episode 5 Blood Brothers: The Joey DiPaolo Story
1994–97	Rolonda	Host	
1997–98	Sister, Sister	Vivica Shaw	Six episodes
1998	Smart Guy	Lydia	Season 3, episode 5 That's My Momma
1999	The Jamie Foxx Show	Bonita Walters	Season 3, episode 19 Fire and Desire Pt.2
2000	The Steve Harvey Show	Janet	Season 4, episode 13 Guess Who's Not Coming to Counseling
2000	The West Wing	Melissa	Season 1, episode 17 The White House Pro-Am
2000	Rude Awakening	Lawyer	Season 3, episode 6 Me, Myself and I
2001	The Division	Doctor	Season 1, episode 6 Secrets and Lies
2001	7th Heaven	Sylvia Carter	Two episodes
2001	The District	Mrs. Waters	Season 2, episode 10 Thursday
2002	For Your Love	Dr. Covington	Season 5, episode 1 The "What I Done" Show
2002–08	Days of Our Lives	Cameron Reese	13 episodes
2003	One on One	Dr. Taylor	Season 2, episode 15 The Test
2003	Maniac Magee	Mrs. Beale	TV movie
2003	Boston Public	Monica Clemens	Season 3, episode 20 Chapter Sixty-Four
2003	The Proud Family	Reshanda Watson (voice)	Season 3, episode 4 Election
2003	The Bold and the Beautiful	Julie Shoemaker	Five episodes
2004	Yes, Dear	Sylvia	Season 4, episode 16 Dead Aunt, Dead Aunt (CBS)
2004	Ned's Declassified School Survival Guide	Ms. Morrison	Season 1, episode 3 Teachers and Detention (Nickelodeon)
2004	My Wife and Kids	Angeline Boudreaux	Season 5, episode 6 Poker Face (ABC)
2004	JAG	Judge Deborah Mayfield	Season 10, episode 7 Camp Delta (CBS)
2005	Complete Savages	Claire	Season 1, episode 18 Bad Reception (ABC)
2005	Lie Detector	Host	
2005–13	Judge Joe Brown	Announcer	
2006	America's Next Top Model	Special Correspondent	Cycle 6, episode 1
2006–22	Curious George	Prof. Wiseman (voice)	
2007	Temptation	Announcer	TV game show
2008	Can You Teach My Alligator Manners	Mrs. Sullivan (voice)	Season 1, episode 6 Classroom Manners
2009	Curious George: A Very Monkey Christmas	Prof. Wiseman (voice)	TV movie
2011–12	The Penguins of Madagascar	Gladys (voice)	3 episodes
2012	Good Luck Charlie	Diane Van der Weiss	Season 3, episode 3 Amy Needs a Shower
2014–15	Divorce Court	Announcer	1 season
2016–24	Kulipari: An Army of Frogs	Chief Olba (voice)	Recurring role
2018	Criminal Minds	Doctor Melissa Myers	Two episodes
2019	Cannon Busters	Mumbles, Mama Hitch, additional voices	English dub
2019	Psycho Nurse	Dr. Keller	Supporting character
2022–2026	Sherri	Announcer	
2024	Invincible Fight Girl	Aunt P (voice)	
