= Whistleblower (American TV program) =

True crime television series

- Genre: True crime
- Presented by: Alex Ferrer
- Country of origin: United States
- Original language: English
- No. of seasons: 2
- No. of episodes: 14

Production
- Executive producers: Alex Ferrer; Susan Zirinsky; Ted Eccles
- Production companies: CBS News; CBS Studios

Original release
- Network: CBS
- Release: July 13, 2018 – June 28, 2019

Whistleblower is an American true crime television program that premiered on CBS on July 13, 2018. It is hosted by Alex Ferrer.

On May 17, 2019, it was announced that the second season would premiere on May 24, 2019. The show was not renewed for a third season.

== Episodes ==
Season	Episodes	Originally released	
Season	Episodes	First released	Last released
1	8	July 13, 2018	August 31, 2018
2	6	May 24, 2019	June 28, 2019

=== Season 1 (2018) ===
No. overall	No. in season	Title	Original release date	U.S. viewers (millions)
1	1	"Blow the Whistle, Change the World"	July 13, 2018	3.04
2	2	"The Deadly Cancer Doctor & the Ugly Side of the Beauty Business"	July 20, 2018	3.30
3	3	"The Case Against Northrop"	July 27, 2018	3.07
4	4	"The Case Against the Cardiologists and the Case Against Wells Fargo"	August 3, 2018	2.99
5	5	"The Case Against Los Alamos"	August 10, 2018	2.54
6	6	"The Case Against Eclinicalworks; The Case Against Chartwells"	August 17, 2018	2.02
7	7	"The Case Against Second Chance Body Armor"	August 17, 2018	2.01
8	8	"The Case Against Globeu; The Case of The 100 Million Dollar Scam"	August 31, 2018	2.24

=== Season 2 (2019) ===
No. overall	No. in season	Title	Original release date	U.S. viewers (millions)
9	1	"Chicago PD: Breaking The Code Of Silence"	May 24, 2019	3.94
10	2	"Polygamy"	May 31, 2019	4.19
11	3	"Sea World"	June 7, 2019	3.60
12	4	"OBGYN/Mortuary"	June 14, 2019	3.24
13	5	"The Billion-Dollar Back Surgery Scam: Patients in Pain and Peril"	June 21, 2019	3.38
14	6	"Bunny's War: The Case Against the U.S. Army Corps of Engineers; Opioid Lollipops: The Case Against Cephalon"	June 28, 2019	3.33
