= Trivial Pursuit: America Plays =

2008 television series

- Genre: Game show
- Directed by: Jeff Rifkin
- Presented by: Christopher Knight
- Country of origin: United States
- Original language: English
- No. of seasons: 1
- No. of episodes: 170

Production
- Executive producers: Burt Wheeler; Sharon Sussman
- Producers: Leonard Koss (senior producer); Jade Mills
- Running time: 22 minutes
- Production companies: Wheeler/Sussman Productions; Hasbro; Debmar-Mercury

Original release
- Network: Syndicated
- Release: September 22, 2008 – May 22, 2009

Related
- Trivial Pursuit (1993–1994, 2024–present); Trivial Pursuit UK (1990, 1993–1994)

Trivial Pursuit: America Plays is an American syndicated game show loosely based on the board game of the same name. It premiered on September 22, 2008 and aired first-run episodes through May 22, 2009 (with repeats continuing until September 18). The host was Christopher Knight (the pilot was hosted by Mark L. Walberg), and the show is produced by Wheeler/Sussman Productions in association with Hasbro. The series was syndicated by Debmar-Mercury.

Trivial Pursuit: America Plays replaced Temptation on a majority of stations that carried it, and inherited its predecessor's low ratings. In January 2009, it was announced that America Plays would not be renewed for a second season.

== Rules ==
The show pitted three in-studio players against "America's Team", which consisted of people who submitted their questions via video.

=== Round 1 ===
On the board were six categories which roughly corresponded to the actual ones (green was most often a miscellaneous category titled "Whatever"):

Color	Possible categories			
Blue	Places	Geography	The World	Travel
Pink	TV	Movies	Entertainment	Hollywood
Yellow	People	The Past	History	
Purple	Celebs		Music	
Green	Whatever			
Orange	Best Sellers	Sports & Games	Fashion	Food

A computer (called the "Randomizer") randomly picked a category and value ($250 to $500 in increments of $50 depending on the difficulty) for each question. Each correct answer by the studio contestants put the value into the studio bank, and earned that player a wedge for their scoring token, if they did not already have one of that selected color. An incorrect answer put the value in America's bank, and no money was put in the studio bank for that question, even if it was answered correctly by another player. The money was added each time a contestant attempted to answer the question and failed to answer correctly, so America's bank could be credited with double or triple the value of the question if more than one player gave an incorrect answer. If no one buzzed in, or if no other contestant attempted to answer after the first incorrect response, the money was added to America's bank un-multiplied. (In earlier-taped shows, the multiplier was not applied.)

The first question of the round was an "All Play" question, in which anyone was eligible to answer. The player who answered this toss-up question correctly had first chance at the following question, and kept control until they either missed a question or earned their third wedge. If they missed or took too long to answer the question, the other two were able to buzz in and steal control and the wedge with a correct answer. However, as in the board game, if a contestant answered a question in a category they already had a wedge for, no wedges were awarded, but the contestant earned control of the next question.

Once a player earned three wedges, they moved to the "Hot Pursuit" round, and the next question was an "All Play" for the other two players, who competed to join the first player. The first two players to fill three of the wedges in their token moved on to the next round; the other was eliminated.

For the second or third question (which was most often the green category) of the first round, the captain of America's team was introduced, via live webcam, to ask it. They were shown multiple times through the show.

=== Round 2 ===
Round 2 was called Hot Pursuit. All questions were toss-up questions worth $500 ($1,000 in early episodes). There were no specific categories; each correct answer simply filled in one wedge, regardless of color. The first player to fill all six wedges of their token won the game. The three wedges from the first round carried over, so three correct answers won the game.

=== Head-to-Head Round ===
The winning player faced "America's Team" one-on-one, with six new categories, each with increasing values:

Question	1	2	3	4	5	6
Value	$500	$1,000	$2,000	$3,000	$4,000	$5,000

The categories were shown at the outset, and the order in which they are asked was shuffled. The host put the categories into motion, and when the America's Team captain saw an order that sounded suitable, they would say "Stop!," which sets the categories' order and value. As before, questions answered correctly went to the player's bank, while questions answered incorrectly went to America's Bank. The team with the larger bank at the end won their bank. If America won, its bank was divided evenly among all the people who had their questions asked that day. In that situation, a list of the winning members of America's team was shown, similar to a credit roll, and the studio contestant won a Trivial Pursuit board game.

At any point, if it became mathematically impossible for one bank to overtake the other, the final round stopped. If the studio bank won in this situation, the studio player had the chance to play the next unused question as a double-or-nothing wager, or decline to do so. If America's bank was higher, the remaining questions were discarded. If there was a tie at the end of the game, a sudden-death question was asked. The side who answered the question correctly won the game.

== Specials ==
- Brady Week: During the week of November 10, 2008, four of the Brady Kids from The Brady Bunch (Christopher Knight's most well known role) - Barry Williams, Mike Lookinland, Eve Plumb, and Susan Olsen (Maureen McCormick was not available for unexplained reasons) - appeared on the show with a different Brady captain each day. During that week, the category for the green wedge was changed to "The Bradys". At the end of the week, Lookinland, Plumb, and Olsen competed for charity, with Williams as America's team captain.
- Judges Week: During the week of November 17, 2008, television judges and bailiffs appeared on the show with a different judge as America's team captain every day. The competitors were Judge Alex Ferrer from Judge Alex, Judge Joe Brown, Judge Lynn Toler from Divorce Court, and Judge Cristina Pérez from Cristina's Court. During that week, the category for the green wedge was changed to the name of the judge who was America's team captain that day. The Tuesday show that week featured Petri Hawkins-Byrd, the bailiff on Judge Judy, as a studio contestant. At the end of the week, Ferrer, Toler, and Perez competed for charity, with Brown as America's team captain.
- On the March 10, 2009 episode, Knight's then-wife Adrianne Curry appeared on the show as America's team captain. The green category included questions about Knight and Curry.

== See also ==
- Trivial Pursuit
- Board game
- Game show
