= Judge Alex =

American reality court show (2005–2014)

- Genre: Arbitration-based reality court show
- Directed by: Eddie October; Michael Dimitch; Art Bergel
- Starring: Alex Ferrer (judge); Victor Simon (bailiff 2005–2010); Mason Burroughs (bailiff 2010–2014)
- Narrated by: Randy Schell
- Theme music composer: Scott Szabo
- Country of origin: United States
- Original language: English
- No. of seasons: 9
- No. of episodes: 1,350

Production
- Executive producers: Kathy Sapp; Burt Wheeler; Sharon Sussman
- Production locations: KRIV Studios, Houston, Texas (2005–2010); Sunset Bronson Studios, Los Angeles, California (2010–2014)
- Camera setup: Multiple
- Running time: 22 minutes
- Production companies: Monet Lane Productions (2010–2014); 20th Television

Original release
- Network: Syndication
- Release: September 12, 2005 – May 21, 2014

Judge Alex is an American arbitration-based reality court show presided over by retired police officer, lawyer, and Florida State Circuit Court Judge Alex Ferrer. The series premiered on September 12, 2005, replacing Texas Justice on most of its stations, and ended on May 21, 2014. The show aired in syndication.

On January 17, 2014, the series was canceled after nine seasons. The final episode aired on May 21, 2014, With reruns continuing until August of that year.

Reruns would briefly air during the 2016–17 season on most stations and on the Nosey streaming service during the 2018–19 season.

== Judge Alex Ferrer ==
Ferrer handled cases that ranged from armed robberies to kidnappings and first-degree murders as a Florida circuit court judge. Every three weeks, he taped ten cases a day over three days previously in Houston where the show was based (In the 2010–2011 season the show moved to Sunset Bronson Studios in Los Angeles); he then flew back home to Miami, where he lives with his wife and two children.

Using his sense of humor, Ferrer was not overly harsh or given to mouthing off like some of his judicial counterparts, though he did keep a firm control over his courtroom and did not allow misconduct or disrespect. Ferrer's rulings were often prefaced by his explanation of the law at hand to his audience.
