= Broken Roads (film) =

- Poster
- Directed by: Justin Chambers
- Screenplay by: Justin Chambers
- Produced by: Justin Chambers; William Alexander IV; Karina Diaz
- Starring: Sally Kirkland; Aidan Bristow; Shoshana Bush; Rolonda Watts; Ross Marquand; Lisa Glass; Terrell Tilford
- Cinematography: Michael Moghaddam
- Edited by: Justin Chambers; Karina Diaz
- Music by: Jimmy Gelhaar
- Production company: Crevice Entertainment Company LLC.
- Distributed by: Synkronized Films theatrical: Crevice Entertainment Company LLC.
- Release date: December 14, 2012 (Los Angeles)
- Running time: 151 minutes
- Country: United States
- Language: English

Broken Roads is a 2012 American family drama film written, directed and produced by Justin Chambers alongside producer William Alexander IV and producer/editor Karina Diaz, and starring Sally Kirkland as Wallace Russo and Aidan Bristow as Aldo Russo.

Filming for the film began in July 2011 and ended in August 2011. The film world-premiered in Los Angeles, California, on September 19, 2011, followed by an encore in Lake Havasu City, Arizona, on November 8 that same year. The film was released theatrically on December 14, 2012, in select cities in the United States by Synkronized Films and Crevice Entertainment Company LLC.

== Plot ==
A teen's life is shattered by a fatal car crash, leaving his mother dead and him lost from the world. He's forced to move to a small town to live with his grandmother, whom he's never met. After living together, they discover that they're unable to find peace with their own demons until they've found peace with each other. Broken Roads is a contrasted portrait of life and dealing with loss. A character driven journey of rediscovery and the hills climbed which forever change us.
