= Canada's Top 20 Countdown =

- Genre: Music chart show, talk
- Running time: Approx. 2 hrs. (including commercials)
- Country of origin: Canada
- Home station: CKBE-FM
- Hosted by: A. J. Reynolds (2009–2016); Julia Kilbride (2010–?) various guest hosts
- Created by: Alfred (A. J.) Reynolds
- Written by: Madaline Martelle
- Executive producer: Miguel Sanchaez
- Original release: September 2009 – 2016
- No. of episodes: CHR: 247, Rock: 188, Country: 170 (as of June 12, 2014)
- Website: www.canadastop20.ca

Canada's Top 20 Countdown was a Canadian weekly syndicated radio chart program based in Halifax, Nova Scotia. The countdown began in September 2009 and is owned and produced by Positive Number Productions.

== The Countdown ==
The program was available to radio stations in two formats: CHR/Hot AC branded as Pop 20, and 1980s and early 1990s pop & rock branded as The Retro 20. A rock and a country version of the show were introduced in 2010 but have since been discontinued. Each program ran two hours in duration, and they counted down the 20 biggest songs from coast to coast in their respective genres. The program was syndicated to stations throughout Canada, as well as on Air Canada flights worldwide and, until its 2014 closure, on Canadian Forces Radio. A variation of the show, Canada's Top 20 Skate, has also been heard at hockey arenas throughout Canada.

The CHR/Hot AC, and the now defunct rock version, of Canada's Top 20 were hosted by Alfred (A. J.) Reynolds. The defunct country version was hosted by Julia Kilbride. Other personalities featured in the program include Ed the Sock and Floyd Blaikie.

== Commitment to Canadian Content ==
Canada's Top 20 had interviewed over 350 Canadian musical artists in its Canadian Artist of the Week segment. The countdown maintained a minimum of 40% Canadian Content and prided itself on its commitment to up and coming Canadian artists by featuring an unsigned, independent artist on its show monthly.

== Production team ==
- Miguel Sanchaez – Executive Producer
- Madaline Martelle – Artistic Director / Media Manager
- AJ Reynolds – Producer

=== Past contributors ===
- Alex Ewing – Executive Producer
- Kelly Campbell – Executive Producer
- Julia Kilbride - Country Music Host
