= Broadcast syndication =

Programs broadcast by leasing rights to multiple stations

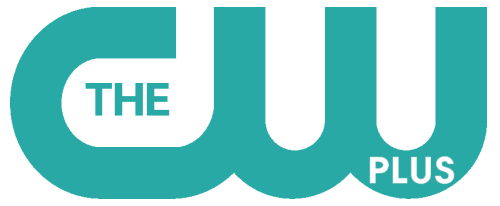
Logos of the two American terrestrial commercial television syndication services (Left: The CW Plus, Right: MyNetworkTV)

Broadcast syndication is the practice of content owners leasing the right to broadcast their content to other television stations or radio stations, without having an official broadcast network to air it on. It is common in the United States where broadcast programming is scheduled by television networks with local independent affiliates. Syndication is less widespread in the rest of the world, as most countries have centralized networks or television stations without local affiliates. Shows can be syndicated internationally, although this is less common.

Three common types of syndication are: first-run syndication, which is programming that is broadcast for the first time as a syndicated show and is made specifically for the purpose of selling it into syndication; off-network syndication (colloquially called a "rerun"), which is the licensing of a program whose first airing was on stations inside the television network that produced it, or in some cases a program that was first-run syndicated, to other stations; and public broadcasting syndication.

== Types ==
=== First-run syndication ===
In first-run syndication, a program is broadcast for the first time as a syndicated show. Often these programs are made specifically to sell directly into syndication and not made for any particular network.

=== Off-network syndication ===
In off-network syndication, a program whose first airing was on network television (or, in some cases, first-run syndication) is licensed for local broadcast on individual stations. Reruns are usually found on stations affiliated with smaller networks like The CW Plus or MyNetworkTV, especially since these networks broadcast one less hour of prime time network programming than the Big Four television networks and far less network-provided daytime television (none at all for these networks). A show usually enters off-network syndication when it has built up about four seasons' worth or between 80 and 100 episodes, though for some genres the number could be as low as 65. Successful shows in syndication can cover production costs and make a profit, even if the first run of the show was not profitable.

=== Public broadcasting syndication ===
This type of syndication has arisen in the U.S. as a parallel service to member stations of the Public Broadcasting Service (PBS) and the handful of independent public broadcasting stations. This form of syndication more closely resembles the news agency model, where nominally competing networks share resources and rebroadcast each other's programs. For example, National Public Radio (NPR) stations commonly air the Public Radio Exchange's This American Life, which may contain stories produced by NPR journalists.

== Process ==
When syndicating a show, the production company, or a distribution company called a syndicator, attempts to license the show to one station in each media market or area, or to a commonly owned station group, within the country and internationally. If successful, this can be lucrative, but the syndicator may only be able to license the show in a small percentage of the markets. Syndication differs from licensing the show to a television network. Once a network picks up a show, it is usually guaranteed to run on most or all the network's affiliates on the same day of the week and at the same time (in a given time zone, in countries where this is a concern). Some production companies create their shows and license them to networks at a loss, at least at first, hoping that the series will succeed and that eventual off-network syndication will turn a profit for the show. A syndicated program is licensed to stations for "cash" (the stations purchase the rights to local insertion of some or all of the advertisements at their level); given to stations for access to airtime (wherein the syndicators get the advertising revenue); or the combination of both. The trade of program for airtime is called "barter."

In the United States (as a result of continued relaxation of station ownership regulations since the 1970s), syndicated programs are usually licensed to stations on a group level, with multiple stations owned and/or operated by the same broadcasting group carrying the program in different markets (except in areas where another station holds the market rights to the program) – making it increasingly more efficient for syndicators to gain widespread national clearances for their programs. Many syndicated programs are traditionally sold first to one of seven "key" station groups (Nexstar Media Group, ABC Owned Television Stations, NBC Owned Television Stations, CBS News and Stations, Fox Television Stations, Telemundo Station Group, and Televisa Univision), allowing their programs to gain clearances in the largest U.S. TV markets (such as New York City, Los Angeles, San Francisco and Philadelphia, where all six aforementioned groups each own stations), before striking deals with other major and smaller station owners. Shows airing in first-run syndication that are carried primarily by an owned-and-operated station of a network may sometimes be incorrectly referenced as a network program, especially if said network's syndication wing distributes the program, regardless to its distribution to stations of varying network affiliations and despite the fact it is not part of an individual network's base schedule.

Since the early 2000s, some programs being proposed for national distribution in first-run syndication have been test marketed on a selected number of or all stations owned by certain major station group, allowing the distributor to determine whether a national roll-out is feasible based on the ratings accrued in the selected markets where the program is being aired.

While market penetration can vary widely and revenues can be unreliable, the producers often enjoy more content freedom in the absence of network's standards and practices departments; frequently, some innovative ideas are explored by first-run syndicated programming which the networks are leery of giving airtime to. Meanwhile, top-rated syndicated shows in the United States usually have a domestic market reach as high as 98%. Very often, series that are aired in syndication have reduced running times. For example, a standard American sitcom runs 22 minutes, but in syndication it may be reduced to 20 minutes to make room for more commercials.

Syndication can take the form of either weekly or daily syndication. Game shows, some "tabloid" and entertainment news shows, and talk shows are broadcast daily on weekdays, while most other first-run syndicated shows are broadcast on a weekly basis and are usually aired on weekends only. Big discussion occurred in the 1990s and 2000s about whether previously aired episodes of a show could become syndicated while new episodes of it continued to air on its original network. There had been much opposition to this idea and it was generally viewed to lead to the death of the show. However, licensing a program for syndication actually resulted in the increased popularity for shows that remained in production. A prime example is Law & Order.

== First-run syndication in the U.S. ==
As with radio in the U.S., television networks, particularly in their early years, did not offer a full day's worth of programming for their affiliates, even in the evening or "prime time" hours. In the early days of television, this was less of an issue, as there were in most markets fewer TV stations than there were networks (at the time four), which meant that the stations that did exist affiliated with multiple networks and, when not airing network or local programs, typically sign-on and sign-off. The loosening of licensing restrictions, and the subsequent passage of the All-Channel Receiver Act, meant that by the early 1960s, the situation had reversed. There were now more stations than the networks—now down to three in number after the failure of the DuMont Television Network—could serve. Some stations were not affiliated with any network, operating as independent stations. Both groups sought to supplement their locally produced programming with content that could be flexibly scheduled. The development of videotape and, much later, enhanced satellite down link access furthered these options. While most past first-run syndicated shows were shown only in syndication, some canceled network shows continued to be produced for first-run syndication or were revived for syndication several years after their original cancellation. Until about 1980, most syndicated series were distributed to stations either on 16mm film prints (off-network reruns, feature films, and cartoons) or videotape (topical series such as the talk shows of Mike Douglas and Merv Griffin, and variety and quiz shows).

Ziv Television Programs, after establishing itself as a major radio syndicator, was the first major first-run television syndicator, creating several long-lived series in the 1950s and selling them directly to regional sponsors, who in turn sold the shows to local stations. Ziv's first major TV hit was The Cisco Kid. Ziv had the foresight to film The Cisco Kid in color, even though color TV was still in its infancy and most stations did not yet support the technology. Among the most widely seen Ziv offerings were Sea Hunt, I Led Three Lives, Highway Patrol and Ripcord. Some first-run syndicated series were picked up by networks in the 1950s and early 1960s, such as the Adventures of Superman and Mr. Ed. The networks began syndicating their reruns in the late 1950s, and first-run syndication shrank sharply for a decade. Some stalwart series continued, including Death Valley Days; other ambitious projects were also to flourish, however briefly, such as The Play of the Week (1959–1961), produced by David Susskind (of the syndicated talk show Open End and also producer of such network fare as NYPD).

Among other syndicated series of the 1950s were MCA's The Abbott and Costello Show (vaudeville-style comedy) and Guild Films' Liberace (musical variety) and Life With Elizabeth, a domestic situation comedy that introduced Betty White to a national audience. In addition to the Adventures of Superman, many other series were based on comic strips and aimed at the juvenile audience, including Flash Gordon; Dick Tracy; Sheena, Queen of the Jungle; and Joe Palooka. Original juvenile adventure series included Captain Gallant of the Foreign Legion, Cowboy G-Men, and Ramar of the Jungle. Series based on literary properties included Sherlock Holmes, Long John Silver (based on Treasure Island), and The Three Musketeers. Several of these were co-productions between American and European (usually British) companies. Crusader Rabbit pioneered in the area of first-run animated series; followed by Bucky and Pepito, Colonel Bleep, Spunky and Tadpole, Q. T. Hush, and others. (All of these were five-minute shorts designed to be placed within locally hosted kiddie shows.) Syndicated sports programming included Championship Bowling and All-Star Golf, both produced by Chicago-based Walter Schwimmer Inc.

In addition to regular series, syndicators also offered packages of feature films, cartoons, and short subjects originally made for movie theaters. Until late in the 1950s, however, much of the theatrical product available consisted of low-budget secondary features (mainly Westerns) with relatively few notable stars. One syndication company, National Telefilm Associates, attempted to create a "NTA Film Network" of stations showing its lineup of first-run series, which included syndicated programs such as Police Call (1955), How to Marry a Millionaire (1957–1959), The Passerby, Man Without a Gun (1957–1959), and This Is Alice (1958). The venture lasted five years and closed down in 1961.

By the late 1960s, a de facto two-tiered system had developed in the United States, with the major network affiliates (usually on longer-range VHF stations) consistently drawing more viewers than their UHF, independent counterparts; syndicators thus hoped to get their programs onto the major network stations, where spots in the lineup were far more scarce. Federal Communications Commission (FCC) rulings in 1971 curtailed the American networks' ability to schedule programming in what has become known as the "fringe time", notably the 7–8 p.m. (Eastern and Pacific Time) hour of "prime time", with the stated hope that this might encourage more local programming of social and cultural relevance to communities (off-network syndicated repeats were also banned); some projects of this sort came to fruition, though these were usually relatively commercial and slick efforts such as Group W's Evening/PM Magazine franchise, and such pre-existing national projects as the brief commercial-television run of William F. Buckley Jr.'s interview/debate series Firing Line. The more obvious result was an increase in Canadian-produced syndicated dramatic series, such as Dusty's Trail and the Colgate-sponsored Dr. Simon Locke. Game shows, often evening editions of network afternoon series, flourished, and a few odd items such as Wild Kingdom, canceled by NBC in 1971, had a continuing life as syndicated programming tailor-made for the early fringe.

=== 1970s and 1980s ===
In 1971, the U.S. FCC passed the Prime Time Access Rule and Financial Interest and Syndication Rules, which prevented networks from programming one particular hour of prime time programming on its television stations each night and required the networks to spin off their syndication arms as independent companies. Although the intent of the rule was to encourage local stations to produce their own programs for this time slot, budgetary limits instead prompted stations to buy syndicated programs to fill the slot. This, coupled with an increase in UHF independent stations, caused a boom in the syndication market. In the 1970s, first-run syndication continued to be an odd mix: cheaply produced, but not always poor quality, "filler" programming. These included the dance-music show Soul Train, and 20th Century Fox's That's Hollywood, a television variation on the popular That's Entertainment! theatrically released collections of film clips from the Metro-Goldwyn-Mayer library.

There were also many imported programs distributed this way. These include the documentary series Wild, Wild World of Animals (repackaged by Time Life with narration by William Conrad) and Thames Television's sober and necessarily grim The World at War. The Starlost (1973) was a Canadian series, apparently modified from the vision of science fiction writers Harlan Ellison and Ben Bova. Britain's ITC Entertainment, headed by Lew Grade, made UFO (1970) and Space: 1999 (1975). These two series were created by Gerry Anderson (and his associates), previously best known for Supermarionation (a combination of puppetry and animation) series such as Thunderbirds. The most successful syndicated show in the United States in the 1970s was probably The Muppet Show, also from Lew Grade's company. Animated series from the 1980s Dogtanian and the Three Muskehounds and Around the World with Willy Fog came from Spanish animation production company BRB Internacional and their Japanese co-producers Nippon Animation.

Game shows thrived in syndication during the decade. Nightly versions of What's My Line?, Truth or Consequences, Beat the Clock and To Tell the Truth premiered in the late 1960s and found loyal audiences for many years. Several daytime network games began producing once-a-week nighttime versions for broadcast in the early evening hours, usually with bigger prizes and often featuring different hosts (emcees were limited to appearing on one network and one syndicated game simultaneously) and modified titles (Match Game PM, The $100,000 Name That Tune or The $25,000 Pyramid, for example). A few independent game shows, such as Sports Challenge and Celebrity Bowling, also entered the syndication market around this time. Of these shows, Let's Make a Deal and Hollywood Squares were the first to jump to twice-a-week syndicated versions, in about 1973. Another popular daytime show to have a weekly syndicated version was The Price Is Right, which began concurrently in weekly syndication and on CBS; the syndicated "nighttime" version was hosted by Dennis James for its first five years, after which daytime host Bob Barker took over for another three years of weekly episodes (even though, by this point, the daytime and nighttime shows had diverged noticeably). The nighttime version of Family Feud (1977) quickly jumped from once-weekly to twice, and finally to five-day-a-week airings, and its massive popularity, along with that of new five-day-a-week entries like Jack Barry's The Joker's Wild (1977) and Tic-Tac-Dough (1978), the move of Match Game's daily run from CBS to syndication (1979), and Chuck Barris's increasingly raunchy remakes of his 1960s hits The Newlywed Game and The Dating Game, brought an end (with rare exceptions) to the era of once-a-week games. Also popular in first-run syndication and daytime was The Gong Show, hosted by Barris throughout most of its run (Gary Owens hosted the first syndicated season).

A number of half-hour musical-variety shows were also offered in the early 1970s, generally built around personable middle-of-the-road singers like Bobby Vinton, Bobby Goldsboro, Dolly Parton, and Andy Williams, or groups like Sha Na Na, The Johnny Mann Singers, and The Golddiggers. Wait Till Your Father Gets Home (1972) was a Hanna-Barbera cartoon series attempting to ape the All in the Family-style sitcoms; Skippy the Bush Kangaroo (1969), an Australian children's series, or Gentle Ben (a decade later, the decidedly not-for-children Australian Prisoner: Cell Block H would have a brief American syndicated run); and a Canadian sketch-comedy series began appearing on U.S. television stations in 1977—Second City Television, which would eventually find a home, for two seasons, on NBC, as SCTV Network 90 (and on premium cable channel Cinemax by 1983).

The Universal/Paramount-produced package of original programming, Operation Prime Time, began appearing on ad hoc quasi-networks of (almost by necessity) non-network stations in the U.S. in 1978, with a mini-series adaptation of John Jakes' The Bastard. From the later 1960s into the late 1970s, Westinghouse also found considerable success with The Mike Douglas Show, a variety/talk show hosted by a singer with an easygoing interview style, which aired in the afternoons in most markets; similar programs soon followed featuring Merv Griffin, who had been the host of CBS' most sustained late-night answer to The Tonight Show Starring Johnny Carson previously, and another network veteran, Dinah Shore. Also notable was the growing success of audience-participation talk shows, particularly that of the innovator of the format, Phil Donahue.

First-run syndication in the 1970s also made it possible for some shows that were no longer wanted by television networks to remain on the air. In 1971, ABC canceled The Lawrence Welk Show, which went on to produce new episodes in syndication for another 11 years, and currently continues to much success in weekend reruns (with new segments featuring Welk cast members inserted within the episodes) distributed to PBS stations by the Oklahoma Educational Television Authority. Also in 1971, CBS dropped Lassie and Hee Haw, the latter show's run ending as part of the network's cancellation of all of its rural-oriented shows (known then as "rural purge", which also resulted in the cancellations of The Beverly Hillbillies and Green Acres). Lassie entered first-run syndication for two years, while Hee Haw continued to produce new episodes until 1992.

The 1980s are also notable for the court show genre being introduced into syndication. It began with The People's Court, an American program featuring an arbitrator handling small claims disputes in a simulated courtroom set. The People's Court was the first of all arbitration-base reality programs, which later exploded in popularity beginning in the late 1990s. The original series ran from 1981 to 1993, with the revival airing from 1997 to 2023. Both versions ran in first-run syndication.

==== First-run syndicated comedy ====
Throughout the mid-to-late 1980s into the early 1990s, sitcoms continued to enter first-run syndication after being canceled by the networks, the most successful of which were Mama's Family and Charles in Charge. Other sitcoms during this time to enter first-run syndication after network cancellation included Silver Spoons, Punky Brewster, Webster, It's a Living, Too Close for Comfort, and 9 to 5. Many of these sitcoms produced new shows in syndication mainly to have enough episodes for a profitable run in reruns. Other sitcoms, such as Small Wonder, Out of This World, The Munsters Today, and Harry and the Hendersons (as well as more action-adventure oriented series like Superboy and My Secret Identity) enjoyed success in syndication throughout their entire run.

==== Dramatic first-run syndicated programs ====
The broadcast networks aired many action-adventure programs from the 1950s to the 1980s. By the late 1980s, however, increasing production costs made them less attractive to the networks. Studios found that reruns of one-hour dramas did not sell as well as sitcoms, so they were unable to fully recoup the shows' costs using the traditional deficit financing model. When NBC canceled the television series adaptation of Fame after only two seasons, the producers made special arrangements with LBS Communications, which resulted in MGM reviving the series for first-run syndication in the fall of 1983, where it continued for four more seasons, with the last first-run episode airing in the U.S. on May 18, 1987.

Star Trek: The Next Generation debuted in 1987, and became the most-watched syndicated show throughout its seven-year run. Its great success caused many others to debut. Friday the 13th: The Series (a horror series which shared its title with the successful movie franchise) also debuted in 1987. The next syndicated shows that debuted in 1988 were War of the Worlds and Freddy's Nightmares. Baywatch, which debuted in 1989 on NBC and was canceled after one season also became one of the most watched syndicated shows throughout its ten-year-run, garnering a worldwide audience.

By 1994, there were more than 20 one-hour syndicated shows. Star Trek: Deep Space Nine and Renegade were also syndicated. Hercules: The Legendary Journeys and its spin-off series Xena: Warrior Princess were also popular, often tying Deep Space Nine at 5% to 6% of the Nielsen-monitored audience. Forever Knight drew devoted "cult" audiences (3% rating). Psi Factor and Poltergeist: The Legacy attempted to draw on the audience for the Fox series The X-Files (as did the short-lived spinoff Baywatch Nights). Among the other series were Relic Hunter, V.I.P., High Tide, She Spies, and Once a Thief.

Babylon 5 began life in 1993 on the Prime Time Entertainment Network (PTEN), moved into syndicated distribution when its network was displaced by WB/UPN-affiliated stations, and eventually ended its final season on TNT (1998). In 1997 Earth: Final Conflict, based on ideas from Gene Roddenberry, premiered in syndication. Three years later, a second Gene Roddenberry series, Andromeda also premiered in syndication. As emerging networks WB and UPN signed contracts with formerly-independent stations, and the syndication market shrunk, Andromeda season 5 moved to the Syfy Channel (2004).

There was not another first-run syndicated drama (or a first-run scripted series in syndication) until 2008, when Disney-ABC Domestic Television and ABC Studios teamed up with Sam Raimi to launch a new first-run syndicated series, Legend of the Seeker, based on Terry Goodkind's Sword of Truth novel series. Another gap in first-run scripted series in syndication followed for four years after Legend of the Seeker was canceled in 2009, until Trifecta Entertainment & Media (a company that mainly distributes programs for off-network syndication) began producing SAF3 (pronounced "safe") in 2013.

==== Animated series ====
During the late 1970s and 1980s, independent stations signed on in mid-sized and many small markets. The market for made-for-television cartoons grew as a result to include a branch for such stations. It usually had a greater artistic freedom, and looser standards (not mandated by a network). The older Bugs Bunny and Popeye cartoons made way for first-run syndicated cartoons such as He-Man and the Masters of the Universe, Inspector Gadget, Heathcliff, ThunderCats, My Little Pony, The Transformers, G.I. Joe, Voltron, Teenage Mutant Ninja Turtles, and reruns of Scooby-Doo, Garfield and Friends, and The Pink Panther, among many others.

Syndication was also important for the nascent anime community in the United States, with imports like Speed Racer and Star Blazers (a localized edit of Space Battleship Yamato) helping to grow interest in Japanese animation. This led to the establishment of companies dedicated to importing and translating anime such as Streamline Pictures and Viz Media towards the end of the 1980s.

In 1987, The Walt Disney Company tried its luck at syndication; DuckTales premiered that September and would eventually last for 100 episodes. The success of DuckTales paved the way for a second series two years later, Chip 'n Dale: Rescue Rangers. The following year, the two shows aired together under the umbrella block The Disney Afternoon. In the fall of 1990, Disney added another hour to The Disney Afternoon; the block continued in syndication, running additional first-run animated series until 1999.

These cartoons initially competed with the ones that were nationally televised on the broadcast networks. In the 1980s, national broadcast networks only aired cartoons on Saturday mornings, not competing with the weekday and Sunday syndication blocks aired by local independent stations; however, by the 1990s, Fox and then The WB launched their own weekday afternoon children's program blocks. By the end of the 1990s, both syndication distributors and broadcast networks ended up losing most of their children's market to the rise of cable television channels aimed at that audience such as Nickelodeon and Cartoon Network, which provided appealing children's entertainment throughout the week at nearly all hours.

Syndication remains a method of choice for distributing children's programming, although this has gradually shifted to only produce programs to satisfy the federally mandated "regulations on children's television programming in the United States" (E/I) rule imposed in the late 1990s as part of an amendment to the Children's Television Act of 1990 that requires stations to air three hours of educational children's programs every week, regardless of the station's format. Syndication is generally a less expensive option for a local station than to attempt to produce its own locally originated E/I programming; not all networks provide their own E/I programs, so stations that are affiliated with networks that do not carry children's program blocks acquire E/I programs off the syndication market to fulfill the requirements.

==== News programming and late-night talk shows ====
Also in the 1980s, news programming of various sorts began to be offered widely to stations. Independent Network News, which was produced by WPIX in New York City, was a half-hour nightly program that ran from 1980 to 1990 on independent stations (in some markets, INN was paired with a locally produced primetime newscast); CNN would offer a simulcast of programming from its sister network Headline News (now HLN) to broadcast stations later, as did its rival All News Channel, although both were used mainly to fill overnight time periods and were effectively discontinued in syndication when All News Channel folded in 2002 and HLN launched a "Headline Prime" talk show block in 2006. In 2019, NewsNet began offering a similar service to its affiliates. Entertainment Tonight began its long and continuing run as a "soft" news daily strip, with a number of imitations following (among which have included such entertainment news shows as TMZ on TV, Extra and ET's own spin-off The Insider); and "tabloid" television, in the wake of ABC's 20/20 and, more immediately, 20th Television's A Current Affair, would become a syndication staple with such series as Hard Copy and Real TV.

Another area where network dominance was challenged by syndicated programming in the 1980s was with late-night talk shows; The Arsenio Hall Show was the only very successful one (it would be canceled after five years in 1994 due to ratings declines spurred by many CBS affiliates pushing the show to later timeslots following the debut of the Late Show with David Letterman, and was later revived in 2013), but similar programs were attempted such as Alan Thicke's earlier short-lived Thicke of the Night, Lauren Hutton's innovatively shot Lauren Hutton and..., and talk shows hosted by Dennis Miller, Whoopi Goldberg, David Brenner and Keenen Ivory Wayans; Magic Johnson's The Magic Hour was seen as a massive flop, similar to Thicke of the Night. The popularity of syndicated talk shows fell dramatically in the mid-1990s as network and cable offerings expanded in the wake of Johnny Carson's retirement.

==== Reality and live-action children's shows ====
Long before their popularity on network television from the 2000s onward, reality competition shows in one form or another, such as Star Search and American Gladiators, enjoyed popularity in syndication as early as the mid-1980s. Since the now-defunct networks UPN and The WB began offering their affiliates additional nights of prime time programming in the late 1990s, there have been fewer first-run scripted series in syndication, at least, in the U.S.; much as with the closing of windows that provided opportunity for Ziv in the 1950s and various producers in the early 1970s. The more expensive dramatic projects are less attractive to syndicators (particularly when they might be sold, with somewhat less risk, to cable channels); "reality" series such as Cheaters and Maximum Exposure and several dating series began to be more common in the early 2000s. Some of the more low-key programs in this category were designed to appeal to children, such as Beakman's World, Disney's Sing Me A Story with Belle, Animal Rescue and Jack Hanna's Animal Adventures. They were able to get significant clearance because of stricter Federal Communications Commission (FCC) enforcement of rules on children's television programming.

==== Game shows ====
Several game shows are currently syndicated; historically, the most popular have been Wheel of Fortune and the current version of Jeopardy!, both created by television personality Merv Griffin, respectively premiering in 1983 and 1984. The shows have been No. 1 and No. 2 or No. 1 to No. 3 in the syndication ratings consistently since at least the late 1980s. In fact, according to the Guinness Book of World Records, Wheel is the most popular syndicated television program both within and outside the United States. Family Feud, created by Mark Goodson and Bill Todman, ended its first syndication run in 1985. Three years later, a revival of the program featuring Ray Combs as host became a moderate hit and continued for seven seasons, its last year featuring the return of original host Richard Dawson in a failed attempt to save the series. A third revival hit the airwaves in 1999 and has gone through four hosts. The first three hosts (Louie Anderson, Richard Karn and John O'Hurley) struggled in their respective runs and only lasted three to four years. The current run of the program, hosted by Steve Harvey, has been a major ratings success; on the week of June 12, 2015, for the first time ever, Family Feud was the highest-rated syndicated program in terms of average household ratings.

While the current version of The Price Is Right (another Goodson-Todman game show) has enjoyed tremendous success on the CBS daytime schedule since its inception in 1972 under hosts Bob Barker and Drew Carey, it has also produced three spinoffs, two of which failed after one season. The most successful syndicated edition was the 1972–80 weekly version that was initially hosted by Dennis James, but in 1977, daytime host Bob Barker also hosted the nighttime version for the final three seasons. For the 1985–86 season, Tom Kennedy hosted a daily syndicated version, and in 1994–95, Doug Davidson emceed his own daily syndicated version, titled The New Price Is Right. Unlike the daytime series, which expanded to its current one-hour length in 1975, the syndicated versions of Price were 30 minutes long. A Hollywood Squares revival also thrived beginning in 1998 under host Tom Bergeron, running six seasons until its 2004 cancellation. By far the most successful entry into the market in the 2000s has been the daily version of Who Wants to Be a Millionaire, which premiered in September 2002 and was canceled in May 2019 after 17 seasons in syndication (and a total run of 20 seasons dating back to the show's premiere in August 1999).

Because game shows are very inexpensive to produce, with many episodes completed each day of production, successful ones are very profitable; for example, in 1988 Jeopardy! cost an estimated $5 million to produce but earned almost $50 million in revenue. New game show concepts (that is, not based on an existing or pre-existing format) are rarely tried and usually unsuccessful in syndication; somewhat of an exception to this was Street Smarts, which lasted from 2001 to 2006 (despite the series airing in late night slots in many markets). Between 2003 and 2007, no new game shows debuted in syndication, marking four consecutive seasons where no new shows with that genre debuted, a syndication first. That streak ended with the fall 2007 debuts of Temptation and Merv Griffin's Crosswords, bringing the daytime tally to six game shows; both ended production after one year, though Crosswords aired in reruns in some cities during the 2008–09 season before those reruns moved exclusively to cable.

More new shows were added for the 2008–09 fall season, including a daytime run of Deal or No Deal (which featured certain elements that differed from the show's franchised format, most notably with prospective players instead of models holding briefcases that held the monetary amounts) and an adaptation of the popular board game Trivial Pursuit. While Deal or No Deal caught on and was renewed for the 2009–2010 season, Trivial Pursuit: America Plays suffered low ratings throughout its run and was canceled.

For the 2009–2010 season, the Fox game show Are You Smarter than a 5th Grader? moved to syndication with a new, less expensive format. Don't Forget the Lyrics! followed for the 2010–2011 season. Deal, suffering from falling ratings, was canceled in February 2010, with the final episodes airing in late May of that same year; it would later be revived by CNBC in 2018. 5th Grader and Don't Forget the Lyrics! were canceled the following year for the same reason (although 5th Grader would later be revived by Fox and Nickelodeon on two different occasions). Reruns of the popular Discovery Channel show Cash Cab began airing in syndication in January 2011. Reruns of the GSN dating game show Baggage first aired in syndication as a test run in early 2011 on stations owned by the Sinclair Broadcast Group, which preceded its full launch into other markets in fall 2012; although it was removed from syndication after one season.

The 2014–15 season saw the introduction of Celebrity Name Game, hosted by former The Late Late Show host Craig Ferguson; the series was renewed for a second season in January 2015, while Ferguson would also win a Daytime Emmy Award for Daytime Emmy Award for Outstanding Game Show Host for his work on the program. In January 2016, Fox owned-and-operated stations began a test run of South of Wilshire—a game show produced by TMZ. The 2017 summer season includes the game show iWitness created by TV judge Judith Sheindlin. 2021 saw the debut of a revival of You Bet Your Life that reunited host Jay Leno and sidekick Kevin Eubanks from their time on The Tonight Show; it ran two seasons, before Leno left during the 2023 Hollywood labor disputes. 2022 saw the debut of a televised edition of the hit board game Pictionary, and 2023 saw the debut of two new games, Person, Place or Thing and Who the Bleep Is That. Who the Bleep Is That was cancelled in January 2024, while Pictionary and Person, Place or Thing were both cancelled in January 2025.

==== Stripped talk shows ====
The dominant form of first-run syndication in the U.S. for the last three decades has been the "stripping" (or "strip") talk show, such as Donahue, Oprah, The Tyra Banks Show, and Jerry Springer. Strip programming is a technique used for scheduling television and radio programming to ensure consistency and coherency. Strip programming is used to deliver consistent content to targeted audiences. Broadcasters know or predict the times at which certain demographics will be listening to or watching their programs and play them at that time.

As with game shows, talk shows are inexpensive to produce and very profitable if successful. They have a disadvantage in that their costs can be higher than some other formats due to the high volume of episodes needed. In many markets, a stripped show will be seen twice daily, usually with different episodes (one being a more recent episode and the other being an episode from a previous season). Sometimes, station groups with more than one station in a market, or a "duopoly", will run one episode of a strip on one of their stations in the morning, and the other available episode on another of their stations that night.

Meanwhile, the popularity of some of the audience-participation talk shows continues to encourage new participants, some of whom, such as Morton Downey Jr. and Rosie O'Donnell, have brief periods of impressive ratings and influence; others, such as Oprah Winfrey and Maury Povich, have a sustained run. A notable scheduling decision was made by KRON-TV in San Francisco: a 2000 dispute with NBC led to that station's disaffiliation from that network after 52 years, and since all the other larger networks were already represented in San Francisco, KRON decided to become one of the largest commercial independent stations by market size on the VHF band in the U.S., and soon tried running Dr. Phil, a popular new stripped series hosted by Winfrey-associate Dr. Phil McGraw, in primetime, with impressive ratings results.

With a general decline in first-run production in the 2020s, syndicators and stations have turned to reruns of stripped talk shows to fill time slots, with observers noting that conflict-driven tabloid shows tend to draw higher ratings in reruns than non-tabloid shows.

=== 2000s ===
First-run syndicated shows in the United States include talk shows (e.g., The Dr. Oz Show, Dr. Phil, The Real, The Doctors, The Ellen DeGeneres Show & The Kelly Clarkson Show); tabloid/newsmagazine shows (e.g., TMZ Live); crime/law enforcement shows (e.g., Crime Watch Daily); game shows (e.g., Hollywood Squares, Funny You Should Ask, Family Feud, Concentration (game show), Jeopardy! and Wheel of Fortune); court shows (e.g., Judge Judy, Judge Mathis, Judge Jerry, Judge Faith, Protection Court, Hot Bench, America's Court with Judge Ross, and The People's Court); and sitcoms (e.g., The First Family).

== Influence on television schedules ==
The emergence of barter syndication in the 1980s caused the number of independent stations to grow from fewer than 100 in 1980 to 328 as of 1986, as they did not need cash for programming. With the loosening of FCC regulations and the creation of new additional broadcast networks (such as The CW Plus and MyNetworkTV), most of these independents have joined one or another of these or smaller (religious or low-budget) networks.

In other cases, like those of KCAL-TV in Los Angeles, KMCI-TV in Lawrence-Kansas City and WMLW-TV in Racine-Milwaukee, those independent stations are used to complement their network-affiliated sister station (respectively in the mentioned cases, KCBS-TV, KSHB-TV and WDJT-TV) by allowing a duopoly control of more syndicated programming than would be possible on one station (and to spread it throughout the schedule of the two stations, often several times a day), or to air news programming in times unavailable on the larger network station, along with fulfilling network and syndicated programming commitments, which allows popular or network programming to be moved to the independent stations due to breaking news or sports commitments without the traditional inconvenience of a late night or weekend airing of the pre-empted show. A duopoly of a network-affiliated and independent station also allows a network station to move a low-rated syndicated program to their sister independent station to stem revenue losses.

== Off-network syndication ==
Off-network syndication occurs when a network television series is syndicated in packages containing some or all episodes, and sold to as many television stations and markets as possible to be used in local programming timeslots. In this manner, sitcoms are preferred and more successful because they are less serialized, and can be run non-sequentially, which is more beneficial and less costly for the station. In the United States, local stations now rarely broadcast reruns of primetime dramas (or simply air them primarily on weekends); instead, they usually air on basic cable channels, which may air each episode 30 to 60 times.

Syndication rights typically last for six consecutive showings of a series within three to five years; if a program continues to perform well enough in broadcast or cable syndication during the initial cycle, television stations or cable networks can opt to renew an off-network program for an additional cycle.

Syndication has been known to spur the popularity of a series that only experienced moderate success during its network run. The best known example of this is the original Star Trek series, which ran for three seasons on NBC from 1966 to 1969, gaining only modest ratings, but became a worldwide phenomenon after it entered off-network syndication. Its success in syndication led to the Star Trek film series, Star Trek: The Next Generation, and the later versions in the franchise.

It is common for long-running series to have early seasons syndicated while the series itself is still in first-run network production. To differentiate between new and rebroadcast content, until the 1980s it was not uncommon for series to be syndicated under a different title than that used in their original broadcast run. Examples include Bonanza (which was syndicated as Ponderosa), Gunsmoke (as Marshal Dillon, a title still used to differentiate reruns from the early, half-hour episodes of the show from the later one-hour episodes), Emergency! (as Emergency One), Ironside (as The Raymond Burr Show), Hawaii Five-O (as McGarrett), M*A*S*H (as M*A*S*H 4077th), Marcus Welby, M.D. (as Robert Young, Family Doctor), CHiPs (as CHiPs Patrol), Happy Days (as Happy Days Again), and The Andy Griffith Show (as Andy of Mayberry).

Syndication of older episodes can also increase exposure for a television show that is still airing first-run network episodes. In the case of the CBS sitcom The Big Bang Theory, its syndication, particularly on TBS, is one of the reasons attributed for a rise in first-run ratings for its sixth season. The sixth-season episode "The Bakersfield Expedition", for example, was the first episode of that series to attract 20 million viewers.

=== Strip/daily syndication ===
Off-network syndication can take several forms. The most common form is known as strip syndication or daily syndication, when episodes of a television series are shown daily five times a week in the same time slot. In the 1960s and 1970s, independent stations with no news departments began viewing strip syndication as a necessary means of obtaining effective counterprogramming to the local news programs airing on network affiliates. Typically, this means that enough episodes must exist (88 episodes, or four seasons, is the usual minimum, though many syndicators prefer a fully rounded 100 episodes) to allow for continual strip syndication to take place over the course of several months, without episodes being repeated. However, there are exceptions, such as the 65-episode block (common in children's programming), which allows for a 13-week cycle of daily showings, so there will only be four repeats in a year.

In some cases, more than one episode is shown daily. Half-hour sitcoms are sometimes syndicated in groups of two or four episodes, taking up one or two hours of broadcast time. If a series is not strip syndicated, it may be aired once a week, instead of five times a week. This allows shows with fewer episodes to last long in syndication, but it also may mean viewers will tire of waiting a week for the next episode of a show they have already seen and stop watching. More often, hour-long dramas in their first several runs in syndication are offered weekly; sitcoms are more likely to get stripped. In recent years, there has been something of a trend toward showing two consecutive episodes of a program on Saturday and Sunday nights after prime time (generally following the local news). This pattern has been particularly prominent for shows which are still in production but have run long enough to have many previous episodes available.

As with commercial stations, not all the airtime nor all the perceived audience are met by the productions offered U.S. public-broadcasting stations by PBS; additionally, there are some independent public television stations in the U.S. which take no programming from that (somewhat) decentralized network. As a result, there are several syndicators of programming for the non-profit stations, several of which are descendants of the regional station groups which combined some, not all, of their functions into the creation of PBS in 1969. American Public Television (APT) is the largest of these, nearly matched by the National Educational Telecommunications Association (NETA, a merger of Southern Educational Communications Association and the Pacific Mountain Network). The now defunct Continental Program Marketing was another of the syndicator-descendants (of the Northeastern, Southeastern, and Rocky Mountain educational networks, respectively) of the pre-PBS era. Among the other notable organizations in the U.S. are Westlink Satellite Operations (based at Albuquerque's KNME) and Executive Program Services.

Off-network syndication in its various forms, including Internet, international and traditional direct-to-station sales, constitute roughly half of an individual television program's overall revenue stream, with the other half taken up by advertising.

== Monetary rates ==
In 1993, Universal Television became one of the first studios to cash in on the cable trend, first selling repeats of Major Dad to USA Network in 1993 for $600,000 per episode, the first time a network program was exclusively sold to a cable network for its first run rights. Later it sold reruns of Law & Order to A&E for about $155,000 an episode; in 1996, the studio got $275,000 from USA Network for repeats of New York Undercover, a far less successful show. Law & Order drew A&E's highest daytime ratings – one million viewers per episode.

Universal sold reruns of Xena: Warrior Princess and Hercules: The Legendary Journeys to USA Network for $300,000 each. Paramount Network bought The Dukes of Hazzard from Warner Bros. in 1997 for over $10 million. USA Network paid $750,000 for the rights to Walker, Texas Ranger; while USA's reruns of the show drew an average of 2.3 million viewers, Perth says the show will need "an enormous number of airings to have any sort of profitability."

=== Dramatic reruns: rerun prices ===
Sources: Industry sources and Paul Kagan Associates, Inc. Per episode

Year sold	Show	Studio	Cable network	Price*
1986	Falcon Crest	Warner Bros. Television Studios	Turner Broadcasting	$10,000
1986	Knots Landing	Warner Bros. Television	Turner Broadcasting	$12,000
1988	Murder, She Wrote	Universal Television	USA Network	$525,000
1991	Unsolved Mysteries	HBO Distribution	Lifetime	$180,000
1993	The Commish	ABC Productions	Lifetime	$195,000
1994	Law & Order	Universal Television	A&E	$155,000
1995	Melrose Place	CBS Studios	E!	$200,000
1995	Picket Fences	20th Television	FX	$190,000
1995	Lois & Clark: The New Adventures of Superman	Warner Bros. Domestic Television Distribution	TNT	$275,000
1995	Dr. Quinn, Medicine Woman	CBS Studios	CBS	$250,000
1995	NYPD Blue	20th Television	FX	$400,000
1996	Xena: Warrior Princess	Universal Television	USA	$300,000
1996	Hercules: The Legendary Journeys	Universal Television	USA	$300,000
1996	Chicago Hope	20th Television	Lifetime	$475,000
1996	Homicide: Life on the Street	Universal Television	Lifetime	$425,000
1996	The X-Files	20th Television	FX	$600,000
1996	Walker, Texas Ranger	CBS Studios/Sony Pictures Television	USA	$750,000
1996	ER	Warner Bros. Domestic Television Distribution	TNT	$1.2 million

Not all programs in syndication are sold for a fee. Less popular programming may be distributed by barter, in which the syndicator, instead of selling the show to a station, offers the show for free, with the caveat that the station give up its advertising time on other shows to the syndicator's advertisers. Barter syndication, in addition to the cost advantage, is popular because of its flexibility; a station can typically pick up a barter syndicated program for only a few weeks or months, without the long-term financial commitment of a traditional syndicated series, allowing the station to plug the show into its lineup to fill a hole in the schedule.

== Types of deals ==
Cash deals are when a distributor offers a syndicated program to the highest bidder. A cash plus deal is when the distributor retains advertising space to offset some of the cost for the program. The station gets the program for a little less in exchange for some ad space for the producer.

Barter deals are usually for new untested shows or older shows. In this type of deal, distributors get a fraction of the advertisement revenue in exchange for their program. For example, in a 7/5 deal the producer gets seven minutes of advertising time, leaving five minutes for the station to insert local as well as national advertisements.

== Radio syndication ==
Radio syndication generally works the same way as television syndication, except that radio stations usually are not organized into strict affiliate-only networks. Radio networks generally are only distributors of radio shows, and individual stations (though often owned by large conglomerates) decide which shows to carry from a wide variety of networks and independent radio providers. As a result, radio networks such as Westwood One or Premiere Networks, despite their influence in broadcasting, are not as recognized among the general public as television networks like CBS or ABC (many of these distributors ally themselves with television networks; Westwood One, for instance, is allied with NBC News, while Premiere is allied with Fox). Some examples of widely syndicated commercial broadcasting music programs include weekly countdowns like Rick Dees' Weekly Top 40, the American Top 40, American Country Countdown with Kix Brooks, Canada's Top 20 Countdown, the Canadian Hit 30 Countdown and the nightly program, Delilah, heard on many U.S. stations.

Syndication is particularly popular in talk radio. While syndicated music shows (with the exception of some evening and overnight shows such as Delilah mentioned above) tend to air once a week and are mostly recorded, most popular talk radio programs are syndicated daily and are broadcast live. Also, with relatively few 24-hour live talk radio networks (though this, in recent times, has been changing), most radio stations are free to assemble their own lineup of talk show hosts as they so choose. Examples of syndicated talk programs are Premiere Networks' The Bob & Tom Show, Dial Global's The Jim Bohannon Show, and the self-syndicated The Dave Ramsey Show (more recently, talk networks such as Talk Radio Network have been marketing and packaging all-day lineups, marking a departure from the syndication model; as such, popular shows such as Cumulus Media Networks' The Savage Nation and Premiere's The Rush Limbaugh Show now air as part of a broader network lineup in many markets, particularly on Premiere owned-and-operated stations, though they continue to be syndicated to non-network stations as well). Talk syndication tends to be more prevalent because voice tracking, a practice used by many music stations to have disc jockeys host multiple supposedly local shows at once, is not feasible with live talk radio.

National Public Radio, Public Radio International, and American Public Media all sell programming to local member stations in the U.S., most of which are subsidized through the Corporation for Public Broadcasting but operated by private nonprofit organizations, universities, state or local governments. This is in contrast to centralized public radio networks in other countries (such as Canada's CBC, Australia's ABC and the United Kingdom's BBC) that own and operate all of their stations as arms of the national government and run them as a strict network (from 1948 to 2013, the United States had a strict anti-propaganda law, the Smith–Mundt Act, that prohibited broadcasting government-owned networks such as Voice of America to American audiences. The law was mostly repealed in 2013, but distribution of VOA or other federally produced radio programming is still rare). Two independently produced, non-commercial syndicated programs, heard on hundreds of community radio and indie radio stations, are Alternative Radio and Democracy Now!. Some (in fact, most) radio programs are also offered on a barter system usually at no charge to the radio station. The system is used for live programming or preproduced programs and include a mixture of ad time sold by the program producer as well as time set aside for the radio station to sell.

=== History ===
Before radio networks matured in the United States, some early radio shows were reproduced on transcription disks and mailed to individual stations. An example of syndication using this method was RadiOzark Enterprises, Inc. based in Springfield, Missouri, co-owned with KWTO. The Assembly of God, with national headquarters in Springfield, sponsored a half-hour program on the station called Sermons in Song. RadiOzark began transcribing the show for other stations in the 1940s, and eventually 200 stations carried the program. The company later produced country music programs starring among others, Smiley Burnette, George Morgan, Bill Ring and Tennessee Ernie Ford (260 15-minute episodes of The Tennessee Ernie Show were distributed), and more than 1,200 U.S. and Canadian stations aired the programs. Many syndicated radio programs were distributed through the U.S. mail or another delivery service, although the medium changed as technology developed, going from transcription disks to phonograph records, tape recordings, cassette tapes and eventually CDs. Many smaller weekend programs still use this method to this day, though with the rise of the Internet, many stations have since opted to distribute programs via CD-quality MP3s through FTP downloads.

It was not until the advent of communications satellite in the 1980s that live syndication became popular (though it could be transmitted through network lines, it was not particularly common because of cost, network congestion and quality issues). Since then, most syndicated radio programs are distributed using satellite subcarrier audio technology. Shortly after satellite networks such as RKO, Transtar, and SMN began, the Fairness Doctrine was repealed, which is credited with helping Rush Limbaugh become the first national talk radio superstar. At the same time, the FCC began issuing more FM broadcasting licenses to suburban and rural areas in the late 1980s, which allowed more room for music stations on the FM dial; radio formats such as country music that were traditionally AM fixtures even after most pop and rock music moved to FM were now moving to FM as well, leaving much more room for talk formats on the AM dial. As the 1990s went on, Laura Schlessinger and Howard Stern began their national shows, rising to become national icons. The Telecommunications Act of 1996, which led to significant concentration of media ownership, facilitated the rapid deployment of both existing and new syndicated programs in the late 1990s, putting syndication on par with, and eventually surpassing, the network radio format.

After the September 11 attacks, syndicated talk radio saw a notably rapid rise in popularity, as networks rushed new national shows into syndication to meet the demand for discussion of national issues. Many of these, such as Laura Ingraham, Bill O'Reilly, Sean Hannity and Glenn Beck, were mostly supportive of the actions of the Republican-led government; a few others, such as Alex Jones, were openly critical of the government's actions and motives. After the Democrats took control in the late 2000s, the gap between the two styles narrowed due to the mutual opposition of both camps to the government's actions, which allowed Jones greater clearance on stations.

In contrast to conservative talk radio, which has predominantly been driven by syndication, progressive talk radio has almost always been a network-driven model. The incompatibility of conservative and progressive ideologies and the lack of syndicated progressive hosts required solutions that could produce all-day programming to individual stations. It was not until Air America Radio launched in 2004 that progressive talk would become viable; though it failed several years later, Dial Global now carries a network slate that is carried on most progressive talk stations. Sports radio is likewise mostly a network phenomenon, partially because the irregular nature of sports pre-emptions makes having a full-time network to be able to cut into and join in progress at any time highly convenient. Syndicated radio is not as popular in other parts of the world. Canada has a few independently syndicated shows, but the bulk of syndicated content there comes from the United States, and the sum total of syndicated programming is far less than most American stations, as Canadian stations rely more heavily on local content. Most other countries still follow the network radio model.

== International syndication ==
Syndication also applies to international markets. Same language countries often syndicate programs to each other – such as programs from the United Kingdom being syndicated to Australia and vice versa. Another example would be programs from the United Kingdom, Mexico, Brazil, and Argentina being syndicated to local television stations in the United States, and programs from the United States being syndicated elsewhere in the world. One of the best-known internationally syndicated television series has been The Muppet Show, which was produced by Grade's British ITV franchise company ATV at Elstree Studios in Hertfordshire, and was shown around the world, including the United States, where it aired in syndication (including the owned-and-operated stations of CBS), and Canada, where CBC Television aired the show. The 1970s was a time when many British comedies, including The Benny Hill Show and Monty Python's Flying Circus were syndicated to the United States and worldwide. Many soaps and long-running series are also successfully syndicated around the globe.

The television show CSI: Crime Scene Investigation earned $1.6 million per episode in its first cycle in cable syndication. There were many different versions of the show making it an international success. It was already popular in the U.S., so becoming a success internationally as well as within the U.S. made syndication sensible. Whether a series is produced in the U.S. or not is based on the economic value and potential viability of its sales internationally with the possibility of syndication.

Economic factors that influence production outside the U.S. play a major role in deciding if a television show will be syndicated, internally and internationally. International syndication has sustained a growing of prosperity and monetary value amongst the distributors who sell to them. Due to a rise in competition, syndicators have upheld high standards for different countries to buy the rights to distribute shows. During the 1990s poor ratings were common amongst syndicated shows, but distributors still made it possible for international competition to happen and buy U.S. shows. Colombian, Brazilian, Mexican and Venezuelan telenovelas are programmed throughout the Portuguese and Spanish-speaking world, and in many parts of India, Philippines, China and Europe, while Turkish television drama is broadcast in the Balkans, some other European countries, Western and Central Asia and North Africa.

=== American-style syndication internationally ===
Because of the structural differences discussed above, there are presently very few areas where a true American-style syndication model operates, whereby programs are sold on a per-area basis (within a single country) to local or regional stations with differing (or no) network affiliations. Canada was historically one of the few exceptions. Until the mid-1990s, television stations in Canada, like those in the U.S., were typically run as separate local operations, with a small number of moderately sized ownership groups such as Baton, Canwest, WIC, and CHUM. Those stations that were affiliated with a national network, i.e. CBC or CTV, did not always receive a full schedule of programming from that network.

At this time, it was not uncommon for American syndicators to treat Canada as an extension of their domestic syndication operations, for both their first-run and off-network offerings. This is still the case for American radio programs; Canadian radio networks are not assembled as rigidly into networks (except for the CBC's radio division). However, an alternate form of first-run syndication was performed by some domestic broadcasters: as the Canadian rights to American primetime series were often acquired by individual station groups (as opposed to full-fledged national networks), they would in turn resell local rights for those programs to stations in areas where they did not operate. A few of Canada's independent stations, most notably CHCH-TV and CITY-TV, also resyndicated their own locally produced programs to other television stations. Unlike in the United States, however, few Canadian programs were ever created solely for syndication without officially belonging to at least one specific station or network; those that did exist were intended primarily to be syndicated into the American system, and even those were typically distributed in Canada as "network" programs rather than being sold to individual stations.

Since the late 1990s, as most stations have been consolidated into national networks consisting almost entirely of owned-and-operated stations and with full-day network schedules, both types of syndication have largely disappeared from the Canadian broadcast landscape. Programs that are sold in syndication in the U.S. are now generally sold to Canadian media groups to air across all their properties, with per-market sales now being very rare. For example, American shows that air in syndication in the United States, such as Live with Kelly and Mark or The Ellen DeGeneres Show, air in Canada as core parts of the CTV Television Network schedule. The Oprah Winfrey Show appears to have been the last significant holdout to this model, having aired primarily on CTV stations, but in some markets airing instead on a Global station, and even some CBC affiliates.

One syndication service remains in Canada, Yes TV, which serves the few remaining independent stations in the country with mostly American programs (Judge Judy, Wheel of Fortune and Jeopardy! are currently syndicated in Canada through Yes TV). These independent stations can also secure deals with American syndicators; CHCH, for example, has a direct deal with 20th Television to carry some of that company's classic sitcoms, including those from the MTM Enterprises library. They were also, in 1986, largely involved in production of the final incarnation of Split Second game show, which was syndicated in U.S. by Viacom.

== Regional syndication ==
There are three key reasons why a radio station will decide to pick up a syndicated show – the program is unique and has difficult to replicate content, has a decent ratings track record or offers a celebrity host. New developing radio programs are generally able to claim one of these attributes, but not all three. Regional syndication attempts to replace these benchmark attributes with other benefits that are generally recognized by the industry as also being important. Given the financial downturn within the industry, the need for quality cost effective locally relevant programming is greater than ever before. Programs that offer regionally specific content while providing the economic benefits of syndication can be especially appealing to potential affiliates. Regional syndication can also be more attractive to area advertisers who share a common regional trading area versus assembling a radio network of stations that hopscotch across the United States.

== See also ==
- 100 episodes
- Direct-to-video
- First run (filmmaking)
- Flagship (broadcasting)
- Print syndication
- Rerun
- Syndication exclusivity
- Video on demand
- Web syndication
