= Sun Gym gang =

Gang in Miami, Florida during the 1990s

The Sun Gym gang was active in the Miami, Florida area, during the mid-1990s and were responsible for the murders of Frank Griga and Krisztina Furton along with the kidnapping, extortion, and attempted murder of Marc Schiller. The gang was composed mostly of bodybuilders who frequented the Sun Gym in North Miami, Florida, including Daniel Lugo and Noel "Adrian" Doorbal.

Pete Collins published a three-part series in the Miami New Times in 1999 and 2000 chronicling the stories of the gang titled "Pain and Gain" which was then loosely adapted into the 2013 film Pain & Gain directed by Michael Bay.

== Origins ==
In 1991, Jorge Delgado and Marc Schiller had become business partners and friends. Schiller trusted Delgado so much that Delgado knew the alarm code and layout of Schiller's home. In 1993, Delgado met Daniel Lugo, the manager of the Sun Gym, a bodybuilder hangout in North Miami who had been recently hired by the gym's owner, John Mese. Delgado hired Lugo as his personal trainer and the two became close friends. It was Delgado's relationship with Lugo that caused a rift between Delgado and Schiller. Lugo had convinced Delgado that Schiller was cheating him out of company profits. Prior to working at the Sun Gym, Lugo had been convicted in 1991 of fraud and served a fifteen-month sentence in addition to a three-year federal probation period. Lugo had pretended to be part of a Hong Kong bank looking to invest in American small businesses. The scheme involved collecting up-front fees for loan insurance and then not delivering any business loans.

Noel "Adrian" Doorbal worked part-time at the gym alongside Lugo. In 1994, Carl Weekes moved from New York City to Miami to live with his girlfriend's cousin, Stevenson Pierre. Pierre had been hired by Lugo in February 1994 to create a collection agency for overdue gym membership payments. When this didn't work out, he remained at the gym first as the back-office manager in the weight room before ending up as a desk clerk.

== Crimes ==
=== Winston Lee ===
In 1994 Daniel Lugo planned to extort and kidnap Winston Lee, a Jamaican man who frequented Sun Gym. However, this plan never transpired.

=== The abduction and extortion of Marc Schiller ===
In a 1994 meeting, Daniel Lugo asked Noel "Adrian" Doorbal and Stevenson Pierre whether they were interested in making $100,000 for two days' work. According to Lugo, businessman Marc Schiller had stolen $100,000 from him and $200,000 from another gym member named Jorge Delgado. At another meeting a few days later, Delgado agreed to the plan to abduct Schiller and force him to sign over his assets, and potentially kill him. Delgado was able to give specific information about Schiller, including the codes to his house.

The gang had varying plans and made attempts to kidnap Schiller. They planned to wear ninja outfits for Halloween and knock on Schiller's door; this plan did not transpire. On an early morning in November, Doorbal, Pierre, and Weekes, dressed in black and wearing gloves and black military camouflage makeup, crawled across the lawn, planning to storm the house when Schiller went to get the papers. However, a passing car scared them off.

In total, there were seven failed abductions. The final failed abduction occurred on Thursday, November 14, 1994. After this last failed attempt, Doorbal and Weekes dropped Pierre and recruited Mario Sanchez, or "Big Mario," a former Sun Gym weightlifting instructor and licensed Florida private eye.

That same afternoon, Schiller was waiting for a prospective buyer at a Schlotzsky's franchise delicatessen he owned. When, at 4 pm, the buyer still had not turned up, Schiller left and was grabbed by three men while walking across the parking lot, who stunned him with tasers and then punched him and forced him into a van. The Sun Gym gang then took Schiller to Delgado's warehouse. That evening, they retrieved Schiller's car from the Deli parking lot and drove it to the warehouse. That first evening the gang made Schiller call his wife and tell her to go with his children to Colombia, giving the gang access to his house. For weeks, the gang made Schiller tell a series of stories and, under pressure, sign over all of his assets, making dozens of requests for his signatures. Initially planned as a two-day abduction, the abduction went over weeks as they converted assets from Switzerland and the Cayman Islands. The last money transfer was made on December 10. Finally, the gang decided they would kill Schiller with a 2 million dollars MetLife Insurance policy designated to Lugo's ex-wife Lillian Torres as the new beneficiary.

The gang planned to get Schiller drunk over a few days and send him out in his car in a fatal crash. At 2:30 am on December 15, after three days of forced drinking, Schiller was placed into the passenger seat of his car with Lugo driving while Weekes and Doorbal followed in a Camry. A crash site was chosen three blocks south of Schlotzky's. Schiller was then strapped into the driver's seat, and Lugo moved into the passenger side and stomped the gas pedal and steered the vehicle toward a concrete utility pole jumping out just before the collision. When Lugo inspected the wreckage, Schiller was alive but unconscious. Lugo then splashed gasoline over him and lit it on fire; however, Schiller opened the door and climbed out of the car. The gang chased him in their cars, running him over twice. They almost went back to hit Schiller for a third time, but another car approached, causing them to run away.

Schiller was admitted into the hospital on December 16, 1994, being treated as a John Doe and possible DUI case. Meanwhile, the Sun Gym Gang, after hearing of no one being admitted into the morgue, started calling the area hospitals. They discovered that Schiller was at Jackson Memorial Hospital and in critical but stable condition. The gang visited the hospital intending to kill Schiller, but Schiller, fearing that he would be discovered there and murdered, checked himself out of the hospital and flew to New York.

By early January 1995, Lugo moved into Schiller's home that D&J International now owned, a Bahamian Company set up by Lugo in the year prior. He told residents of the neighborhood that his name was “Tom” and that he and the other gang members were members of the US Security Forces. According to them, Marc Schiller had run into legal trouble and had been deported along with his family. The house was now confiscated and became government property.

=== Abduction, attempted extortion, and murders of Frank Griga and Krisztina Furton ===
Through Noel "Adrian" Doorbal, the gang were informed of another wealthy man, Hungarian Frank Griga who had made his fortune by running a phone-sex empire. Through a past girlfriend, Doorbal had been introduced to Attila Weiland, who knew Griga and introduced Doorbal and his "cousin" Daniel Lugo to Griga on May 20, 1995. Doorbal convinced Lugo to form a plan to kidnap and extort the couple. At this meeting, Lugo and Doorbal posed as legitimate business men, offering Griga investment opportunities.

Lugo involved his girlfriend, Sabina Petrescu, who believed that Lugo was a Central Intelligence Agency agent and that she was assisting him in his mission to capture a Hungarian businessman who was guilty of using women for sex and circumventing US tax laws.

On May 25, 1995, after several meetings, Doorbal killed Griga during a fight at his apartment. The gang had planned to bring Griga back to a warehouse where they could begin to extort him as they had Schiller; however, they were frustrated in their plan when Doorbal accidentally killed the victim early. Krisztina Furton, Griga's girlfriend, was also at the apartment talking to Lugo in a separate room to Doorbal and Griga. After witnessing her partner murdered, she was injected with Rompun - a horse tranquilliser - by Lugo. The gang began to attempt to extract information from Furton regarding the codes which would grant entry into Griga's home, whilst continuing to inject her with Rompun. After this, Furton stopped supplying them with information. The third dose of tranquilizer was administered, resulting in her death.

The next day – May 26, 1995 – Griga's body was concealed in Marc Schiller's stolen couch and Furton's body in a U-Haul clothing box. Both were placed into the back of a van, and Delgado, Lugo, and Doorbal drove to Lugo's Hialeah warehouse. It was here that the gang dismembered and disposed of the bodies of Griga and Furton, with Doorbal doing most of the work.

== Downfall ==
After his ordeal, Marc Schiller hired Miami private investigator Ed Du Bois to investigate his kidnapping and missing finances. At the same time, he remained in Colombia. When Du Bois initially brought Schiller's ordeal to the Miami police, they were skeptical and didn't believe Schiller's story, and only made minor inquiries into the case.

The morning after the disappearance of Griga and Furton, housekeeper Eszter Toth arrived at Griga's house. She was shocked to find their dog barking unattended, sparking her suspicions. She acquired the help of Judi Bartusz — a friend of Furton — and the two entered the empty house together. Shortly following, Bartusz contacted their mutual Hungarian friends in the Miami area to see if they knew the couple's whereabouts. After some time, the Golden Beach Police Department were called. At 7:30 am, on May 31, 1995, Lloyd Alvarez, a friend of Griga's, spotted Griga's yellow Lamborghini travelling in a convoy between two other cars. He followed the trio of cars, and recognised Daniel Lugo in the Mercedes. Beatriz Weiland and Attila Weiland were contacted by police, who began speaking to them.

Eight days after the disappearance of Griga and Furton, Capt. Al Harper phoned Ed Du Bois and they began to collaborate on the police investigation. On Friday June 2, Marc Schiller returned to Miami, two months after he had first told investigators his story. The next morning, Metro–Dade police served warrants on the houses of Daniel Lugo, Jorge Delgado, Noel "Adrian" Doorbal and Sun Gym owner John Mese. Lugo had already fled to the Bahamas, but was arrested five days later in Nassau by a multi-agency task force, who brought him back on a commercial flight to Miami.

On June 10, Lugo agreed to reveal the hiding place of the bodies in return for the police mentioning his helpfulness to a jury. He brought them to the submerged barrels in Southwest Miami. However, the drums did not contain the victims' heads, hands, and feet which were crucial to the identification. Following this event, Lugo ceased cooperation with the police.

The body of Furton was later identified through her breast implants' serial number, which was matched to the records held by her plastic surgeon. A month later, information that the missing body parts could be found in Alligator Alley was supplied by an anonymous caller.

Police also arrested Carl Weekes and Stevenson Pierre. John Mese was returned to police custody after the initial interrogation. Sabina Petrescu and Cindy Eldridge also faced charges.

== Trial and convictions ==
The trials of Daniel Lugo, Noel "Adrian" Doorbal and John Mese occurred simultaneously with two juries picked - one listening to the evidence against Lugo and a second to listen to the evidence against Doorbal and Mese. The trial, which began on February 24, 1996 was the longest and most expensive criminal trial in the history of Dade County. It featured more than 1200 pieces of physical evidence and 98 witnesses.

=== Daniel Lugo ===
On October 2, 1996, Daniel Lugo was indicted on 46 counts and pleaded guilty to all of the charges of indictment, these were: (VII-7- missing. 45 counts.)

Count I Conspiracy to Commit Racketeering

Count II Racketeering

Count III First-Degree Murder (Furton)

Count IV First-Degree Murder (Griga)

Count V Kidnapping

Count VI Kidnapping

Count VIII Attempted Extortion

Count IX Grand Theft Auto

Count X Attempted First-Degree Murder

Count XI Armed Kidnapping

Count XII Armed Robbery

Count XIII Burglary

Count XIV Grand Theft (Second-Degree)

Count XV Grand Theft Auto

Count XVI Possession of an Identification Plate

Count XVII Arson

Count XVIII Extortion

Count XIX Money Laundering (Counts XIX – XXVII)

Count XXVIII Forgery (Counts XXVIII, XXXI, XXXIV, XXVII, XL, XLIII)

Count XXX Uttering a Forged Instrument (Counts XXX, XXIII, XXXVI, IXL, XLII, XLV)

Count XLVI Conspiracy to Commit a First-Degree Felony

Initially sentenced to death, in December 2024, Lugo was re-sentenced to life in prison.

=== Noel "Adrian" Doorbal ===
On October 2, 1996, Doorbal was indicted and sentenced to the following counts on July 17, 1998:

Count I Conspiracy to Commit Racketeering – 30 years

Count II Racketeering – Life Imprisonment

Count III First-Degree Murder (Furton) – Death

Count IV First-Degree Murder (Griga) – Death

Count V Kidnapping – Life imprisonment

Count VI Kidnapping – Life imprisonment

Count VIII Attempted Extortion – 5 years

Count IX Grand Theft Auto – 5 years

Count X Attempted First-Degree Murder – Life imprisonment

Count XI Armed Kidnapping – Life imprisonment

Count XII Armed Robbery – Life imprisonment

Count XIII Burglary – 15 years

Count XIV Grand Theft (Second-Degree) – 15 years

Count XVII Arson – 30 years

Count XVIII Extortion – 30 years

Count XLVI Conspiracy to Commit a First-Degree Felony – 15 years

Initially sentenced to death, in December 2024, Doorbal was re-sentenced to life in prison.

=== John Mese ===
Mese appealed, and the State cross-appealed the sentence to the Florida District Court of Appeal, Third District. The District Court of Appeal Judge ruled that at trial, the judge had improperly set aside the two Racketeer Influenced and Corrupt Organization convictions and ordered a new sentencing hearing to occur on those counts. On 15 January 2003, Mese was sentenced to 30 years imprisonment for one count of Conspiracy to Commit Racketeering. He died of a stroke in 2004.

=== Jorge Delgado ===
In return for testifying in favor of the state, Delgado was sentenced to two prison terms of 5 and 15 years. He served only seven years in jail and was released from the Everglades Correctional Institution in West Dade on September 27, 2002. In 2008, he was arrested for felony grand theft, receiving one year of probation.

=== John Raimondo ===
Raimondo was indicted on one count each of Conspiracy to Commit Racketeering, First-degree Murder (Furton), Kidnapping (Furton) and attempted extortion. He was convicted of one count of kidnapping and was sentenced to 8 years He was released in 2002.

Following the release of the Pain & Gain film, Raimondo spoke to the Miami New Times about the film, and claimed that Jorge Delgado's testimony exaggerated Raimondo's role in these crimes.
