= List of talk show hosts =

Below is a list of talk show hosts, sorted alphabetically by their surnames.

== A ==
Host	Country	Talk show(s) hosted
Ben Aaron	United States	Pickler & Ben
Kashif Abbasi	Pakistan	Off the Record
Abiola Abrams	United States	My Two Cents, The Source: All Access, Chat Zone
Keith Ablow	United States	The Dr. Keith Ablow Show
Antônio Abujamra	Brazil	Provocações
Boy Abunda	Philippines	Homeboy, Boy & Kris, The Buzz, The Bottomline with Boy Abunda, Aquino & Abunda Tonight, Tonight with Boy Abunda, Fast Talk with Boy Abunda
Michelle Ackerley	United Kingdom	The One Show
Tayshia Adams	United States	Bachelor in Paradise
Marcelo Adnet	Brazil	Adnet ao Vivo, Adnight
Jin Akanishi	Japan	Cartoon KAT-TUN
Farhan Akhtar	India	Oye! It's Friday!
Byron Allen	United States	The Byron Allen Show, Comics Unleashed, Entertainers with Byron Allen, Kickin It' with Byron Allen, The American Athlete
Lexi Allen	United States	The Word Network Church with Lexi, The Lexi Show
Lily Allen	United Kingdom	Lily Allen and Friends
Steve Allen	United States	Tonight Starring Steve Allen, The Steve Allen Show
Faisal al-Qassem	Syria	The Opposite Direction
Nancy Alvarez	United States	¿Quién Tiene la Razón?
Christiane Amanpour	United Kingdom/ Iran	Amanpour, Amanpour & Company
Tamer Amin	Egypt	Elbeet Betak
Eric André	United States	The Eric Andre Show, Mostly 4 Millennials
Angélica	Brazil	Estrelas
Alvin Anthons	Malaysia	"Let's Talk" Radio Televisyen Malaysia
Carly Aquilino	United States	Girl Code Live
Kris Aquino	Philippines	Kris TV
Fernando Arau	Mexico	¡Despierta América!
María Celeste Arrarás	Puerto Rico	Al Rojo Veto, Noticias Telemundo
Raymond Arrieta	Puerto Rico	Día a Día con Raymond y Dagmar
Dr. Jennifer Ashton	United States	The Doctors, The Revolution, GMA3: What You Need To Know
Pinar Atalay	Germany	Pinar Atalay
Scott Aukerman	United States	Comedy Bang! Bang!

== B ==
Host	Country	Talk show(s) hosted
Adrienne Bailon	United States	The Real
Matt Baker	United Kingdom	The One Show
Alec Baldwin	United States	Up Late with Alec Baldwin, The Alec Baldwin Show
Tyra Banks	United States	The Tyra Banks Show, FABLife
Peter Barnes	United States	Capitol Gains
Jillian Barberie	Canada	The Test with Jillian Barberie
Ron Barrier	United States	The Atheist Viewpoint
Drew Barrymore	United States	The Drew Barrymore Show
Yann Barthès	France	Le Petit Journal, Quotidien
Rafinha Bastos	Brazil	Oito Minutos, Agora É Tarde
Bobbie Battista	United States	Talkback Live
Jaime Bayly	Peru	El show de Jaime Bayly, Bayly
Okan Bayülgen	Turkey	Muhabbet Kralı, Zaga
Garcelle Beauvais	Haiti/ United States	The Real
Glenn Beck	United States	Glenn Beck Program
Reinhold Beckmann	Germany	Beckmann
Samantha Bee	Canada	Full Frontal with Samantha Bee
Joy Behar	United States	The View, Joy Behar: Say Anything!, Late Night Joy
Greg Behrendt	United States	The Greg Behrendt Show
Micky Beisenherz	Germany	Kölner Treff
Art Bell	United States	Coast to Coast AM
Lee Phillip Bell	United States	The Lee Phillip Show
W. Kamau Bell	United States	Totally Biased with W. Kamau Bell, United Shades of America
Richard Belzer	United States	The Richard Belzer Show
Graham Bensinger	United States	In Depth with Graham Bensinger
Bob Berkowitz	United States	Real Personal
Nate Berkus	United States	The Nate Berkus Show
Jennifer Berman	United States	The Doctors
Bárbara Bermudo	Puerto Rico	Primer Impacto
Bertice Berry	United States	The Bertice Berry Show
Richard Bey	United States	People Are Talking, The Richard Bey Show
Pedro Bial	Brazil	Na Moral, Conversa com Bial
Jedediah Bila	United States	The View
Alfred Biolek	Germany	Boulevard Bio
J. J. Bittenbinder	United States	Tough Target
Joey Bishop	United States	The Joey Bishop Show
John Bishop	United Kingdom	John Bishop: In Conversation With...
Tempestt Bledsoe	United States	The Tempestt Bledsoe Show
Giselle Blondet	Puerto Rico/ United States	¡Despierta América!
Erich Böhme	Germany	Talk im Turm
Jan Böhmermann	Germany	Neo Magazin Royale
Alexander Bommes	Germany	NDR Talk Show
Dave Bonawits	United States	FishCenter Live
Bill Boggs	United States	Talk Show Confidential
Bettina Böttinger	Germany	B. trifft ..., 'Böttinger, Kölner Treff
Laura Bozzo	Peru	Laura
Wayne Brady	United States	The Wayne Brady Show
Russell Brand	United Kingdom	The Russell Brand Show
Russell Brand	United States	Brand X with Russell Brand
Jonathon Brandmeier	United States	The Jonathon Brandmeier Show
Jim Brandstatter	United States	Michigan Replay
Tamar Braxton	United States	The Real
Trina Braxton	United States	Sister Circle
Anders Breinholt	Denmark	Natholdet
Margaret Brennan	United States	Face the Nation
David Brenner	United States	Nightlife
Carolyn A. Brent	United States	Across the Ages
Michael Brooks	United States	The Michael Brooks Show, The Majority Report
Agnes Brown	United Kingdom	All Round to Mrs. Brown's
Les Brown	United States	The Les Brown Show
Joy Browne	United States	WOR News, The Dr. Joy Browne Show
Karyn Bryant	United States	Talkback Live
Rob Brydon	United Kingdom	The Rob Brydon Show
Joe Buck	United States	Joe Buck Live
William F. Buckley Jr.	United States	Firing Line
Andreu Buenafuente	Spain	Late Motiv
Mike Bullard	Canada	Open Mike with Mike Bullard, The Mike Bullard Show
Pat Bullard	Canada	The Pat Bullard Show
Emma Bunton	United Kingdom	Too Much TV
Candace Cameron Bure	United States	The View
Michael Burger	United States	Mike and Maty, Home & Family
Steve Burns	United States	Blue's Clues
Gay Byrne	(Republic of Ireland) Ireland	The Late Late Show

== C ==
Host	Country	Talk show(s) hosted
Zé do Caixão	Brazil	O Estranho Mundo de Zé do Caixão
Hebe Camargo	Brazil	Hebe
Ana María Canseco	Mexico	¡Despierta América!, El Gordo y la Flaca
Tucker Carlson	United States	Crossfire, Tucker, Tucker Carlson Tonight
Adam Carolla	United States	Loveline, The Man Show, Too Late with Adam Carolla
Alan Carr	United Kingdom	Alan Carr Chatty Man, Alan Carr's Happy Hour
Johnny Carson	United States	The Tonight Show Starring Johnny Carson
Gabrielle Carteris	United States	Gabrielle
Deborah Carthy-Deu	Puerto Rico	Noche de Gala
Boris Casoy	Brazil	Passando a Limpo
Dick Cavett	United States	The Dick Cavett Show
Niti Chaichitathorn	Thailand	Talk-Ka-Toey One Night
Gopinath Chandran	India	Neeya Naana
Gary Chapman	United States	Prime Time Country
Charlie Chase	United States	Crook & Chase
Chevy Chase	United States	The Chevy Chase Show
Julie Chen Moonves	United States	The Talk
Lynne Cheney	United States	Crossfire
Juliya Chernetsky	United States	Fuse Top 20 Countdown
Margaret Cho	United States	All About Sex
Sabine Christiansen	Germany	Sabine Christiansen
Charlotte Church	United Kingdom	The Charlotte Church Show
Rylan Clark-Neal	United Kingdom	Up Late with Rylan
Jeremy Clarkson	United Kingdom	Top Gear
Kelly Clarkson	United States	The Kelly Clarkson Show
Andy Cohen	United States	Watch What Happens Live with Andy Cohen
Stephen Colbert	United States	The Colbert Report, The Late Show with Stephen Colbert
Gary Collins	United States	Home
Justin Lee Collins	United Kingdom	The Justin Lee Collins Show
Michelle Collins	United States	The View, Bachelor in Paradise: After Paradise
Alan Colmes	United States	Hannity & Colmes
Chris Connelly	United States	Unscripted with Chris Connelly, Up Close
Harry Connick Jr.	United States	Harry
Des O'Connor	United Kingdom	The Des O'Connor Show, Des O'Connor Tonight
Anderson Cooper	United States	Anderson Cooper 360°, Anderson Live
James Corden	United Kingdom	James Corden's World Cup Live
James Corden	United States	The Late Late Show with James Corden
Sonya Cortés	Puerto Rico	Anda Pa'l Cará
Rita Cosby	United States	Rita Cosby: Live & Direct
Howard Cosell	United States	SportsBeat
Bob Costas	United States	Later with Bob Costas, On the Record with Bob Costas
Antony Cotton	United Kingdom	That Antony Cotton Show
Katie Couric	United States	Today, Katie
Colin Cowherd	United States	The Herd with Colin Cowherd
Sara Cox	United Kingdom	Too Much TV
Les Crane	United States	The Les Crane Show
Lorianne Crook	United States	Crook and Chase
Monica Crowley	United States	Connected: Coast to Coast
Josh Dela Cruz	United States	Blue's Clues & You!
Bill Cunningham	United States	The Bill Cunningham Show

== D ==
Host	Country	Talk show(s) hosted
Carson Daly	United States	Last Call with Carson Daly, Today, Today's Take
Stuart Damon	United States	America
Dani Daniels	United States	Dinner with Dani
Faith Daniels	United States	A Closer Look with Faith Daniels
Linda Dano	United States	Attitudes
Tony Danza	United States	The Tony Danza Show
John Davidson	United States	The John Davidson Show
Alan Davies	United Kingdom	Alan Davies Après-Ski, Alan Davies: As Yet Untitled
Mark Davis	United States	The Mark Davis Show
Doris Day	United States	Doris Day's Best Friends
Laraine Day	United States	Daydreaming with Laraine
PJ DeBoy	United States	Locker Room
Ellen DeGeneres	United States	The Ellen DeGeneres Show
Marilyn Denis	United States	The Marilyn Denis Show
Michel Denisot	France	Le Grand Journal
Al Denson	United States	The Al Denson Show
Casey DeSantis	United States	First Coast Living
Donny Deutsch	United States	The Big Idea with Donny Deutsch, Saturday Night Politics with Donny Deutsch, (Get to) The Point,
Dreuxilla Divine	Puerto Rico	Sacando Chispa
Delaina Dixon	United States	The Gossip Table
Ryzza Mae Dizon	Philippines	The Ryzza Mae Show
Jack Docherty	United Kingdom	The Jack Docherty Show
Hacker T. Dog	United Kingdom	Hacker Time
Snoop Dogg	United States	Dogg After Dark
Sanja Doležal	Croatia	Sanja
Carmen Dominicci	Puerto Rico	Aquí y Ahora
Phil Donahue	United States	The Phil Donahue Show, Donahue
João Doria	Brazil	Show Business
Mike Douglas	United States	The Mike Douglas Show
Morton Downey Jr.	United States	The Morton Downey Jr. Show
Fran Drescher	United States	The Fran Drescher Show
Matt Drudge	United States	Drudge
Louise DuArt	United States	Living the Life
Barkha Dutt	India	We the People

== E ==
Host	Country	Talk show(s) hosted
George Earth	United States	The Talk Show
Stephanie Edwards	United States	AM America
Steve Edwards	United States	AM Chicago, Friday Night with Steve Edwards, Good Day L.A.
Mona El-Shazly	Egypt	Al-Ashera Masa'an
Gordon Elliott	Australia	The Gordon Elliott Show
Boomer Esiason	United States	Game Time with Boomer Esiason
Michael Essany	United States	The Michael Essany Show
Dame Edna Everage (Barry Humphries)	United Kingdom	The Dame Edna Experience, The Dame Edna Treatment
Chris Evans	United Kingdom	The One Show
Elmo	United States	The Not-Too-Late Show with Elmo
Eve	United States	The Talk

== F ==
Host	Country	Talk show(s) hosted
David Faber	United States	Bull Session
Sándor Fábry	Hungary	Esti Showder
Jimmy Fallon	United States	Late Night with Jimmy Fallon, The Tonight Show Starring Jimmy Fallon
Dave Fanning	(Republic of Ireland) Ireland	The Dave Fanning Show
Barry J. Farber	United States	Diamonds in the Rough
Paula Faris	United States	The View
Antonio Farré	Spain	Él y ella
Spike Feresten	United States	Talkshow with Spike Feresten
Craig Ferguson	United States	The Late Late Show with Craig Ferguson
Cristy Fermin	Philippines	The Buzz
Cristina Ferrare	United States	Home, Home & Family
Larry Finley	United States	The Larry Finley Show
Glen Ford	United States	America's Black Forum
Jack Ford	United States	Living It Up! with Ali & Jack
Matt Forde	United Kingdom	Unspun with Matt Forde
Kirk Fox	United States	The Test
Vivica A. Fox	United States	Face the Truth
Don Francisco	Chile	Sábado Gigante, Don Francisco Presenta, Don Francisco te invita
Bethenny Frankel	United States	Bethenny
Joe Franklin	United States	Joe Franklin's Comedy Club
Rosa-Linda Fregoso	United States	Telecorpus
Adam Friedland	United States	The Adam Friedland Show, Cum Town (formerly)
Will Friedle	United States	Don't Just Sit There!
Michel Friedman	Germany	Vorsicht! Friedman, Friedman, Studio Friedman
David Frost	United Kingdom	The David Frost Show
Jo Frost	United Kingdom	Jo Frost: Family Matters
Alexandra Fuentes	Puerto Rico	Anda Pa'l Cará

== G ==
Host	Country	Talk show(s) hosted
Zach Galifianakis	United States	Late World with Zach, Between Two Ferns with Zach Galifianakis
Simi Garewal	India	Rendezvous with Simi Garewal
Cyndy Garvey	United States	The Morning Show
Akbar Gbaja-Biamila	United States	The Talk
Danilo Gentili	Brazil	Agora É Tarde, The Noite com Danilo Gentili
Wally George	United States	Hot Seat
Ricky Gervais	United Kingdom	Meet Ricky Gervais
Chris Gethard	United States	The Chris Gethard Show
Leeza Gibbons	United States	Leeza, John & Leeza from Hollywood, America Now, My Generation
Mel Giedroyc	United Kingdom	Light Lunch, Mel & Sue
Kathie Lee Gifford	United States	Live with Regis and Kathie Lee, Today, Today with Kathie Lee and Hoda
Sara Gilbert	United States	The Talk
Luciana Gimenez	Brazil	Superpop, Luciana by Night
Greg Giraldo	United States	Friday Night Stand-Up with Greg Giraldo
Robin Givens	United States	Forgive or Forget
Nikki Glaser	United States	Nikki & Sara Live, Not Safe with Nikki Glaser
Trisha Goddard	United Kingdom	Trisha Goddard, The Trisha Goddard Show
Whoopi Goldberg	United States	The Whoopi Goldberg Show, The View
Charlene Gonzalez	Philippines	The Buzz
Ed Gordon	United States	Our World with Black Enterprise
Lou Gordon	United States	The Lou Gordon Program
Judith Grace	Mexico	Casos de Familia
Dave Graveline	United States	Into Tomorrow
Tom Green	Canada	The Tom Green Show, Tom Green's House Tonight
Kathy Griffin	United States	Kathy
Merv Griffin	United States	The Merv Griffin Show
Charles Grodin	United States	The Charles Grodin Show
Serginho Groisman	Brazil	Programa Livre, Altas Horas
John Gruber	United States	The Talk Show podcast
Greg Grunberg	United States	Geeking Out
Avdhoot Gupte	India	Khupte thite Gupte
Greg Gutfeld	United States	The Five, Red Eye, Gutfeld!
Savannah Guthrie	United States	Today

== H ==
Host	Country	Talk show(s) hosted
Britt Hagedorn	Germany	Britt – Der Talk um eins
Sara Haines	United States	The View, GMA Day, GMA3: Strahan & Sara, GMA3: Strahan, Sara & Keke
Arsenio Hall	United States	The Arsenio Hall Show
Tamron Hall	United States	Today's Take, Tamron Hall
Alan Hamel	Canada	The Alan Hamel Show
George Hamilton	United States	George & Alana
Chelsea Handler	United States	Chelsea Lately, The Chelsea Handler Show
Sean Hannity	United States	Hannity & Colmes, Hannity
Aaron Harber	United States	The Aaron Harber Show
Jordan Harbinger	United States	The Jordan Harbinger Show
Chris Hardwick	United States	@midnight with Chris Hardwick, Web Soup, Talking with Chris Hardwick, Talking Bad, Talking Dead
Araya A. Hargate	Thailand	3 Zaap
Matt Harrigan	United States	FishCenter Live
Melissa Harris-Perry	United States	Melissa Harris-Perry
Chris Harrison	United States	Bachelor in Paradise: After Paradise
Tanya Hart	United States	Live from L.A. with Tanya Hart
Steve Harvey	United States	Steve, The Steve Harvey Morning Show, and Steve Harvey
Anu Hassan	India	Koffee with Anu
Elisabeth Hasselbeck	United States	The View
Bobby Heenan	United States	The Bobby Heenan Show
Grace Helbig	United States	The Grace Helbig Show
Florence Henderson	United States	The Florence Henderson Show
Marilu Henner	United States	Marilu
John Henson	United States	Talk Soup
Eva Herman	Germany	NDR Talk Show
Jamie Hersch	United States	Quick Pitch
Hugh Hewitt	United States	The Hugh Hewitt Show
Marc Lamont Hill	United States	VH1 Live!
Adam Hills	Australia	Adam Hills Tonight
Adam Hills	United Kingdom	The Last Leg
Eckart von Hirschhausen	Germany	NDR Talk Show
John Hockenberry	United States	Hockenberry
Jan Hofer	Germany	Riverboat
Werner Höfer	Germany	Frühschoppen
Pete Holmes	United States	The Pete Holmes Show
Margaret Hoover	United States	(Get to) The Point, Firing Line
Sunny Hostin	United States	The View
Rufus Hound	United Kingdom	Too Much TV
Clark Howard	United States	The Clark Howard Show
Mike Huckabee	United States	Huckabee
Juliet Huddy	United States	The Morning Show with Mike and Juliet
D. L. Hughley	United States	The D.L. Hughley Show, D. L. Hughley Breaks the News, Weekends at the D.L.
Jeff Hullinger	United States	Talkback Live
Bonnie Hunt	United States	The Bonnie Hunt Show
Abby Huntsman	United States	The View
Lauren Hutton	United States	Lauren Hutton and...

== I ==
Host	Country	Talk show(s) hosted
Maybrit Illner	Germany	Maybrit Illner
Carrie Ann Inaba	United States	The Talk
Vera Int-Veen	Germany	Vera am Mittag
Laura Ingraham	United States	The Laura Ingraham Show, The Ingraham Angle
Don Imus	United States	Imus in the Morning
Robert Irvine	United States	The Robert Irvine Show

== J ==
Host	Country	Talk show(s) hosted
Dana Jacobson	United States	1st and 10
T. D. Jakes	United States	The T.D. Jakes Show
Rambod Javan	Iran	Khandevane
Jim Jefferies	United States	The Jim Jefferies Show
Herb Jepko	United States	Nitecaps
Mike Jerrick	United States	The Morning Show with Mike and Juliet
Jack E. Jett	United States	The Jack E. Jett Show
Eva Jinek	Netherlands	Jinek
Karan Johar	India	Koffee with Karan
Ernie Johnson Jr.	United States	Listen Up!
Magic Johnson	United States	The Magic Hour
Aled Jones	United Kingdom	Chatterbox, Daybreak, Too Much TV, Weekend
Alex Jones	Wales	The One Show
Alex Jones	United States	The Alex Jones Show
Jenny Jones	Canada/ United States	The Jenny Jones Show
Orlando Jones	United States	The Orlando Jones Show
Star Jones	United States	The View, Star Jones
Rafael José	Puerto Rico	¡Despierta América!
Naomi Judd	United States	Naomi's New Morning
Ana Jurka	Honduras	Titulares y Más
Roberto Justus	Brazil	Roberto Justus +

== K ==
Host	Country	Talk show(s) hosted
Kazuya Kamenashi	Japan	Cartoon KAT-TUN
Rajat Kapoor	India	Lounge
Khloé Kardashian	United States	Kocktails with Khloé
Steve Katsos	United States	The Steve Katsos Show
Carrie Keagan	United States	Big Morning Buzz Live
Gina Keatley	United States	Deliciously Diverse: Malaysia, Good Day New York
Max Kellerman	United States	Around the Horn, SportsNation
Lorraine Kelly	Scotland	Good Morning Britain, GMTV with Lorraine, This Morning, Lorraine, Daybreak
Megyn Kelly	United States	The Kelly File, Megyn Kelly Today, Sunday Night with Megyn Kelly
Jason Kennedy	United States	Live from E!
Lisa Kennedy Montgomery	United States	Kennedy on Fox Business, The Independents
Kerri-Anne Kennerley	Australia	Kerri-Anne
Aamir Khan	India	Satyamev Jayate
Alan Khan	South Africa	Nightline with Alan Khan
Kamran Khan	Pakistan	Aaj Shahzeb Khanzada Kay Sath
Johannes B. Kerner	Germany	Kerner, Johannes B. Kerner Show
John Kerwin	United States	The John Kerwin Show
Arabella Kiesbauer	Germany	Arabella (talk show)
Craig Kilborn	United States	The Late Late Show, The Daily Show
Billy Kimball	United States	Afterdrive
Jimmy Kimmel	United States	Jimmy Kimmel Live!
Gayle King	United States	The Gayle King Show
Larry King	United States	Larry King Live, Politicking with Larry King, Larry King Now
Greg Kinnear	United States	Talk Soup, Later with Greg Kinnear
Jordan Klepper	United States	The Opposition with Jordan Klepper, Klepper
Amanda Kloots	United States	The Talk
Heidi Klum	Germany	Project Runway
Adam Kokesh	United States	Adam vs The Man
Lynne Koplitz	United States	Life & Style
Hoda Kotb	United States	Today, Today with Hoda & Jenna
Zaven Kouyoumdjian	Lebanon	Sirée Wenfatahet
Jeremy Kyle	United Kingdom	The Jeremy Kyle Show
Jeremy Kyle	United States	The Jeremy Kyle Show USA

== L ==
Host	Country	Talk show(s) hosted
Nick Lachey	United States	Big Morning Buzz Live
Tomi Lahren	United States	On Point with Tomi Lahren
Lauren Lake	United States	We the People
Ricki Lake	United States	Ricki Lake, The Ricki Lake Show
Larissa Lam	United States	Top 3
Brian Lamb	United States	Q&A, Booknotes
Amanda Lang	Canada	The Exchange with Amanda Lang
Markus Lanz	Germany	Markus Lanz (talk show)
Queen Latifah	United States	The Queen Latifah Show
Denis Latin	Croatia	Latinica
Matt Lauer	United States	Today
Vicki Lawrence	United States	Vicki!
Chris Leary	United States	The Single Life
Jay Leno	United States	The Tonight Show with Jay Leno, The Jay Leno Show
Jerry Lester	United States	Broadway Open House
David Letterman	United States	Late Night with David Letterman, Late Show with David Letterman
Mark Levin	United States	The Mark Levin Show
Ananda Lewis	United States	Teen Summit, The Ananda Lewis Show
Tom Leykis	United States	Tom Leykis Show
Aamir Liaquat	Pakistan	Aisay Nahi Chalay Ga
Rush Limbaugh	United States	The Rush Limbaugh Show
Brian Linehan	Canada	City Lights, Linehan
Lisa Ling	United States	The View
Susan Link	Germany	Kölner Treff
James Lipton	United States	Inside the Actors Studio
Lobão	Brazil	Saca Rolha, Lobotomia
Stacy London	United States	Fashionably Late with Stacy London
Adamari López	Puerto Rico	Un Nuevo Día
Andrés López Forero	Colombia	Andrés López de Noche
George Lopez	United States	Lopez Tonight
Loni Love	United States	The Real
Mother Love	United States	Forgive or Forget
Tim Lovejoy	United Kingdom	Sunday Brunch
Arjen Lubach	Netherlands	Zondag met Lubach
Joan Lunden	United States	Every Day with Joan Lunden, Mother's Day with Joan Lunden
Mubashir Luqman	Pakistan	Khara Sach
Kristian Luuk	Sweden	Sen Kväll Med Luuk

== M ==
Host	Country	Talk show(s) hosted
Norm Macdonald	Canada	Sports Show with Norm Macdonald, Norm Macdonald Live, Norm Macdonald Has a Show
Bill Maher	United States	Politically Incorrect, Real Time with Bill Maher
Rachel Maddow	United States	The Rachel Maddow Show (Air America), The Rachel Maddow Show (MSNBC)
Jeannie Mai	United States	The Real
Sandra Maischberger	Germany	maischberger. die woche
Ermal Mamaqi	Albania	6 Dite pa Ermalin
Howie Mandel	Canada	The Howie Mandel Show
Jason Manford	United Kingdom	The One Show
Adolph Mongo	United States	Detroit in Black & White
Ernie Manouse	United States	InnerVIEWS with Ernie Manouse
Ahmed Mansour	Egypt	Bela Hodod
Diego Maradona	Argentina	La Noche del 10
Hector Marcano	Puerto Rico	Marcano... el show
Cindy Margolis	United States	The Cindy Margolis Show
Debbie Matenopoulos	United States	Home & Family, The View, Good Day Live
Ross Mathews	United States	Hello Ross
Cameron Mathison	Canada	Home & Family
Chris Matthews	United States	Hardball with Chris Matthews, The Chris Matthews Show
Meghan McCain	United States	The View
Davina McCall	United Kingdom	Davina
Jenny McCarthy	United States	The View, The Jenny McCarthy Show
Tim McCarver	United States	The Tim McCarver Show
John McEnroe	United States	McEnroe
Mark McEwen	United States	CBS This Morning
Dr. Phil McGraw	United States	Dr. Phil
Gavin McInnes	United States	The Gavin McInnes Show
Kathaleeya McIntosh	Thailand	Samakhom Chomdao
Willy McIntosh	Thailand	Saranae, Nung Yang Show, Samakhom Chomdao The Willy
Michael McIntyre	United Kingdom	The Michael McIntyre Chat Show
Brian McKnight	United States	The Brian McKnight Show
John McLaughlin	United States	The McLaughlin Group, John McLaughlin's One on One
Vince McMahon	United States	Tuesday Night Titans
Rove McManus	Australia	Rove Live
Michael Medved	United States	The Michael Medved Show
Terry Meeuwsen	United States	Living the Life, The 700 Club
The Kid Mero	Jamaica	Desus vs. Mero, Desus & Mero (2016), Desus & Mero (2019)
Tammy Faye Messner	United States	The PTL Club
Hubertus Meyer-Burckhardt	Germany	NDR Talk Show
Seth Meyers	United States	Late Night with Seth Meyers: The Only Late-Night Authority
Jillian Michaels	United States	The Jillian Michaels Show, The Doctors
Robin Milhausen	Canada	Sex, Toys & Chocolate
Woody Milintachinda	Thailand	The Woody Show
Dennis Miller	United States	Dennis Miller Live, The Dennis Miller Show
Stephanie Miller	United States	The Stephanie Miller Show
Caren Miosga	Germany	Caren Miosga (talk show)
Hamid Mir	Pakistan	Capital Talk
Mehran Modiri	Iran	Dorehami
Jay Mohr	United States	Mo Sports
The Mommies (comedy duo)	United States	Caryl & Marilyn: Real Friends
Mo'Nique	United States	The Mo'Nique Show
Natalie Morales	United States	Today, The Talk
Piers Morgan	United Kingdom	Piers Morgan's Life Stories, Good Morning Britain
Piers Morgan	United States	Piers Morgan Tonight
Pablo Motos	Spain	El Hormiguero
Tamera Mowry	United States	The Real
Megan Mullally	United States	The Megan Mullally Show
Olivia Munn	United States	Attack of the Show!
Al Murray	United Kingdom	Al Murray's Happy Hour
Chris Myers	United States	Up Close

== N ==
Host	Country	Talk show(s) hosted
Yuichi Nakamaru	Japan	Cartoon KAT-TUN
Ana Navarro	United States	The View
Aznil Nawawi	Malaysia	Macam Macam Aznil
Rob Nelson	United States	The Full Nelson, The Rob Nelson Show
Nessa	United States	Talk Stoop, Girl Code Live
Arthel Neville	United States	Talkback Live, The Arthel & Fred Show
Fred Newman	United States	Livewire
Desus Nice	Jamaica	Desus vs. Mero, Desus & Mero (2016), Desus & Mero (2019)
Martin Nievara	Philippines	Martin After Dark, Martin Late at Nite, Martin Late at Night
Trevor Noah	United States	The Daily Show with Trevor Noah
Katie Nolan	United States	Garbage Time with Katie Nolan, No Filter with Katie Nolan, Always Late with Katie Nolan
George Noory	United States	Coast To Coast AM
Graham Norton	United Kingdom	So Graham Norton, V Graham Norton, Graham Norton's Bigger Picture, The Graham Norton Show
Graham Norton	United States	NY Graham Norton, The Graham Norton Effect,
Deborah Norville	United States	Today, Deborah Norville Tonight
Thomas Numme	Norway	Senkveld med Thomas og Harald

== O ==
Host	Country	Talk show(s) hosted
Maureen O'Boyle	United States	In Person with Maureen O'Boyle
Conan O'Brien	United States	Late Night with Conan O'Brien, The Tonight Show with Conan O'Brien, Conan
Soledad O'Brien	United States	Matter of Fact with Soledad O'Brien
Jerry O'Connell	United States	Jerry O', The Talk
Rosie O'Donnell	United States	The Rosie O'Donnell Show, The View, The Rosie Show
Paul O'Grady	United Kingdom	The Paul O'Grady Show; Paul O'Grady Live
Bill O'Reilly	United States	The O'Reilly Factor
Suresh Oberoi	India	Jeena Isi Ka Naam Hai
Luis Francisco Ojeda	(United States) Puerto Rico	Ojeda, Sin Limites
Keith Olbermann	United States	Countdown with Keith Olbermann, Olbermann
John Oliver	United States	Last Week Tonight with John Oliver
Sharon Osbourne	United States/ United Kingdom	The Sharon Osbourne Show, The Talk
Donny Osmond	United States	Donny & Marie (1976), Donny & Marie (1998)
Marie Osmond	United States	The Donny & Marie Show, Donny & Marie, Marie, The Talk -
Dr. Mehmet Oz	United States/ Turkey	The Dr. Oz Show
Beyazıt Öztürk	Turkey	Beyaz Show

== P ==
Host	Country	Talk show(s) hosted
Jack Paar	United States	The Jack Paar Tonight Show
David Pakman	United States	The David Pakman Show
Keke Palmer	United States	Just Keke, GMA3: Strahan, Sara & Keke
Michael Parkinson	United Kingdom	Parkinson
Donovan Patton	United States	Blue's Clues
Jane Pauley	United States	The Jane Pauley Show
Freda Payne	United States	Today's Black Woman
Peter Pek	Malaysia	Brand Malaysia with Peter Pek
Charles Perez	United States	The Charles Perez Show
Rosie Perez	United States	The View
Sue Perkins	United Kingdom	Light Lunch, Mel & Sue, Thronecast
Regis Philbin	United States	That Regis Philbin Show, The Regis Philbin Show, The Morning Show, Regis Phibin's Lifestyles, Live with Regis and Kathie Lee, Live with Regis, Live with Regis and Kelly
Busy Philipps	United States	Busy Tonight
Kellie Pickler	United States	Pickler & Ben
Drew Pinsky	United States	Dr. Drew On Call, Lifechangers
Frank Plasberg	Germany	Hart aber fair
Oliver Pocher	Germany	The Oliver Pocher Show, Schmidt & Pocher
Ana María Polo	United States	Caso Cerrado
Fábio Porchat	Brazil	Programa do Porchat
Maury Povich	United States	Maury
Susan Powter	United States/ Australia	The Susan Powter Show
Dennis Prager	United States	The Dennis Prager Show
Jane Pratt	United States	The Jane Pratt Show
Jeff Probst	United States	The Jeff Probst Show
Laurie Puhn	United States	i on New York
Sarah Purcell	United States	America
Joe Pyne	United States	The Joe Pyne Show

== Q ==
Host	Country	Talk show(s) hosted
Colin Quinn	United States	Tough Crowd with Colin Quinn
Lisa Quinn	United States	The Early Show

== R ==
Host	Country	Talk show(s) hosted
Stefan Raab	Germany	TV total
Jorge Ramos	Mexico	Al Punto
Sally Jessy Raphael	United States	Sally Jessy Raphaël, Sally
Luis Raúl	Puerto Rico	Anda Pa'l Cará
Raven-Symoné	United States	The View
Rachael Ray	United States	The Rachael Ray Show
Ron Reagan	United States	The Ron Reagan Show
Della Reese	United States	The Della Reese Show
Joy Reid	United States	The Reid Report
Leah Remini	United States	The Talk
Whitney Reynolds	United States	The Whitney Reynolds Show
Caroline Rhea	Canada	The Caroline Rhea Show
Simon Rimmer	United Kingdom	Sunday Brunch
Lisa Rinna	United States	Soap Talk
Kelly Ripa	United States	Live with Kelly and Ryan, Live with Kelly and Michael, Live with Kelly, Live with Regis and Kelly
Geraldo Rivera	United States	Geraldo
Joan Rivers	United States	That Show starring Joan Rivers, Joan Rivers: Can We Talk?, The Late Show Starring Joan Rivers, The Joan Rivers Show, Can We Shop?
Mel Robbins	United States	The Mel Robbins Show
JD Roberto	United States	Better
Robin Roberts	United States	Good Morning America
Shaun Robinson	United States	Access Hollywood
Holly Robinson Peete	United States	The Talk
Chris Rock	United States	The Chris Rock Show
Dennis Rodman	United States	The Rodman World Tour
Jim Rome	United States	Talk2
Harald J. Rønneberg	Norway	Senkveld med Thomas og Harald
Johanna Rosaly	Puerto Rico	Cultura Viva (Live Culture), En Vivo a las Cinco
Roseanne	United States	The Roseanne Show
Charlie Rose	United States	CBS News Nightwatch, Charlie Rose
Chris Rose	United States	The Best Damn Sports Show Period
Jonathan Ross	United Kingdom	The Jonathan Ross Show, Friday Night with Jonathan Ross
Dave Rubin	United States	The Rubin Report
Amber Ruffin	United States	The Amber Ruffin Show
RuPaul	United States	The RuPaul Show, RuPaul
Laurent Ruquier	France	On n'est pas couché
Tim Russert	United States	Meet the Press, The Tim Russert Show

== S ==
Host	Country	Talk show(s) hosted
Catt Sadler	United States	Daily Pop, The Daily 10
Pat Sajak	United States	The Pat Sajak Show, Pat Sajak Weekend
Kwaku Sakyi-Addo	Ghana	KWAKU one-on-one
Antonio Sánchez	Puerto Rico	No te Duermas
Summer Sanders	United States	The Sports List
Dr. Kiki Sanford	United States	This Week in Science
Cristina Saralegui	Cuba	El Show de Cristina
Michael Savage	United States	The Savage Nation
Diane Sawyer	United States	Good Morning America
Sara Schaefer	United States	Nikki & Sara Live
Harald Schmidt	Germany	Die Harald Schmidt Show, Harald Schmidt, Schmidt & Pocher
Barbara Schöneberger	Germany	NDR Talk Show
Phillip Schofield	United Kingdom	This Morning
Ed Schultz	United States	The Ed Show
Amanda Seales	United States	The Real
Sam Seder	United States	The Majority Report
Pedro Sevcec	Uruguay	Sevcec
Kapil Sharma	India	Comedy Nights with Kapil
Kapil Sharma	India	The Kapil Sharma Show
Bob Schieffer	United States	Face the Nation
Laura Schlessinger	United States	Dr. Laura
Margarethe Schreinemakers	Germany	Schreinemakers live
Ryan Seacrest	United States	Live with Kelly and Ryan, On Air with Ryan Seacrest
Ross Shafer	United States	The Late Show
Garry Shandling	United States	The Larry Sanders Show
Ben Shephard	United Kingdom	GMTV, Good Morning Britain
Cybill Shepherd	United States	Men Are from Mars, Women Are from Venus
Sherri Shepherd	United States	The View
Rondell Sheridan	United States	Men Are from Mars, Women Are from Venus
Iliza Shlesinger	United States	Truth & Iliza
Dinah Shore	United States	The Dinah Shore Chevy Show, Dinah!
Wil Shriner	United States	The Wil Shriner Show
Sarah Silverman	United States	I Love You, America with Sarah Silverman,
Max Simonet	United States	FishCenter Live
Donnie Simpson	United States	Video Soul, Donnie After Dark
Sinbad	United States	Vibe
Lilly Singh	Canada	A Little Late with Lilly Singh
Fredrik Skavlan	Norway/ Sweden	Skavlan
Frank Skinner	United Kingdom	The Frank Skinner Show, Frank Skinner's Opinionated
Tavis Smiley	United States	Tavis Smiley
Bevy Smith	United States	Fashion Queens, Wendy's Style Squad
Stephen A. Smith	United States	First Take
Tom Snyder	United States	The Tomorrow Show, The Late Late Show
Jô Soares	Brazil	Jô Soares Onze e Meia, Programa do Jô
Tommy Sotomayor	United States	Tommy Sotomayor Live
David Spade	United States	The Showbiz Show with David Spade, Lights Out with David Spade
Hal Sparks	United States	Talk Soup
Chris Spencer	United States	Vibe
Eliot Spitzer	United States	Viewpoint
Jerry Springer	United States	The Jerry Springer Show
George Stephanopoulos	United States	This Week, Good Morning America
Howard Stern	United States	The Howard Stern Show
McLean Stevenson	United States	The McLean Stevenson Show
Alana Stewart	United States	George & Alana
Jon Stewart	United States	The Jon Stewart Show, The Daily Show
Martha Stewart	United States	The Martha Stewart Show
Travis Stork	United States	The Doctors
Michael Strahan	United States	Good Morning America, Live with Kelly and Michael, GMA Day, GMA3: Strahan & Sara, GMA3: Strahan, Sara & Keke
George Stroumboulopoulos	Canada	The Hour
Rachel Stuart	Jamaica	Planet Groove
Shekhar Suman	India	Movers & Shakers
Marc Summers	United States	What Would You Do?, Biggers & Summers
Wanda Sykes	United States	The Wanda Sykes Show

== T ==
Host	Country	Talk show(s) hosted
Junnosuke Taguchi	Japan	Cartoon KAT-TUN
Koki Tanaka	Japan	Cartoon KAT-TUN
Felicia Taylor	United States	Before the Bell
Studs Terkel	United States	Studs Terkel Radio Archive
Robin Thede	United States	The Rundown with Robin Thede
Alan Thicke	Canada	The Alan Thicke Show, Thicke of the Night
Tanisha Thomas	United States	Crazy Talk
Tommy Tiernan	(Republic of Ireland) Ireland	The Tommy Tiernan Show
Bettina Tietjen	Germany	NDR Talk Show, Stargeflüster, Herman und Tietjen, Tietjen und Hirschhausen, Bettina und Bommes
Daniel Tosh	United States	Tosh.0
Ty Treadway	United States	Soap Talk
Slavi Trifonov	Bulgaria	Slavi's Show
Eddie Trunk	United States	That Metal Show
Hal Turner	United States	The Hal Turner Smith
Aisha Tyler	United States	Talk Soup, The Talk, Unapologetic with Aisha Tyler

== U ==
Host	Country	Talk show(s) hosted
Tatsuya Ueda	Japan	Cartoon KAT-TUN
Sheryl Underwood	United States	The Talk
Ivan Urgant	Russia	Evening Urgant

== V ==
Host	Country	Talk show(s) hosted
Iyanla Vanzant	United States	Iyanla
Meredith Vieira	United States	Today, The View, The Meredith Vieira Show
Natalia Villaveces	Colombia	Nitido
Jeremy Vine	United Kingdom	Jeremy Vine

== W ==
Host	Country	Talk show(s) hosted
Daliah Wachs	United States	The Dr. Daliah Show
Chris Wallace	United States	Meet the Press, Fox News Sunday
Nicolle Wallace	United States	The View, Deadline: White House
John Walsh	United States	The John Walsh Show
Barbara Walters	United States	The View
Marsha Warfield	United States	The Marsha Warfield Show
JoAnn Watson	United States	Wake Up Detroit
Rolonda Watts	United States	Attitudes, Rolonda
Keenen Ivory Wayans	United States	The Keenen Ivory Wayans Show
Elaine Welteroth	United States	The Talk
Ali Wentworth	United States	Living It Up! with Ali & Jack
Lisa Whelchel	United States	Collector's Call
Betty White	United States	The Betty White Show (1954)
Paula White	United States	Paula White Today
Jack Whitehall	United Kingdom	Backchat
Michael Whitehall	United Kingdom	Backchat
Timberly Whitfield	United States	New Morning with Timberly Whitfield
Dennis Wholey	United States	Late Night America, This Is America with Dennis Wholey
Steve Wilkos	United States	The Steve Wilkos Show
Anne Will	Germany	Anne Will
Montel Williams	United States	The Montel Williams Show
Wendy Williams	United States	The Wendy Williams Show, Wendy's Style Squad
Holly Willoughby	United Kingdom	This Morning
Larry Wilmore	United States	The Nightly Show with Larry Wilmore
Carnie Wilson	United States	Carnie!
Oprah Winfrey	United States	The Oprah Winfrey Show
Marissa Jaret Winokur	United States	The Talk, All About Sex
Reese Witherspoon	United States	Shine On with Reese
Terry Wogan	United Kingdom	Wogan
Kuba Wojewódzki	Poland	Kuba Wojewódzki Show
Josh Wolf	United States	The Josh Wolf Show
Carmen Rita Wong	United States	On the Money
Chuck Woolery	United States	The Chuck Woolery Show
Matthew Wright	United Kingdom	The Wright Stuff
Nick Wright	United States	First Things First

== Y ==
Host	Country	Talk show(s) hosted
Bård Ylvisåker	Norway	I kveld med YLVIS
Vegard Ylvisåker	Norway	I kveld med YLVIS
Jerome T. Youngman	United States	Bring it to Jerome
Yuri	Mexico	Objetivo Fama

== Z ==
Host	Country	Talk show(s) hosted
Nasim Zehra	Pakistan	Policy Matters
James D. Zirin	United States	Conversations with Jim Zirin
Rachel Zoe	United States	Fashionably Late with Rachel Zoe

== See also ==
- List of game show hosts
