= El amigo de Él y Ella =

"El amigo de Él y Ella" is a 1942 short story written by Miguel Mihura about the first people: Adam and Eve. Providing a new twist to the common creation myth from The Book of Genesis, the author writes a parody incorporating new characters and a new ending. It begins with Adam and Eve angry and upset because they are not alone in the garden, there is another man accompanying them in Paradise, Don Jeronimo. This unexpected guest is described as wearing pajamas and having a thick mustache. Though the title directly translates to The Friend of Him and Her, Don Jeronimo is perceived as being a nuisance to both Adam and Eve until he swoons Eve and later marries her.

== Plot ==
Upset and angry by the fact that they are not alone in Paradise, Adam and Eve are accompanied by another man with a big mustache wearing pajamas. Every day this man, Don Jeronimo, greets the two of them very cordially and attempts to befriend them. Even though Don Jeronimo's intentions are solely to become friends with Adam and Eve, they cannot help but feel angry because the Paradise was only meant for the two of them. Don Jeronimo owns a hotel and has cows which he tends to, all of which irritate Adam and Eve more. One day, Don Jeronimo asks them whether there are others living in Paradise and they respond by saying no and that they are the first people. He congratulates them and invites Adam and Eve to dinner. The reunion between the three of them did not seem right, the picture was not meant to be painted with the three of them but rather only Adam and Eve and the serpent. To Adam and Eve, Paradise was ruined; the gentleman with the mustache had spoiled their plans.

However, as Adam and Eve began to spend more time with Don Jeronimo, little by little they began to like him and become entertained by his jokes. They saw that he was a kind generous man and so the three of them were delighted to be in each other's company. Don Jeronimo asked Adam and Eve if they were married. Not knowing how to answer and unaware of what that meant, they responded by saying no. Don Jeronimo followed up by asking whether they were brother and sister, Adam and Eve answered saying yes, they were brother and sister. A thought then came into Don Jeronimo's mind. He began to tell more jokes to Eve to impress her and even gave her some of his cows. He told her he loved her and the two of them married. They had children whom as they grew created more noise and chaos in Paradise. Even though Adam respected Don Jeronimo, he and the serpent began to feel anger as they realized Paradise would never be what it was. There was nothing more to say or do, change was inevitable.

== History and analysis ==
The author presents the audience with a humorous version of the creation myth from The Book of Genesis, Adam and Eve. Miguel Mihura is a playwright; from a young age he loved theater and could imagine a different life through his pieces. He is considered one of the best comics of Spanish theater from the 20th century because he learned to balance comical and absurd language. He wrote i during the postwar era. Along with this piece, Mihura's other works usually incorporate a strange character that adds a twist to the story.

== Themes ==
- Miguel Mihura's version of Adam and Eve focuses on the theme that sometimes there are certain plans that unexpectedly change and we cannot do anything about it. Though Adam and Eve did not plan to have a guest accompany them in the garden, there was nothing they could do to change it. Don Jeronimo was there to stay and even though he married Eve and their children created more chaos in Paradise, there was nothing more to do. Change was inevitable and the others must adjust accordingly.

== See also ==
- Él y ella, one of Telemundo's most popular talk shows created by Gigi Graciette, who hosted the show with Antonio Farré
- El y Ella, the adaptation in Spain of the Quebec television comedy series Un gars, une fille
