= El beit beitak =

Egyptian television talk show

El Beit Beitak ({Variously spelled El Beet Beetak, El bait baitak, or El bet betak) البيت ييتك, Egyptian Arabic for Feel at home, is a talk show on Egyptian television that features writers, entertainers and politicians.

== History ==
El Beit Beitak (literally "the home is your home") first aired in October 2004 during Ramadan on Channel 1. It moved to Channel 2 and the Egyptian Satellite Channel. It is hosted by Mahmoud Saad, Tamer Amin and Khairy Ramadan. Its popularity influenced Egyptian public opinion. It primarily deals with current affairs, including politics, sports, art, gossip, business, and even fund raising.

Presenter Mahmoud Saad was a journalist on Sabah el Khair. This gave him firsthand knowledge of the Egyptian art and media industry. This knowledge, coupled with his personality and humanitarian sketches are key to the program's success. His limited English language skills were compensated with Amin's fluent English.

The program's diversity was a novelty in Middle East media. For example, a 27 January 2010 episode devoted a section to female sexuality that was followed by the weekly religious section with the liberal, Western-dressed Sheikh Khaled ElGuindy. Saad's talent, basic religiosity, and open mind, enabled him to debate both female orgasm and deep religious matters. This is unique in a country where about 90% of females wear the hijab.

The show changed its name to "Masr el Naharda" in 2010. The events of January 2011 changed things. A few days after 25 January Saad left and joined the revolution. His triumphant return days later anointed him as the voice of the fledgling revolution. Days later he had a live argument, with his former boss, Anas el Fiki, who along with all Mubarak's key advisors, was about to be publicly humiliated. Anas, sensing his imminent and dismal fate revealed live that Saad's salary was around 10 million Egyptian pounds. He resigned shortly afterwards.

== See also ==
Masr El-Nahrda
