= Bettina Tietjen =

German television presenter and talkshow host

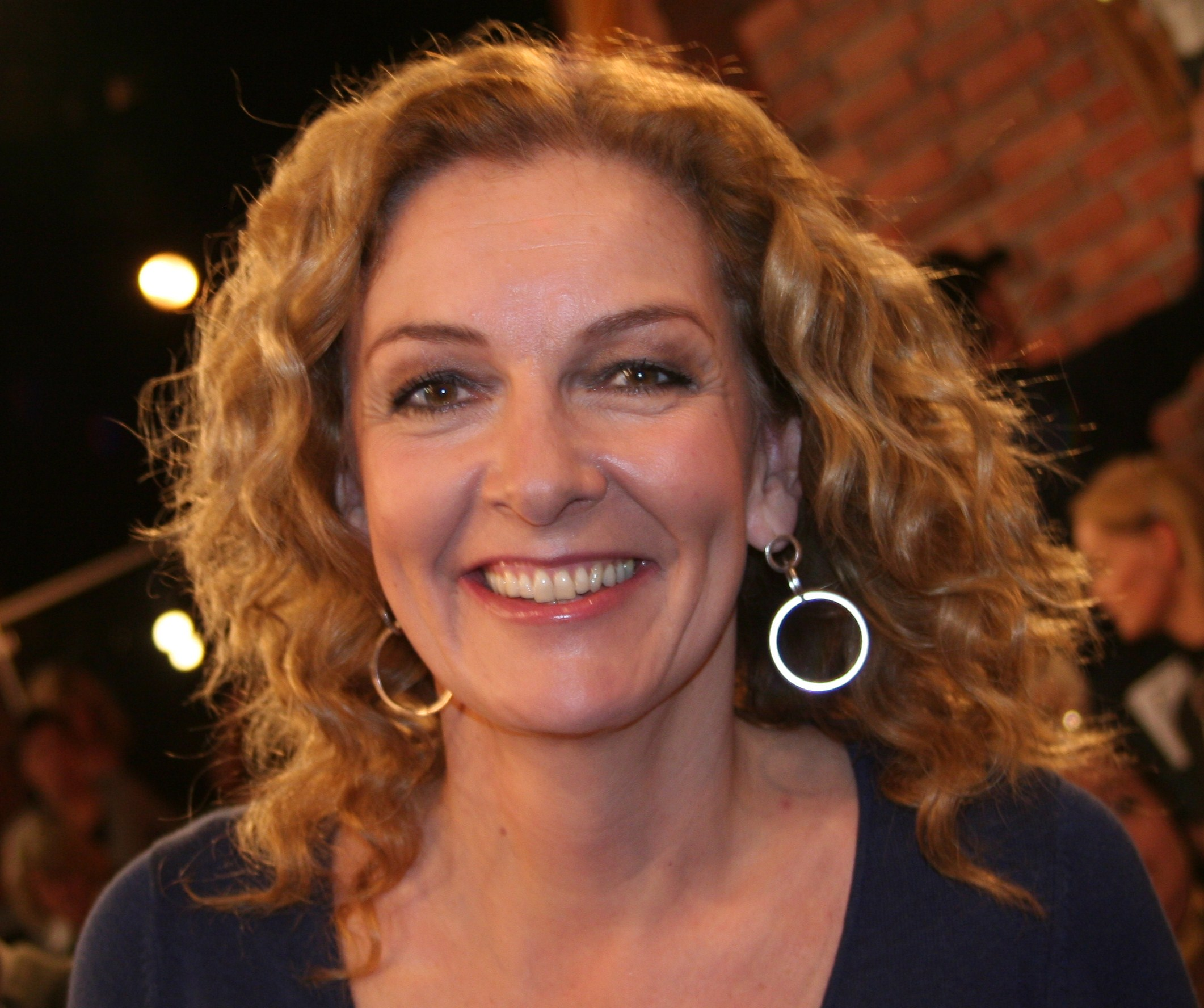
Tietjen, 17 April 2010 at Lafer!Lichter!Lecker!

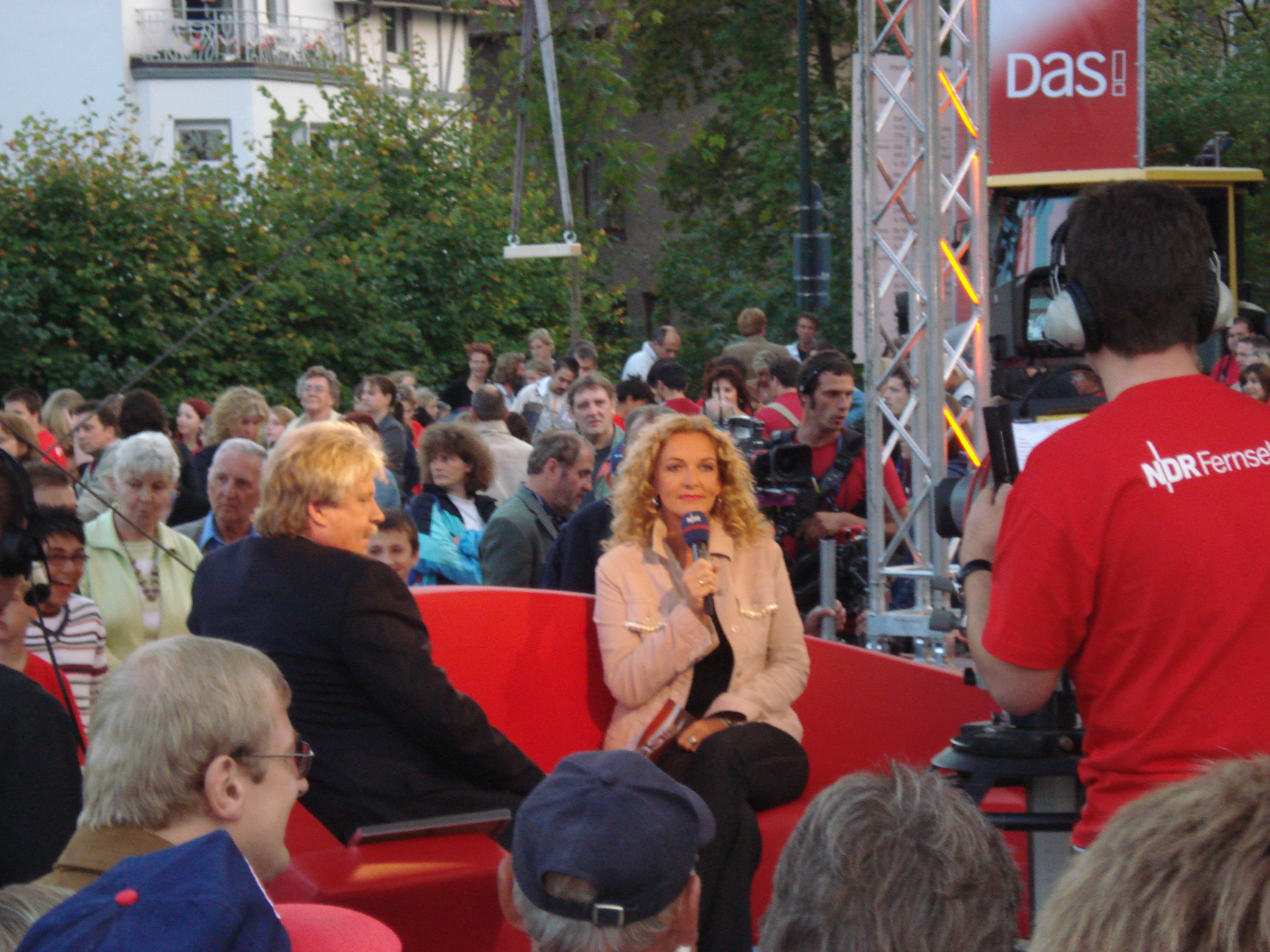
Bettina Tietjen with Klaus Baumgart at Das!, Delmenhorst, 28 September 2006

Bettina Tietjen (* 5 January 1960 in Wuppertal) is a German television presenter and talkshow host.

== Life ==
Tietjen studied German studies, art history and Romance studies at University of Münster and in Paris. After university studies she worked as journalist at RIAS and then at NDR. From January 1997 to September 2007 she was together with Eva Hermann talk show host of Stargeflüster' on NDR: Together with Eckart von Hirschhausen she is since September 2009 talk show host of Tietjen und Hirschhausen on German broadcaster Norddeutscher Rundfunk.
