= Susan Rook =

American journalist (born c. 1961)

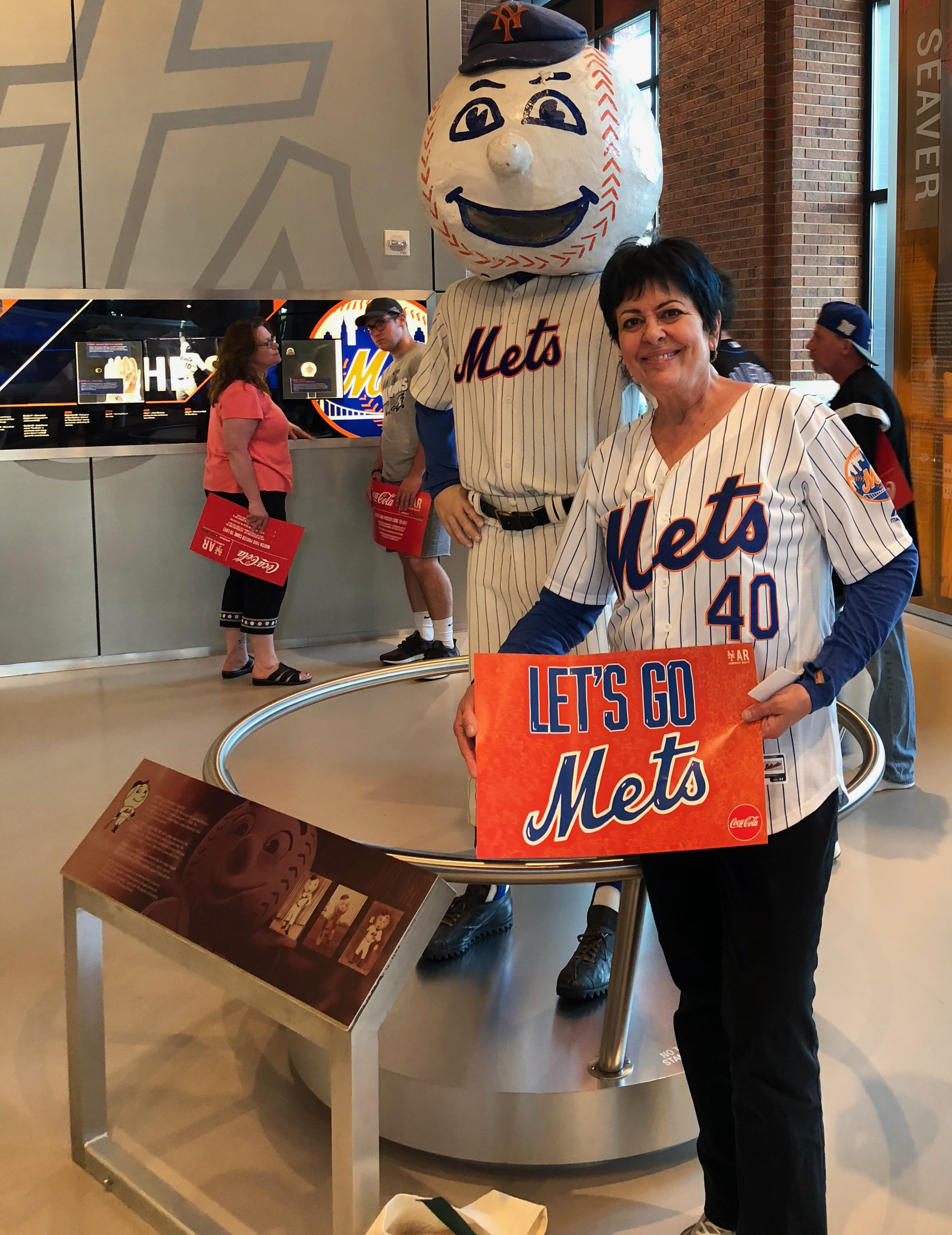
- Born: 1961 (age 64–65)
- Education: George Mason University
- Known for: CNN PrimeNews; Talkback Live (1994–1997, host)
- Spouse: Ed Turner (1993–1994, divorce)

Susan Rook (born c. 1961) is a journalist best known for her years as a CNN anchor and original host of CNN's Talkback Live.

Rook started anchoring overnight news cutins, then moved up to more visible anchor assignments: co-anchoring "Newsnight" with Patrick Emory and later PrimeNews and "Evening News" (later renamed to World News), co-anchoring with Bernard Shaw and later hosting the topical daily talk show TalkBack Live. Rook was one of the three panelists, along with Helen Thomas and Gene Gibbons, in the 3rd 1992 United States presidential election debate with then president George H. W. Bush and future president Bill Clinton. She was also a general assignment reporter in New Orleans and Ft Myers, FL before coming to CNN. She is a graduate of George Mason University

She originally turned down the offer to Anchor on CNN. She took the job after the News Director in New Orleans spiked her investigative story about political corruption. She turned the story over to Ron Ridenhour (an investigative reporter for City Business). Ridenhour was the soldier who sent the letter to Congress that sparked the investigation into the My Lai Massacre.

== Early life ==
Susan Rook was born c. 1961 to Bill, a CIA psychologist, and Edie, a teacher; her brother Bill was born about a year earlier. She was homeschooled for much of her young life and skipped 6th and 12th grades. As a result, she was younger than normal when she began attending George Mason University.

== Career ==
Rook was a reporter for WBBH-TV in Fort Myers, Florida, and WVUE-TV in New Orleans, Louisiana, before she was hired at CNN in 1987.

On October 19, 1992, Rook was a panelist, alongside Gene Gibbons of Reuters and Helen Thomas of UPI, for the third debate of the 1992 presidential election, hosted by Jim Lehrer of The MacNeil/Lehrer NewsHour on PBS.

Rook was inducted into Omicron Delta Kappa, the National Leadership Honor Society at East Tennessee State University in 1994 as an honoris causa initiate.

At CNN, Rook co-hosted CNN PrimeNews with Bernard Shaw and was the host of Talkback Live from its inception in 1994.

Rook left CNN in 1997. She hosted a panel on education for the Republican Governors Association in November 1998.

Rook was a part of the coverage of the millennium celebrations for PBS in 1999–2000.

== Personal life ==
Rook married Ed Turner, former executive vice president of CNN, in 1993. They divorced in 1994. Turner died of cancer in 2002.

Rook is a recovering alcoholic and drug addict.
