= Charles Dera =

American actor, adult entertainer, former exotic dancer and martial artist

- Dera in November 2007
- Born: December 21, 1978 (age 47); Philadelphia, Pennsylvania, U.S.
- Other name: Karl ToughLove
- Occupation: Pornographic film actor
- Years active: 2005–present
- Height: 6 ft 0 in (1.83 m)

Charles Dera (born December 21, 1978) is an American pornographic film actor, mixed martial artist, Marine veteran, and former exotic dancer. Dera has received several adult industry awards, including the NightMoves Award for Male Performer of the Year. In 2022, he was inducted into the AVN Hall of Fame.

== Early life ==
Dera was born in Philadelphia, Pennsylvania on December 21, 1978. He served in the Marines before working as a Chippendales dancer.

== Career ==
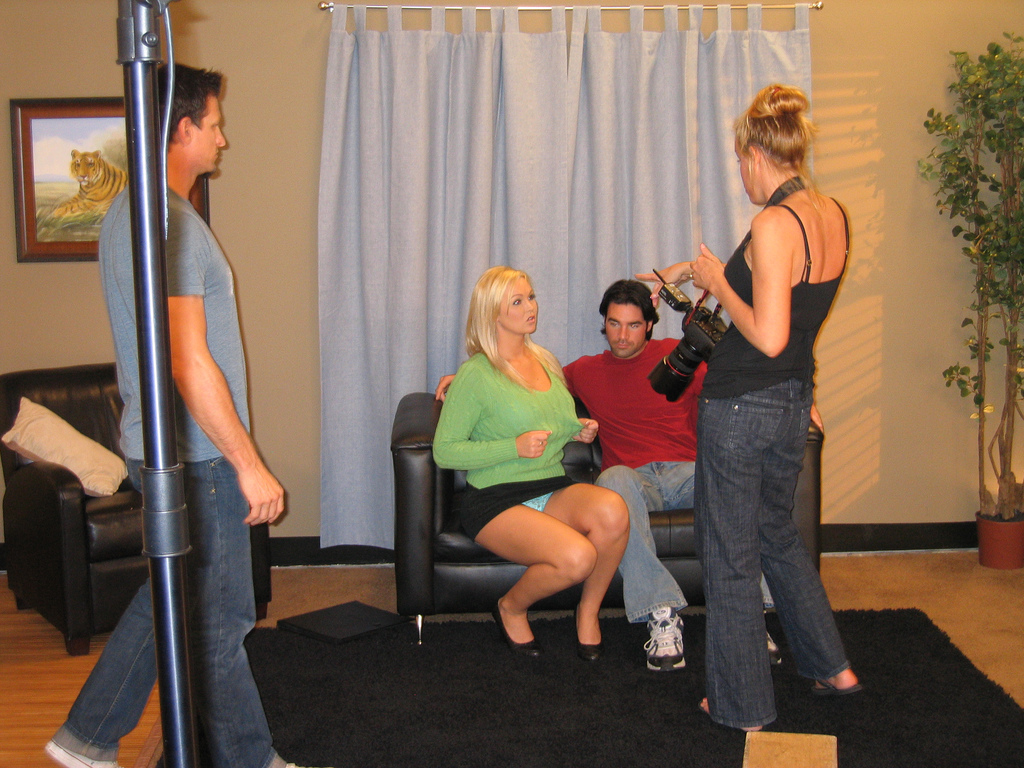
Dera on a porn set in November 2007

In 2005, Dera was named Playgirl magazine's Man of the Year. He has appeared in 313 films for the production company Brazzers, as well as many Reality Kings movies. He has appeared in over 1,100 videos throughout his pornographic career. He also performed as "The Veteran" in the male strip troupe Men of the Strip. In 2016, he played the role of "Donald Drumpf" alongside Cherie DeVille as "Hillary Clayton" in the parody ZZ Erection for Brazzers. Dera received the XBIZ Award for Best Actor in 2018.

== Personal life ==
Dera resides in Orange County, California. He enjoys riding motorcycles.

Dera practices jiu-jitsu, training on and off since the early 2000s. He trained under fellow Chippendales dancer and professional middleweight Mike Foland.

== Selected filmography ==
Year	Title	Role	Notes	Ref.
2005	Underwear Uncovered	Himself	First credited pornographic appearance	
2008	The Four	King Leonidas		
2008	Pirates II: Stagnetti's Revenge	Takvor's Man		
2016	ZZ Erection	Donald Drumpf		
2019	Dinner with Dani	Himself	Episode: "Sausage Fest"	

== Mixed martial arts record ==
Professional record breakdown
6 matches	3 wins	2 losses
By submission	1	1
By decision	2	1
Draws	1	

Res.	Record	Opponent	Method	Event	Date	Round	Time	Location	Notes
Loss	2-2-1	Alan Shook	Decision (unanimous)	NFAMMA - MMA at the Hyatt 3: Redemption	October 16, 2009	3	3:00	Westlake Village, California	
Win	2-1-1	Shaun Gutridge	Decision (unanimous)	TFA 16 - Battle in the Bullring	September 12, 2009	3	3:00	Artesia, California	
Win	1-1-1	Yusef Lewis	Decision (unanimous)	NFAMMA - MMA at the Hyatt 2	May 28, 2009	3	3:00	Westlake Village, California	
Loss	0-1-1	Nate Moore	Submission (armbar)	NFAMMA - MMA at the Hyatt	March 5, 2009	1	2:48	Westlake Village, California	
Draw	0-0-1	Amos Sotelo	Draw	DH 4 - Desert Heat 4	March 12, 2005	3	5:00	Phoenix, Arizona	

== Awards and nominations ==
List of accolades received by Charles Dera
Awards and nominations
Award	Won	Nominated
AVN Awards	5	9
Inked Awards	0	2
NightMoves Awards	1	4
XBIZ Awards	2	20
XRCO Awards	5	2
- Total number of wins and nominations
Totals	13	37

AVN Awards
Year	Nominated work and artist	Category	Result	Ref.
2009	Charles Dera	Unsung Male Performer Of The Year	Won	
2017	Suicide Squad XXX: An Axel Braun Parody	Best Three-Way Sex Scene - Boy/Boy/Girl	Won	
2017	Supergirl XXX: An Axel Braun Parody	Best Boy/Girl Sex Scene	Nominated	
2018	Charles Dera	Male Performer of the Year	Nominated	
2018	Half His Age: A Teenage Tragedy	Best Actor	Nominated	
2018	Sacrosanct	Best Three-Way Sex Scene - Boy/Boy/Girl	Nominated	
2019	Cartel Sex	Best Supporting Actor	Won	
2021	Charles Dera	Best Directing – Site/Network Content	Nominated	
2021	Charles Dera	Male Performer of the Year	Nominated	
2021	Evil Girls With Mormon Boys	Best Three-Way Sex Scene – B/B/G	Nominated	
2021	Nice Girls Finish Last	Best Actor – Featurette	Nominated	
2021	Nice Girls Finish Last	Best Boy/Girl Sex Scene	Nominated	
2022	Charles Dera	AVN Hall of Fame - Class of 2022	Won	
2024	Machine Gunner	Best Tag-Team Sex Scene	Won	

Inked Awards
Year	Nominated work	Category	Result	Ref.
2017	Suicide Squad XXX	Group Scene of the Year	Nominated	
2018	Bloodthirsty Biker Babes	Best Group Scene	Nominated	

NightMoves Awards
Year	Nominated work and artist	Category	Result	Ref.
2018	Charles Dera	Best Male Performer	Nominated	
2019	Charles Dera	Best Male Performer	Won	
2020	Charles Dera	Best Male Performer	Nominated	
2021	Charles Dera	Best Male Performer	Nominated	
2022	Charles Dera	Best Male Actor	Nominated	

XBIZ Awards
Year	Nominated work	Category	Result	Ref.
2017	Supergirl XXX: An Axel Braun Parody	Parody Release of the Year	Nominated	
2018	Charles Dera	Male Performer of the Year	Nominated	
2018	Half His Age: A Teenage Tragedy	Best Actor — Feature Release	Won	
2018	Half His Age: A Teenage Tragedy	Best Scene — Feature Release	Nominated	
2018	Sacrosanct	Best Sex Scene — Vignette Release	Won	
2018	Stepmother 15	Best Sex Scene — Taboo Release	Nominated	
2018	Teen Yoga	Best Sex Scene — All-Sex Release	Nominated	
2019	Charles Dera	Male Performer of the Year	Nominated	
2019	The Bad Uncle	Best Sex Scene — Taboo Release	Nominated	
2019	Dark Obsession	Best Sex Scene — Couples-Themed Release	Nominated	
2019	The Electra Complex	Best Actor — Taboo Release	Nominated	
2020	Charles Dera	Male Performer of the Year	Nominated	
2020	Bad Samaritans	Best Sex Scene — Vignette	Nominated	
2020	Blow: A DP XXX Parody	Best Supporting Actor	Nominated	
2020	Female Submission	Best Sex Scene — All-Sex	Nominated	
2021	Charles Dera	Male Performer of the Year	Nominated	
2022	Casey: A True Story	Best Sex Scene — Feature Movie	Nominated	
2022	Charles Dera	Male Performer of the Year	Nominated	
2023	The Bad Neighbors	Best Sex Scene — Featurette	Nominated	
2023	Charles Dera	Male Performer of the Year	Nominated	
2024	Charles Dera	Male Performer of the Year	Nominated	
2024	Love, Sex, & Throuple Trouble	Best Sex Scene – Feature Movie	Nominated	

XRCO Awards
Year	Nominated work	Category	Result	Ref.
2008	Charles Dera	New Stud	Won	
2009	Charles Dera	Unsung Swordsman	Won	
2018	Charles Dera	Unsung Swordsman	Won	
2019	Charles Dera	Unsung Swordsman	Won	
2021	Charles Dera	Unsung Swordsman	Won	
2022	Charles Dera	Best Male Actor	Nominated	
2023	Duplicity	Best Actor	Nominated	
