= Laura Bozzo =

Peruvian talk show hostess

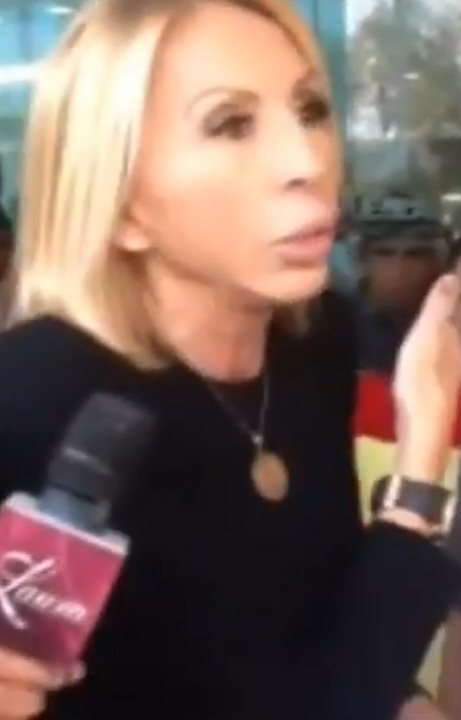
- Born: Laura Cecilia Bozzo Rotondo; August 19, 1951 (age 75); Callao, Peru
- Education: Federico Villarreal National University (LLB); Central University of Venezuela
- Occupations: Talk show host, lawyer
- Years active: 1990–present
- Spouse: Mario de la Fuente (m. 1980; div. 2000)
- Children: 2

Laura Cecilia Bozzo Rotondo (born August 19, 1951) is a Peruvian talk show hostess, best known for her Spanish-language talk show Laura that was broadcast in the United States on the Univision television network.

Bozzo has hosted other talk shows under her name, including Laura en América, back in the 1990s to early 2000s. Her talk shows have been compared to the Jerry Springer Show and The Steve Wilkos Show due to the fights that regularly occur as well as the sensitive subject matter routinely discussed. In 2008, a scandal erupted when it was discovered by the Peruvian press, led by important figures such as Jaime Bayly, that some of the shows provided by Bozzo were staged.

== Biography ==
=== Early life ===
Bozzo was born in Callao, Peru to engineer Miguel Bozzo Chirichignio and Victoria Luisa Rotondo Mendoza, both of Italian, Spanish, and Quechua descent; She has triple citizenship between Peru, Italy and Mexico. She studied law at Female University of the Sacred Heart and Federico Villarreal National University in Lima, Peru and at Central University of Venezuela in Caracas, Venezuela receiving degrees in law and political science there and teaching classes within such fields in various universities. In 1987, she became the appointed officer of the Instituto Nacional de Cultura and organized competitions to promote the conservation of the cultural heritage of Peru. In 1992, she became the regidora (alderman) of metropolitan Lima.

=== Career ===
She began in television in 1994 with Las mujeres tienen la palabra, a feminist show, on RBC Televisión. In 1997, Laura Bozzo went to Panamericana Televisión and assumed the conductor role of the reality show Intimidades. A year later, Bozzo was hired by América Televisión and launched Laura en América, this program was very popular in Peru and other countries in the Americas, such as the United States.

In 1998, she organized the organization Solidaridad de Familia (Family Solidarity) as a charitable foundation to assist people from Peru and other Latin American nations with legal, medical, and psychological problems; which has been under much criticism for increasing suspicion of being funded by former president Alberto Fujimori.

In February 1998, the American Spanish-language broadcast network Telemundo began broadcasting her show Laura en América on its affiliates. The show soon began to be shown all over Latin America. Similar in nature to the American Jerry Springer Show, it routinely featured guests usually having troubles within their lives, including infidelity. Usually, the show would expose evidence of wrongdoing by the suspect that the guest presents, leading to fighting between guests. The authenticity of the show has been questioned, given the unusually sensational subjects explored. By the end of the year, Bozzo moved to Miami, Florida.

2006, Bozzo's RAT contract with Telemundo expired after five years, so she moved her production to Televisa; production of Laura en America ended in July 2006. In October 2006, Bozzo appeared on the program ¿Dónde estás corazón? on the network Antena 3 from Spain, criticizing Alejandro Toledo for causing her arrest.

Just a few days before the one-year anniversary of her release from house arrest, Laura Bozzo was convicted of all the charges against her and was sentenced to four consecutive years in prison. Laura later informed a local television station, Canal 9, that she planned to use a newly enacted law in her favor and sue the Peruvian government.

In January 2007, Bozzo attempted to enter the Spanish TV market through Spain's Telecinco, but once some executives saw pilots of the program, a proposal for a new Bozzo show was canceled. On November 6, 2007, her new show Laura en acción debuted on Telemundo in the United States. However, in March 2008, lawyer Freddy Escobar started an investigation about the possible illegal use of minors in her program, being exposed on TV to present fake cases of family sex violence. A scandal involving an underage girl who appeared on Laura en acción caused the show to be canceled by Peruvian network América Televisión, in which the show originally aired. Telemundo stopped airing the series by the beginning of May 2008.

In June 2009, Laura Bozzo made her television reappearance after her last talk show, Laura en Acción was cancelled in April 2008. Bozzo relocated herself in Mexico and started working on many shows on Televisa, the largest Spanish-speaking television network in all the World, but then she went to TV Azteca and hosted the talkshow Laura de todos (shortened from Laura de todos: sin miedo a la verdad), for two years and a half. Laura Bozzo's show aired on Azteca 13 at 17:00 hrs. CT in the country. The show was also televised in the United States, through Azteca America at 20:00 hrs. Laura left the show after having differences with the executives of TV Azteca. Bozzo was replaced by the Mexican television host Rocío Sánchez Azuara with the return of the talk show Cosas de la vida. Laura Bozzo returned to Televisa.

She signed a contract for five years with Televisa to make a new show called Laura herself and Federico Wilkins were the producers of Laura. Wilkins was fired after making up that Laura's boyfriend, Argentinian singer Christian Suárez who is 24 years her junior, was cheating on her with Karina Alvarez; Gabriel Vasquez Woodman took over the production. The talk show airs on Canal de las Estrellas network in Mexico. The show premiered on January 24, 2011, at 16:00 hrs the show airs for 1 hour and 30 minutes. (CT), the show also airs on Saturdays at 17 hrs. The show's premiere live in Mexico was very successful with 18.9 points in rating and 40.5 in share and on its second day the show reached 19.4 in rating beating its competition. Laura started airing in the United States through Telefutura (now UniMás) at 7/6c pm competing with Telemundo's Caso cerrado. Although the show was cancelled due to low ratings and other factors in April 2011, Telefutura aired Laura again at 2pm/1pm central on October 10, 2011, and since has become such a hit that it airs two hours a day starting at 11pm/10pm pacific.

Reality shows
Year	Title	Role	Notes
2021	Las Estrellas Bailan en Hoy	Contestant with Carlos Bonavides	4th eliminated
2021	Las Estrellas Bailan en Hoy	Contestant with Raúl Sandoval	5th eliminated
2022–present	La casa de los famosos	Housemate Panelist Guest panelist Housemate	6th place (season 2) Season 3 Season 4 16th place (season 5)
2023	Gran Hermano VIP	Housemate	4th finalist (season 8)
2024	MasterChef Celebrity México	Herself	8th place
2024	Gran Hermano Dúo 2	Panelist	
2025-26	El internado	Herself	Abandoned

== Criticism ==
In September, 2013, Mexican social media ramped up criticisms against Laura Bozzo through Twitter and Facebook with the hashtags #LauraBozzoFueraDeMexico and #LauraBozzoMexicoNoTeQuiere, for using official State of Mexico government helicopters during a telecast allegedly used for the benefit of her show in order to set dramatic staging for the TV audience, while deferring rescue labors during the relief efforts for Hurricane Manuel. Criticism was sparked on Televisa's competitor, MVS networks, by Mexican journalist and noted Televisa detractor Carmen Aristegui's recount on the story, first published in the political journal Proceso. This was followed by Bozzo's public contest of the allegations. A petition on Change.org has been made by civil group "CREAMOS México A.C." to elicit her dismissal from Mexican TV.

== Personal life ==
Bozzo married lawyer Mario de la Fuente in 1980. The couple had two daughters, Alejandra and Victoria. After 20 years of marriage, they divorced in August 2000. In 2000, Laura Bozzo stirred controversy by starting a relationship with Cristian Suárez; 24 years her junior and former member of the Argentine musical group Ráfaga ending the relationship in July 2017.

== Legal issues ==
It was reported, in August 2021, that a judge in Mexico ordered Bozzo to be detained after she did not voluntarily appear at court to face charges of tax evasion. It is believed that she left Mexico and the Interpol has been asked to help find her.
