= Miss Lawrence =

American actor

- Born: Lawrence Washington; October 13, 1982 (age 44); Atlanta, Georgia, U.S.
- Occupation: Actor
- Years active: 2008–present

Lawrence Washington, known professionally as Miss Lawrence, is an American actor, singer and hair salon owner. Lawrence began his television career by appearing on The Real Housewives of Atlanta from 2008 to 2017.

Lawrence was born and raised in Atlanta, Georgia. Before television, he graduated from Tri-Cities High School in East Point, Georgia. He worked as a hairstylist in Atlanta, where he met Sheree Whitfield. When Whitfield was cast on The Real Housewives of Atlanta in 2008, he was initially hired as a makeup artist for the program, but eventually became a recurring presence on the show as well. From 2013 to 2015, he hosted the Bravo series Fashion Queens.

In 2015, Lawrence appeared in the Fox prime time soap opera Empire, produced by Lee Daniels. In 2016, Daniels cast Lawrence in the regular role of Miss Bruce in his other soap, Star. Lawrence later made his big screen debut in Lee Daniels' The United States vs. Billie Holiday, and later was cast in The Deliverance. He also appeared in the 2022 romantic comedy film Bros.

== Filmography ==
Year	Title	Role	Notes
2013-2015	Fashion Queens	Himself	Co-host
2015	Empire	Miss Lawrence	Episode: "The Devils Are Here"
2016-2019	Star	Miss Bruce	Series regular, 48 episodes
2021	The United States vs. Billie Holiday	Miss Freddy	
2022	Bros	Wanda	
2024	The Deliverance	Asia	
