= Barry J. Farber =

- Occupations: Entrepreneur, sales consultant, author, talk show host

Barry J. Farber is an American entrepreneur, sales consultant, author, and talk show host.

== Career ==
Farber has written eleven books, which have been translated into more than 25 languages with over one million copies sold. He is a monthly columnist for a while Entrepreneur magazine, and formerly hosted a television show called Diamonds in the Rough, and was executive producer for the Jackie Mason Show, for which work he won 3 Telly Awards.

He was the broker and agent for the $7 million Evel Knievel roller coaster that Six Flags Theme Parks launched the summer of 2008, and is literary agent for the autobiography of world champion skateboarder Andy Macdonald.

He holds a black belt in Tae Kwon Do, Black Belt Weapons Regional and National Tournament Champion and studies several other martial arts. Farber often incorporates his martial arts experience into his presentations.

Farber is Co-Inventor and Marketer of the FoldzFlat Pen.

== Influence ==
Farber's perspectives have been quoted in other publications, such as If it wasn't for the people—this job would be fun! by Charles Bourke Motsett, Secrets of Successful Telephone Selling, by Robert W. Bly, The Aladdin factor by Jack Canfield, Mark Victor Hansen, and How You Can Start and Manage Your Own Business by Nathaniel Ejiga.

== Partial bibliography ==
- Barry Farber's Guide to Handling Sales Objections ISBN 1-56414-773-8
- Superstar Sales Manager's Secrets ISBN 1-56414-659-6
- Superstar Sales Secrets: State of the Art Selling ISBN 0-7567-8475-1
- Diamond Power: Gems of Wisdom from America's Greatest Marketer ISBN 1-56414-698-7
- Superstar Sales Secrets ISBN 1-56414-658-8
- State of the Art Selling ISBN 0-585-27729-X
- Breakthrough Selling: Customer-building Strategies from the Best in the Business (with Joyce Wycoff) ISBN 0-13-095613-9
- Diamond in the Rough ISBN 0-425-14733-9
- Dive Right in: 101 Powerful Action Steps for Personal Achievement ISBN 0-425-17042-X
- Sales Secrets from Your Customers ISBN 1-56414-169-1
- Diamonds Under Pressure: Five Steps to Turning Adversity Into Success ISBN 0-425-16317-2
