= Bob Berkowitz =

American journalist, talk show host, and writer

- Born: United States
- Occupations: Journalist, talk show host, author, business and political communications consultant
- Spouse: Susan Yager

Bob Berkowitz is an American journalist, talk show host, and author.

== Education ==
He holds a degree in business from the State University of New York at Delhi and a B.A. in communications from the University of Denver.

== Professional life ==
Berkowitz began his career at Associated Press, and is best known as former Senate and White House correspondent for CNN where he was a founding correspondent covering the 1980 presidential campaign. He was general news correspondent for ABC News, and men's correspondent for the Today Show on NBC. He was host of a talk show on the Financial News Network, and also host of Real Personal, a ground-breaking show on CNBC from 1991 to 1994 that dealt with human sexuality.

Berkowitz is a Principal at The Dilenschneider Group, a New York-based strategic communications firm, where he specializes in media, speech, and personal communications training.

He is the co-founder of the Big6 strategy.

== Publications ==
He co-authored Why Men Stop Having Sex. And What You Can Do Without It with his wife, author Susan Yager, as well as the best-selling What Men Won't Tell You. But Women Need to Know.
