= J. J. Bittenbinder =

Police detective and journalist (1942–2023)

John Joseph Bittenbinder (September 1, 1942 – May 26, 2023), known as J. J. Bittenbinder, was an American police officer, television host, and author. A member of the Chicago Police Department, he hosted the 1990s crime series Tough Target, and was a public speaker on the subject of safety.

== Biography ==
Bittenbinder was born on September 1, 1942, in Buffalo, New York, and raised in the Chicago neighborhood of Lincoln Park. He graduated from DePaul Academy in Lincoln Park and subsequently attended DePaul University. He joined the Chicago Police Department in 1971 and remained with the force for 23 years; the last 17 were spent assigned to homicide and violent crimes. He was considered to be an expert on violent crimes and toured the country, speaking to audiences about the topic. His 1997 book Tough Target: A Street-Smart Guide to Staying Safe was critically and financially successful.

== In popular culture ==
In 1995, Bittenbinder became the host of the television program Tough Target, which focused on crimes and their prevention. He also wrote for the show. It was cancelled in 1996. He also had two of his own television specials on PBS, Street Smarts: How to Avoid Being a Victim and Street Smarts: Straight Talk for Kids, Teens & Parents. He made guest appearances on many television shows, including The Oprah Winfrey Show and Primetime Live. He also appeared on CNN and was the subject of national PBS television specials.

Bittenbinder was parodied in the cult favorite sketch comedy program Mr. Show. In the episode "Now Who Wants Ice Cream?", the comedian Bob Odenkirk portrayed F. F. Woodycooks, a bizarre, nasal-voiced host of a television show about crime, who was a parody of Bittenbinder. Woodycooks even has a strange mustache like Bittenbinder's and uses unusual and funny-sounding phrases to refer to criminals. Woodycooks hosts a show called Take Back the Streets in which he shows dramatizations of crimes. The sketch ends with Woodycooks promoting his "F. F. Woodycooks Ice Cream Parlour Precincts". Mr. Show writer Paul F. Tompkins states that he came up with the idea for the sketch after he heard Bittenbinder refer to a couple of rapists as "goofs".

Stand-up comedian John Mulaney references Bittenbinder's presentations to Mulaney's class at Saint Clement Catholic Elementary School in his Netflix comedy special John Mulaney: Kid Gorgeous at Radio City.

== Later work ==
Bittenbinder served as Good Morning America's Safety Specialist. He stated that he never wore a cowboy hat to school visits, contrary to what comedian John Mulaney said in his stand-up routine.

== Death ==
Bittenbinder died on May 26, 2023, at the age of 80.
