= Tough Target =

Tough Target is an American television talk show that aired from 1995 to 1996. The show focused on issues of crime and how to prevent oneself from being a victim. It was hosted by safety specialist J. J. Bittenbinder.
