= Wendy's Style Squad =

- Genre: Talk show
- Presented by: Wendy Williams; Bevy Smith; Lloyd Boston; Robert Verdi
- Country of origin: United States
- Original language: English
- No. of seasons: 1
- No. of episodes: 4

Production
- Running time: 42 minutes

Original release
- Network: BET
- Release: February 16 – September 19, 2016

Wendy's Style Squad is an American fashion-themed television talk show that premiered on February 16, 2016 on BET. Hosted by Wendy Williams, Bevy Smith, Lloyd Boston, and Robert Verdi, the one-hour long red carpet fashion special series features the panel discussing the best and the worst fashion choices of the award season.

The first episode of the show aired on February 16, 2016, the panel were weighing on fashion looks of the 58th Annual Grammy Awards.

== Episodes ==
No.	Title	Original release date	Viewers
1	Grammy Awards	February 16, 2016	N/A
2	BET Awards	June 27, 2016	N/A
3	VMA Awards	August 29, 2016	N/A
4	Emmy Awards	September 19, 2016	N/A
