= Vibe (talk show) =

- Created by: Quincy Jones
- Written by: Geoff Brown; Steve Billnitzer; Steve Melcher; Hugh Moore; T. Sean Shannon; Charles Shannon II; James Shannon
- Directed by: Sandra Fullerton
- Presented by: Chris Spencer (1997); Sinbad (1997–1998)
- Composers: Greg Phillinganes; David Sibley
- Country of origin: United States
- Original language: English
- No. of seasons: 2
- No. of episodes: 28

Production
- Executive producers: David Salzman; Daniel Salzman; Quincy Jones; Daniel Kellison
- Producers: Annette Grundy; Daniel Salzman; Belma Johnson; Cali Alpert; Monique Chenault
- Production location: Los Angeles
- Camera setup: Matt Sohn
- Production companies: Vibe TV, LLC. Columbia TriStar Television Distribution

Original release
- Network: Syndication
- Release: August 4, 1997 – April 17, 1998

Vibe was a syndicated American late-night talk show that was spun off from the magazine of the same name. Premiering in August 1997, it was produced by Quincy Jones and hosted by Chris Spencer. It featured a brief appearance by President Bill Clinton on its first episode. Like The Arsenio Hall Show of the early 1990s, it attracted young, urban audiences. Spencer was fired in October 1997 and replaced by comedian Sinbad, along with Big Boy as the in-house announcer. The show lasted only until the summer of 1998 when it was canceled. The show was taped from CBS Television City in Los Angeles.

== See also ==
- List of late night network TV programs
