= Dinner with Dani =

American television talk-show (2018–present)

- Genre: Talk-show
- Directed by: Devon Johnson; Daniel Marques
- Presented by: Dani Daniels
- No. of seasons: 1
- No. of episodes: 10

Production
- Producers: Dani Daniels; Victor Cipolla; Edward Garcia; Jim Mendrinos
- Cinematography: Chris Famelette

Original release
- Network: Amazon Prime
- Release: September 23, 2018 – present

Dinner with Dani is an American talk show hosted by pornographic actress Dani Daniels on Amazon Prime Video. The show premiered on September 23, 2018, and is distributed and produced by New Media Productions. The show records in New York City at Giulietta's Cantina Club in West Village.

== Background ==
The show first aired September 23, 2018. The show is hosted by award-winning pornographic actress Dani Daniels. Many of the guests are fellow pornographic actors and actress as well as other influential people; in the season one finale actor and comedian Gilbert Gottfried was one of the guests.

The show is filmed in New York City more specifically at Giulietta's Cantina Club in West Village.

== Production ==
The show is co-produced by New Media Productions and D. Daniel Enterprises. In 2018 and 2019, show producers have included Dani Daniels, Victor Cipolla, Edward Garcia and Jim Mendrinos.

The show is shot with a multicamera setup and is in the 1080i high-definition television full color picture format.

== Episodes ==
=== Season 1 ===
No.	Original release date	Guest(s)	Viewers (thousands)
1	September 23, 2018	Asa Akira, Alexis Texas, Phoenix Marie and Jim Norton	75
2	September 23, 2018	Sophie Dee, Tanya Tate, Jeff Leach and Raylin Christensen	88
3	September 30, 2018	Romi Rain, Jon Laster, Katt Leya and Vanessa Veracruz	52.5
4	November 4, 2018	Christy Mack, Katrina Jade, Joanne Angel and Stenfano Alcantara	66
5	November 25, 2018	Julia Ann, Kendra Lust, Cherie DeVille and Jess O'Reilly	89.6
6	February 28, 2019	Lauren Phillips, Penny Pax, Carole Montgomery and John Paul Pike	49.3
7	March 3, 2019	Dana DeArmond, Maddy O'Reilly, Rich Vos and Trinity St. Clair	57.55
8	March 9, 2019	Johnny Sins, Walker Hays, Charles Dera and Small Hands	61
9	March 17, 2019	Sarah Love, Nikki Delano, Eva Lovia and Sherwood Small	27.5
10	March 23, 2019	Mia Malkova, A.J. Applegate, Jada Stevens and Gilbert Gottfried	63

== International broadcast ==
The show is available through Amazon Prime Video worldwide and through Just Watch in the following countries: United Kingdom, France, Spain, Australia, New Zealand, Brazil, Japan, Germany and the Netherlands.
