= Jeff Hullinger =

American sports anchor

Jeff Hullinger is a news and sports anchor from Atlanta. He has also been inducted into the Southeast Chapter of the National Academy of Television Arts & Sciences Silver Circle.

Now at Georgia Public Broadcasting as an Executive Producer of Local Content, Jeff was most recently with WXIA-TV, the NBC affiliate in Atlanta. He has worked as the morning drive news anchor on B98.5 WSB-FM, and the afternoon drive news anchor on News/Talk 750 WSB Radio. His career includes anchoring WAGA-TV, being a host for CNN’s TalkBack Live, calling games for ESPN and doing play-by-play for the Atlanta Falcons.

== Early life ==
Hullinger has received a Bachelor of Science degree in Mass Communications from Colorado State University Pueblo.

== Career ==
Hullinger began his broadcast career in Denver, leaving it in 1981 to join KSL-TV in Salt Lake City as weekend sports anchor before returning in 1982 to join KOA-TV / KCNC-TV (KOA became KCNC in 1983) to host Denver Broncos pre-game shows and weekend sports.

He spent two years as ESPN TV's frontline College Football announcer including bowl games, and also called Men and Woman's NCAA College Basketball and the Arena Football League post-season.

He worked 18 years from 1984 to 2002 on Fox's Atlanta affiliate WAGA-TV, his services including being WAGA's weeknight sports anchor. "In 1996, Hullinger anchored 8 hours of FOX 5's coverage of the Centennial Olympic Park bombing coverage" He was also "Voice of the Falcons": radio voice of the Atlanta Falcons.

Jeff Hullinger was at WXIA for 13 years, from 2010 to 2023.

== Awards and recognition ==
Hullinger is the recipient of multiple awards and honors. Jeff has been inducted into the Southeast Chapter of the National Academy of Television Arts & Sciences Silver Circle. He is a 22 time Emmy Award winner; the most ever of any Atlanta Sports anchor, has been recognized multiple times at "Best of Atlanta", has been 3 times awarded "Best Play by Play" in the State of Georgia by the Associated Press as the voice of the Atlanta Falcons, and is Georgia "Sportscaster of the Year" by the National Sportscasters and Sportswriters Association.

In both 2007 and 2008 he was a finalist at the Society of Professional Journalists annual "Green Eyeshade" Awards: In 2007 for Radio - "Best Newscast" and Radio - "Breaking News", and 2008 for Radio - "Best Newscast" and Radio - "Breaking News". In 2008, he won two regional RTNDA Edward R. Murrow Awards for news and reporting.
