= Tommy Sotomayor =

American film producer

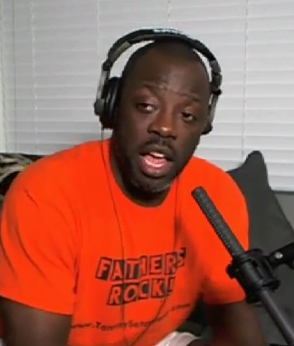
- Sotomayor in 2015
- Born: Thomas Jerome Harris; 1975 (age 50–51); United States
- Occupations: Radio show host, YouTube personality, commentator
- Website: sotomayortv.com

Thomas Jerome Harris (born 1975) is an American radio and internet talk show host, YouTube personality, conservative political commentator, men's rights activist, and film producer.

== Podcast controversy ==
In July 2016, a video from the night of the 2016 shooting of Dallas police officers showed two on-duty Dallas Police Department officers calling fellow officers "cowards" on the podcast "Your World, My View Podcast" hosted by Sotomayor. The officers called into the podcast and, as their fellow officers were driving to the scene of the shooting and answering other police calls, the two North Dallas patrol officers drove around espousing controversial opinions about police shootings. "Quit hiring cowards, they are hiring cowards ... my partner says they are hiring cowards," said one of them about rookie officers coming out of the police academy. "They are hiring ex-military and they don’t see people as human."

The Dallas Police Association later said the two officers were not a reflection of how other police officers feel, and police department officials informed the media that Internal Affairs was investigating both officers. The video was later removed from YouTube, and both officers remained on active duty but could have faced serious disciplinary action.

== Media ==
In 2015, in Orting, Washington, former mayor and city Councilman Guy "Sam" Colorossi was placed under investigation after sending out a mass email containing a 14-minute video by Sotomayor that encouraged white officers to avoid policing black communities, an Orting black police officer complained about the video's content, which the city condemned as "offensive and deplorable." Sotomayor used racially charged language in the video and alluded to well-documented incidents in which white police officers were held accountable after clashing with black citizens in communities around the country. Colorossi later apologized. Orting Mayor Joachim Pestinger posted in response that Colorossi's email should have never been sent. Colorossi told The News Tribune he did not wish to offend anyone with the email and was passing it along for informational purposes.

In July 2016, Harry Houck, a CNN law enforcement analyst promoted a video by Sotomayor on Twitter that declared African Americans are responsible for most violent crime in the United States. In the video, Sotomayor claimed that black Americans are a more serious threat than guns. Houck, a retired NYPD detective, linked to Sotomayor’s video via Twitter, saying that the radio host "knows what he’s talking about!".

Media Matters for America reported that Sotomayor once said that then-President Barack Obama "shouldn’t try to ban guns, he should ban niggas," and interviewed ex-Ku Klux Klan leader David Duke on his YouTube channel, and made an appearance on Duke's podcast and spoke of "the destruction of the black community due to the cultural pollution that is being spewed out by the Jewish media elite.” One discussion with Sotomayor and Duke was shown on the neo-Nazi website The Daily Stormer.

Sotomayor appeared on the July 16, 2018 episode of Proud Boys founder Gavin McInnes' podcast Get Off My Lawn saying that then-President Donald Trump did not do enough of "cutting off the welfare," Sotomayor also agreed with McInnes on the issue of African-American women being prone to violence and saying they were "irresponsible beings" who are raising children with "100 percent autonomy", making them violent as well.

In 2019, Sotomayor got involved in a YouTube viral video incident when he was confronted by a waitress at a Hooters restaurant for wearing a red MAGA hat and was asked if he was a supporter of President Donald Trump. The incident caused a petition to be started on Change.org, requesting that the video of the incident be removed. The petition referred to Sotomayor as someone that uses his media presence to "demean Black women and girls and Black people in general," it also stated Sotomayor was a spreader of "misogynistic and racist hatred."

Sotomayor has also been a guest on such television networks and series as On Point with Tomi Lahren on One America News Network, Jesse Watters Primetime, Blaze Media and Face the Truth.

== See also ==
- Black conservatism in the United States
