= Real Personal =

American interview and advice call-in talk show

- Presented by: Bob Berkowitz
- Country of origin: United States
- Original language: English

Production
- Running time: 60 minutes

Original release
- Network: CNBC
- Release: 1990 – 1996

Real Personal is an American interview and advice call-in talk show about human sexuality that aired on CNBC from 1990 to 1996. The show was hosted by Bob Berkowitz.

== Reception ==
Heidemarie Schumacher cited this show as an example of B-television in her article From the True, the Good, the Beautiful to the Truly Beautiful Goods—audience identification strategies on German "B-Television" programs:

The title itself encapsulates the message of 'B-TV': real people and their 'real' problems are the focus here."
