= Laura (talk show) =

- Also known as: Laura en América; Laura en acción; Laura de todos; Laura de México; Laura sin censura; Que Pase Laura
- Genre: talk show
- Created by: Laura Bozzo
- Presented by: Laura Bozzo
- Countries of origin: Peru; Mexico
- Original language: Spanish

Production
- Running time: 60 minutes
- Production company: Televisa (2011-2015)

Original release
- Network: América Televisión
- Release: February 1998 – 2001
- Network: Telemundo
- Release: 2001 – 2008
- Network: Azteca Trece
- Release: 2009 – 2010
- Network: El Canal de las Estrellas
- Release: 2011 – 2015
- Network: Imagen Televisión
- Release: 2023 – present

Laura (also known as Laura en América, Laura sin censura, Laura de todos, Laura en acción, Que Pase Laura) is a Peruvian tabloid talk show, hosted by lawyer Laura Bozzo.

The show originated as Laura en América (Laura in America) and first aired on America TV in February 1998. Bozzo had previously done a similar program called Intimidades ("Intimacies") in 1997. Laura is known for displaying various social problems such as domestic violence, adultery, alcoholism and drug addiction.

Laura en América was the most-watched program in Peru in the late 1990s and one of the most tuned-in talk show in several Latin American countries. The talk show stopped broadcasting in 2001, after the Alberto Fujimori controversy, which involved Bozzo. In the following years, Bozzo continued to record different programs with the same format, but were only transmitted abroad for the Telemundo International channel on cable television. Bozzo had planned to return to Peruvian television through Panamericana Television in 2007, but the project was canceled due to differences between her and her producers. She then returned for a short time at the Peruvian channel ATV, with a program of the same format called Laura en acción ("Laura in action"), which was cancelled due to several complaints.

== History ==
Laura en América aired in February 1998 on America TV in Peru. On 26 June 1998, while taping the 100th anniversary show, a stampede of people rushed into the Dibos Coliseum in Lima. More than 63 were injured and one elderly woman was trampled. Laura en América began being broadcast to Bolivia, Paraguay, Colombia, Chile and Ecuador in 1999.

In January 2000, Laura en América began being broadcast by Telemundo, which gained the show immense ratings and popularity. Laura en América became the top-rated show among adults in its slot in key United States markets in February 2001.

In 2009, Mexican company TV Azteca hosted Bozzo's program Laura de todos ("Laura of all"), but a year later Bozzo changed to the company Televisa, where the program was retitled as simply Laura.

== Controversy and criticism ==
The broadcasting of this program has been subject to controversy, the main one being that the program has affected the image of the Peruvian people in the rest of Latin America. Although El Nuevo Herald described it as a version “with little more flavor” of El show de Cristina, according to the Lima newspaper El Comercio it has been accused of creating a negative stereotype of Peruvians abroad, classifying the country as “toothless people, who speak lousy Spanish, only have fun in polladas, and solve their private conflicts by crying, shouting and hitting”, and thus creating a generalized rejection by their fellow countrymen. As mentioned, the violence used by the interviewees is a factor to be reckoned with, since those involved in fights and blows can be seen in the studio itself; the production of the program was accused of inducing fallacies and tensions among the participants, as well as of promoting expressions of rudeness and insults, Laura Bozzo was also accused of promoting such an environment among the audience so that they would “also participate”, shouting at the interviewees and even urging them to hit each other when they are removed from the studio.

Another of the fiercest criticisms consists in having deeply questioned the veracity of the testimonies presented due to their often implausible characteristics, which were hardly presented on Peruvian television in the 1990s without resorting to the anonymity of the protagonists, especially when showing “real cases” of adultery, incest, or family violence. A rumor that went around Peru in the mid-1990s, and which was confirmed by journalistic investigations years later, was that most of the program's guests were individuals from the poorest areas of the city of Lima, who were paid to tell on screen stories invented by the production itself. A first report by journalist Elsa Úrsula, denouncing this fact, dates back to 1999. Bozzo always denied these accusations and no further journalistic investigations were carried out. However, on 1 April 2008, Bozzo gave an interview to the radio program hosted by César Hildebrandt in which she admitted that at least one thousand panelists who participated in Laura en América had lied. She added that at the time of hosting her program she had no knowledge of this and that, since it was a television show, she could take some fictional licenses.

=== Censorship in Chile ===
In 2001, the National Television Council of Chile banned the TV show from airing on the television in Chile by fining Chilevisión for broadcasting episodes for six days. In 2006, the National Television Council again fined the following channel, Red TV, for the equivalent of more than one million dollars for broadcasting four days on the air.
