= Bevy Smith =

American television personality (born 1966)

Beverly "Bevy" Smith
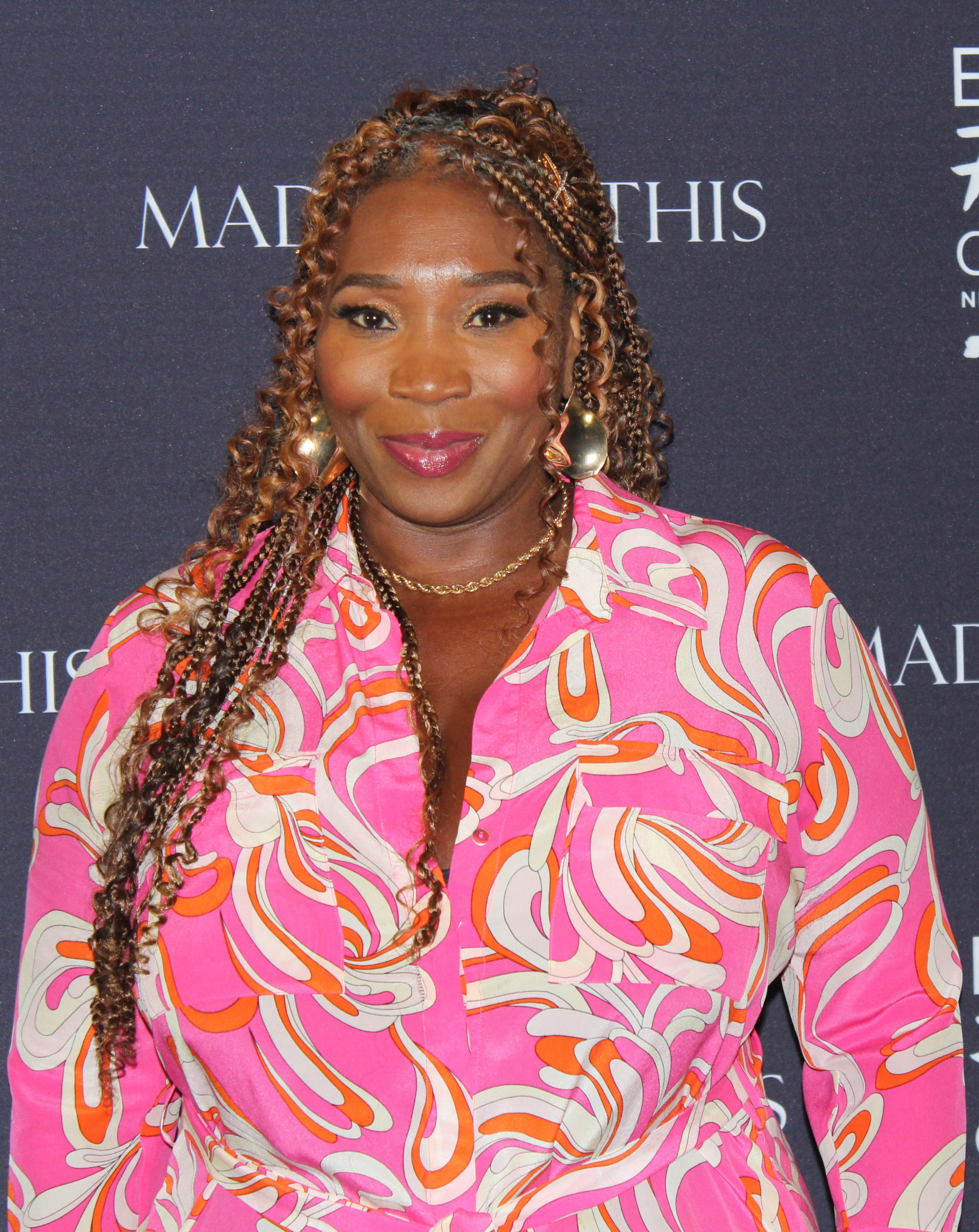
- Smith at EssenceFest 2025 in July.
- Born: November 2, 1966 (age 59); Harlem, New York, U.S.
- Occupations: Television host, business-woman, motivational speaker, actress, author
- Known for: Fashion Queens
- Website: www.bevysmith.com

Beverly "Bevy" Smith (born November 2, 1966) is an American television personality and business woman. She is best known for her work as a co-host on Bravo's fashion-themed talk show Fashion Queens. Smith is the creator of "Dinner with Bevy", a dinner party series in which she brings together people from across entertainment, fashion and media.

== Life and career ==
Bevy Smith was born, raised, and still resides in Harlem, New York. Smith would later become the senior director of luxury fashion advertising at Rolling Stone and fashion and beauty advertising director for Vibe magazine. Smith had been cast in Tim Gunn's Guide to Style but ended up passing on the opportunity. She also had a planned series on Oxygen, titled Bevy: Queen of Shops, but she also passed on that offer. Bevy later accepted a job at BET prior to her becoming a co-host on Fashion Queens.

On February 18, 2012, as a BET News correspondent, Smith hosted BET Remembers Whitney Houston. The live special featured Smith as she interviewed several friends of Houston to share memories. In February and September 2012, Smith appeared as a guest on the VH1 talk show, Big Morning Buzz Live. In December 2012, Smith appeared on Bravo's Watch What Happens Live with Jenna Jameson and Jennifer Tilly. Smith has made several appearances on the talk show, Bethenny. On June 3, 2014, Smith appeared as guest co-host on the talk show, The View.

From 2015 to 2023, she hosted a daily, one hour radio show on SiriusXM's RadioAndy called Bevelations. She also appears on BET's Wendy's Style Squad, where she recaps award show fashion with Wendy Williams and other co-hosts.

Since 2017, she has co-hosted the entertainment news show Page Six TV. Page Six TV is the television version of the well known Page Six section of the New York Post.

In 2021, she published her memoir Bevelations: Lessons from a Mutha, Auntie, Bestie.

She appears in a recurring role as the character Aunt Tammy in the Amazon Prime Video comedy series Harlem.
