= Tamer Amin =

Egyptian television presenter and interviewer

- تامر أمين
- Born: 10 September 1971 (age 54)
- Occupation: television presenter

Tamer Amin (Arabic: تامر أمين; born 10 September 1971) is a former Egyptian television presenter and interviewer for Masr El-Nahrda (Egypt Today), a popular Egyptian live television talk show from Cairo, which airs on the Egyptian National TV (ERTU). He has also had content broadcast on Al Hayat TV.

== Positions ==
Amin is known for being strongly supportive of the Egyptian government. He has expressed his views on a number of issues:

- Responding to a question regarding whether or not Egyptian men who marry Israeli women should have their Egyptian citizenship revoked, Amin stated "Everything should be taken from them, not just their citizenship."
- In response to a video purported to document a gay wedding ceremony, Amin said "I don’t have a problem with anyone doing something wrong, and keeping it private ... but if that person is proud of it, and doesn’t try to hide it ... that’s a disaster."
- Amin expressed support for Egypt and Iran acquiring nuclear weapons, arguing that "As a deterrent. I support Egypt's policy of turning the Middle East into a nuclear-free zone. But if a country like Israel has nuclear weapons, it has a deterrent, and all of us Arabs are afraid of it."
