= All About Sex =

- Genre: Talk show
- Presented by: Margaret Cho; Heather McDonald; Marissa Jaret Winokur; Tiffanie Davis Henry
- Country of origin: United States
- Original language: English
- No. of seasons: 1
- No. of episodes: 6

Original release
- Network: TLC
- Release: January 10 – February 14, 2015

All About Sex is an American talk show that premiered on TLC on January 10, 2015. The show is hosted by several panelists discussing human sexuality.

The panel consists of Margaret Cho, Heather McDonald, Marissa Jaret Winokur and Tiffanie Davis Henry.
