= Ron Barrier =

American spokesperson

Ron Barrier was the former national spokesperson and media coordinator of American Atheists, and he frequently appeared in U.S. media to present arguments from an atheist perspective. He debated Christian apologist William Lane Craig over the existence of God.

Barrier produced the cable TV program "The Atheist Viewpoint" in Staten Island, New York.

Ron Barrier died in 2020.
