= Fashion Queens =

- Genre: Talk show
- Presented by: Bevy Smith; Derek J; Miss Lawrence
- Country of origin: United States
- Original language: English
- No. of seasons: 3
- No. of episodes: 66

Production
- Executive producers: Deirdre Connolly; Glenda Hersh; Lauren Eskelin; Michael Davies; Steven Weinstock
- Camera setup: Multiple
- Running time: 20–23 minutes
- Production companies: True Entertainment; Embassy Row; Sony Pictures Television

Original release
- Network: Bravo
- Release: March 17, 2013 – June 14, 2015

Fashion Queens is an American fashion-based talk show that aired on Bravo. The series premiered on March 17, 2013, with a three-week trial run. Fashion Queens is hosted by Bevy Smith, Derek J, and Miss Lawrence. Derek J and Miss Lawrence both made several appearances on The Real Housewives of Atlanta. Following the series' three-week trial run in March 2013, the first season continued on April 14, 2013. The second season premiere on November 3, 2013, which coincided with the sixth season premiere of The Real Housewives of Atlanta. Fashion Queens was filmed in New York City.

In April 2014, Bravo renewed Fashion Queens for a third season, which premiered on November 9, 2014.

On August 8, 2015, host Bevy Smith confirmed that the series had been cancelled.

== Segments ==
- The Week in Fashion: Latest fashion news
- Reading Room: The hosts dissect celebrities' fashion
- Right or Ratchet: The hosts decide if celebrities' outfits are Right or Ratchet
- Giving Me Wife: Reviewing The Real Housewives fashion
- Style GPS: The hosts review fashion news from around the world
- Ask a Queen: The hosts answer questions from Instagram and Twitter
- Gag Award: The hosts give awards for their favorite fashion looks

== Episodes ==
Season	Episodes	Originally released	
Season	Episodes	First released	Last released
1	11	March 17, 2013	June 9, 2013
2	28	January 12, 2014	June 8, 2014
3	27	November 9, 2014	June 14, 2015
