= Aisay Nahi Chalay Ga =

- ایسے نہیں چلے گا
- Genre: Current affairs Talk
- Presented by: Aamir Liaquat Hussain (2016–2018) Fizza Akbar Khan (2019–present)
- Country of origin: Pakistan
- Original language: Urdu
- No. of episodes: 164

Production
- Production locations: Karachi, Sindh, Pakistan
- Running time: 40 minutes

Original release
- Network: Bol News
- Release: 18 November 2016 – present

Aisay Nahi Chalay Ga (Urdu: ایسے نہیں چلےگا) (Note: English: This Can't Be Tolerated) is a Pakistani current affairs and political talk show, originally hosted by Aamir Liaquat on Bol News. The show covers the top stories and current affairs of Pakistan. It airs every Monday to Friday at prime time from 10:00pm to 11:00pm PST, with repeat telecasts at 01:00am the following day.

The show was hosted by Aamir Liaquat since its pilot episode, until his resignation from the channel in November 2017. It was thereafter hosted by a character known as Mr. Qaum, who wore a V mask and directly addressed the audience. In April 2018, Liaquat rejoined the channel and continued his transmissions of the show. In 2019, Aamir Liaquat again left the channel and joined PTV network.

Fizza Akbar Khan currently hosts the show.

== Controversies ==
In January 2017, Liaquat called out and prominently criticized several Pakistani liberal and leftist personalities on his show for their political and ideological views. One such focus of attention was Tarek Fatah, one of the staunchest critics of Pakistan. The two were later involved in a Twitter feud.

On 26 January 2017, the Pakistan Electronic Media Regulatory Authority (PEMRA) ordered a suspension of Liaquat's show over "hate speech". The media watchdog's notification stated that Liaquat had aired during his show, from 2 January to 24 January, allegations comprising derogatory remarks, incitement to violence, casting of aspersions, and accusations of anti-state or anti-religious activities against various individuals. The suspension came after Liaquat had lashed out at some civil society activists on his show for blaming the country's intelligence agencies over the disappearance of five online bloggers, who were accused of hosting blasphemous posts or content critical of the military on their pages.

However, the Sindh High Court granted a stay order against PEMRA's decision and allowed Liaquat to continue his broadcasts until a verdict was issued on the matter. The Supreme Court of Pakistan then directed Bol to cease airing the show or face contempt of court charges, and Bol agreed to follow the court's order. Later, the Islamabad High Court overturned PEMRA's ban, allowing the show to continue its transmission on 28 February 2017. Amnesty International criticised the Pakistani government over its purported inaction, terming the show's content a "smear campaign" against human rights and civil society activists.

During the suspension, the show was renamed to Qaum Kay Saath Aisay Nahi Chalay Ga. It featured a dummy cartoon disguised in a Fawkes mask who talked to the audience in a robotic voice-over. The show was reverted to its original name and format when Aamir Liaquat was reinstated as host. On 15 August 2017, Liaquat resigned from the show live on-air, but returned soon afterwards.

Following Liaquat's second resignation from the channel on 18 November 2017, the character was reinstated under the name "Mr. Qaum". By April 2018, Aamir Liaquat rejoined the show as its host after he returned to Bol News.
