= Chris Spencer (actor) =

American actor

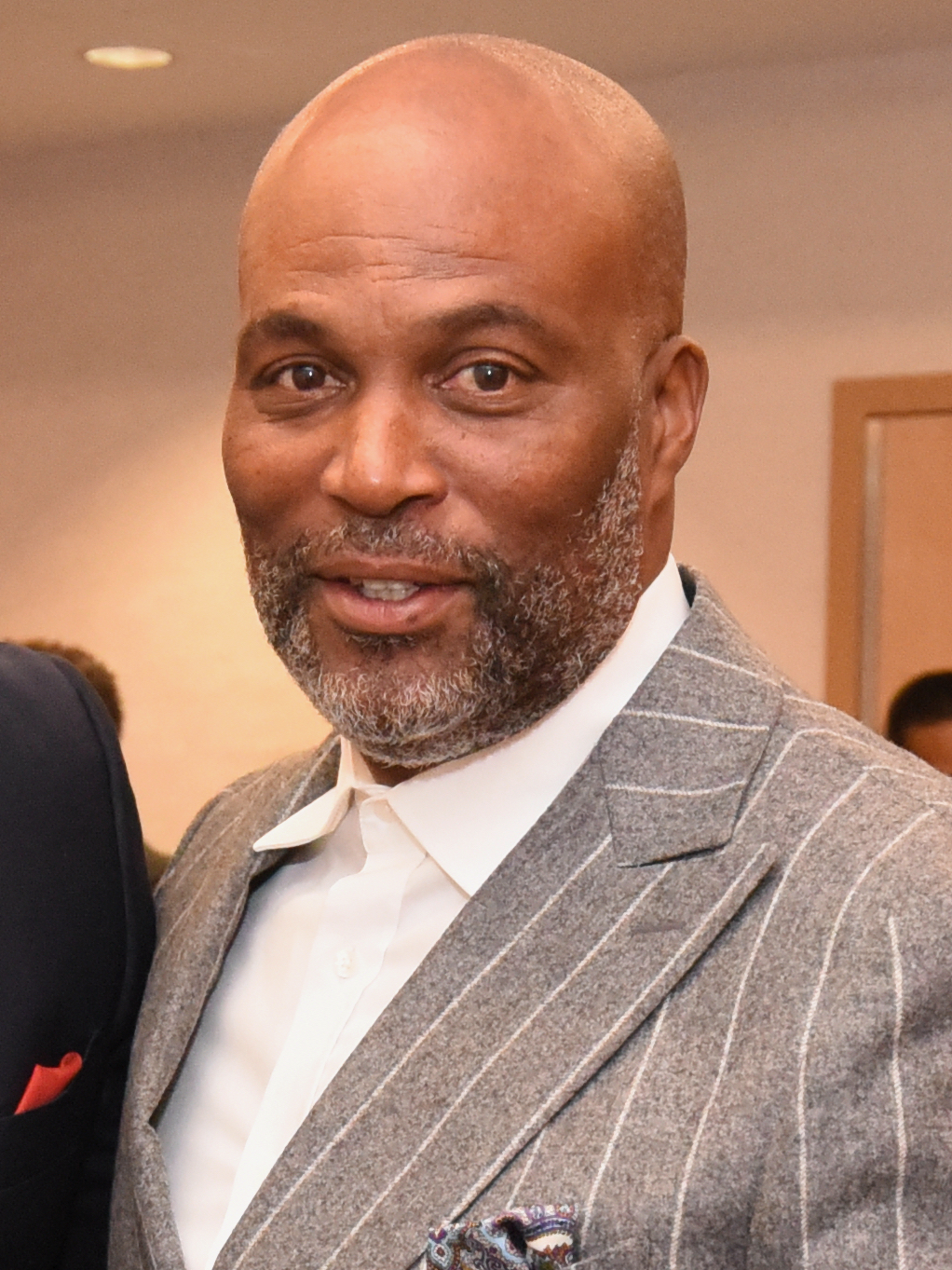
- Spencer in 2023
- Occupations: Actor; comedian; writer; producer
- Years active: 1990–present

Chris Spencer is an American director, actor, comedian, writer, and producer.

== Career ==
Spencer was the inaugural host of Vibe, a syndicated late-night talk show adapted from the magazine of the same name. Later he appeared in numerous film and television projects including Don't Be a Menace to South Central While Drinking Your Juice in the Hood, The Sixth Man, Significant Others, and Postal. In addition to on-screen work, he built a substantial career as a writer, contributing to projects for the Wayans family, Jamie Foxx, and playing a notable role in the early development of Nick Cannon’s Wild 'N Out. He maintains an active career as a stand-up comedian with performances on The Chris Rock Show, on HBO, Jimmy Kimmel Live!, on ABC, and HBO's Def Comedy Jam.

Spencer co-hosts a weekly podcast, Minivan Men, with comedians Al Madrigal and Maz Jobrani. Spencer's writing credits include the scripted comedy series Real Husbands of Hollywood. In 2017, he co-created the television series White Famous.

== Filmography ==
=== Film ===
Year	Title	Role	Notes
1994	Blankman	Stevens	
1994	A Low Down Dirty Shame	Benny	
1996	Don't Be a Menace	"Preach"	
1997	The Sixth Man	Jimmy Stubbs	
1997	Fakin' Da Funk	Charlie	
1998	Every Dog Has Its Day	Maurice	
1999	Dill Scallion	"Vibe" Host	
2001	All About You	Owen	
2001	Two Can Play That Game	Lying Man #2	
2003	Love Chronicles	Gavin	
2003	Road Dogs	Ray "Baby Ray-Ray"	
2003	Sin	Vincent Peavey	
2004	Out-of-Body Experience	Josh	Short
2005	Jepardee!	Alex Getback	Short
2007	Delta Farce	Co-Pilot	
2007	Postal	Officer Greg Sharp	
2007	BloodRayne 2: Deliverance	Bob, The Bartender	Video
2007	Redrum	The Waiter	
2007	Bricks	Voice	Short
2008	Ball Don't Lie	New York	
2009	Black Dynamite	Militant #1	
2009	The Family Hour	Comic	Video
2010	The 41-Year-Old Virgin	Officer Beat	Video
2010	For (Stuffed) Colored Girls		Short
2010	Something Like a Business	Payton Profit	
2012	Bad Ass	Martin Sr.	
2023	Back on the Strip		Feature film directorial debut

=== Television ===
Year	Title	Role	Notes
1992-1993	In Living Color	Himself	3 episodes
1993	The John Larroquette Show	Marine #1	Episode: "My Hero"
1996	The Show	Trent Vance	Main cast
1997	Vibe	Himself	Host
1998	Getting Personal	Wesley Warren Jones	Episode: "Bring in 'Da Milo, Bring in 'Da Robyn"
1998	Rude Awakening	Ritch	Episode: "An Embarrassment of Ritch's"
1999-2000	The Jamie Foxx Show	Curtis	Recurring cast: season 4
2001	Soul Food	Drew	Episode: "Nice Work If You Can Get It"
2003	Half & Half	Darrell	Episode: "The Big Phat Mouth Episode: Part 2"
2003	The District		Episode: "Acceptable Losses"
2004	Second Time Around	Ted	Episode: "Ryan Sees Party People"
2004	ER	Keith Trager	Episode: "Shot in the Dark"
2004	Significant Others	Devon	Main cast
2005	Charmed	Smitty	Episode: "Battle of the Hexes"
2006	Cuts	Manager	Episode: "Black Don't Crack"
2010	Meet the Browns	Michael	Episode: "Meet the Dealmaker"
2011	Let's Stay Together	Ellis	Episode: "Back Together Again"
2013	Real Husbands of Hollywood	Christopher	Episode: "Easy Bake Kevin"
2015	Being Mary Jane	Chris	Recurring cast: season 2
2015	Born Again Virgin	Charles	Recurring cast: season 1

=== Writer ===
- 2005 Wild 'N Out
- 2002 Jamie Foxx: I Might Need Security
- 2014 The Youngs

=== Producer ===
- 2005 Baggin'
- 2001 Get Up Stand Up Comedy
