= Talkback Live =

Talk show (1994–2003)

Talkback Live is a talk show on CNN that lasted from 1994 until 2003.

It aired from 3 to 4 pm Eastern Time and was hosted at various times by Susan Rook, Yolanda L. Gaskins, Bobbie Battista, Jeff Hullinger, Karyn Bryant, and Arthel Neville. The audience participation show originated from a specially constructed stage in the atrium of the CNN Center. It was canceled in favor of extending Live From for an additional hour.

== Concept ==
It has been speculated that in 1993 media mogul Ted Turner, founder of the 24-hour news network, CNN, was inspired to create a talk show after walking through the atrium of the company's headquarters in Atlanta, The CNN Center. As the story goes, Turner walked through the ground floor of the CNN Center and saw the sunlight shining down into the atrium. He had a vision that the side of the atrium, in front of The Turner Store, would be a great place for a talk show. So, one year later, and after millions of dollars in renovations, a portion of The CNN Center food court was transformed into a state-of-the-art broadcast studio that seated over two hundred people and Talkback Live was created. The show was developed and executive produced by CNN's top female executive, Gail Evans. One of CNN's top producers was tapped to head up this new concept, Teya Ryan, an award winning producer in charge of CNN's environmental features.

== The show ==
Talkback Live was billed as the first truly interactive television show. Merging new technology, the internet with television, viewers of the program could call-in like many of CNN's other talk style shows. Viewers could also fax or go online with partner CompuServe to post their comments on the show's topic in a custom chatroom. Comments from faxes and CompuServe were often incorporated into the show. What made the show interactive is that the host would allow panelist and audience members to respond to the fax and online comments. Also, the show partnered with MCI and American University in Washington, D.C. to have students and professors provide comments and questions via desktop video technology. During the first year, Talkback Live went on a 50-city tour. The show became part of an interactive facility at the Smithsonian's Museum of American History. Visitors to the 100-seat Information Age Theater were able to watch the show on a 12-monitor video wall and, one day a week, contribute their comments via videoconferencing.

Talkback Live originally aired from 1-2 PM EDT on CNN's domestic USA network, in the time slot previously occupied by Sonya Live. The show was later pushed back to 3pm to make way for CNN Today.

CNN partnered with online service CompuServe to provide an online forum to host comments on the show's topics. This would later serve as the catalyst to CNN Online or what is now known as CNN.com. The interactive portions of Talkback Live were developed by Chet Burgess, CNN's Executive Producer for Interactive Programming.

Discount drug store chain Drug Emporium was a major sponsor of Talkback Live during the first year of the show. General admission tickets to the show could be found in its Atlanta area stores along with a life-sized poster cutout of Talkback Live host, Susan Rook.

Talkback Live would tackle hot button issues like abortion, sex education, homosexuality and race in America just to name a few. The show's topic was often influenced by what was happening in the news on that day. During the early days of Talkback Live, many of the show's topics were about the O.J. Simpson murder trial. The first show was repeatedly interrupted by coverage of the Simpson case. Many of Talkback Live's panelists went on to further their careers after Talkback Live.

== The hosts ==
=== Susan Rook ===
Susan Rook was tapped to host this new and innovative show. Rook was a veteran news anchor. She had previously anchored CNN's Prime News with co-anchor Bernard Shaw. She worked her last prime time shift on July 28, 1994, and hosted the premiere show of Talkback Live on Monday, August 22, 1994 at 1PM ET. Rook served as a moderator in the third Presidential debates in 1992. Rook was a graduate of George Mason University in Fairfax, Virginia. She had previously worked at TV stations in Ft. Myers, Florida and New Orleans. Rook has often said that she was "a traffic cop on the information superhighway".

Susan was joined on the show with second mics Chris Askew and Preety Khurana who was from London. Chris died in 2019. Preety left the show to return to London in 1997 and lives on with her husband Carl and their daughter.

After Rook left CNN, the show had a string of recurring hosts. Joie Chen, Yolanda L. Gaskins, Bill Hemmer, Daryn Kagan, Leon Harris, Chris Rose, and Vince Cellini were among the CNN talent to host the show. Non-CNN personalities to host Talkback Live include Tavis Smiley and Jane Whitney.

=== Miles O'Brien and Bobbie Battista ===
Eventually in 1998 CNN anchors Bobbie Battista and Miles O'Brien were chosen to host Talkback Live. Miles O'Brien would host the show Monday and Tuesday. O'Brien and Bobbie Battista would host the show together on Wednesdays and Battista would host Thursday and Friday. After nearly a year, Miles O'Brien was dropped from the show, and Bobbie Battista became the sole host.

=== Jeff Hullinger ===
For a brief time, while CNN was searching for a replacement for Battista, Jeff Hullinger, former host at WAGA-TV and current anchor at Atlanta NBC station WXIA-TV, served as interim host of Talkback Live.

=== Arthel Neville ===
When Bobbie Battista left CNN, another search for a host began. In 2002, CNN hired Arthel Neville as the new host of Talkback Live. The show was re-branded with new logos, graphics and music.

== The panelists ==
Over the years Talkback Live featured panelists on a variety of topics. Some of the most noteworthy panelists include Major League Baseball player Tom Glavine, CNN Legal Analysts Greta Van Susteren and Roger Cossack, political commentator and feminist Susan Estrich, U.S. Representative J. C. Watts, Jr., CNN Correspondent Art Harris, Defense attorney Ed Garland and political commentator and author Julianne Malveaux.

There were some panelists that used Talkback Live as a stepping stone to bigger opportunities.

=== Sean Hannity ===
Sean Hannity was a popular conservative radio talk show host in Atlanta. He appeared numerous times on Talkback Live. Hannity is now a high profile conservative political commentator on CNN's competitor, Fox News Channel.

=== Nancy Grace ===
Nancy Grace, a former Atlanta prosecutor was a regular panelist on Talkback Live. She was very vocal about her opinion of O.J. Simpson's guilt during the murder trial. Grace hosted a show on Court TV and went on to host of a show on CNN's sister network, HLN (formerly Headline News), Nancy Grace.

=== Tavis Smiley ===
Tavis Smiley was a political commentator that made frequent appearances on CNN, including Talkback Live. Smiley hosted the show on several occasions. Tavis Smiley is now a successful author that has appeared multiple times on the New York Times Bestseller list.

== The audience ==
Talkback Live was taped in an open air studio in the middle of the CNN Center atrium in downtown Atlanta. Filling the 200 plus seats of the audience was no small task. The show had several staff members dedicated to recruiting audience members for the daily show. Many tourists taking the CNN Studio Tour were often persuaded to sit in the audience. The recruiters or "Audience Coordinators" as they were called often solicited people in popular downtown Atlanta spots with the promise of appearing on live television and a 15-minute MCI pre-paid calling card (MCI sponsored the program's call-in comment line).

== The end ==
Despite consistent ratings, in 2003, Talkback Live was canceled so CNN could extend its coverage of the second Gulf War. The program's end brought about the extension of Live From with Kyra Phillips and Miles O'Brien to a third hour. Talkback Live's final broadcast was on March 7, 2003.
