= Sex, Toys & Chocolate =

- Starring: Robin Milhausen (co-host); Michael Cho (co-host); Roy Roman (correspondent)
- Country of origin: Canada
- No. of episodes: 80

Production
- Executive producer: Patricia Hollinger
- Running time: 20 - 22 minutes

Original release
- Network: Life Network / Discovery Health
- Release: 2003 – 2005

Sex, Toys, & Chocolate was a talk show produced by Alliance Atlantis on cable and satellite in Canada from 2003 to 2005. Premiering on March 5, 2004, new episodes appeared on Life Network and older ones ran on Discovery Health network. It was hosted by Robin Milhausen and Michael Cho. Each show opens with interspersed scenes of Milhausen and Cho discussing some sex-related topic with three women and three men respectively. The men and women are then brought together for a group discussion, followed by role-playing or trivia games at the end. Field reporter Roy Roman interviews people on the streets of Miami about the same topic, which typically include oral sex, masturbation, fetishes, orgasm, pornography, and the like. The show includes explicit language and discussion not seen on American television, and is distinguished from other sex-related television series (such as those hosted by Sue Johanson and sex therapist Ruth Westheimer (Dr. Ruth) in that it is primarily designed to convey the opinions and experiences of average people and not to convey expert advice.
