= Robin Milhausen =

Canadian sexologist and professor

Robin Milhausen (born August 25, 1975) is a Canadian sexologist, professor and former talk show host. She edits the newsletter Sexual Science, published by the Society for the Scientific Study of Sexuality.

== Early life ==
Milhausen was born in Kitchener, Ontario and raised in Collingwood, Ontario, on Georgian Bay. She decided at a young age to become a sex educator. She cites fellow Canadian sexologist Sue Johanson as a role model.

== Education ==
Milhausen received a bachelor's degree in psychology and a master's degree in Human Development and Human Relations at the University of Guelph in Ontario and went on to earn a Ph.D. at Indiana University, with a minor from the Kinsey Institute of Human Sexuality.

In 2003, Milhausen won the Outstanding Student Research Award from the Society for the Scientific Study of Sexuality.

== Career ==
In 2004, Milhausen began hosting the talk show Sex, Toys & Chocolate on Life Network and Discovery Health in Canada. Since the show began, she finished her Ph.D. and engaged in a post-doctoral fellowship in 2004–05 at Emory University in Atlanta while commuting to Toronto several times each month to tape the talk show. In 2005–06, she engaged in another post-doctoral fellowship at the Social Justice and Sexual Health Research Centre at the University of Windsor. In 2006, Milhausen became an assistant professor of sexuality and family relations at the University of Guelph.

Milhausen was the resident sexologist for the Canadian talk show Steven and Chris. She is an elected Fellow of the Society for the Scientific Study of Sexuality.

== Personal life ==
Milhausen married Steve Jett in late 2004, gave birth to son Leo in 2006, and daughter Molly in 2010.
