= Él y ella =

- Genre: Talk show
- Created by: Gigi Graciette
- Presented by: Antonio Farré & Gigi Graciette (1995–1998); Guillermo Quintanilla & Sofia Webber (1998–2001)
- Theme music composer: Oscar Castro-Neves (1995–1999)
- Country of origin: United States
- Original language: Spanish
- No. of seasons: 6
- No. of episodes: 458

Production
- Executive producers: Gigi Graciette (1995–1998); Rubeca Montañez Montes (1998–2001)
- Production locations: Raleigh Studios; Hollywood, California, United States (1995-1998); Estudios TV Azteca; Mexico City, Mexico (1998-2001)
- Running time: 60 minutes

Original release
- Network: Telemundo
- Release: 17 April 1995 – 12 January 2001

Él y ella (He & She or Him & Her) is a Spanish-language talk show broadcast by Telemundo from 1995 until 2001. The show was hosted by Antonio Farré and Gigi Graciette (who also created and produced the show) from 1995 to 1998, and by Guillermo Quintanilla and Sofia Webber from 1998 until the show's cancellation in 2001. It was the first talk show to feature two hosts, with a male ("Él") and female ("Ella") exploring problems that affect average couples and individuals. The show aired weekdays at 3:00 p.m. Eastern Time, preceding the Sevcec show.

== History ==
The original El y Ella logo, used from 1995 to 1999.

Hosts Antonio Farré and Gigi Graciette (replaced by Guillermo Quintanilla and Sofia Webber in 1998) talked about every imaginable topic about problems that affect average couples and individuals, while different panelists and celebrity guests offered their first hand experience on the different subjects. The show became the highest-rated afternoon show on Telemundo. El y Ella was taped at Raleigh Studios in Los Angeles, California during its early years, sharing its soundstage with fellow talk show, Sevcec. Midway into its run, El y Ella began taping in Mexico City. In 1998, both Farré and Graciette left the show for unknown reasons, and were replaced by Guillermo Quintanilla and Sofia Webber, respectively. The show was cancelled in 2001.
