= Masr El-Nahrda =

- Genre: News
- Country of origin: Egypt
- Original language: Arabic

Original release
- Network: Egypt 1
- Release: 2011 – present

Masr El-Nahrda or Masr El-Naharda...Benehlam li Bokra (Egypt today...We Dream of Tomorrow) is a live television talk show aired on ERTU and based in Cairo, Egypt. The show descended from the now defunct El beit beitak/el beet beetak show.
