= Antonio Farré =

Spanish television personality and actor

- Born: Antonio Manuel Croissier; August 22, 1961 (age 64); Las Palmas de Gran Canaria, Spain
- Occupations: Television personality, actor
- Years active: 1980s–present
- Website: http://www.antoniofarre.com

Antonio Manuel Croissier (born August 22, 1961), known professionally as Antonio Farré, is a Spanish actor, voice-over artist, and television host.

== Early life ==
Antonio Farré was born in Las Palmas de Gran Canaria, Spain. In 1974, he and his family moved to Mexico.

== Career ==
Farré has worked in Mexican Soap Operas such as Chispita, La Fiera, Rosa Salvaje, Cicatrices del Alma and television shows such as Mujer, Casos de la Vida Real with Silvia Pinal. In Mexico, he also worked in several films including Silencio Mortal with Sergio Goyri, and “Trampa Mortal” with Jorge Luke and Felicia Mercado. In the United States, he worked in numerous projects such the film Inside Edge, as well as the television series Baywatch starring David Hasselhoff. Farré also appeared in NBC’s Soap Opera Days of Our Lives.

=== El y Ella ===
From 1995 to 1998, he was the co-host of the daytime talk show El y Ella alongside Gigi Graciette, which aired on Telemundo. The show came to be known as one of the highest-rated television shows of the network. Both Farré and Graciette left the show in 1998 and were replaced by Sofia Webber and Guillermo Quintanilla until the show's cancellation in 2001.

== Other work ==
Farré currently has his own production company, A.F. Productions, where he directs and produces commercials, infomercials, and Music Videos for the Hispanic Market.
