= Revealing Same Sex Secret Crush =

- The Jenny Jones Show episode
- One of the episode's title cards; guests Jonathan Schmitz (front) and Scott Amedure (back) are pictured embracing.
- Episode no.: Season 4
- Presented by: Jenny Jones
- Production code: 4138
- Original air date: October 17, 1996 (Note: This episode was originally scheduled to premiere in May 1995 in syndication (like all other episodes), but was ultimately pulled. It eventually aired on October 17, 1996 on Court TV (a cable network that didn't generally broadcast the show), as part of their coverage of a civil trial against the Jenny Jones and her crew.)
- Running time: 45 minutes

"Revealing Same Sex Secret Crush" (Note: The episode was reported in the media under several alternative titles, including "Same Sex Crushes", "Same-Sex Secret Crushes", and "Secret Crushes on People of the Same Sex".) is an episode of the American daytime talk show The Jenny Jones Show. Taped on March 6, 1995, the episode was intended to air as part of the show's fourth season during the May sweeps. The episode featured six guests who were invited to meet a self-proclaimed secret admirer. The guests, however, were not directly informed that their secret admirers were all of the same sex as them. Each secret admirer publicly revealed their crush to a guest, with presenter Jenny Jones interviewing the two afterwards. Three days after the episode was taped, one of the guests, Jonathan Schmitz, killed his secret admirer, Scott Amedure. As a result, the episode was shelved and Schmitz was charged with first-degree murder. The episode was eventually broadcast on October 17, 1996, as part of Court TV's coverage of an ensuing civil trial against The Jenny Jones Show.

"Revealing Same Sex Secret Crush" followed a rising trend of talk show episodes about secret crushes. Prior to their appearance on the show, all guests went through a series of pre-screening interviews. While the crushes were unsure of their secret admirer's sex, producers informed them that their secret admirer could either be a man or woman. Amedure's murder was widely covered by the news media and resulted in a national discussion over violence toward gay people. Schmitz's use of the gay panic defense in his criminal trial drew sharp criticism from many gay rights advocates. Amedure's family subsequently filed a negligence lawsuit against The Jenny Jones Show. The court ultimately found that the producers could not reasonably anticipate a murder resulting from Amedure's and Schmitz's appearance on the show.

The episode and its aftermath resulted in a national media frenzy. It received mixed reactions from audiences, with debate over whether The Jenny Jones Show held responsibility for Schmitz's subsequent actions. Jones and the show's producers defended the episode, claiming that the topic of same-sex crushes was light-hearted and that Schmitz's actions following the episode's taping were unforeseeable. The controversy surrounding the episode resulted in a national debate over the negative effects of shock value and tabloid television in the United States, which prompted some television executives to tone down the sensationalized nature of their programs. The episode and the subsequent murder of Amedure were the subject of several true crime documentaries.

== Synopsis ==
The episode opened with presenter Jenny Jones questioning the studio audience over how they would reveal a secret crush to another person. Jones specifically asked if they would "tell that person that you're gay and you hope that he is on national television", which resulted in an eruption of cheers and applause. Jones then explained that six guests were flown in to appear on the show in order to meet a secret admirer. The guests, however, were not aware of their secret admirer's sex. The secret admirers were individually brought out prior to their crushes and were briefly interviewed by Jones. Jones asked each secret admirer to explain how they knew of their crush in addition to discussing any romantic or sexual fantasies they had about them. While the secret admirer was interviewed, their crush was backstage in a green room wearing soundproof headphones. Following the secret admirer's interview, Jones called for the crush to remove their headphones and enter the stage. The secret admirer then had the opportunity to express their feelings for their crush. For some of the crushes, a video of their secret admirer discussing their romantic or sexual fantasies was replayed. Jones then conducted a brief interview between the two, in which the crush had an opportunity to explain if they were interested in pursuing a relationship with their secret admirer. In addition to the questions asked by Jones, the guests also answered questions from various audience members.

The first secret admirer introduced was Jennifer Blevins, a transsexual woman with a crush on bartender Richard Johnson. While Johnson found her attractive, he rejected Blevins once she revealed her transsexual identity. The second secret admirer introduced was Gary Palmer, a gay man with a crush on Mr. Hotlanta contest winner Dean Steve. Steve, who was also gay, rejected Palmer as he was already in a relationship. Jones then introduced Scott Amedure, a gay man interested in acquaintance Jonathan Schmitz; a mutual friend of the men, Donna Riley, accompanied them on stage. After Amedure revealed his crush, Schmitz claimed that he was flattered but "definitely heterosexual". Following this revelation, Jones introduced Ericka Davis, a woman with a crush on her fiancé's co-worker, Sara Jimenez. Jimenez rejected Davis as she was not interested in pursuing a same-sex relationship. Jones then introduced Roney Perez, a gay man with a crush on dancehall patron Jim Kirby. Kirby claimed that Perez was not his type, although he was still open to a date. Finally, Eric Smith revealed that he had a crush on Dave Ligget, a straight zookeeper that frequented the same mall as him. Ligget was not interested in a romantic relationship; however, he claimed that he was open to a friendship with Smith. Jones ended the episode by recapping the outcome between each secret admirer and their respective crush, in addition to asking viewers to call into the show if they were interested in participating in another same-sex crush episode.

== Production ==
According to Jones, episodes about secret crushes were "a staple of daytime TV talk shows" in the 1990s. The Jenny Jones Show had previously aired several episodes that covered the topic, such as the October 1994 episode "Secret Gay Crushes". This episode featured "same-sex couples talking matter-of-factly about their feelings for each other." Jones enjoyed the topic of secret crushes, stating, "Secret-crush shows are always fun ... I loved the 'same-sex' angle and I'm always looking for ways to include gay people in our shows." Topic selection was the responsibility of the show's producers, who typically presented Jones with an episode's topic the night before its taping. Producers provided Jones with a folder of background information on the guests and a loose script to follow. Jones claimed that she had virtually no involvement in writing or planning the episode, although she believed the episode's topic was "light-hearted".

On a previous episode of The Jenny Jones Show, a notice—known as a cart—was posted for individuals who wanted to reveal a secret crush on national television. After conducting a pre-screening interview with the self-proclaimed secret admirer, producers cold called the secret admirer's crush to see if they had any interest in appearing on the show. The pre-screening interview for each crush occurred over a series of telephone conversations. The producers did not inform the crushes of their secret admirer's identity; rather, they were only informed that the secret admirer could either be a man or woman. However, one of the guests later claimed that producers intentionally led him to believe that his secret admirer was a woman. The guests were not paid for their appearance on the show, but were reimbursed for incurred expenses, such as from missing work.

According to Jim Paratore, president of Telepictures Productions, the show's production company, all guests were fully briefed on the episode's contents prior to their appearance. Producer Karen Campbell claimed that "[all guests] came on of their choice and had fun." Jones further contended that the episode was not meant to humiliate anyone. Producers did not screen guests to determine if any of them had a history of mental illness. A sociologist claimed that she reached out to producers prior to the episode's taping in order to inform them of "the dangers of ambush TV." Taped on March 6, 1995, in Chicago, the episode was intended to air as part of the show's fourth season during the May sweeps. The episode was shelved after Schmitz murdered Amedure; however, it was eventually broadcast on October 17, 1996, as part of Court TV's coverage of an ensuing civil trial against The Jenny Jones Show.

== Murder and litigation ==
The testimony of Jenny Jones was widely covered by the news media.

On March 9, 1995, three days after the episode was taped, Amedure left a "sexually suggestive" note (Note: The note read: "John. If you want it 'off' you'll have to ask me. P.S. It takes a special tool. Guess Who.") on Schmitz's doorstep. Upon examination of the note, Schmitz purchased a 12-gauge shotgun, drove to Amedure's home, and killed him by firing two shots into his chest. Schmitz immediately called 911 at a nearby gas station to confess to the killing. He was subsequently arrested and charged with first-degree murder. Schmitz's attorneys claimed that a combination of factors was responsible for his actions: bipolar disorder, Graves' disease, suicidal tendencies, and a childhood experience involving public humiliation. Schmitz's attorneys used the gay panic defense, in which they argued that Schmitz had become emotionally unstable due to humiliation over the revelation of a same-sex crush. Jones and the show's producers provided testimony at trial.

On November 13, 1996, a jury convicted Schmitz of the lesser charge of second-degree murder; the jury initially leaned toward a first-degree murder conviction, although it believed there were unanswered questions concerning Schmitz's state of mind during the crime. Schmitz was sentenced to 25 to 50 years in prison, in which he would be eligible for parole starting in 2017. When asked about the verdict, a juror stated: "We saw the show as a catalyst in a young man's life who had a lot of problems. It sent his life back into an emotional tailspin." Schmitz initially served two years of his sentence before the Michigan Court of Appeals overturned his conviction; the court claimed that Schmitz's attorneys should have had the ability to remove a juror prior to the trial. However, Schmitz was retried and convicted in 1999, with the original sentence reinstated. Schmitz was granted parole and released from prison on August 22, 2017.

In August 1995, Amedure's family filed a civil lawsuit against The Jenny Jones Show, Warner Bros., and Telepictures Productions. Amedure's family alleged that the show's producers were negligent in Amedure's death, for which they sought $75.1 million in damages. Represented by Geoffrey Fieger, Amedure's family specifically alleged that Schmitz was "ambushed" on the show by the revelation of a same-sex crush and that producers should have known that this segment would incite violence. Conversely, the show's owners argued that Schmitz knew his secret admirer could either be a man or woman and that the episode did not play a role in Amedure's death. Jones testified at the trial, which was widely reported on by the news media and increased public interest in the case. In addition to Jones, testimony was provided by Riley, Perez, and the show's producers.

On May 7, 1999, the jury found in favor of Amedure's family in an 8–1 decision; it awarded Amedure's family $25 million in damages. However, this decision was appealed by The Jenny Jones Show and its producers. On October 23, 2002, the Michigan Court of Appeals overturned this judgment in a 2-1 panel decision. The court found that Amedure's murder was "unforeseeable" and that the show "had no duty to anticipate and prevent the act of murder committed by Schmitz three days after leaving [the] studio and hundreds of miles away". Jones claimed that she was "elated" over the reversal, further stating, "Scott Amedure's murder was a horrible tragedy, but I have always believed that it was fundamentally wrong and unfair to blame the show." Amedure's family filed an appeal over this reversal, although the Michigan Supreme Court and the Supreme Court of the United States declined to hear the case.

== Response ==
The episode and Amedure's subsequent murder resulted in a national media frenzy. The topic received heavy television coverage and many magazines and newspapers prepped major stories about it. Journalists, such Diane Sawyer of Primetime, sought interviews with Jones; however, the show's lawyers advised Jones against making any public statements due to the ongoing criminal investigation. Jones and the show's producers subsequently received hate mail and death threats. Other television shows, such as Judge Judy and The Montel Williams Show, prepared their own episodes about the situation. Jones later claimed that another talk show offered one of the show's staff members $100,000 for a copy of the episode. Riley discussed the episode on Hard Copy and A Current Affair while Palmer spoke to Genre. Media outlets such as A Current Affair and People secured interviews with audience members from the episode's taping.

On March 15, 1995, six days after the murder, Jones issued a statement on The Jenny Jones Show. She extended her sympathy to Amedure's family and emphasized "that this tragedy is about the actions of [Schmitz]." The show received heavy criticism from both Amedure and Schmitz's families. Schmitz's father, Allyn, blamed the show for his son's actions. He stated: "[T]he talk shows, they're absolutely rotten. Had [Jones] not done this, this would never have happened." Schmitz's grandfather, Walter, told a news reporter that he believed Jones acted as the "triggerman" in Amedure's murder. Amedure's brother, Frank, commented: "I feel this [murder] would not have occurred if Jenny Jones hadn't exposed homosexuality, a sensitive issue in our society." Many media commentators claimed the show ambushed Schmitz, with the Los Angeles Times's Howard Rosenberg accusing it of being an instigating factor in Amedure's murder.

Other television presenters initially refused to comment on the case; however, several eventually defended the show. Jerry Springer of the eponymous talk show stated: "To suggest we have reached a point in our society where people don't take responsibility for their own actions—that [Schmitz] could justify a murder because of a talk show—is stupid on its face." The Charles Perez Show's Charles Perez claimed the show was scapegoated by the news media, while The Morton Downey Jr. Show's Morton Downey Jr. believed the show "did nothing wrong." Phil Donahue of The Phil Donahue Show described the jury's judgment in the civil case as "chilling", stating, "It comes very close to saying that producers have a responsibility to administer a sanity test for all prospective guests." Conversely, Geraldo Rivera of Geraldo claimed that Amedure's death "was an accident waiting to happen" due to talk shows "trying to reach the lowest common denominator".

Numerous gay rights advocates cited Amedure's murder as an example of anti-gay violence. After the prosecutor in the criminal case expressed sympathy for Schmitz, outrage grew among many in the LGBTQ community. Affirmations employee Jan Petersen believed it was "unconscionable for [the prosecutor] to set up the defense to be able to use homosexual panic as a defense." Triangle Foundation executive director Jeffrey Montgomery claimed that blaming the show rather than Schmitz only fueled homophobia. Mel White, minister of justice for the Metropolitan Community Church, claimed that anti-gay rhetoric promoted by conservative Christians created a hostile social environment for the LGBTQ community, clarifying that "Jenny Jones didn't create that environment". GLAAD advised those in the LGBTQ community to not appear on talk shows unless their producers underwent sensitivity training with GLAAD officials.

== Legacy ==
The episode resulted in a national debate over shock value and tabloid television in the United States. These discussions concerned the genre's reliance on overly personal revelations, explicit sexual matters, and the use of "ambush" tactics. Dick Coveny, the executive vice president of Multimedia Entertainment, claimed that the episode's aftermath resulted in internal reviews of several similar tabloid television series, with advertisers having "a great deal more input since this situation". Some television presenters such as Maury's Maury Povich refused to alter their show's formats, but executives involved with similar shows claimed that the genre experienced a "drastic toning down" following Amedure's death. Ricki Lake claimed that her eponymous talk show developed "a whole different set of protocols" due to the incident. The episode's aftermath also resulted in many talk shows implementing psychological profiling when searching for guests.

The episode and Amedure's subsequent murder also resulted in a national discussion over violence toward gay people, particularly concerning the gay panic defense. Some media commentators claimed that Schmitz's actions were purely fueled by homophobia, with misplaced blame assigned to The Jenny Jones Show. Jones similarly believed that the murder of Amedure had "more to do with homophobia than anything else", further stating that it was "tragic that [Schmitz] would rather have been labeled a murderer than a homosexual." Conversely, some commentators contended that the murder was not motivated by homophobia, but rather it was a result of Schmitz feeling humiliated due to the "ambush" tactics used in the episode. Schmitz's use of the gay panic defense during his criminal trial drew sharp criticism from many gay rights advocates, who deemed it a "homophobic legal tactic". It is one of the most prominent examples of the legal defense, and subsequent criminal trials involving gay victims, such as Matthew Shepard, have resulted in renewed discussion of Schmitz's use of it. Some members of the American Bar Association cited the circumstances of the case as a central example as to why the gay panic defense should be banned nationwide. Despite Schmitz never being charged with a hate crime offense, multiple media outlets have retrospectively categorized the murder as such. Furthermore, The Advocate cited the circumstances of the episode and ensuing murder as one of the most prominent crimes in LGBT history.

While The Jenny Jones Show remained on air until May 2003, its reputation was marred by its association with Amedure's murder. In her memoir, Jones claimed that media outlets, such as Today and USA Today, subsequently cancelled their scheduled interviews and positive media pieces regarding the show. The show's ratings peaked shortly before Amedure's murder during its fourth season; the Amedure family's lawsuit against the show was not settled until 2002, by which time the show's ratings had dwindled by 70 percent, with its cancellation occurring shortly after. Subsequent murders involving television guests, such as Nancy Campbell-Panitz of Jerry Springer and Svetlana Orlova of Patricia's Diary, have drawn comparisons to Amedure's murder, with criticism directed at the "exploitive situations" depicted in their respective episodes. The episode was examined in the HBO documentary Talked to Death, which aired on March 25, 1997. An E! True Hollywood Story about Jones aired on February 25, 2001; it featured discussion of the episode and an interview with Schmitz's father, Allyn. On May 11, 2020, Netflix released the true crime documentary series Trial by Media. "Revealing Same Sex Secret Crush" and the subsequent murder of Amedure served as the first episode's topic. Jones, Schmitz, and producers of The Jenny Jones Show declined an invitation to participate in the series. On April 15, 2021, the HLN documentary series How It Really Happened aired a one-hour episode also dedicated to the topic, titled "The Jenny Jones Show: Fatal Attraction".
