= Tabloid talk show =

Subgenre of the talk show genre

A tabloid talk show is a subgenre of the talk show genre that emphasizes controversial and sensationalistic topical subject matter. The subgenre originated in the United States and achieved peak viewership from the mid-1980s through the end of the 1990s. Airing mostly during the day and distributed mostly through television syndication, tabloid talk shows originated in the 1960s and early 1970s with series hosted by Joe Pyne, Les Crane, and Phil Donahue; the format was popularized by personal confession-filled The Oprah Winfrey Show, which debuted nationally in 1986. The format has since been emulated outside the United States, with the United Kingdom, Latin America and the Philippines all having popular shows that fit the format.

Tabloid talk shows have sometimes been described as the "freak shows" of the late 20th century, since most of their guests were outside the mainstream. The host invites a group of guests to discuss an emotional or provocative topic and the guests are encouraged to make public confessions and resolve their problems with on-camera "group therapy". Similar shows are popular throughout Europe.

Tabloid talk shows are sometimes described using the pejorative slang term "trash TV", particularly when producers appear to design their shows to create controversy or confrontation, as in the case of The Richard Bey Show, Geraldo (such as when a 1988 show featuring Ku Klux Klan, neo-Nazis, and anti-racism and Jewish activists led to an on-camera brawl) and Jerry Springer, which focused on lurid trysts – often between family members. Vicki Abt, a professor of sociology and American studies, criticized tabloid TV shows, claiming that they had blurred the lines between normal and deviant behavior. The genre experienced a particular spike during the 1990s, when a large number of such shows were on the air, but which gradually gave way during the 2000s to a more universally appealing form of talk show. The last remaining tabloid shows in the United States were cancelled in 2026.

== History ==
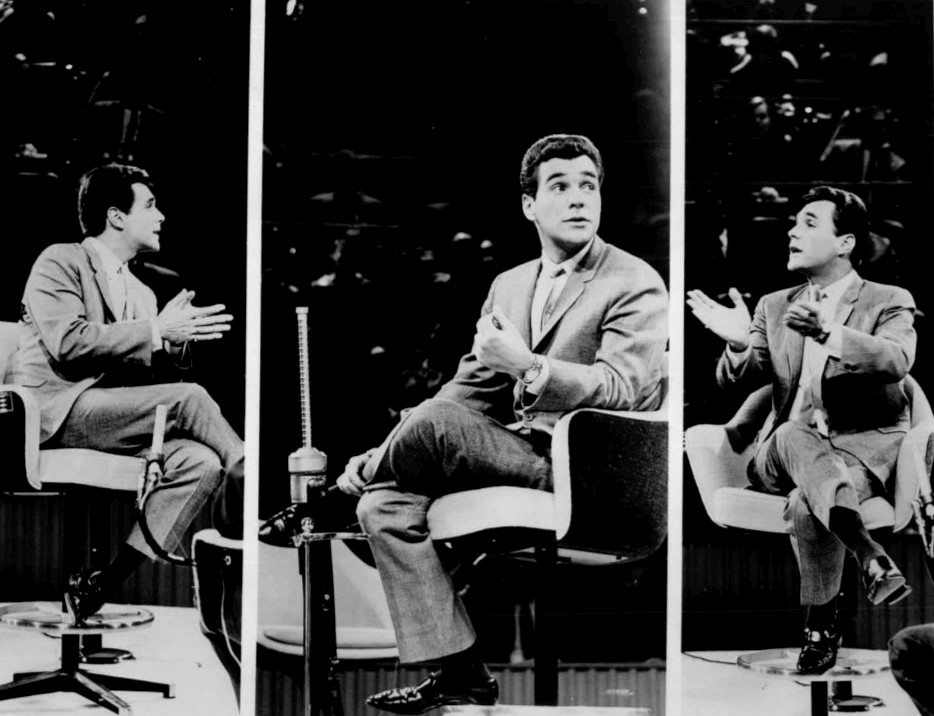
Scenes from The Les Crane Show

The Les Crane Show, a network talk show that aired on ABC as part of its late-night schedule from August 1964 to February 1965, was the first talk show to follow the format. Host Les Crane would bring on controversial guests, interview them in an aggressive but fair style, and take questions from the audience. Crane was the first to interview an openly gay man on-air and frequently interviewed black celebrities, folk singers and other taboo guests; Crane was rebuffed in his efforts to interview lesbians on one of his shows. The format was designed as competition to NBC's long-running franchise, Tonight, and its hard style contrasted with Tonight's more comedic format. The show generated significant controversy and was canceled after six months, later being retooled into a lighter talk show in an effort to boost ratings. Joe Pyne, a Los Angeles-based host, also hosted a similar talk show in syndication, although the focus was more on his confrontations with guests and less on audience participation. The early years of NBC's late-night series Tomorrow with Tom Snyder covered similar tabloid topics without a studio audience (as Tom Snyder did not believe he provided anything an audience would want to see in-person), before the show took on a more celebrity-driven format when Snyder moved to New York City in 1975. In Chicago, Lee Phillip Bell occasionally addressed controversial topics within the context of her long-running talk show as early as the late 1950s, but her show did not have a studio audience.

Tabloid talk shows often post a "cart" during an episode in order to recruit guests. According to Elizabeth Kolbert of The New York Times: "Almost all the talk shows, from Sally to Ricki Lake, post notices, known as 'carts,' in the middle of a show that ask viewers to call if they have, for example, 'been trying to tell a loved one that their spouse or lover is cheating' (The Maury Povich Show), or if they're 'going crazy' because their parents have split up (Donahue)."

=== Trash TV ===
The subgenre is sometimes described in pejorative slang as "trash TV", particularly when the show hosts appear to design their shows to create controversy or confrontation. One of the earliest of the post-Oprah shows was Geraldo, which was oriented toward controversial guests and theatricality. As an example, one of the early show topics was titled "Men in Lace Panties and the Women Who Love Them". One 1988 episode featuring white power skinheads ended in a brawl that left host Geraldo Rivera with a broken nose. This incident led to Newsweek's characterization of his show as "Trash TV". The term was subsequently applied to tabloid talk shows at their most extreme; some hosts, such as Richard Bey and Jerry Springer, have proudly accepted the label, while other hosts, such as Jenny Jones, resent it.

Richard Bey and Jerry Springer would gain reputations as the most confrontational and sexually explicit, with stories of lurid trysts – often between family members, and with stripping guests and audience members. The Richard Bey Show started this trend, and for a time, was the most graphic of the TV talk shows. For Springer, although the show started as a politically-oriented talk show, the search for higher ratings in an extremely competitive market led Springer to topics often described as tawdry and provocative, increasing its viewership in the process. Bey and Springer were different in their subject matter: Bey, which was more popular before 1996, attracted an audience similar to that of VH1, involving common themes which would be copied by The Ricki Lake Show, The Montel Williams Show, and even the more family-oriented Sally: adultery, dysfunctional families, and bad children. Bey also had booty-shaking contests and games which featured dates with an attractive woman as the prize. Both shows had numerous features on the Ku Klux Klan and racism (one of the most famous Bey episodes was "White Male Paranoia" in 1993 in which guests complained about anti-white racism), a shock rock exposé (sometimes also featuring music or appearances by artists such as Aerosmith, Mötley Crüe, Eldon Hoke and Gwar), and paternity tests. Bey was also the first to use sex hotlines, featured on bumpers for the show during commercial breaks/interstitials, first on WWOR, its original broadcaster, and then in national syndication, from 1995 on. Common topics on Springer were essentially the same, such as partners admitting their adultery to each other, with fights breaking out.

Walter Goodman wrote in a 1995 column (after the Murder of Scott Amedure):

Daytime shows like Ms. Jones's, Ricki Lake's, Richard Bey's and Jerry Springer's have caught on, making "Oprah" seem prissy, "Donahue" seem highbrow and "Geraldo" seem restrained.

Springer also featured women or men admitting to their partners that they were transvestites who had convinced their partners that they were a different sex, or revealing that they were pre- or post-op transsexuals. Morbidly obese babies and an 800-pound man who was unable to leave his house were also featured – with Springer and a contracted construction crew demolishing the man's wall to get him out. Violence and fights between guests became almost ritual, with Springer's head of security Steve Wilkos separating the combatants to prevent fights from escalating; Bey sometimes stopped fights himself. Both shows were criticized for promoting immorality and graphic language on TV. In response, Springer claimed he had no creative control over the guests.

Maury would go on to become one of the most enduring examples of the format, albeit less sensational. Debuting the same season as Springer and likewise initially having a more serious focus, host Maury Povich over time developed a largely formulaic series that carved out a niche: by the 2010s, Maury had become almost synonymous with adversarial DNA paternity testing and polygraph. A typical episode of Maury features a poor woman, often with a checkered sexual background, accusing a past sexual partner of being the father of her child, which the man will categorically deny. At the end of the segment, Povich dramatically reveals the results of the paternity test, and the affected parties react with strong emotion. By the 21st century, Maury had already earned a reputation as being "miles further down the commode" than Springer, and the name of the show would become a byword for dysfunctional parental situations. Maury would continue until Povich, at age 83, announced his retirement in 2022; the basic format continued in a follow-up show hosted by Karamo Brown for the next four years.

=== Rise and impact ===
In April 1998, Robert Lichter of a nonpartisan research group, said that there has been a "quantum leap" downward that year in terms of the public viewing vulgar language and sexuality on TV in "shocking terms". Both Jerry Springer and the adult cartoon South Park were cited as examples of TV "stretching" the "boundaries of taste". The author Ross Benes cites 1999 as "the year low culture took over the world". He has also argued, however, of "respected" cultural outputs during this period, such as The Sopranos, despite the high demand of trash TV.

=== Controversy ===
On March 6, 1995, The Jenny Jones Show taped an episode titled "Revealing Same Sex Secret Crush". One of the segments featured Scott Amedure, a 32-year-old gay man, revealing his crush on acquaintance Jonathan Schmitz, a 24-year-old straight man. Schmitz reacted with laughter while on the show, but became disturbed by the incident later. Three days after the episode's taping, Schmitz went to Amedure's home and killed him by firing two shots into his chest. Schmitz was ultimately convicted of second-degree murder and sentenced to 25 to 50 years in prison. Schmitz was released on parole on August 21, 2017.

Amedure's family filed a negligence lawsuit against the producers of The Jenny Jones Show. The show informed Schmitz that his secret admirer could be a man or woman; however, Schmitz claimed he was intentionally led to believe that they were a woman. The trial court initially found for Amedure's family and the show was ordered to pay $25 million in damages. However, this decision was later overturned by the Michigan Court of Appeals, who held that the murder was "unforeseeable" and that the show "had no duty to anticipate and prevent the act of murder committed by Schmitz three days after leaving [the] studio and hundreds of miles away". However, that decision was later overturned

=== Decline and end of the format ===
By the early 2000s, the genre began to decline in popularity with viewers, and certain hosts either saw their shows cancelled due to low ratings (such as Jenny Jones and Sally Jessy Raphaël), died (such as Wally George) or voluntarily ended their shows to pursue other interests (such as Ricki Lake). Many media analysts have attributed the decline in popularity of tabloid talk shows and daytime talk in general to competition from cable television and satellite television, and an increased number of women in the workforce (resulting in a corresponding decline in potential viewers for daytime television, a phenomenon that had also mostly killed off the tabloid talk show's predecessor in daytime lineups, the daytime game show, and would later force cutbacks in soap operas, another daytime staple, as well). Common presumptions indicated that viewers were tiring of the constant recycling of subjects that are often shown on such programs. Another explanation would be that the same audience shifted directly over to the new reality television and court show genre that rose to prominence at around the same time; most reality television and many court shows featured conflicts and raunchy material that would be normally seen in a tabloid talk show. (When Springer's show was canceled in 2018, it was replaced with a court show hosted by Springer.) As early as the late 1990s, hosts such as Oprah Winfrey, and to a lesser extent Montel Williams, began to distance their programs from the genre by refocusing them to incorporate more serious subject matter or staying on stage in the manner of more traditional talk shows. Another example of this trend was Geraldo Rivera ending his show in 1998 to focus on his CNBC talk show Rivera Live full-time. New talk shows also followed the trend of emphasizing less bawdy themes; The Ananda Lewis Show (which ran from 2001 to 2002) made a point of being an alternative to the tabloid style talk shows still airing at the time.

The Phil Donahue Show, seen by many as originating the genre, was cancelled in 1996 as it could not compete with the new crop of shows. Donahue and Rivera would attempt to re-establish their journalistic credentials on cable television: Donahue with a short-lived talk show on MSNBC, and Rivera going back to his "roving reporter" roots, filing reports on CNBC, NBC and Fox News. Maury Povich began hosting a weekend news show in 2006 with wife Connie Chung on MSNBC while still hosting his daytime show. Weekends with Maury and Connie was cancelled after six months due to low ratings, and received harsh reviews by many of the same critics who criticized his daytime talk show. Jerry Springer, while continuing to host his televised "freak show", also hosted Springer on the Radio on Air America in the mid-2000s. The syndicated Judge Hatchett dealt with many of the topics of tabloid talk shows, but was set within the framework of a court show and was more direct in its efforts to intervene in the participants' lives.

Only a handful of the shows from the tabloid talk era remained in production as of 2011, and only one new tabloid talk show premiered between 2000 and that time: The Tyra Banks Show, which ran from 2005 to 2010, was a replacement for Ricki Lake after Lake quit her show. Tyra's format was more contemporary in the style of Oprah and Dr. Phil, but employed a few stunts including having audience members appear in their underwear, and most famously, Banks once pretended to suffer the effects of rabies to a shocked reaction.

Tabloid shows made a slight comeback in the late 2000s and early 2010s, although with a greater emphasis on self-help than their predecessors (owing to the popularity of shows such as Dr. Phil). Steve Wilkos eventually left Jerry Springer and received his own syndicated talk show, The Steve Wilkos Show, which debuted in 2007. The once-defunct Tribune Entertainment ordered new pilots for tabloid-style talk shows hosted by radio shock jock Bubba the Love Sponge and conservative talk radio host Bill Cunningham, for a possible fall 2011 debut; while Bubba's show was not picked up, The Bill Cunningham Show debuted in limited syndication in September 2011 before moving to The CW (becoming the only talk show on U.S. network television not to be lifestyle- or celebrity interview-oriented) in September 2012; Cunningham continued to host the show until he decided to leave in 2016, at which point Robert Irvine took Cunningham's place. An American version of the British tabloid talk show The Jeremy Kyle Show also launched in September 2011. Ricki Lake and The Queen Latifah Show were both slated to return in September 2012, but with revamped, more mature formats (Latifah's as a more celebrity and lifestyle-focused program and Lake's focusing more on lifestyle and self-help topics) to reflect the hosts' increased age; also set to debut was a show hosted by Trisha Goddard, who hosted a tabloid show in the United Kingdom for several years. Lake's new show lasted only a year, and Queen Latifah's was delayed until September 2013 and was cancelled after two years. Goddard and Kyle also failed to gain traction with their U.S. talk show efforts, and both were canceled after two seasons.

Face the Truth, a half-hour series which debuted in the fall of 2018, attempted to cross the tabloid format with the panel show with host Vivica A. Fox. The program failed however, and was cancelled after one season.

As stalwart hosts of the format such as Povich and Springer retired from their programs in the late 2010s and early 2020s, syndicators increasingly turned to reruns of the programs to replace them. Such reruns have been relatively successful for syndicators and stations, given the lack of a need to spend time and money on new content and the low cost of residuals. NBCUniversal Syndication Studios announced in March 2026 that it had ended production of all its remaining content, including The Steve Wilkos Show and Karamo, but would continue making reruns of those shows along with Springer and Povich available to local stations.

== Influence ==
In the scholarly text Freaks Talk Back, Yale University sociology professor Joshua Gamson credits the tabloid talk show genre with providing much needed high impact media visibility for gay, bisexual, transsexual and transgender people, and doing more to make them mainstream and socially acceptable than any other development of the 20th century. In the book's editorial review Michael Bronski wrote "In the recent past, lesbians, gay men, bisexuals, and transgendered [sic] people had almost no presence on television. With the invention and propagation of tabloid talk shows such as Jerry Springer, Jenny Jones, Jane Whitney, and Geraldo, people outside the sexual mainstream now appear in living rooms across America almost every day of the week."

Gamson credits the tabloid talk show fad with making alternative sexual orientations and identities more acceptable in mainstream society. Examples include a recent Time magazine article describing early 21st century gays coming out of the closet younger and younger, and the decline of suicide rates among gays and lesbians. Gamson also believes that tabloid talk shows caused homosexuals to be embraced in more traditional media. Examples include sitcoms like Will & Grace, primetime shows like Queer Eye and feature films like the Academy Award-winning Brokeback Mountain.

While having changed with the times from her tabloid talk show roots, Winfrey continued to include gay guests by using her show and to promote openly gay personalities like her hairdresser, makeup artist, and decorator Nate Berkus, who inspired an outpouring of sympathy from middle America after grieving the loss of his partner in the 2004 Indian Ocean earthquake and tsunami on The Oprah Winfrey Show. Winfrey's "therapeutic" hosting style and the tabloid talk show genre have been both praised and blamed for leading the media counterculture of the 1980s and 1990s, which some believe broke 20th century taboos, led to America's self-help obsession and created confession culture. The Wall Street Journal coined the term "Oprahfication" to refer to the concept of public confession as a form of therapy and Time magazine named Winfrey one of the "100 Most Influential People" of the 20th century.

Sociologist Vicki Abt criticised tabloid talk shows for redefining social norms. In her book Coming After Oprah: Cultural Fallout in the Age of the TV Talk Show, Abt warned that the media revolution that followed Oprah's success was blurring the lines between normal and deviant behavior. Television critic Jeff Jarvis agreed, saying "Oprah was the one that trashed daytime TV. She took the Donahue format and then brought on the whiny misfits and losers and screamers and shouters, and then everyone, including Donahue, followed her, until it went overboard. Then finally she came back and recanted and said, no, no, now I'm the queen of quality on TV."

Talk shows were often spoofed in mainstream media, with Night Stand with Dick Dietrick being one of the full-length spoofs of the medium (complete with fake guests and audience members asking questions).

=== Oprah talks to Phil Donahue ===
In the September 2002 issue of O, The Oprah Magazine, Oprah Winfrey interviewed Phil Donahue at his Manhattan penthouse apartment in what she described as a "full-circle" moment. She wrote in the article's introduction:

If there had been no Phil Donahue show, there would be no Oprah Winfrey show. He was the first to acknowledge that women are interested in more than mascara tips and cake recipes—that we're intelligent, we're concerned about the world around us, and we want the best possible lives for ourselves.

In the interview, Donahue explained that "the show became a place where women discussed issues that didn't naturally come up, and certainly not in mixed company. Much of what we talked about on the air is what women had been talking about in ladies' rooms." Donahue recalled that he finally had to do a show about doctors who hated him because, for the first time, women were challenging their physicians. He also discussed how hosting the show helped him overcome his own taboos:

I put a gay guy on in 1968 – a real live homosexual sitting right next to me. I was terrified ... I'm from University of Notre Dame. And believe me that's the one thing you didn't want to be doing at Notre Dame was hangin' with gay people ... If you don't understand those feelings then you don't understand homophobia. There's a reason for the closet. As the years went by after that show, I got involved in gay politics, and through my activism, I began to realize what it must be like to be born, to live, and to die in the closet.

Donahue also commented on the new crop of tabloid talk shows, such as Jenny Jones – "One-Night Stand Reunions". When Winfrey reminded him "You started all this," he replied:

If that's what you think, I'm proud. What I'm most proud of is that we involved the audience more than anybody else in the game. People who owned the airwaves got to use them in this wild thing called democracy.

While both Winfrey and Donahue admitted to having done shows that were "naughty", both wondered if newer shows like Jerry Springer had crossed over into a whole different territory. Reflecting on the genre as a whole Donahue added, "If you want to know about America's culture in the last half of the 20th century, watch some of these programs."

== Europe ==
=== Greece ===
Annita Pania is the longest living representative of the tabloid talk genre in Greece, which reached its peak during the mid-1990s.

=== United Kingdom ===
American tabloid talk is widely viewed in the United Kingdom. First-run tabloid chat shows are also produced in the United Kingdom, which are largely similar to their American counterparts, albeit more tame in style. Most hosts get more involved with their guests, rather than taking an apathetic attitude in a fashion similar to Jerry Springer and usually the audience is not as involved. Jeremy Kyle, for example, was known for his confrontational attitude towards those on his programme, The Jeremy Kyle Show, while others like Trisha Goddard are more pacifist. Springer himself hosted a series on ITV as Jerry Springer. Vanessa Feltz's programme The Vanessa Show was cancelled by the BBC in 1999, as a result of the discovery that some participants were actually actors cast from a talent agency, although it was known previously for outlandish stories similar to the American shows.

== Asia ==
=== Philippines ===
Face to Face itself as the "Barangay hall on-air" of the tabloid talk genre in Philippines, which reached its peak during the early 2010s until returning in 2023.

== Examples of tabloid talk shows ==
=== Past shows ===
Past shows
Series	Start year	End year	Host	Span of run
The Ananda Lewis Show	2001	2002	Ananda Lewis	0–1 years
The Bill Cunningham Show	2011	2016	Bill Cunningham	5 years
Carnie!	1995	1996	Carnie Wilson	0.5 years
The Charles Perez Show	1994	1996	Charles Perez	1.1 years
A Closer Look with Faith Daniels	1991	1993	Faith Daniels	1–2 years
Danny	1995	1996	Danny Bonaduce	0–1 years
Dr. Phil	2002	2023	Phil McGraw	20.7 years
Face the Truth	2018	2019	Vivica A. Fox	0–1 years
Forgive or Forget	1998	2000	Mother Love (Note: most of its run)	2 years
Gabrielle	1995	1996	Gabrielle Carteris	0.8 years
Geraldo	1987	1998	Geraldo Rivera	10.7 years
The Gordon Elliott Show	1994	1997	Gordon Elliott	3 years
The Greg Behrendt Show	2006	2007	Greg Behrendt	0.5 years
In Person with Maureen O'Boyle	1996	1997	Maureen O'Boyle	0.7 years
Iyanla	2001	2002	Iyanla Vanzant	0–1 years
The Jane Pauley Show	2004	2005	Jane Pauley	0.7 years
The Jane Whitney Show	1992	1994	Jane Whitney	1–2 years
The Jenny Jones Show	1991	2003	Jenny Jones	11.7 years
The Jeremy Kyle Show	2011	2013	Jeremy Kyle	1.7 years
Jerry Springer	1991	2018	Jerry Springer	26.8 years
The Joan Rivers Show	1989	1993	Joan Rivers	4.3 years
The John Walsh Show	2002	2004	John Walsh	1–2 years
Dr. Joy Browne	1999	2000	Joy Browne	0–1 years
Karamo	2022	2026	Karamo Brown	4 years
Katie	2012	2014	Katie Couric	1.9 years
The Dr. Keith Ablow Show	2006	2007	Keith Ablow	0–1 years
The Larry Elder Show	2004	2005	Larry Elder	0–1 years
Dr. Laura	2000	2001	Laura Schlesinger	0–1 years
Leeza	1994	2000	Leeza Gibbons	6.2 years
The Mark Walberg Show	1995	1996	Mark L. Walberg	0.7 years
The Marsha Warfield Show	1990	1991	Marsha Warfield	0.8 years
Maury	1991	2022	Maury Povich	31 years
The Meredith Vieira Show	2014	2016	Meredith Vieira	1.7 years
The Montel Williams Show (Note: Montel Williams dropped the tabloid format by 2006)	1991	2008	Montel Williams	16.9 years
The Morton Downey Jr. Show	1988	1989	Morton Downey Jr.	0.9 years
The Oprah Winfrey Show (Note: Oprah Winfrey dropped the tabloid format by 2009)	1986	2011	Oprah Winfrey	24.7 years
The Phil Donahue Show	1970	1996	Phil Donahue	25.9 years
The Queen Latifah Show	1999	2001	Queen Latifah	1.9 years
The Queen Latifah Show	2013	2015	Queen Latifah	1.5 years
The Richard Bey Show	1995	1996	Richard Bey	2 years
Ricki Lake	1993	2004	Ricki Lake	10.7 years
The Ricki Lake Show	2012	2013	Ricki Lake	0.8 years
The Robert Irvine Show	2016	2018	Robert Irvine	1.7 years
The Rob Nelson Show	2002	2003	Rob Nelson	0.3 years
Rolonda	1994	1997	Rolonda Watts	3.3 years
Sally	1983	2002	Sally Jessy Raphael	18.6 years
The Shirley Show	1989	1995	Shirley Solomon	5–6 years
Steve Harvey	2012	2017	Steve Harvey	4.9 years
The Steve Wilkos Show	2007	2026	Steve Wilkos	19 years
Talk or Walk	2001	2002	Myreah Moore	0–1 years
Talk or Walk	2001	2002	Steve Turner	0–1 years
Talk or Walk	2001	2002	Liliya Czarina	0–1 years
The T.D. Jakes Show	2016	2017	T.D. Jakes	0–1 years
The Tempestt Bledsoe Show	1995	1996	Tempestt Bledsoe	0.7 years
The Test	2013	2014	Kirk Fox	0.6 years
Trisha	2012	2014	Trisha Goddard	1.7 years
The Tyra Banks Show	2005	2010	Tyra Banks	4.7 years

== See also ==
- Quality television
- Reality television
- Tabloid television
- Trial by Media
