= The Sharon Osbourne Show =

American television talk show

- Genre: Talk show
- Directed by: Neil Flagg; Brian Campbell
- Presented by: Sharon Osbourne
- Country of origin: United States
- Original language: English
- No. of seasons: 1

Production
- Executive producers: Mary Duffy; Sharon Osbourne; Corin Nelson
- Production location: Tribune Studios
- Running time: 42–43 minutes
- Production companies: SO Divine Productions; Telepictures Productions

Original release
- Network: Syndication
- Release: September 15, 2003 – May 21, 2004

The Sharon Osbourne Show (Note: The show is sometimes referred to as Sharon.) is an American daytime talk show that was hosted by Sharon Osbourne. The show ran in syndication for one season from September 15, 2003 to May 21, 2004. Taped at Tribune Studios, the show primarily featured celebrity interviews and slice-of-life segments.

The show was produced by SO Divine Productions in association with Telepictures Productions, and it was distributed by Warner Bros. Domestic Television Distribution. It was conceived as an advertiser-friendly show meant to attract a younger audience. Telepictures Productions offered Osbourne a talk show following the success of her family's reality television series The Osbournes. The show premiered to modest ratings; however, its viewership steadily declined over the course of its one season. It received a negative reception from television critics, with criticism directed at Osbourne's hosting abilities. It was nominated for a GLAAD Media Award and a Prism Award. In 2006, Osbourne hosted a talk show for ITV1 under the same title.

== Format ==
The Sharon Osbourne Show is an hour-long daytime talk show that was hosted by television personality Sharon Osbourne. Set in front of a studio audience, the show's stage was built to resemble Osbourne's Beverly Hills mansion. The multi-topic show primarily featured interviews with celebrities and everyday people. Osbourne would sometimes conduct follow-up interviews with guests at their own homes. A segment titled "Under the Covers" featured interviews with male celebrities that were conducted while on a bed on-stage. In addition to interviews, the show featured slice-of-life segments, music, and reports on current pop culture events. In December 2003, the show featured a series of guest hosts—including Jack Osbourne, Lance Bass, and Dan Cortese—after Osbourne took a leave of absence to attend to her husband, Ozzy Osbourne, who was injured in an ATV accident.

== Production ==
In 2002, Osbourne starred in the reality television series The Osbournes, which documented the domestic life of her husband, Ozzy Osbourne. The series introduced Osbourne to a wider audience and she credited its success as the reason she was offered her own talk show. In November 2002, Osbourne signed a deal with Telepictures Productions to host a talk show set to debut in the fall of 2003. According to Jim Paratore, president of Telepictures Productions, the production company chose to work with Osbourne as it believed that audiences would find her interesting. Paratore further stated that the goal of the show "was to attract a younger audience with an advertiser friendly show, that was good for the overall image of the [television] stations". Osbourne cited Oprah Winfrey, Barbara Walters, and Rosie O'Donnell as inspirations; however, she opined that she was "not very well-read" and "a layman" in comparison.

The show was produced by SO Divine Productions in association with Telepictures Productions. It recruited producers of The Jenny Jones Show, including executive producer Kerrie Moriarity, and repurposed some of its materials. Despite this, Osbourne expressed her disdain for tabloid talk shows, stating: "I detest Jerry Springer. I detest Sally Jessy’s and Jenny Jones’s shows. They’re demeaning to people, just degrading and humiliating." Mary Duffy, a former staffer for Sally, was initially reported as the show's executive producer; however, she was replaced by Corin Nelson before the show premiered. Difficulties with the show's production became a popular topic in the media, with Paratore acknowledging that it was challenging to find producers that connected with Osbourne. Osbourne believed that she was relatable to many women viewers and she hoped that audiences would "connect with her working-class sensibility".

== Broadcast history ==
The Sharon Osbourne Show was placed in first-run syndication in the United States, in which it was distributed by Warner Bros. Domestic Television Distribution. The show premiered on September 15, 2003, in which it was cleared in over 90 percent of the country. It served as a replacement to The Jenny Jones Show. In many television markets, specifically those under The WB 100+ Station Group, the show was broadcast as part of a programming block with Ricki Lake and The Ellen DeGeneres Show.

In January 2004, at the National Association of Television Program Executives conference, Tribune Broadcasting indicated that it was looking for replacements for the show. The show was formally canceled shortly after on January 30, 2004, in which its low ratings were cited. Its final episode was broadcast in May 2004. Osbourne expressed disappointment over its cancelation; however, she indicated her willingness to host another talk show. Two years later, Osbourne hosted a daytime talk show on ITV1 under the same title.

In July 2025, a resurfaced interview from the show circulated online, in which guest host Anthony Anderson asked Lindsay Lohan about her dating habits.

== Reception ==
=== Television viewership and ratings ===
The show premiered with a 1.8/5 rating share, which was a 29 percent increase from the time period average the previous year. The show maintained a 1.5 household rating for its first two weeks, in which it beat out contemporaries like The Ellen DeGeneres Show. However, the show's viewership then began to decline in which it averaged a 1.4 rating in October and a 1.3 rating in December.

The show overall averaged a 1.2 rating, which made it the second most viewed show among all new first-run syndicated talk shows.

=== Critical response ===
The show received a negative reception from television critics. Ray Richmond of Today described its premiere as close to a "full-on train wreck"; he claimed that Osbourne "tends to swallow her words and isn’t a natural talker by any stretch". The New York Times's Virginia Heffernan similarly criticized Osbourne's hosting, stating that she often "let her speech lapse into thoughtless redundancy". Mark Sachs of the Los Angeles Times described some of Osbourne's celebrity interviews as "almost unwatchable"; however, he saw potential in her coverage of heavier topics. USA Today's Robert Bianco described the show as a "soon-to-be-discarded cultural oddity", further stating that "the only reasons to watch Sharon are if you are insatiably drawn to failure or if you have some medical need to have your nerves jangled." The Globe and Mail listed it as one of 2003's worst television programs and Fox News labeled it as one of the worst talk shows in television history.

=== Awards and nominations ===
Awards and nominations
Award	Year (Note: Indicates the year of ceremony)	Category	Nominee(s)	Result	Ref.
GLAAD Media Awards	2004	Talk Show	"Alyn Libman"	Nominated	
Prism Awards	2004	TV Talk Show Series Episode	"Episode #1014"	Nominated	
