= Murder Live! =

Film directed by Roger Spottiswoode

- DVD cover
- Written by: Chris Bertolet
- Directed by: Roger Spottiswoode
- Starring: Marg Helgenberger; David Morse; Teri Garr; Peter Horton
- Music by: Gary Chang
- Country of origin: United States
- Original language: English

Production
- Producers: Randy Sutter; Karen Moore
- Cinematography: Jeffrey Jur
- Editor: Dominique Fortin
- Running time: 96 minutes
- Production companies: Von Zerneck/Sertner Films; NBC Studios

Original release
- Network: NBC
- Release: March 9, 1997

Murder Live! is a 1997 American television film written by Chris Bertolet and directed by Roger Spottiswoode. Marg Helgenberger stars as Pia Postman, a television presenter who hosts a self-titled tabloid talk show. David Morse stars as Frank McGrath, a man who holds Postman hostage after his daughter suffered embarrassment due to a prior guest appearance on the show.

== Plot ==
Pia Postman (Helgenberger) hosts a self-titled tabloid talk show, a program grieving father Frank McGrath (Morse) takes offense to after his daughter commits suicide as a direct result of being humiliated on the show. He then disguises himself as a member of the audience during a live episode of the show, and takes Postman hostage wearing a bomb jacket, threatening to kill himself, Postman, and the audience if the police intervene.

== Cast ==
- Marg Helgenberger as Pia Postman
- David Morse as Frank McGrath
- Teri Garr as JoAnn McGrath
- Peter Horton as Lt. Clay Maloney
- Christine Estabrook as Dr. Christine Winter
- Lauren Tom as Marge Fong
- Neal McDonough as Hank Wilson
- Eloy Casados as Tony Grenaldi
- John O'Hurley as Hal Damon

== Production ==
The film was inspired by the murder of Scott Amedure, a guest who was killed three days after he appeared on an episode of The Jenny Jones Show.

== Critical reception ==
Ray Richmond of Variety believed the film was "a roundly entertaining, smartly constructed piece of filmmaking", although he also claimed it was "over-the-top for its own good". Tom Shales of The Washington Post criticized the film as "preachy and ponderous". Howard Rosenberg of the Los Angeles Times claimed the film was just as exploitative as the tabloid talk shows it intended to criticize. John J. O'Connor of The New York Times believed the film had a strong message against the tabloid talk show genre, and he praised Marg Helgenberger's leading performance.
