= 1995 in LGBTQ rights =

This is a list of notable events in the history of LGBT rights that took place in the year 1995.

== Events ==
- A new penal code is introduced in Portugal, which lowers the age of consent for heterosexual acts to 14; however it retains an age of consent of 16 for homosexual acts.
- Sweden legalizes registered partnerships, with all of the rights of marriage—except for marriage in a church and adoption.
- US state of Rhode Island bans sexual orientation discrimination in the private sector.

=== January ===
- 1 – Sweden begins registering same-sex domestic partners. Same-sex couples receive most of the rights of mixed-sex marriages but do not receive the right to a church wedding, the right to adopt children or the right to artificial insemination.
- 19 – The District of Columbia Court of Appeals rules in Dean v. District of Columbia that the district's human rights ordinance barring discrimination based on sexual orientation does not guarantee a right to same-sex marriage.

=== February ===
- 2 – A judge in Tennessee rules that the state's sodomy law violates the state constitution.
- 17 – The Canadian province of British Columbia announces new regulations allowing gay and lesbian people to adopt children.

=== March ===
- 9 – Scott Amedure, a gay man, is shot to death by Jonathan Schmitz, a heterosexual man, after Amedure revealed a secret crush on Schmitz during an episode of The Jenny Jones Show titled "Revealing Same Sex Secret Crush". Schmitz is later convicted of second-degree murder with a sentence of 30 to 50 years.
- 30 – In Abel v. United States of America, the first challenge to "don't ask, don't tell", district judge Eugene Nickerson rules that the provision of the 1993 law barring LGBT military personnel from saying they are LGBT infringes on their First Amendment and Fifth Amendment rights.

=== May ===
- 17 – Hillsborough County, Florida commissioners repeal the county's gay rights law.
- 25 – In Egan v. Canada the Supreme Court of Canada rules that sexual orientation is a prohibited ground of discrimination under section 15 of the Canadian Charter of Rights and Freedoms, a part of the constitution. Section 15 does not explicitly list sexual orientation, but is designed to permit the addition of new grounds by the courts. The ruling will have a wide impact since section 15 applies to all laws, including human rights laws that prohibit discrimination by all employers, landlords, service providers and governments.

=== June ===
- 13 – The Broward County Commission passes a gay rights bill covering employment, housing and public accommodation.
- 19 – In Hurley v. Irish-American Gay, Lesbian, and Bisexual Group of Boston the United States Supreme Court rules that private citizens organizing a public demonstration may legally exclude groups who impart a message that the private citizen does not wish to promote. The ruling allows the organizers of the city's annual St. Patrick's Day parade to exclude LGBT contingents.
- 24 – Inauguration of the Memorial to gay and lesbian victims of National Socialism in Cologne, Germany

=== August ===
- 2 – U.S. President Bill Clinton signs Executive Order 12968, which bans discrimination based on "sexual orientation" as it establishes uniform policies for allowing government employees access to classified information.

=== October ===
- 10 – The United States Supreme Court hears oral arguments in Romer v. Evans, the case that would eventually overturn Colorado's Amendment 2, which banned gay rights laws in the state.

=== December ===
- 30 – San Francisco outlaws discrimination based on gender identity.

== Deaths ==
- March 9 – Scott Amedure, 32, talk show murder victim
- November 17 – James Woods III, 32, author of The Corporate Closet: The Professional Lives of Gay Men in America
- November 20 – Steven Powsner, 40, former president of the New York City Lesbian and Gay Community Services Center
