= Gay and trans panic defense =

Controversial legal defense

The gay panic defense or homosexual advance defense is a strategy of legal defense, where a heterosexual individual charged with a violent crime against a same-sex attracted individual claims they lost control and reacted violently because of an unwanted sexual advance that was made upon them. A defendant will use available legal defenses against assault and murder, with the aim of seeking an acquittal, a mitigated sentence, or a conviction of a lesser offense. A defendant may allege to have found the same-sex sexual advances so offensive or frightening that they were provoked into reacting, were acting in self-defense, were of diminished capacity, or were temporarily insane, and that this circumstance is exculpatory or mitigating.

The trans panic defense is a closely related legal strategy applied in cases of assault or murder of a transgender individual whom the assailant(s) had engaged with, or were close to engaging with, in sexual relations, and claim(s) to have been unaware that the victim was transgender, producing in the attacker an alleged trans panic reaction. In most cases, the violence or murder is perpetrated by a heterosexual cisgender man against a heterosexual trans woman.

Broadly, the defenses may be called the "gay and trans panic defense" or the "LGBTQ+ panic defense".

== History ==
The gay panic defense grew out of a combination of legal defenses from the mid-nineteenth century and a mental disorder described in the early twentieth, seeking to apply the legal framework of the temporary insanity defense, provocation defense, or self-defense, often by using the mental condition of "homosexual panic disorder".

=== Homosexual panic disorder ===
Homosexual panic seen as a mental health disorder is distinct from the homosexual panic defense within the legal system. Whereas homosexual panic disorder was at one point considered a diagnosable medical condition, the legal defense implies only a temporary loss of self-control.

Edward J. Kempf, a psychiatrist, coined the term "homosexual panic" in 1920. He identified it as a condition of "panic due to the pressure of uncontrollable perverse sexual cravings," and classified it as an acute pernicious dissociative disorder, meaning that it involved a disruption in typical perception and memory functions. Kempf identified the condition during and after World War I at St. Elizabeths Hospital in Washington, D.C.

The disorder was briefly included in DSM-1 as a supplementary term in Appendix C but did not appear in any subsequent editions of DSM and thus is not considered a diagnosable condition by the American Psychiatric Association.

Unlike the legal defense created later and named after it, the onset of the condition was not attributed to unwanted homosexual advances. Rather, Kempf stated that it was caused by the individual's own "aroused homosexual cravings".

=== Types of defenses ===
The gay panic defense strategy usually falls into three categories of defenses: the provocation defense, self defense (including imperfect self defense) and insanity based defenses (including temporary insanity, irresistible impulse, and diminished responsibility). The gay panic defense is not a stand-alone defense, but rather a legal tactic used by the defense which seeks to obtain an acquittal, a mitigated sentence, or a conviction of a lesser offense.

The defense is commonly defined by the attempt to shift the blame onto the victim's sexual orientation or gender identity of the victim as a form of victim blaming.

== Jurisdictions ==
=== Australia ===
In Australia, it is known as the "homosexual advance defence" (HAD). Of its status in Australia, Kent Blore wrote in 2012:

Although the homosexual advance defence cannot be found anywhere in legislation, its entrenchment in case law gives it the force of law. ... Several Australian states and territories have either abolished the umbrella defence of provocation entirely or excluded non-violent homosexual advances from its ambit. Of those that have abolished provocation entirely, Tasmania was the first to do so in 2003.

In Australia, all Australian states have abolished the provocation defence altogether (Tasmania in 2003, Victoria in 2005, Western Australia in 2008 and South Australia in 2020) or restricted its application. Queensland restricted the defence of provocation in 2011, and further restricted it in 2017 (with an exception for 'exceptional circumstances' as determined by a magistrate). In a differing approach, New South Wales, the ACT and Northern Territory implemented changes to stipulate that non-violent sexual advances (of any kind, including homosexual) are not a valid defence. In New South Wales, the law on provocation was amended to provide that the provocative conduct of the deceased must also have constituted a serious indictable offense.

Garry Wait, a 20-year-old waiter, mounted an unsuccessful gay panic defence after being charged with the murder of 63-year-old former federal MP Bill Arthur in 1982. Wait pleaded not guilty to murder but guilty to manslaughter, on the grounds that Arthur had made "homosexual advances." The jury rejected his account of the killing, convicting him of murder. He was sentenced to life imprisonment.

South Australia was the first Australian jurisdiction to legalize homosexual acts in 1975; however, it was the last Australian jurisdiction to repeal or overhaule the gay panic defense. In 2015, the South Australian state government was awaiting the report from the South Australian Law Reform Institute and the outcome of the appeal to the High Court from the Court of Criminal Appeal of South Australia. In 2011, Michael Lindsay killed Andrew Negre. Lindsay's principal defense was that while he violently attacked Negre, the death resulted from another attacker. The secondary defense was that Lindsay stabbed Negre because he lost self-control after Negre made sexual advances to him and offered to pay him for sex. Lindsay was convicted of murder and sentenced to life imprisonment with a 23-year non-parole period. The Court of Criminal Appeal upheld the conviction, finding that the jury directions on the gay panic defense were flawed, but that every reasonable jury would have found that an ordinary person would not have lost self-control and acted as Lindsay did. The High Court held that a properly instructed jury might have found that an offer of money for sex made by a Caucasian man to an Aboriginal man in the latter's home and in the presence of his wife and family may have had a pungency that an unwelcome sexual advance made by one man toward another in other circumstances would not have. Lindsay was re-tried and was again convicted of murder. The Court of Criminal Appeal upheld the conviction, and an application for special leave to appeal to the High Court was dismissed. In April 2017, the South Australian Law Reform Institute recommended that the law of provocation be reformed to remove discrimination on the basis of sexual orientation and/or gender, but that the removal of a non-violent sexual advance as a partial defence to murder be deferred until stage 2 of the report was produced. Finally, in 2020, South Australia abolished the defense of provocation altogether.

=== New Zealand ===
In 2003, gay interior designer and former television host David McNee was killed by part-time sex worker Phillip Layton Edwards. Edwards said at his trial that he told McNee he was not gay, but would masturbate in front of him on a "no-touch" basis for money. The defense successfully argued that Edwards, who had 56 previous convictions and had been on parole for 11 days, was provoked into beating McNee after he violated their "no touching" agreement. Edwards was jailed for nine years for manslaughter.

In July 2009, Ferdinand Ambach, 32, a Hungarian tourist, was convicted of killing Ronald Brown, 69, by hitting him with a banjo and shoving the instrument's neck down Brown's throat. Ambach was initially charged with murder, but the charge was downgraded to manslaughter after Ambach's lawyer successfully invoked the gay panic defense.

On November 26, 2009, the New Zealand Parliament voted to abolish Section 169 of the Crimes Act 1961, removing the provocation defense from New Zealand law, although some argued this change was more a result of the failed provocation defense in the Sophie Elliott murder trial by her ex-boyfriend.

=== Philippines ===
Lance Cpl. Joseph Scott Pemberton, a U.S. Marine from Massachusetts, was convicted of homicide (but not of murder) in the killing of Jennifer Laude in a motel room in Olongapo in the Philippines in 2014. Police said that Pemberton became enraged after discovering that Laude was transgender. After Pemberton served six years of a ten-year sentence, President Rodrigo Duterte gave him an absolute pardon. Sen. Imee Marcos said the pardon would help the Philippines maintain "very deep and very cordial" relations with the US.

=== United Kingdom ===
Guidance given to counsel by the Crown Prosecution Service of England and Wales states: "The fact that the victim made a sexual advance on the defendant does not, of itself, automatically provide the defendant with a defence of self-defence for the actions that they then take." In the UK, it has been known for decades as the "Portsmouth defence" or the "guardsman's defence". The latter term was used in a 1980 episode of Rumpole of the Bailey.

=== United States ===
==== Federal laws ====
In 2018, Senator Ed Markey (D-MA) and Representative Joe Kennedy III (D-MA) introduced S.3188 and H.R.6358, respectively, which would ban the gay and trans panic defense at the national level. Both bills died in committee.

In June 2019, the bill was reintroduced in both houses of Congress as the Gay and Trans Panic Defense Prohibition Act of 2019 (S.1721 and H.R.3133). The bills would prohibit a federal criminal defendant from asserting, as a defense, that the nonviolent sexual advance of an individual or a perception or belief of the gender, gender identity, or expression, or sexual orientation of an individual excuses or justifies conduct or mitigates the severity of an offense. Similarly to S.3188, after being sent to committee, the bill died at the end of 2020, and was re-introduced (as S.1137) in April 2021. It was reintroduced in June 2023 and 2025.

==== State laws ====
States that have bans (blue) on the gay and trans panic defense, as of 2024

In 2006, the California State Legislature amended the Penal Code to include jury instructions to ignore bias, sympathy, prejudice, or public opinion in making their decision, and a directive was made to educate district attorneys' offices about panic strategies and how to prevent bias from affecting trial outcomes. The American Bar Association (ABA) unanimously passed a resolution in 2013 urging governments to follow California's lead in prescribing explicit juror instructions to ignore bias and to educate prosecutors about panic defenses.

Following the ABA's resolution in 2013, the LGBT Bar has continued to work with concerned lawmakers at both the state and community levels to help ban the use of this tactic in courtrooms across the country.

Bans and consideration of bans for gay and trans panic defense
State	Considered	Banned	Bill	Ref
California	—	2006	AB2501	
Illinois	—	2017	SB1761	
Rhode Island	—	2018	H7066aa/S3014	
Connecticut	—	2019	SB-0058	
Hawaii	—	2019	HB711	
Maine	—	2019	LD1632	
Nevada	—	2019	SB97	
New York	2014	—	S7048	
New York	2015	—	A5467/S499	
New York	2017	—	A5001/S50	
New York	—	2019	A2707/S3293	
New Jersey	2015	—	A4083	
New Jersey	2016	—	A429	
New Jersey	2018	2020	A1796/S2609	
Washington, D.C.	2017	—	B22-0102	
Washington, D.C.	—	2020	B23-0409	
Georgia	2018	—	HB931	
Wisconsin	2019	—	AB436	
Washington	2019	2020	HB1687	
Pennsylvania	2020	—	HB2333	
Colorado	—	2020	SB20-221	
Texas	2020	—	HB73	
Virginia	—	2021	HB2132	
Maryland	—	2021	HB231	
Oregon	—	2021	HB3020/SB704	
Vermont	—	2021	HB128	
Florida	2021	—	SB718	
Iowa	2021	—	HF310	
New Mexico	2021	2022	SB213	
Minnesota	2021	—	SF360	
Minnesota	—	2024	HB5216	
Massachusetts	2021	—	HD2275/SD1183	
Nebraska	2021	—	LB321	
Arkansas	2022	—	LB321	
North Carolina	2022	—	LB321	
New Hampshire	2021	—	HB238	
New Hampshire	—	2023	HB315	
Delaware		2023	HB142	
Michigan		2024	HB4718	

On September 27, 2014, Governor Jerry Brown signed Assembly Bill No. 2501, making California the first state in the US to ban the gay and trans panic defense. AB 2501 states that discovery of, knowledge about, or potential disclosure of the victim's actual or perceived gender, gender identity, gender expression, or sexual orientation does not, by itself, constitute sufficient provocation to justify a lesser charge of voluntary manslaughter.

In August 2017, Bruce Rauner, Governor of Illinois, signed SB1761, banning the gay and trans panic defenses in that state.

In June 2018, H7066aa and S3014, bills to prohibit the gay and trans panic defense passed the Rhode Island Assembly with overwhelming margins: The House voted 68–2 and the Senate voice voted 27–0. The Governor of Rhode Island signed the bill into law a month later in July 2018. The law went into effect immediately.

In 2019, the New York State Legislature once again considered banning the gay panic defense. For the 2019–2020 session, the bills considered were S3293 and A2707; prior versions of the bill have died in committee (S7048, 2013–14 session; A5467/S499, 2015–16 session; A5001/S50, 2017–18 session). On June 30, 2019, the day of the NYC Pride March, Governor Andrew Cuomo signed the ban into law, effective immediately.

In April 2019, both houses of the Hawaii State Legislature passed bills to prohibit the gay and trans panic defense (HB711 and SB2). A conference committee was set up to reconcile the two versions of the bill; the reconciled bill passed both houses on April 26, 2019, and was signed into law two months later, on June 26, 2019, by the Governor David Ige. It went into effect immediately.

In May 2019, the Nevada Legislature passed SB97 to prohibit the gay and trans panic defense used within Nevada state courts and tribunals. On May 14, 2019, Governor Steve Sisolak signed SB97 into law. The law went into effect on October 1, 2019.

In June 2019, the Connecticut General Assembly passed SB-0058 unanimously to prohibit the trans and gay panic defense. The bill was signed into law by Governor Ned Lamont. The law went into effect on October 1, 2019, as per the rules governed under the Constitution of Connecticut.

Also in June 2019, the Maine Legislature passed a bill (House vote 132–1 and Senate vote 35–0), which was signed by Governor Janet Mills on June 21, 2019, to ban the "gay and trans panic defense" effective immediately.

New Jersey passed a bill without a single vote in opposition to ban the gay and trans panic defense; it was signed into law in January 2020.

In February 2020, the Washington State Legislature passed a bill (House vote 90–5 with 3 excused and Senate vote 46–3) to abolish the gay panic defense. The bill was signed into law in March 2020, by the Governor of Washington State Jay Inslee. Washington state became the tenth US state to ban the gay panic defense when the law went into effect in June 2020.

In July 2020, Colorado became the 11th US state to abolish the gay panic defense. The final vote was 63–1–1 in the House and 35–0 in the Senate.

In December 2020, the Council of the District of Columbia unanimously voted on a bill to ban the use of the "gay and trans panic defense". Mayor Muriel Bowser said she would sign the measure. The bill will then go to Capitol Hill for a 30 legislative day review by Congress, required by the District of Columbia Home Rule Act.

As of January 2021, similar bills have been introduced in several other states.

In 2023, New Hampshire enacted HB 315, sponsored by Rep. Shaun Filiault. The state officially became the first Republican-controlled state to abolish the gay and trans panic defense, and went into effect on midnight January 1, 2024.

Effective from August 1, 2024, Minnesota implemented a law explicitly banning the gay and trans panic defense within an omnibus justice bill passed and signed into law in May 2024.

The Michigan legislature passed a ban on the use of the gay and trans panic defense on June 27, 2024. The bill was signed into law by Governor Gretchen Whitmer on July 23, 2024.

==== Use of the gay panic defense ====
The gay panic defense is invoked as an affirmative defense, but only to strengthen a more "traditional criminal law defense such as insanity, diminished capacity, provocation, or self-defense" and is not meant to provide justification of the crime on its own. While using the gay panic defense to explain insanity has typically not been successful in winning a complete acquittal, diminished capacity, provocation, and self-defense have all been used successfully to reduce charges and sentences.

Historically, in US courts, use of the gay panic defense has not typically resulted in the acquittal of the defendant; instead, the defendant was usually found guilty, but on lesser charges, or judges and juries may have cited homosexual solicitation as a mitigating factor, resulting in reduced culpability and sentences.

In 1995, the tabloid talk show The Jenny Jones Show filmed an episode titled "Revealing Same Sex Secret Crush". Scott Amedure, a 32-year-old gay man, publicly revealed on the program that he was a secret admirer of Jonathan Schmitz, a 24-year old straight man. Three days after the episode was filmed, Schmitz confronted and killed Amedure. Schmitz was tried for the first-degree murder of Scott Amedure; however, he was convicted on the lesser offense of second-degree murder after asserting the gay panic defense.

==== Uses of the trans panic defense ====
- In the 1997 murder of Chanelle Pickett, William C. Palmer claimed that he attacked Pickett after discovering she "was actually a man." However, when the victim's sister and other witnesses revealed that Palmer knew of Pickett's trans status, Palmer abandoned this defense.
- A trans panic defense was used in 2004–2005 in California by the three defendants in the Gwen Araujo homicide case, who claimed they were enraged by the discovery that Araujo, a transgender teenager with whom they had engaged in sex, had a penis. Following their initial suspicions about her birth-assigned sex, Araujo was "subjected to forced genital exposure in the bathroom, after which it was announced that she was 'really a man'". The defendants claimed that Araujo's failure to disclose her birth-assigned sex and anatomy was tantamount to deception, and that the subsequent revelation of her birth-assigned sex "had provoked the violent response to what Thorman represented as a sexual violation 'so deep it's almost primal'". The first trial resulted in a hung jury; in the second, defendants Mike Magidson and Jose Merél were convicted of second-degree murder, while the jury again deadlocked in the case of Jason Cazares. Cazares later plead no contest to charges of voluntary manslaughter. The jury did not return the requested hate crime additions to the convictions for the defendants.
- Angie Zapata was beaten to death by Allen Andrade in July 2008. After Andrade learned Zapata had a penis, she smiled at him and said "I'm all woman"; his defense attorney stated the smile "was a highly provoking act, and it would cause someone to have an aggressive reaction" when arguing to have the charge against him dropped to second-degree murder. Judge Marcelo Kopcow rejected that argument, and Andrade was sentenced to a mandatory sentence of life in prison without the possibility of parole after he was convicted by a jury of first-degree murder in 2009 after two hours of deliberation. The conviction included a hate crime endorsement, believed to be the first instance of a hate crime application when the victim was transgender.
- Islan Nettles was beaten to death in Harlem just after midnight on August 17, 2013. The killer, James Dixon, was not indicted until March 2015, despite turning himself in three days after the attack and confessing that he flew into "a blind fury" when he realized Nettles was a transgender woman. Dixon pleaded not guilty to first-degree manslaughter at his indictment. Dixon was not charged with murder, which would have required proof of intent, nor with a hate crime. During his confession, Dixon said his friends mocked him for flirting with Nettles, not realizing that she was transgender. Furthermore, in an incident a few days before the beating, his friends teased him after he flirted with two transgender women while doing pull-ups on scaffolding at 138th Street and Eighth Avenue. Dixon pleaded guilty and received a sentence of 12 years' imprisonment, which Nettles' mother felt was too lenient.

== See also ==
- Crime of passion – Violent crime triggered by a sudden impulse
- Homohysteria
- Transgender discrimination
- Transgender Day of Remembrance, a day to memorialize those who have been killed by transphobia
