= Look Good, Feel Great Cookbook =

Cookbook by Jenny Jones

- Author: Jenny Jones
- Cover artist: Charles Bush
- Language: English
- Subject: Superfood
- Genre: Cookbook
- Publisher: Wiley
- Publication date: April 10, 2006
- Publication place: United States
- Media type: Hardback
- Pages: 212
- ISBN: 978-0-7645-9958-3
- LC Class: 2005009404
- Preceded by: Jenny Jones: My Story

Look Good, Feel Great Cookbook is a cookbook with over eighty recipes devoted to superfood and comfort food dishes. The book was written and photographed by Jenny Jones. Broken down into twelve sections, the book includes recipes for homemade dishes, including Jones's "favorite breakfasts", muffins and quick bread, soups, salads, dips and snacks, light meals, "super suppers", pasta and grains, vegetable sides, cookies, cakes, and desserts. Look Good, Feel Great Cookbook was published on April 10, 2006, by Wiley and it was met with favorable reviews for its healthy yet accessible recipes. All of the book's proceeds were donated to the City of Hope Cancer Center to benefit breast cancer research.

== Background ==
From 1991 to 2003, Jenny Jones served as the host of the syndicated talk show The Jenny Jones Show. Following the show's cancelation, Jones devoted the next two years to researching, writing, and photographing material for a cookbook. Jones had initially thought of writing a cookbook in 1992, with a focus on muffin recipes. Jones conceived the book as a resource for consumers to prepare healthy, appealing food in an accessible manner. According to Jones, "My goal is to motivate more people to cook at home and make healthy eating a priority". All proceeds from the book were donated to the City of Hope Cancer Center to benefit breast cancer research.

On October 22, 2014, Jones released the book on her website for free digital download.

== Contents ==
Look Good, Feel Great Cookbook contains over eighty recipes from Jones; each recipe includes advice from Jones on how to prepare the dish in addition to discussion of its health benefits. The recipes are grouped into twelve sections. The first section, "My Favorite Breakfasts", includes eight of Jones's favorite breakfast recipes. The book also includes sections dedicated to light meals ("Thirty-Minute Meals") and dinner ("Super Suppers"), which offer seven and six recipes, respectively. "Muffins and Quick Breads" and "Dips and Snacks" both offer eight recipes, such as pumpkin chocolate chip muffins and tomato salsa. The book includes nine salad and salad dressing recipes ("Salads for Sure") in addition to eight soup recipes ("Soups for the Soul"). "Pasta, Rice, and Grains" includes five recipes while "Vegetable Sides" has seven. "Cookies That Count" and "Clear Conscience Cakes" both offer seven recipes, such as peanut butter cookies and lemon-blueberry bundt cake. The final section, "Desserts You Can Live With", offers seven recipes that range from mixed berry cobbler to mango mousse.

== Reception ==
Publishers Weekly believed that the recipes were "fairly healthful, if uninspired," further stating that "fans of Jones's talk show will appreciate the author's personal, chatty style." Barbara Perry of the East Bay Times praised the sweet potato chocolate cake recipe; however, she believed that the cookbook should have included more recipes. The book was one of Walmart's best-selling cookbooks for the week of August 14, 2006.
