= The Jenny Jones Show =

American television talk show (1991–2003)

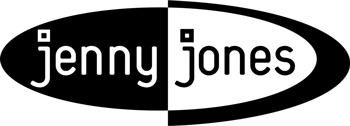
- Logo used from 1999 to 2002
- Also known as: Just Between Us
- Genre: Talk show
- Created by: Jim Paratore
- Directed by: Tom Maguire; Neil Flagg
- Presented by: Jenny Jones
- Country of origin: United States
- Original language: English
- No. of seasons: 12
- No. of episodes: 2,000+

Production
- Executive producers: David Salzman; Stuart Crowner (1991–1992); Debby Harwick Glavin (1992–2000); Ed Glavin (1992–2000); Kerrie Moriarity (2000–2003)
- Production locations: NBC Tower, Chicago
- Running time: 42–43 minutes
- Production companies: River Tower Productions; Telepictures Productions; David Salzman Enterprises (1991–1993; 1997–2003); Quincy Jones-David Salzman Entertainment (1993–1997)

Original release
- Network: Syndication
- Release: September 16, 1991 – May 21, 2003

The Jenny Jones Show (Note: The show's title is commonly shortened to Jenny Jones.) is an American daytime talk show that was hosted by Jenny Jones. The show ran in syndication for twelve seasons from September 16, 1991, to May 21, 2003, in which it broadcast over 2,000 episodes. Taped at the NBC Tower, the show premiered as a traditional talk show with a focus on cooking, fashion, and celebrities. It reformatted into a tabloid talk show for its second season, where its focus shifted to single-issue panel discussions with everyday people. Guests discussed their personal experiences over a given topic, which often involved relational transgressions. These discussions were moderated by Jones, who placed a heavy emphasis on audience interaction. The show frequently featured music performances during makeover segments or at other breaks in the show.

The show was produced by River Tower Productions in association with Telepictures Productions and David Salzman Enterprises (Note: In 1993, David Salzman Enterprises merged with Quincy Jones Entertainment to form Quincy Jones-David Salzman Entertainment; the show was produced by the joint venture until its 1997 dissolution.), and it was distributed by Warner Bros. Domestic Television Distribution. It was conceived as an alternative to the tabloid talk shows of the early 1990s, with producers hoping to replicate the success of Jones's nightclub act Girls' Night Out. Prior to its premiere, the show received a six-week trial run on KVVU-TV under the title Just Between Us. The show received the largest launch in syndicated talk show history, although its first season was met with modest ratings. After it reformatted, the show became one of the highest-rated talk shows of the 1990s. It was canceled in 2003 following a general decline in popularity of the tabloid talk show subgenre.

The show received a positive reception from television critics upon its premiere, with the Los Angeles Times citing it as the best new daytime talk show of 1991. It experienced a negative reception after its reformat, with criticism directed at its sensational topics and purported exploitation of guests. It received two Nancy Susan Reynolds Awards and three Excellence in Media's Silver Angel Awards. In 1995, the show became subject to a national media frenzy after a guest murdered another guest three days after an episode's taping. The show prevailed in a highly-publicized negligence lawsuit filed by the victim's family, and a national discussion over shock value and tabloid television ensued. The show has influenced other pieces of media and it launched the careers of celebrities such as Rude Jude.

== Format ==
An overview of the studio from a 1994 episode

The Jenny Jones Show is an hour-long daytime talk show that was hosted by television presenter Jenny Jones. It primarily featured stand-up, audience interaction, and guest interviews. Jones hosted segments and moderated interviews in front of a studio audience, who frequently engaged in these discussions. According to Jones, the show was "carefully scripted" and segments often pertained to cooking, fashion, and celebrities. In addition to how-to and expert advice segments, Jones hosted recurring segments such as Purse Check, where Jones gave $100 to whoever could produce a specified item from their purse first; Jenny's Male Bag, where male viewers shared their pet peeves; Jenny's Baby Book, where viewers sent in their baby photos to be shared on the show; and Take a Bow, which highlighted a person who had done something special for their local community.

Upon its second season, the show reformatted into a tabloid talk show. Most episodes now focused on a single topic, often sensational in nature, that was discussed among a panel of ordinary people. In a typical episode, the guests, usually in pairs, were seated on a stage situated in front of a studio audience. The guests discussed their personal experiences, which often involved some type of relational transgression. Jones moderated these discussions, in which she asked the guests questions or offered advice. During these discussions, Jones walked throughout the studio audience and periodically handed off her microphone to audience members to make additional comments. These audience members generally offered further advice or expressed criticism of the guests. The show also invited various musicians to perform during breaks in the show.

== Production ==
=== Conception and development ===
We think Jenny will fill something that's missing in daytime [television]. She's beautiful but not off-putting. She's funny but not hard-edged. She has this way of disarming people and making them feel comfortable, so they end up saying more than they would normally say.

— Paratore on Jones hosting the show.

In 1986, Jones became the first woman to win the comedy category of Star Search, which boosted her career as a stand-up comedian. Following Star Search, Jones served as a supporting act for other performers, such as Dionne Warwick and Engelbert Humperdinck. Jones's performances received positive reception from audiences, which inspired her to develop her own nightclub act, Girls' Night Out. Promoted as a show for women only, Girls' Night Out was a commercial success and it received wide coverage by the news media. Following a story by 20/20, Jones received various offers for sitcoms, game shows, news programs, and commercials. Jim Paratore, senior vice president of Telepictures Productions, offered Jones her own talk show, as he believed that audiences would find her relatable. Jones enthusiastically accepted the offer, stating, "I always wanted to do a talk show, but I just figured no one would let me have one."

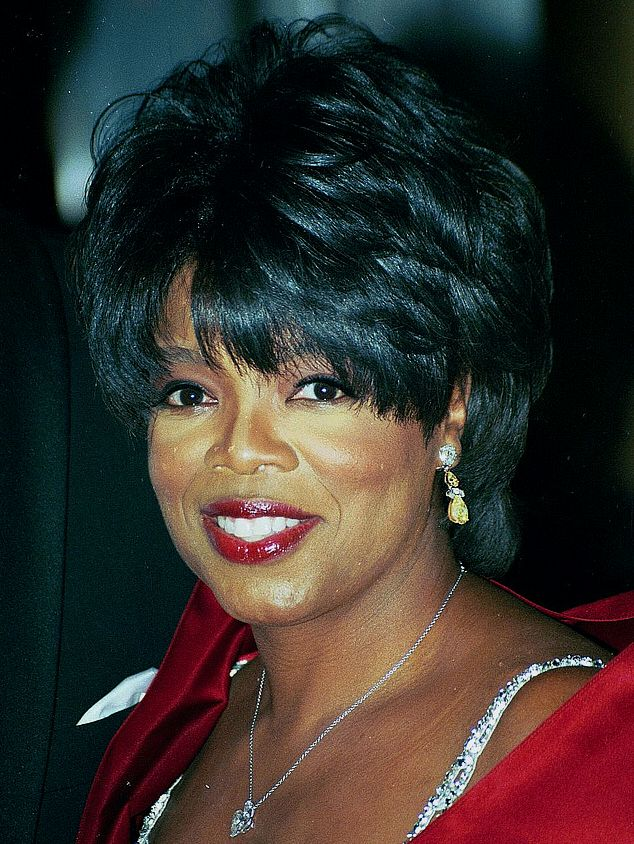
Jones was inspired by Oprah Winfrey

The Jenny Jones Show was initially conceived as an alternative to the sensational tabloid talk shows that aired in the early 1990s. According to executive producer David Salzman, the studio wanted to replicate the formula of Girls' Night Out, in which Jones would "tell jokes, sing comic songs and discuss casual topics, always leaving time for the crowd to air a few pet peeves." Jones further described her vision of the show as "part pajama party, part group therapy, part Oprah." A production staff of approximately 60 people were hired for the show, several of whom had previously worked for The Oprah Winfrey Show. According to Jones, she attended a taping of The Phil Donahue Show in preparation for the taping of the pilot. The pilot was taped at WTTW-TV's studio in the summer of 1990, and it was produced by Bonnie Kaplan. Jones stated that three shows were taped over two days, which were then edited together to form the pilot.

To further prepare Jones for her hosting responsibilities, Warner Bros. Domestic Television Distribution scheduled a trial run of the show titled Just Between Us, which aired from April 15 to May 24, 1991. The trial run was tested on KVVU-TV in Las Vegas—an unmetered market—which allowed Jones to gain experience and for producers to fine-tune the show without concern for overnight ratings. The trial run episodes included interviews with celebrities such as Phyllis Diller, Rip Taylor, and Kenny Kerr. Following the end of each taping, audience members filled out questionnaires about their reaction to the show and suggestions for topics. Warner Bros. Domestic Television Distribution had not used this strategy before, although the studio wanted the show to premiere as "the best product we can put on the air". Following this trial run, the show's production relocated to Chicago, where it was taped in WMAQ-TV's Studio A at the NBC Tower.

=== Topic selection ===
Topic selection was primarily the responsibility of the show's producers, who relied on news stories, suggestions by viewers, and their own experiences. The producers typically presented Jones with an episode's topic the night before it was taped, in which they provided her with a folder of background information on the guests and a loose script to follow. However, Jones claimed that she was "fairly vocal" about the types of topics she was comfortable with discussing on the show and she often revised the scripts. While Jones was not charged with any production responsibilities, she chose to become more involved as the show progressed. She claimed that, by that the second or third season, she was involved in every aspect of the show aside from guest recruitment. As Jones's involvement increased, the show shifted its focus from multiple topics per episode to single-topic discussions.

==== Original format ====
The show initially focused on several topics per episode, often alternating between heavy and light subject matters. Giovanna Breu of People summarized the show's typical content as "sex, divorce[,] and dieting", while Rick Kogan of the Chicago Tribune described it as "viewer-friendly fluff". The show's premiere featured discussions about eating, in which the audience was provided cake, and an interview with a pet expert who brought puppies and cats. Subsequent episodes featured interviews and segments such as the secrets of soap-opera actors, a boy who is allergic to everything, a woman whose husband fled the country with all her money, and a female photographer for Playgirl. Jones attempted to distance the show from the tabloid talk show subgenre, stating, "[The show is] not for people who are looking for the sensational tabloid stuff. We will still do serious topics, but we will do them with a smile."

On February 27, 1992, a single-topic episode was broadcast where Jones revealed that she had suffered complications from silicone breast implants for the past eleven years. Jones, whose implants ruptured in December 1991, was inspired to share her experience after an advisory panel to the Food and Drug Administration recommended that silicone breast implants be severely restricted for cosmetic use due to health concerns. The highly publicized episode marked a turning point for the show; it inspired the producers—who believed the show needed a "content transplant"—to focus on "more serious topics". According to Paratore, producers specifically wanted "to draw more on Jenny's deep sense of caring". Executive producer Stuart Crowner was replaced with Ed Glavin and Debbie Harwick Glavin, former producers of The Phil Donahue Show. The duo planned to focus more on relationships rather than comedy and entertainment.

==== Reformat ====
The show reformatted into a tabloid talk show for its second season, which included a shift to single-topic episodes. In an effort to boost the show's modest ratings, Glavin claimed that the new production staff "went all out [with the topics]". It began to feature more controversial and sensational topics, such as "I Hate My Father for Marrying a Black Woman", "My Stepfather Is Now My Lover", and "Pregnant Women Who Cheat". The show primarily discussed sex, relationship issues, family conflict, and unconventional romances. However, Jones and the producers made a conscious decision to avoid nudity and physical confrontations, which frequently appeared in other shows in the subgenre. Jones believed it would detract from the show, stating, "we try to use a little restraint. In the end, we’d like to think people can get some help [from watching the show]."

Two of the shows most common topics were makeovers and boot camp for misbehaved teenagers. The New York Times's David Sedaris claimed that the show limited itself to makeovers following the 1995 murder of guest Scott Amedure. Other television critics claimed that the show softened its content in response. However, Jones rejected these allegations, stating, "We do the same kind of show ... We haven't changed a thing." In addition to makeovers and boot camp, the show continued to feature topics such as paternity tests, secret crushes, neighborly disputes, and unruly teenagers. In August 2000, Kerrie Moriarity replaced Glavin and Harwick Glavin as executive producer after the latter two exited the show to work on The Queen Latifah Show. Similar topics were discussed under Moriarity, with the Chicago Tribune's Steve Johnson describing a typical episode topic as "your big-breasted teen daughter is obsessed with sex".

The show attempted to provide a balance between light and serious topics. According to Jones, the show produced one or two "newsier" episodes a week and its lighter episodes still conveyed important information. For example, an episode about uncommitted relationships may feature a discussion about the importance of safe sex. Some of the show's more topical episodes included discussions about the AIDS epidemic, Iraq–United States relations, racism, and wrongful convictions. Despite its broad range of topics, the show was "known primarily for its low-road approach". A Chicago Tribune staff writer summarized the show's typical subject matter as "give a lie detector test to my cheating, DNA-test-taking baby’s daddy so my bad kid can go to boot camp". Its topics were typically reflected through exaggerated episode titles, such as "I Roll with My Teen, Because Ecstasy Is Our Scene" and "I Flash My Body 'Cuz I'm the Next 'Girls Gone Wild' Hottie!"

=== Guest and audience recruitment ===
The show recruited guests through posted notices in the middle of episodes—known as carts—which provided viewers with upcoming episode topics and the show's phone number. Each cart received anywhere from 10 to 200 responses, and the show booked approximately 3,000 guests per year. According to one producer, the show sought guests who had socially relevant stories that could inform viewers. Jones claimed that she related to many of the guests' experiences, further stating that the guests were "representative of a lot of other people in the country and their problems." The show did not pay guests for their appearance; however, guests were reimbursed for air fare, hotel rooms, meals, and sometimes lost wages. The show additionally featured a series of recurring guests, such as drill sergeant Raymond Moses and comedian Rude Jude.

It was a priority among producers to only air authentic stories, with all guests undergoing comprehensive screening procedures. Prior to their appearance on the show, all guests were required to provide production staff with their Social Security numbers and photo identification, in addition to signing an agreement affirming that their stories were authentic. Guests who were minors were required to be accompanied by a parent or legal guardian, who had to provide written proof of guardianship to the producers. According to Jones, the show also "check[ed] divorce records, hospital records, police reports, anything that will help us." In addition to this screening process, microphones were placed in the green room so that producers could monitor guest conversations. Several segments were scrapped after guests inadvertently revealed that they fabricated their story to appear on the show, with the show even considering legal action in one instance.

Jones believed that the audience was imperative to the show's success, stating, "They set the pace. They set the tone-groaning, talking back—it’s totally spontaneous. As a group they have a whole lot of power." To attend as an audience member, a person could call the show to request tickets. Tickets were issued based on availability, and the show recommended that those interested in attending a taping request tickets at least six weeks in advance. Audience members agreed to a two-hour time commitment, restrictions on their apparel, and a security screening prior to being seated. Those that spoke during a taping were sometimes issued a "VIP" ticket, in which the audience member was immediately reseated in a more accessible area so that they may speak again. The show's audience primarily consisted of women upon its premiere; however, its demographic broadened after its reformat.

=== Music performances ===
The Jenny Jones Show often featured live music performances during makeover segments or at other breaks in the show. The show launched a "Local Band Search" in its sixth season, in which developing artists were invited to send a taped performance to the show's producers. Producers contacted artists that they were interested in with an offer to perform on the show. The show continued to occasionally incorporate music performances in the following seasons, although it became a common fixture in its ninth season. According to Glavin, the show included music performances in at least 70 percent of episodes, as the producers wanted to increase the show's production and distinguish it from other single-issue talk shows. One of the show's producers, Fernita Wynn, served as its music supervisor. According to Wynn, the show sought "what's young, hot, and hip [in music] ... [w]e'll book just about anyone, if people around the office like them."

Wynn claimed that artists were informed of an episode's topic in advance, and she rescheduled performances if an artist was uncomfortable with the topic. The show featured many R&B artists, with Brett Wright, vice president of marketing and music development for RCA Records, citing the show as a forum for developing acts. In 2000, the show formed a partnership with Billboard Talent Net, which provided more unsigned and developing artists with an opportunity to perform on the show. The show gave a daytime platform to numerous artists, including Usher, Ludacris, Chubby Checker, Nelly, and Three 6 Mafia. Since the show's conclusion, performances by some artists, such as Dinosaur Jr. and The Lemonheads, have received retrospective praise, while others have seen a commercial release. In addition to these performances, the show also featured theme music; Jones, a former musician, was responsible for some of these songs.

== Broadcast history and release ==
The Jenny Jones Show was syndicated worldwide. In the United States, it was distributed by Warner Bros. Domestic Television Distribution and placed in first-run syndication on September 16, 1991. The show was broadcast on 178 television stations nationwide, which was the largest launch in syndicated talk show history. Despite modest ratings, Warner Bros. Domestic Television Distribution opted to renew the show for a second season on April 14, 1992. However, its coverage dropped to 124 television stations. The show's ratings subsequently improved due to its reformat, which resulted in many television stations either upgrading its time slots or reacquiring the show. It was renewed for a third season on January 11, 1993, and its sales terms shifted from an all-barter basis to cash-plus-barter. The show was renewed for a fourth season on December 20, 1993, due to continued ratings and demographic growth.

The show's ratings surged in its fourth season, which resulted in Jones signing a five-year deal with Warner Bros. Domestic Television Distribution to continue the show. The show received more favorable time slots from television stations, some broadcast it twice a day, and others paired it with popular talk shows like Ricki Lake. The show reached the milestone of its 1,000th episode on February 26, 1997, and its 2,000th episode the week of April 15, 2002. In the 2000s, the tabloid talk show subgenre experienced a general decline in popularity as audiences began to favor game shows. While the show was once again renewed, its contracts with many stations only extended to the end of 2001. The show faced an uncertain future throughout its eleventh season, which resulted in Warner Bros. Domestic Television Distribution considering options such as a shift in barter arrangements or a "Best of Jenny Jones" series.

On April 21, 2002, it was announced that Tribune Broadcasting had made a groupwide station deal to carry the show on its 23 stations. As a result, the show secured a twelfth season and received coverage in more than 85 percent of the country. On January 31, 2003, production staff were informed that the show would likely be canceled. Its finale was broadcast on May 21, 2003, and reruns continued throughout the summer, with an unaired episode burned off in August. The show broadcast over 2,000 episodes throughout its run; TV Guide has cited its episode count as either 2,243 or 2,252. It was replaced by The Sharon Osbourne Show, which recruited former producers of and repurposed materials from the show. Episodes were available for individual purchase from Video Archives and some have been archived online. Since the show's conclusion, Jones has maintained that she has no interest in returning to television.

== Reception ==
=== Television viewership and ratings ===
The show's first season received modest ratings. It premiered to a ratings share of 2.2/9, with the first season averaging a 2 in national ratings. As a result, the show ranked 104th out of 189 shows tracked by Nielsen Media Research. Some television stations believed that the show faced difficulty in viewership as Jones's name recognition was not as strong as her contemporaries. There was heavy speculation that the show would be canceled, with some stations even dropping it in favor of Vicki! However, it was ultimately renewed and reformatted into a tabloid talk show.

The show's ratings surged in its fourth season. The show averaged a 4.5 rating, which made it the third most watched talk show of the television season. This was an 88 percent increase from the previous year, and the show overtook many contemporaries such as The Phil Donahue Show and Geraldo. By December 1995, the show was averaging a 4.6 rating; this made it the highest rated talk show behind only The Oprah Winfrey Show.

By February 1995, the show jumped from a 1.9 rating to a 3.1, which was a 63 percent increase from the previous year.

The show's seventh season averaged a 3.9, which was a six percent decrease from the previous season. However, by August 1997, the show's ratings surpassed The Oprah Winfrey Show in the key demographic of women 18-34. The show's eighth season averaged a 3.8, which made it the eighth most watched daytime syndicated show. Its ratings dropped to an average of 3.2 in its ninth season and by the beginning of its eleventh season, it was averaging a 2.0. By February 2003, the show's twelfth season had averaged a 1.5 national household rating, which was a 21 percent decline from its previous season and a 70 percent decline from its peak. The show was ranked 104th among all syndicated shows, and averaged a 0.9 among adults 18-49. The show additionally received international success; at one point it was one of the top five programs for its parent channels in countries like Canada, the United Kingdom, and the Netherlands.

Paratore claimed that the show still received decent ratings in its final season; however, it struggled with getting "quality advertisers."

=== Critical response ===
The show received a positive reception from television critics upon its premiere. Many critics praised Jones's personality and humor, although some felt that the show's topics lacked substance. Jefferson Graham of USA Today complimented the show's "pajama-party feel" and Jones's upbeat commentary, while Laurence Vittes of The Hollywood Reporter claimed Jones had a charming personality. The Chicago Tribune's Rick Kogan believed that Jones was quick-witted and had a friendly demeanor. Howard Rosenberg of the Los Angeles Times referred to the show as the best new daytime talk program of 1991, in which he claimed that "There is no one funnier or fresher in daytime [than Jones]." Michael Abramowitz of The Washington Post believed that Jones connected well with the audience, although he claimed the show lacked depth. Kogan and People's Giovanna Breu similarly noted the show's topics as standard for daytime television.

The show faced mounting criticism after it reformatted into a tabloid talk show. Television executive Mike Rosen attributed this criticism to the show's transition from "a good, interesting, amusing show aimed at women ... [to] can-you-top-this sensationalism." The Chicago Sun-Times's Robert Feder described the show as "creatively bankrupt", in which he cited episodes such as "His Bachelor Party Ruined Our Marriage" and "Mom Stole My Boyfriend". Staff writers for Crain's Chicago Business were unfavorable toward the show's new topics; however, they maintained that the criticism against the show was excessive. Criticism against the show increased following Amedure's murder. According to Variety's Jim Benson, the situation was "the worst PR for the [talk show] genre" in over half a decade. Some critics claimed that the show was an instigating factor in Amedure's death and many criticized its tabloid nature and purported use of "ambush" tactics.

The show became "a favored target of critics" in the years following Amedure's murder. New York listed it as one of the worst television shows of 1995, the New York Daily News labeled it the worst syndicated talk show of 1996, and it was voted the second worst show of 1997 in a critics poll by Electronic Media. The Orlando Sentinel's Hal Boedeker claimed that Jones was the "queen of trash TV" and that the show was a "garbage-riddled freak fest". The New York Times's Walter Goodman believed the show was overly crude. Philip Kennicott of The Washington Post criticized the show's fluctuation between serious and tabloid-style topics, with specific focus on its boot camp episodes. Jones believed that critics took an elitist view of the show; she claimed that it featured discussions that were actually relatable to many people. Since its conclusion, the show has received retrospective praise as part of the tabloid talk show subgenre.

=== Cultural impact ===
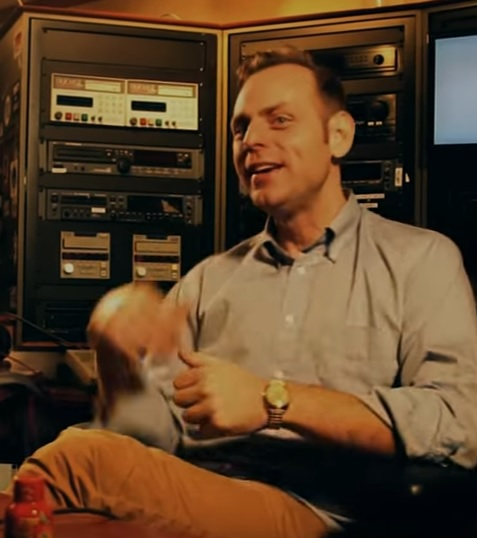
The show launched Rude Jude's career

The show is credited with making numerous contributions to the talk show genre. Its slow-to-build success was used by syndicators to convince television stations to carry struggling talk shows such as The Roseanne Show, The Queen Latifah Show, and Carnie! According to The Washington Post, the show helped popularize the use of paternity tests and makeovers in talk shows which later became standards of the genre. Guests such as Retta and Rude Jude have credited the show with launching their careers and it provided publicity to others such as Alan Abel. The show's music segments helped to provide a platform for many developing artists. Additionally, the show's frequent makeover episodes spawned the slang phrase a "Jenny Jones makeover", which is used to denote a significant change in appearance.

The show was a major inspiration for the television series Night Stand with Dick Dietrick and Nip/Tuck, the latter of which was specifically influenced by its makeover episodes. The show further influenced films Talk to Me and Murder Live!, theatrical play Sleeping with Straight Men, and numerous documentaries including Talked to Death and Trial by Media, all of which focused on its association with Amedure's murder. The show was explored more holistically in the 2026 ABC documentary series Dirty Talk: When Daytime Talk Shows Ruled TV. Jones and fictional episodes of the show appeared in the series finale of Doogie Howser, M.D. and the film Man of the Year. In terms of music, it has been referenced in popular songs such as in Sporty Thievz's "No Pigeons" and Eminem's "Drug Ballad". The show also inspired literature such as Gini Graham Scott's 1996 book "Can We Talk?: The Power and Influence of Talk Shows".

=== Awards ===
Awards and nominations
Award	Year (Note: Indicates the year of ceremony)	Category	Nominee(s)	Result	Ref.
Nancy Susan Reynolds Awards	1995	Talk Show	"People Who Contracted HIV as Teens"	Won	
Nancy Susan Reynolds Awards	1996	Talk Show	"AIDS in America"	Won	
Excellence in Media's Silver Angel Award	1998	National Television	"DNA Evidence Set Me Free"	Won	
Excellence in Media's Silver Angel Award	2000	National Television	"HIV Babies Turned Teens"	Won	
Excellence in Media's Silver Angel Award	2001	National Television	"Bring on the Tears! We Are Reuniting After Twenty, Thirty, or Forty Years"	Won	

== Murder and litigation ==
On March 6, 1995, the show taped an episode titled "Revealing Same Sex Secret Crush", in which six guests were invited to meet their secret admirers. The show informed the guests that their secret admirer could either be male or female; however, all of the guests were actually the same sex as their secret admirer. In the episode's third segment, Scott Amedure, a 32-year-old gay man, revealed that he had a crush on Jonathan Schmitz, a 24-year-old straight man. Schmitz claimed that he was flattered by the crush but "definitely heterosexual". Three days after the episode's taping, Schmitz purchased a shotgun, drove to Amedure's home, and killed him by firing two shots into his chest. Schmitz called 911 to confess to the killing and he was arrested and charged with first-degree murder. Schmitz claimed that he killed Amedure as he was humiliated over the revelation of a same-sex crush.

The episode was shelved in response to Amedure's death. The following week, Jones issued a statement on the show where she extended her sympathy to Amedure's family and emphasized "that this tragedy is about the actions of [Schmitz]." Jones and the show's producers were required to testify at Schmitz's criminal trial, where he utilized the gay panic defense. Schmitz was ultimately convicted of the lesser-charge of second-degree murder. The show was also subject to a negligence lawsuit filed by Amedure's family. Jones similarly testified at the trial, which was widely reported on by the news media and increased public interest in the case. The jury found in favor of Amedure's family for a damages award of $25 million; however, the show ultimately prevailed after the decision was overturned by the Michigan Court of Appeals. The case was appealed up to the Supreme Court of the United States, which declined to hear it.
