= Georgia Equality =

LGBTQ rights advocacy group in Georgia, USA

Georgia Equality, Inc.
- The Georgia Equality logo

- U.S. State of Georgia
- Founded: 1995
- Type: 501(c)(4)
- Registration no.: 0044761 (GA)
- Legal status: Corporation
- Headquarters: Atlanta, Georgia
- Region served: Georgia
- Key people: Jeff Graham, CEO Toby Bryan, CFO Tonya Keith, Secretary
- Website: georgiaequality.org

Equality Foundation of Georgia, Inc.
- Founded: 1995
- Type: 501(c)(3)
- Tax ID no.: 58-2346744
- Legal status: Corporation
- Location: Savannah, Georgia
- Board of directors: 15
- Key people: Jeff Graham, Executive director Kimberly Krautter, Adv. Chair Toby Bryan, Treasurer
- Revenue: $1,230,143 (2019)
- Expenses: $1,118,951 (2019)
- Funding: Gifts; grants
- Volunteers: 67

Georgia Equality (previously the Georgia Equality Project) is the largest LGBTQ rights advocacy group in Georgia. Their mission is to advance fairness, safety and opportunity for lesbian, gay, bisexual, transgender, queer and allied communities in Georgia. Their work has included political endorsements, boycotts, protests, advertising campaigns, and lobbying.

It is based in Atlanta and was founded in 1995. A Savannah chapter was formed in 1998, and is the only chapter outside of Atlanta. The organization is a member of the Equality Federation.

== See also ==
- LGBT rights in Georgia (U.S. state)
- LGBT history in Georgia (U.S. state)
- List of LGBT rights organizations
