= The Jane Whitney Show =

American television talk show

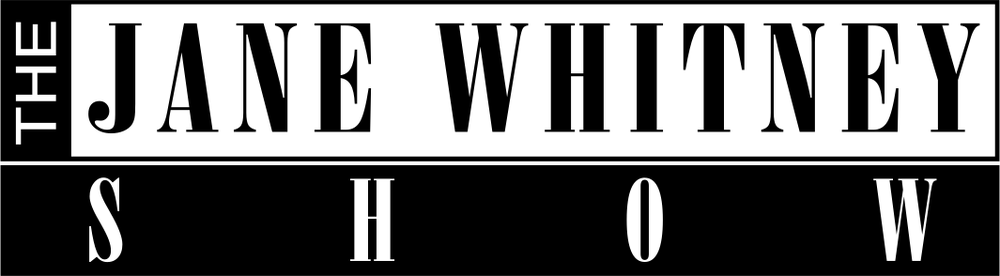
- Also known as: NightTalk with Jane Whitney
- Genre: Talk show
- Created by: Jim Paratore
- Directed by: Mark Gentile
- Presented by: Jane Whitney
- Country of origin: United States
- Original language: English

Production
- Executive producers: Pamela K. Brown (1992); Cathy Chermol (1992–1994)
- Running time: 42–43 minutes
- Production companies: Telepictures Productions; Scripps-Howard Productions

Original release
- Network: Syndication (1992–1994); NBC (1994)
- Release: March 30, 1992 – 1994

The Jane Whitney Show (Note: The show was broadcast in late-night markets as NightTalk with Jane Whitney.) is an American talk show that was hosted by Jane Whitney. The show ran for two seasons from March 30, 1992, to 1994. It was placed in first-run syndication until its cancelation in January 1994; however, NBC picked up the show. While it was syndicated, it appeared in 19 of the largest 20 TV markets.

== Format ==
The Jane Whitney Show is an hour-long talk show that was hosted by news reporter Jane Whitney. It was broadcast as NightTalk with Jane Whitney in late-night markets.

== Production ==
=== Conception and development ===
In 1992, Whitney claimed that "a talk show is really the only thing I've ever wanted to do."

In 1993, the show's production relocated to Manhattan, where it was taped at Unitel Video's Studio 55.

=== Topic selection ===
The show featured topics such as "I Was Fired Because of My Beautiful Body", "Transsexual Relationships", "Teenagers Who Kill Their Friends", and "Couples Who Are Too Busy for Sex". However, Whitney claimed that the titles were "just a titillation factor" and that she approached the topics as serious journalism.

=== Guest and audience recruitment ===
Two guests claimed that they received a three-day, two-night trip to New York and $100 each for their appearance on the show.

== Broadcast history and release ==
The show was renewed for a second season on January 15, 1993. By February 1993, the show received coverage in 62 percent of the United States. On November 23, 1993, Warner Bros. Domestic Television Distribution announced that the show was canceled and that it would conclude in January 1994. However, in December 1993, the show was picked up by NBC as a replacement for the game shows Caesars Challenge and Concentration. It premiered on NBC on January 17, 1994.

Episodes of the show were available for individual purchase from Video Archives, a company that sold tapes of major talk shows.
