= Romantic secrecy =

Romance kept private from others

Romantic secrecy, also referred to in the scientific literature as a secret relationship or secret romance, is a type of romantic relationship in which the partners deliberately attempt to conceal some aspect of their involvement from one or more other people. Most couples who keep their relationship secret do so because they anticipate a negative response if others were to discover it. Examples include, but are not limited to, same-sex relationships, interracial, intergenerational or interethnic partnerships, workplace romances, and extradyadic (outside-the-primary) involvements. Such relationships vary depending on why they are being kept secret, from whom the secret is being concealed, and what the perceived consequences of disclosure might be.

== Implications ==
Like other dating strategies that humans have developed, romantic secrecy carries both risks and potential benefits. Evolutionary psychology views human mating behaviour as a flexible repertoire of strategies, short-term and long-term, adapted to solve different challenges. From this perspective, romantic secrecy may serve adaptive functions in some contexts, while also creating vulnerabilities in others.

Potential negative outcomes in the context of romantic secrecy include reduced perceived commitment, lower self-esteem, and increased health complaints such as fatigue or anxiety. However, research also suggests that the effect of secrecy on an individual’s well-being is proportional to the amount of shame associated with it. Secrecy can further limit access to social support, which may exacerbate negative effects when individuals experience discomfort regarding the hidden relationship, especially in online contexts, which are notoriously prone to scams, manipulation, or stalking.

At the same time, secrecy can provide significant benefits. In certain situations (such as when individuals face social stigma, discrimination, or workplace consequences) concealment can serve as a protective strategy, providing privacy and autonomy and enabling individuals to pursue relationships more safely. Further, empirical findings show that for some individuals secrecy can heighten feelings of excitement acting as a motivation to engage in a relationship. For example, a study of non-monogamous individuals found that “the desire to experience the thrill of the forbidden” was significantly more pronounced in secondary (i.e., secretive) partnerships than in primary relationships.

The implications of romantic secrecy vary depending on the reasons for concealment, the audiences from whom the relationship is hidden, and the anticipated consequences of disclosure. Secrecy that is short-term or protective may be less harmful, while long-term concealment accompanied by shame tends to undermine personal well-being.

== See also ==
- Dating
- Flirting
- Secret admirer
