= Rude Jude =

American radio and TV personality and author

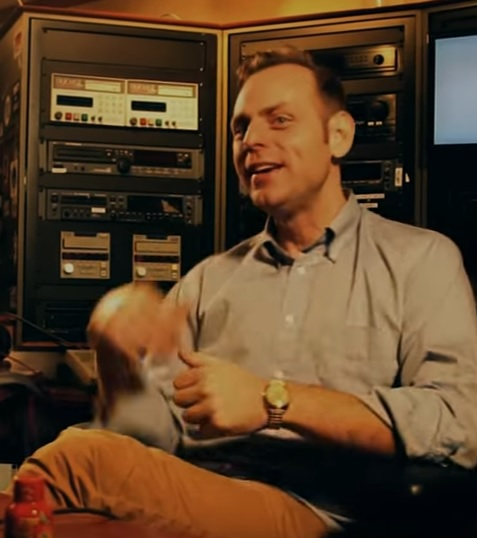
- Born: Jude Anthony Angelini; September 25, 1977 (age 48); Pontiac, Michigan, U.S.
- Occupations: Radio personality; author
- Spouse: Olivia Angelini (2025-)
- Children: Assia Angelini

Jude Anthony Angelini (born September 25, 1977), also known as Rude Jude, is an American radio and television personality and author. He began his career as a recurring guest on The Jenny Jones Show. He is best known for his radio show The All Out Show which was broadcast on SiriusXM satellite radio's Shade 45 from 2005 to November 17, 2023.

== Career ==
=== Jenny Jones ===
Jude appeared often as a guest on The Jenny Jones Show, where he first received the nickname "Rude Jude" as he insulted other participants in the show. Jones describes Jude as "the studio audience’s favorite guest."

=== Eminem ===
Based on Jude's appearances on The Jenny Jones Show, a promoter met Jude and had him introduce Eminem at a concert performance. Later, Jude was directly referenced in Eminem's song, "Drug Ballad," with the lyrics "17 years later I'm as rude as Jude."

=== Foreally show ===
From 2013 to 2015 he also hosted a weekly podcast "Foreallyshow" with childhood friend, rapper Senim Silla of Binary Star.

=== The All Out Show ===
On SiriusXM satellite radio's Shade 45, Eminem's Hip-Hop Channel, The All Out Show with Rude Jude was broadcast every weekday between 4:00pm and 7:00pm Eastern time, from May 31, 2004 through November 17th, 2023.

=== Penthouse Magazine ===
Angelini was profiled as Man of the Moment in Penthouse magazine May/June 2019 issue.

=== Proposed TV Series ===
The producers of Entourage announced plans in 2015 to create a comedy series based on Jude's book, "Hyena" but Angelini updated his listeners on the radio that Hyena show plans have been put on indefinite hold.

== Filmography ==
=== Television ===
| Year | Title | Channel/Notes |
|---|---|---|
| 2001 | The Jenny Jones Show | |
| 2017 | Slobby's World | |

== Bibliography ==
- Angelini, Jude (2014). Hyena (Paperback ed.). Gallery Books. ISBN 978-1476789309.
- Angelini, Jude (2017). Hummingbird (Paperback ed.). Rare Bird Books. ISBN 978-1945572593.
- Angelini, Jude (2022). Fin (Paperback ed.). Independently published. ISBN 979-8412375892.
