= American Journal =

American syndicated television program

- Genre: Television news magazine
- Presented by: Nancy Glass (1993–1997); Michele Dabney Perez (1997–1998); Charles Perez (1997–1998)
- Theme music composer: Rick Krizman
- Country of origin: United States
- Original language: English

Production
- Executive producer: Charles King
- Production locations: The Prospect Studios, Hollywood Center, Burbank, California (1993-1994); Sunset Las Palmas Studios, Hollywood Center, New York City (1994-1998)
- Running time: 22–24 minutes
- Production company: King World

Original release
- Network: Syndication
- Release: September 6, 1993 – September 11, 1998

American Journal (alternately titled American Journal: Coast to Coast for its final season; also known as AJ) is a syndicated television newsmagazine program that ran from 1993 to 1998. The series was distributed by King World Productions. It was hosted by Nancy Glass from its fall 1993 launch until 1997, when siblings Michele Dabney Perez and former newscaster-turned-talk show host Charles Perez took over for the show's final season on air. The show's tagline was "Stories Worth Watching".

== History ==
American Journal was created by King World as a companion to its Inside Edition program and debuted on September 6, 1993.

In early 1996, as an attempt to grow in the 18-34 demographic, the show tried then aborted plans to add an "Off the Hook" segment; King World would try again with "Team A.J." coverage strands in the fourth season helmed by Karen Duffy and Steve Santagati. By 1996, it was cleared on 124 stations serving 86 percent of the United States. King World often packaged the series with an existing magazine distributed by the same syndicator, Inside Edition, which is still on the air today and has outlasted a number of in-house and outside competitors.

The theme song throughout the show's run was an arrangement by Rick Krizman of the Shaker tune "Simple Gifts."

In the show's final season, it had a 4.1 rating and 11 share (in February 1998). The low ratings were chalked up to a glut of similar programs, such as the since-cancelled A Current Affair, and Hard Copy (which would be canceled after the 1998–99 season due to being aired in mostly low-rated or overnight time slots by that point), expanding local news (especially in the 5 p.m. hour) reducing the number of available evening time slots for the show, and the show's typical airing in a time slot opposite perennial ratings powerhouses Wheel of Fortune and Jeopardy! (also distributed by King World). While King World already had commitments from stations serving 62 percent of the country to carry AJ in the fall of 1998, one year earlier, 11 of the stations owned by Belo picked up the syndicated Hollywood Squares for the fall of 1998; which would have displaced American Journal to overnight graveyard slot. Faced with falling ratings and the potential loss of prime viewing slots, King World canceled the show after a five-year run.

== On-air staff ==
=== Anchors ===
- Nancy Glass - main anchor (1993–1997)
- Michele Dabney-Perez - co-anchor (1997–1998)
- Charles Perez - co-anchor (1997–1998)

=== Correspondents ===
Les Trent, New York; Stacey Gualandi, Los Angeles; Rhonda Guess, Los Angeles; Kit Hoover, New York; Jonathan Karsh, Los Angeles; Bob Gilmartin, New York.
