= Jenny Jones (presenter) =

Canadian television presenter

- Born: Janina Maria Stronski; June 7, 1946 (age 79); Bethlehem, Mandatory Palestine
- Occupations: Television presenter; comedian; cook; musician
- Years active: 1969–present
- Spouses: Jack Howard Poster (m. 1969; ann. 1970); Al Gambino (m. 1970; div. 1972); Buz Wilburn (m. 1973; div. 1980)
- Partner: Denis McCallion (1986–present)

Janina Maria Stronski (born June 7, 1946), known professionally as Jenny Jones, is a Canadian television presenter and comedian who is best known for hosting The Jenny Jones Show.

== Early life ==
Janina Maria Stronski was born on June 7, 1946, in Bethlehem, Palestine, to Polish parents, John Stronski, a World War II veteran, and Zosia "Sophie", a dressmaker. The family, who also had an older daughter, Helena Elizabeth, briefly moved to Italy, before relocating to London, Ontario, in 1948. A strict Catholic household, the impoverished family ran a bridal shop. Upon her parents' divorce, Jones, her mother, and sister moved to Montreal. Disheartened by her mother's alcoholism and verbal abuse, Jones began "shoplifting, drinking and necking with guys that we just picked up." Jones ran away from home at 11 years old; after one month, Jones was arrested for shoplifting and returned to her mother. Jones's mother subsequently sent her and Helena back to London to live with their father. As a teenager, Jones began to abuse alcohol, her school grades declined, and she ran away from home again. According to Jones, "I didn't want to be with either parent and couldn't wait until I was old enough to leave. Show business was my way out."

In 1963, at 17 years old, Jones dropped out of high school and formed a band that toured mining towns in Ontario. The following year, she adopted the stage name Jenny Jones and moved to Hollywood, Los Angeles. She briefly worked as a strip-club hostess, before moving to Las Vegas to form the all-female rock band The Cover Girls. The band toured throughout Nevada; impressed by Jones's performance, Wayne Newton recruited her as a background vocalist.

== Career ==
=== 1981–1990: Stand-up comedy ===
Jones started her career as a drummer in a rock band, and later began a career in stand-up comedy during the 1980s. She experienced some success with comedy, winning the 1986 season of the TV talent show Star Search. Prior to that, her first television appearances were as a contestant on The Price Is Right in 1979 (winning $12,955 in cash & prizes, including a sports car and $6,000 cash), Match Game in 1981 (as Jenny Wilburn, winning $5,500), and Press Your Luck in 1985 (as Jennie Jones, winning $18,706 over three days).

In 1986, Jones appeared as a contestant on Star Search, in which she became the first woman to win the comedy category. This appearance boosted Jones's stand-up career, and she subsequently served as a supporting act for performers including Sammy Davis Jr., Engelbert Humperdinck, Kenny Loggins, Glen Campbell, Kool & the Gang, Tony Bennett, Dionne Warwick, Gregory Hines, and Wayne Newton.

By 1983, Jones had worked her way up to serving as an opening act for Jerry Seinfeld. She embarked on a comedy show titled Girls' Night Out, which was billed as a "No Men Allowed" event. Jones sold out 10 consecutive shows and had her routine featured on 20/20.

Jones was profiled alongside other women comedians in the 1991 documentary film Wisecracks.

=== 1991–2003: The Jenny Jones Show ===
The Jenny Jones Show was conceived as an alternative to the "harder-edged" tabloid talk shows that aired at the time. The show premiered in September 1991 on 178 television stations nationwide, which was the biggest launch in syndicated talk show history. It was produced by Telepictures and was distributed by Warner Bros. Television. The show ran from September 1991 to September 2003 and was taped in Chicago at WMAQ-TV studios.

On March 6, 1995, the show taped an episode titled "Revealing Same Sex Secret Crush"; the episode featured six guests who were invited to meet their same-sex secret admirers. Three days after the episode's taping, one of the guests killed his secret admirer. Jones provided testimony in the ensuing criminal trial. In August 1995, the victim's family filed a lawsuit against The Jenny Jones Show for negligence. Jones was required to testify during the civil trial. The jury initially found in favor of the victim's family; however, this judgment was reversed by the Michigan Court of Appeals. The court found that the murder was "unforeseeable" and that the show "had no duty to anticipate and prevent the act of murder committed by [the killer] three days after leaving [the] studio and hundreds of miles away".

In November 1997, Jones released an autobiography, Jenny Jones: My Story, which was co-authored with Patsi Bale Cox.

In 2003, The Jenny Jones Show broadcast its twelfth and final season. Since the show's conclusion, Jones has maintained that she has no interest in returning to television.

=== 2004–present: Philanthropy and Jenny Can Cook ===
Since the conclusion of The Jenny Jones Show, Jones has maintained a relatively low profile. In 2005, she founded The Jenny Jones Foundation which provided assistance to underserved communities in Canada and the United States. In April 2006, she released a cookbook, Look Good, Feel Great Cookbook, and donated all of its proceeds to City of Hope Breast Cancer Research Treatment and Education. In 2008, Jones established Jenny's Heroes, a program in which she provided grants to people she deemed heroes in the United States. It was later expanded to include Jenny's Heroes Canada and Jenny's Heroes California, which also provided grants to volunteer firefighters. That same year, Jones established a YouTube channel and blog called Jenny Can Cook where she shares recipes. She stated that her "goal is to motivate more people to cook at home and make healthy eating a priority."

== Personal life ==
Jones has been married three times. She married Al Gambino, a musician, in 1970; they divorced in 1972. Jones married Buz Wilburn, a record marketing executive, in 1973; they divorced in 1980. An earlier marriage was annulled. She is in a long-term relationship with Denis McCallion, a film-location manager.

=== Women's health advocate ===
Jones was an honorary chairperson for the Susan G. Komen for the Cure Chicago Race for the Cure, an annual event that raises awareness and money for breast cancer research. Jones also donated a mobile mammography motor coach to John H. Stroger Jr. Hospital of Cook County. Six silicone-implant operations since 1981 had left her with firm and asymmetrical breasts. Jones later had her breast implants removed, and publicly spoke out against them in a cover story article in People.

In 1992, Jones established the Image Foundation, which provided medical, legal, and psychological services to women who wanted to remove their breast implants.

== Bibliography ==
- Jenny Jones: My Story (1997)
- Look Good, Feel Great Cookbook (2006)
