= Charles Perez =

American journalist

- Born: Charles Dabney
- Occupations: Talk show host, television journalist, writer
- Years active: 1993–present
- Spouse: Keith Rinehard (m. 2009)
- Children: 1

Charles Dabney, known professionally as Charles Perez, is an American writer and television news reporter, anchor and talk show host. He served as the host of The Charles Perez Show from 1994 to 1996.

== Career ==
Perez was in the news business in the 1990s through the 2000s, during which he anchored and reported for WABC-TV in New York City; WPLG, ABC's then-affiliate in Miami, Florida; and WSVN, the Fox television affiliate in Miami. Before that, Perez was known as host of the nationally syndicated The Charles Perez Show. The show was produced by Tribune Entertainment and ran from 1994 until 1996.

Following that, he anchored King World's nationally syndicated news magazine show, American Journal, along with his sister, Michele Dabney-Perez, during its final season, replacing Nancy Glass. Perez has also worked as a reporter for the Los Angeles station KCAL-TV, as a producer of The Ricki Lake Show and The Montel Williams Show.

Perez was the main evening anchor at ABC's then-Miami affiliate WPLG. He was terminated from this position on August 6, 2009, after he filed a discrimination complaint against the station, regarding supposed prejudice over what his attorney cited as the increasing public awareness of his sexual orientation that resulted in his being removed from anchoring Channel 10's weeknight newscasts. Previously he was a weekday reporter and the weekend anchor at WABC-TV in New York City until 2006. He co-anchored the 6 p.m. and 11 p.m. weekend editions of Eyewitness News with Sandra Bookman.

Perez made an appearance during the first season of MTV's The Real World when he appeared on-camera as one-half of a couple with Norman Korpi. According to Perez, the two were never linked in a relationship, though the MTV producers portrayed them as if they were.

Perez's autobiography, Confessions of a Gay Anchorman, was published in 2011.

As of August 2023, Perez is the weekday morning news anchor at ABC affiliate WLOS in Asheville, North Carolina.

== Personal life ==
Perez was involved in a legal battle with his ex-partner. Perez alleges negative publicity from his legal battle led WPLG to demote him.

In September 2009, Perez married his partner, Keith Rinehard, in Westport, Connecticut. They adopted a daughter.

== See also ==
- List of American writers
- List of people from Los Angeles
- List of people from Miami
- List of people from New York City
- List of talk show hosts
