= The Charles Perez Show =

American television talk show

- Genre: Talk show
- Directed by: Alex Tyner
- Presented by: Charles Perez
- Country of origin: United States
- Original language: English
- No. of seasons: 2

Production
- Executive producers: Ray Nunn (1994–1995); Herman Williams (1995–1996)
- Production locations: CBS Broadcast Center, Manhattan
- Running time: 42–43 minutes
- Production companies: Tribune Broadcasting; Charles Dabney Perez Productions

Original release
- Network: Syndication
- Release: December 12, 1994 – January 26, 1996

The Charles Perez Show is an American daytime talk show that was hosted by Charles Perez. The show ran in syndication for two seasons from December 12, 1994, to January 26, 1996. Taped at the CBS Broadcast Center, it was formatted as a tabloid talk show. Each episode centered on a single-issue panel discussion that often involved relational transgressions. The guests, who were everyday people, discussed their personal experiences over a given topic. Perez moderated these discussions and he placed a heavy emphasis on audience interaction.

The show was produced and distributed by Tribune Entertainment. It was conceived as a youth-targeted alternative to morning news programs, with producers hoping to capitalize on Perez's youth and Latin heritage. The show received a six-week trial run prior to its national launch in March 1995. It received a mixed reception from television critics, who found Perez personable but were critical toward the show's topic selection. The show became subject to a minor controversy after it allegedly hired an actor to play a guest's sister; the guest's sister sued the show and the lawsuit was settled out of court. The show received modest ratings; however, it was ultimately canceled in January 1996. Some television critics attributed the show's cancelation to a then-overcrowded field of daytime talk shows.

== Format ==
The Charles Perez Show is an hour-long daytime talk show that was hosted by television presenter Charles Perez.

== Production ==
=== Conception and development ===
Perez began his television career as a gofer for the 1993 talk show Jane Pratt; he subsequently worked in production roles on Ricki Lake and The Montel Williams Show. Perez claimed it was his dream to host his own talk show, and he produced the pilot with money lent to him by friends. He described his vision of the show as "the perfect union of Phil Donahue and Oprah Winfrey." In an effort to target younger demographics, the show emphasized Perez's youth and Latin heritage. Perez adopted his mother's maiden name over his surname, Dabney, in an effort to "get in touch with his Latin side".

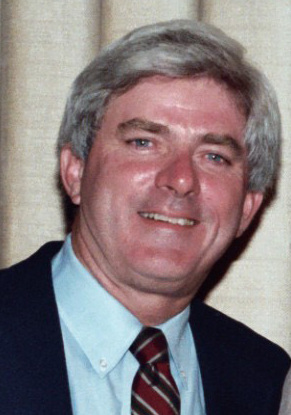
Perez was inspired by Phil Donahue

Tribune Entertainment scheduled a six-week trial run of the show, which began on December 12, 1994. The trial run was tested on Tribune Entertainment's eight owned-and-operated stations, with a national launch intended for January 1995. The trial run episodes featured topics such as botched plastic surgery procedures and interracial relationships. The show averaged a 2.6 rating in these markets, which resulted in a national launch.

=== Topic selection ===
Topic selection was overseen by producers, who relied on news stories, suggestions by viewers, and their own experiences. Producers wanted 31-year-old Perez to cover topics "from the point of view of his generation", with Perez describing the show as a youth-targeted alternative to news programs like This Week with David Brinkley. The show attempted to provide a balance between light and serious topics and, according to Perez, it produced two "issue" episodes a week. Electronic Media's Ryan Ver Berkmoes summarized the show's typical subject matter as "People whose behavior places them out of the norm, [and] people who like to fight on camera." It featured discussions on topics such as discrimination, guns in schools, street gangs, AIDS, parent-child relationships, strippers, and whether blondes have more fun. Perez attempted to distance the show from the tabloid talk show subgenre, stating that his goal was to "do good television".

=== Guest recruitment ===
The Charles Perez Show recruited guests through carts, which provided viewers with upcoming show topics and the show's phone number. Producers typically booked guests who they believed were well-spoken and had a compelling story. According to producer Hilery Kipnis, in order to book guests "you have to be a social worker, a therapist, a used-car salesman and a lawyer. You use the skills you would acquire in all these jobs to convince these [prospective guests] that this is the thing to do."

Prior to their appearance on the show, all guests were required to provide production staff with two forms of identification.

== Broadcast history and release ==
The show premiered on December 12, 1994, for a six-week trial on Tribune Broadcasting's eight owned-and-operated stations. In January 1995, following a successful trial run, Tribune Entertainment announced that the show would receive a national rollout. With this national launch, the show was picked up by 37 television stations and increased its coverage from 21 percent to 60 percent of the country. This national launch commenced on March 6, 1995; Tribune Entertainment hoped that an unconventional March launch would give the show an advantage over all the new talk shows set for a fall debut. By September 1995, the show was cleared on 80 television stations covering 86 percent of the country. Additionally, the show was syndicated internationally, in which it was distributed by Worldvision Enterprises.

On January 2, 1996, Tribune Entertainment announced that the show was canceled. It was canceled alongside 20th Television's Gabrielle, which The New York Times's Lawrie Mifflin attributed to an overabundance of daytime talk shows at the time. The show's final episode was broadcast on January 26, 1996, and many television stations looked to replace it with various court shows. Perez, a gay man, believed that Tribune Entertainment considered his sexual orientation in its decision to cancel the show.

== Reception ==
=== Television viewership and ratings ===
Seeing low ratings, most likely due to the glut of syndicated talk shows which debuted during Perez's second season, Tribune chose to cancel the program in mid-season, ending with a 1.7 average.

In December 1995, several syndicators alleged that The Charles Perez Show was likely to face cancellation due to low ratings. On January 2, 1996, The Charles Perez Show was cancelled by Tribune Entertainment. Karen Corbin, senior vice president of development at Tribune Entertainment, stated: "Because of increased competition in the talk-show genre, it is difficult to find an economic upside for Charles Perez in the near future."

=== Critical response ===
The show received a mixed reception from television critics. Irv Letofsky of The Hollywood Reporter believed Perez was personable, although he criticized Perez's line of questioning and the show's topics.

New York listed it as one of the worst television shows of 1995.

== Litigation ==
The show became a source of controversy in March 1995, when a segment aired which producers reportedly knowingly used an imposter to portray another guest's sister to fabricate a personal story for the benefit of the show. The woman whose name was used and her husband sued the show, which settled the lawsuit.
