= Nancy Glass =

American television personality and executive

- Born: Nancy Glass; Boston, Massachusetts, U.S.
- Occupation: CEO production company
- Spouse: Charles Lachman
- Children: 2

Nancy Glass is CEO of Glass Entertainment Group and formerly an American television and radio host.

== Career ==
Nancy Glass is a six time Emmy winner and the owner of Glass Entertainment Group. For the last six years, Glass Entertainment Group has been named to the Global 100, the listing of the top 100 production companies in the world. Her company has produced thousand hours of programming for networks including:ABC network, Netflix, Hulu, Paramount+, Peacock, ABC network, A&E, TLC, National Geographic, HGTV, History and CNN,

Glass Podcasts is one of the most successful in America. Their shows have had more than 200 million listens. Their titles include: Love Trapped, Betrayal, and Burden of Guilt.

In 2021 she appeared on the ABC sitcom, The Goldbergs. She played "Nancy Glass" in the 80's.

Previously she was on-air. From 1993 until 1997, Glass was an anchor for the King World syndicated news magazine, American Journal. Prior to that she was senior correspondent and weekend anchor for Inside Edition. While working at Inside Edition she became the first person in syndication nominated for a national News Emmy. She came to Inside Edition from another nationally syndicated news magazine, This Evening. It was the first national news magazine where the solo anchor was a woman. Before that, she was the co-host of Attitudes on Lifetime. Attitudes earned her an Emmy nomination as Best Daytime Talk Show Host. While hosting Attitudes she also hosted a nightly newsmagazine show, Evening Magazine in Philadelphia and added humor pieces to the PBS series Sneak Previews, reporting on the weekly "golden turkeys". Prior to this, she was the weekend anchor and reporter for Channel 5 in New York (WNYW).

She began her television career while attending Tufts University in Boston. In her sophomore year she became a management trainee at WBZ, the CBS affiliate. In her junior year she became a producer. She went on the air in her senior year as a nightly contributor on Boston's Evening Magazine program.

In 2021, it was announced that Glass and Marcus Lemonis have acquired the rights of the game show Let's Make a Deal. In 2023, she bought out Marcus to become the solo owner of the IP and the library of Hatos/Hall programming.

Other notable television and radio jobs include: Co-Host of the Miss America Pageant in 1997, interviewed Jeffrey Dahmer 1 on 1 in 1993 for Inside Edition, and repeatedly appeared as a square on Hollywood Squares 15 times.

She has been featured in: People, Entertainment Weekly, Redbook, Ladies Home Journal, Bazaar, Vogue, Fitness, Glamour, Time, The New York Times, The Los Angeles Times, The Chicago Tribune, The Philadelphia Inquirer and hundreds more publications.

For 10 years Glass was Chair of the Board of Advisors at Tufts University’s School of Arts and Sciences. She pledged an undisclosed sum to set up an endowed scholarship at the school.

Glass is married to Charles Lachman, a Pulitzer Prize nominee and author of "The Last Lincolns", "In the Name of the Law", "Footsteps in the Snow" and "A Secret Life...The lies and scandals of Grover Cleveland" and the best seller "Code Name Nemo". Charles Lachman is currently the Executive Producer of Inside Edition, an entertainment show run by CBS.
