= Tabloid television =

Form of tabloid journalism

Tabloid television, also known as teletabloid, is a form of tabloid journalism. Tabloid television news broadcasting usually incorporate flashy graphics and sensationalized stories. Often, there is a heavy emphasis on crime and celebrity news.

== Global perspective ==
The United States is not the only media market with this genre of broadcasting. Among English-speaking countries, Australia, New Zealand, and the United Kingdom all have tabloid television shows that reflect this same down-market, sensationalist style of journalism and entertainment, as do other countries such as France and Spain. Media moguls such as Rupert Murdoch can be seen as having transferred subject matter previously seen in print journalism to this television genre.

In his book Tabloid Television, John Langer argues that this type of "other news" is as equally important as the "hard news".

== Examples of tabloid television ==
Popular shows of this type include Hard Copy and A Current Affair.

A commonly cited example of tabloid television run amok is a series of reports in 2001 collectively dubbed the Summer of the Shark, focusing on a supposed epidemic of shark attacks after one highly publicized attack on an 8-year-old boy. In reality, there were fewer than average shark attacks that year.

Other examples include the coverage of 'missing white woman syndrome' stories like those of Chandra Levy, Elizabeth Smart, and Laci Peterson. Critics claim that news executives are boosting ratings with these stories, which only affect a select few people, instead of broadcasting national issues.

== See also ==
- Shock value
- Trial by Media – 2020 series about notable media-covered true crime stories
- Low culture
