= Trial by Media (TV series) =

True crime documentary television series

- Poster
- Genre: True crime Documentary series
- Directed by: Skye Borgman; Garrett Bradley; Yance Ford; Brian McGinn; Sierra Pettengill; Tony Yacenda
- Composers: Carl Dante; Scott Michael Smith; Tyler Strickland
- Country of origin: United States
- Original language: English
- No. of seasons: 1
- No. of episodes: 6

Production
- Executive producers: Jeffrey Toobin; Steven Brill; George Clooney; Brian McGinn; Jason Sterman; David Gelb; Sarah Shepard
- Running time: 57-104 minutes
- Production companies: Supper Club; Smokehouse Pictures

Original release
- Network: Netflix
- Release: May 11, 2020

Trial by Media is a true crime documentary miniseries that premiered May 11, 2020 on Netflix.

== Summary ==
The series focuses on famous court cases from the 1980s-2000s that are believed to have had their outcome affected by extensive media coverage.

== Episodes ==
| No. | Title | Directed by | Original release date |
|---|---|---|---|
| 1 | "Talk Show Murder" | Tony Yacenda | May 11, 2020 |
After Jonathan Schmitz murders his friend Scott Amedure following an appearance on The Jenny Jones Show episode "Revealing Same Sex Secret Crush", the show's future is brought into the limelight as a civil suit is filed against the producers and distributors of the show by Amedure's family.
| 2 | "Subway Vigilante" | Skye Borgman | May 11, 2020 |
On December 22, 1984, four men, Barry Allen, Troy Canty, Darrell Cabey, and James Ramseur, were shot and wounded by Bernhard Goetz. On his way home, Goetz shot the four black robbers on a New York City subway. While he claimed this was an act of self-defense, the action sets off a controversial, tabloid-fueled trial which earned Goetz the nickname "Subway Vigilante," as he said he shot the four boys after an attempted mugging.
| 3 | "41 Shots" | Garrett Bradley | May 11, 2020 |
On the morning of February 4, 1999, a 23-year-old Guinean immigrant named Amadou Diallo (born September 2, 1975) was shot and killed by four New York City Police Department plain-clothed officers—Sean Carroll, Richard Murphy, Edward McMellon and Kenneth Boss after running from the officers when asked to show his hands. Diallo was shot 41 times. Diallo was unarmed and had no criminal record. Despite the overwhelming evidence against the officers, all were found not guilty.
| 4 | "King Richard" | Brian McGinn | May 11, 2020 |
Richard Scrushy, founder of HealthSouth Corporation, was charged with 36 of 85 counts of accounting fraud in 2004.
| 5 | "Big Dan's" | Sierra Pettengill | May 11, 2020 |
The case of Cheryl Araujo.
| 6 | "Blago!" | Yance Ford | May 11, 2020 |
The case of Rod Blagojevich.

== Reception ==
The series received generally positive reception. Metacritic gave the series a weighted average score of 69 out of 100 based on 7 reviews, indicating "generally favorable reviews". Review aggregator Rotten Tomatoes reported an approval rating of 86% based on 14 reviews, with an average rating of 6.85/10 for the series. The website's critical consensus states, "A fascinating time capsule that doesn't draw many conclusions, Trial by Media considers the consequences of broadcasting high-profile court cases."
