= Secret admirer =

Individual who feels love for someone without disclosing identity

A secret admirer is an individual who feels adoration, fondness or love for another person without disclosing their identity to that person, and who might send gifts or love letters to their crush.

== Grade school ==
The goal of a secret admirer is to woo the object of their affections, and then to reveal their identity, paving the way for a real relationship – a revealing which at school age usually occurs on Valentine's Day, the day of love. Reactions to a gushy Valentine may range from approval to gross out.

Many elementary schools and sometimes schools up to secondary schools have children do Valentine's Day projects on February 14 to craft and send "secret admirer" letters to classmates, which may not actually reflect a real "crush" and may be done neutrally or arbitrarily, and, perhaps, if done under duress from the class project requirement, reluctantly.

== Office ==
Notes from a secret admirer may feature in office dating, but are not recommended as a means of approaching a colleague, and may border on sexual harassment.

Youthful passion for a celebrity stands on the boundary between secret admirer and fan; while the secret or concealed admiration of 'having eyes for' may also feature as a preliminary phase in the process of initially approaching the opposite sex.

== Cultural examples ==
The adolescent Mendelssohn wrote a song - Frage (Question) – about his own suspected secret admirer.

== See also ==
- Puppy love
- Secret dating
- Quasimodo
