= Murder of Scott Amedure =

1995 shooting in Lake Orion, Michigan

Scott Amedure
- Born: Scott Bernard Amedure; January 26, 1963; Pittsburgh, Pennsylvania, U.S.
- Died: March 9, 1995 (aged 32); Lake Orion, Michigan, U.S.
- Cause of death: Gunshot wounds
- Resting place: Clarkston, Michigan, U.S.
- Occupation: Bartender
- Known for: Murder victim

The murder of Scott Amedure occurred on March 9, 1995, at his mobile home in Lake Orion, Michigan. Amedure, who was 32 years old, was killed by 24-year-old Jonathan Schmitz, three days after they appeared as guests for the taping of an episode of the daytime talk show The Jenny Jones Show. Amedure had publicly revealed in the episode that he had a crush on Schmitz, who claimed that he was straight but flattered by the revelation. On the morning of March 9, Amedure left a sexually suggestive note on Schmitz's apartment doorstep. In response, Schmitz purchased a 12-gauge shotgun, confronted Amedure at his home, and fired two shots into Amedure's chest. Schmitz called 911 to report the killing and he was subsequently arrested.

Schmitz was charged with first-degree murder. He utilized the gay panic defense, in which he claimed that he killed Amedure over embarrassment about the revelation of a same-sex crush. Schmitz was found guilty of second-degree murder.

The Amedure family sued The Jenny Jones Show for wrongful death, although the show was ultimately found to not be liable. Amedure and Schmitz's appearance on the show was shelved, although it was later shown to jurors during the civil trial against The Jenny Jones Show. The episode was eventually broadcast on October 17, 1996, as part of Court TV's coverage of the ensuing civil trial against The Jenny Jones Show.

== Background ==
Scott Bernard Amedure was born on January 26, 1963, the youngest of six children to Frank Amedure and Patricia Graves. Aged seventeen, Amedure dropped out of high school to join the Army. He served in the Army for three years before he returned to Michigan. Amedure had a history of substance abuse, for which he entered rehabilitation programs twice. He also experienced difficulties with relationships and he had past instances of domestic violence. Amedure worked as a bartender at Club Flamingo, a gay club in Pontiac, Michigan. According to Amedure's neighbor Gayle Clinton, he "was a talk-show junkie."

On March 6, 1995, Amedure was a guest on an episode of The Jenny Jones Show titled "Revealing Same Sex Secret Crush", in which he admitted to being a secret admirer of Jonathan Schmitz, who lived near him in Lake Orion, Michigan. Until the taping, Schmitz did not know who would be revealed as his secret admirer. Schmitz stated that he participated in the show due to curiosity, and he claimed later that the producers implied that his admirer was a woman, although the producers of the show claim that they did tell Schmitz that the admirer could be male or female. During the segment, Amedure was encouraged by Jones to share his fantasies about Schmitz, after which Schmitz was brought onstage. According to The Washington Post, "[t]he two men exchanged an awkward embrace before the host dropped her bombshell." In response to Amedure's disclosure, Schmitz laughed, then stated that he was "definitely heterosexual".

== Murder ==
According to footage of the murder trial, a friend of Amedure later told producers that Amedure and Schmitz had slow danced and kissed the night after the taping, calling it a "love connection". According to testimony at the murder trial, three days after the taping, Amedure left a "suggestive" note at Schmitz's house. After finding the note, Schmitz withdrew money from a bank, purchased a shotgun, went to Amedure's mobile home, and asked Amedure if he left the note. According to court documents, Amedure responded with a smile. Schmitz then returned to his car, got his gun, and returned to Amedure's trailer. He then shot Amedure twice in the chest, killing him. After killing Amedure, Schmitz left the residence, telephoned 9-1-1, and confessed.

== Criminal trial ==
At trial, defense attorneys argued that Schmitz, who had been diagnosed with manic depression (bipolar disorder) and Graves' disease, was caused to commit homicide by mental illness and humiliation, by way of the "gay panic defense". Schmitz was found guilty of second-degree murder in 1996 and sentenced to 25–50 years in prison, but his conviction was overturned on appeal. Upon retrial, he was found guilty of the same charge once again and his sentence was reinstated. Schmitz was released from prison on August 22, 2017, after being granted parole.

== Civil trial ==
In 1995, Amedure's family filed a negligence lawsuit against The Jenny Jones Show, Telepictures, and Warner Bros. Represented by Geoffrey Fieger, Amedure's family alleged that producers of the show "ambushed" Schmitz through the revelation of a same-sex crush and that they should have known the segment would result in violence. In May 1999, the jury awarded the Amedures $29,332,686. Time Warner's defense attorney later claimed the verdict would cause a "chilling effect" on the industry. However, this judgment was later overturned by the Michigan Court of Appeals in a 2-to-1 decision. The Michigan Supreme Court declined to hear the case. The court held that the producers of The Jenny Jones Show were not liable for Schmitz's subsequent actions, which they deemed "unforeseeable".

== Media coverage ==
The controversy was covered in the first episode of the Netflix series Trial by Media. In 2021, the controversy was covered in season 6 of the series How It Really Happened on the US TV network HLN in an episode titled "The Jenny Jones Show: Fatal Attraction". Also in 2021, the incident and a portion of the unaired The Jenny Jones Show episode was featured on an episode of VICE TV's docuseries Dark Side of the 90s. In 2025, portions of the episode were featured in the ABC docuseries, Dirty Talk: When Daytime Talk Shows Ruled TV.

== See also ==
- List of homicides in Michigan
- Murder of Larry King
