= Shock value =

Potential to provoke a sharp negative reaction

Shock value (also called shock factor) is the potential of an image, text, action, or other form of communication, such as a public execution, to provoke a reaction of shock by eliciting sharp disgust, anger, fear, or similar adverse emotions.

== In advertising ==
Shock advertising or shockvertising is an type of advertising generally regarded as one that "deliberately, rather than inadvertently, startles and offends its audience by violating norms for social values and personal ideals". It is the employment in advertising or public relations of "graphic imagery and blunt slogans to highlight" a public policy issue, goods, or services. Shock advertising is designed principally to break through the advertising "clutter" to capture attention and create buzz, and also to attract an audience to a certain brand or bring awareness to a certain public service issue, health issue, or cause (e.g., urging drivers to use their seatbelts, promoting STD prevention, bringing awareness of racism and other injustices, or discouraging smoking among teens).

The Benetton Group has come under particular scrutiny for the use of shock advertisements in its campaigns, leading to public outrage and consumer complaints. However, several of Benetton's advertisements have also been the subject of much praise for heightening awareness of significant social issues and for "taking a stand" against infringements on human rights, civil liberties, and environmental rights.

Other shocking advertisements released by Benetton include an image of a duck covered in oil (addressing issues of oil spillage and the cleanliness of oceans), a man dying of AIDS, a soldier holding a human bone, as well as a newborn infant still attached to its umbilical cord, which "was intended as an anthem to life, but was one of the most censored visuals in the history of Benetton ads". Oliviero Toscani, a photographer for Benetton who contributed to many of its shocking advertisements, said, regarding the advertisement he created of a man dying from AIDS, that he wanted "to use the forum of poster advertising to make people aware of this [AIDS] tragedy at a time when no-one dared to show AIDS patients".

== In music ==
Shock rock is an umbrella term for artists who combine rock music with elements of theatrical shock value in live performances.

Screamin' Jay Hawkins has been seen as a pioneer for shock rock. After the success of his 1957 hit "I Put a Spell on You", Hawkins began to perform a recurring stunt at many of his live shows; he would emerge from a coffin, sing into a skull-shaped microphone and set off smoke bombs. Other acts include Alice Cooper, Marilyn Manson, Rammstein, Iggy Pop, Kiss, W.A.S.P., Gwar, Twisted Sister, GG Allin, Christian Death, Slipknot, and the Misfits.

Shock value is also popular in hip hop music, and sometimes under the genre of horrorcore. Some notable examples are Eminem, Insane Clown Posse and Tyler, the Creator.

== In art ==
Shock value is also used in the art world either by commenting on real world situations or expressing oneself (ranging from Piss Christ to the 2002 Gaspar Noé art film Irréversible) to the point of criticism and controversy.

== See also ==
- Black comedy
- Exploitation film
- Gross-out film
- Mondo film
- Shock jock
- Shock site
- Internet troll
- Transgressive art
- Cinema of Transgression
- Extreme cinema
- Yellow journalism
- Low culture
- High culture
- Modernism
- Postmodernism
- Censorship
- Not safe for life (NSFL)
