= Jim Paratore =

American television producer (1953–2012)

- Born: James Paratore; August 13, 1953; New Orleans, Louisiana, U.S.
- Died: May 29, 2012 (aged 58); Paris, France
- Education: Loyola University New Orleans
- Occupations: Television producer, television executive
- Known for: The Ellen DeGeneres Show; The Tyra Banks Show; The Rosie O'Donnell Show; The Bachelor; TMZ on TV
- Notable work: Vice president for Domestic TV Distribution at Warner Bros.

James Paratore (August 13, 1953 – May 29, 2012) was an American television producer and longtime Warner Bros executive whose credits included The Ellen DeGeneres Show, The Tyra Banks Show, and The Rosie O'Donnell Show. Paratore co-founded the TMZ web site, and the company ParaMedia in 2005 and its companion television show, TMZ on TV, in 2007.

== Biography ==
=== Early life ===
A native of Louisiana, Paratore earned a bachelor's degree in communications from Loyola University New Orleans.

=== Career ===
Paratore began his career as a programming director for several Florida television stations before joining Telepictures.

Paratore was the president of Warner Bros. Telepictures Productions from 1992 to 2006. He developed Telepictures' slate of daytime syndicated and prime time reality shows, including ABC's The Bachelor. As President of Telepictures, Paratore oversaw the creation of some of the studio's most prominent shows, including The Ellen DeGeneres Show, The Rosie O'Donnell Show Paratore remained the executive producer of The Ellen DeGeneres Show, the syndicated daytime talk show which debuted in 2003, even after departing his Telepictures in 2006.

In 2005, he partnered with Harvey Levin to create the entertainment web site TMZ and its daily television show.

He also served as the vice president of Warner Bros. Domestic Television Distribution from 2002 until his death in 2012.

=== Death ===
Paratore died of a heart attack while bicycling in Paris, France, on May 29, 2012, at the age of 58. He was survived by his wife Jill Wickert, and daughter, Martini Paratore.
