= The Montells =

American garage rock band

- The Montells in 1966

Background information
- Origin: Miami, Florida, United States
- Genres: Garage rock
- Years active: 1963–1967; 2008
- Labels: Blue Saint; Thames
- Past members: Carter Ragsdale; John Weatherford; George Walden; George Hall; Jeff Allen; Gene Murray; Danny Murphy; Don Rickets; Johnny Dalton; Dewey Bond

The Montells were an American garage rock band from Miami, Florida who were active in the 1960s. They briefly operated under the name H.M. Subjects and recorded a version of the Pretty Things's "Don't Bring Me Down," which while in the process of becoming a local hit, became embroiled in a controversy involving Morton Downey, Jr., then a disc jockey at Miami's WFUN and later of talk show fame. The song was criticized for its apparently sexually suggestive lyric and the contention that Downey allegedly took payola for the song, an allegation which was never proven. The band went on to record another single, once again as the Montells, featuring an A-side for which they are remembered, "You Can't Make Me." They broke up in 1967, but reunited for a performance in 2008.

== History ==
=== Origins ===
The Montells began as the Impalas in 1963 and were made of up students from Southwest Senior High School in Miami Florida. In the 1960s, the school served as a major breeding ground for Miami's thriving rock scene and hosted a number of fellow garage bands, such as Evil and the Shaggs, and had earlier been the Alma Mater of Charlie McCoy, who had by then become one of the most in-demand session musicians in Nashville, playing with a number of famous artists including Bob Dylan. The lineup of the Impalas consisted of John Weatherford on rhythm guitar, George Walden on lead guitar, George Hall on bass, and Jeff Allen on drums. They would occasionally bring in Gene Murray as a part-time vocalist. Walden and Weatherford had taken classical guitar lessons and Hall had played bass in the school band. The two would get together and hold rehearsals in the afternoon. Jeff Allen lived in the neighborhood and asked them if he could join. They told him that he could under the condition that he by a drum kit. Allen purchased a drum kit that had the logo of another band "the Impalas" printed on it, so they just decided to use the name Impalas. The band played for about a year as a largely instrumental surf group, often playing at parties. Eventually the group was threatened with a lawsuit over their use of the name "the Impalas," so they re-christened themselves as the Montells. According to Carter Ragsdale, "...on the way to get the bass drum painted we passed a dance studio called the House of Montell. We thought that would be a good name so we became the Montells." In 1964 the Montells enlisted Carter Ragsdale to be their lead singer, who was recommended by Gene Murray who was departing. The band would increasingly tailor their sound to fit the kind of hard rocking, blues-based approach of British bands such as the Rolling Stones and the Animals." Drummer Jeff Allen, later to play with Evil, would make occasional trips with this family to England and when there would check out many of the hottest bands such as the Fairies, Downliners Sect, and the Pretty Things, and upon his returns would bring back records and share his observations with fellow bandmates.

=== H. M. Subjects and controversy ===
In May 1965, the Montells went to Dukoff Recording Studios in Miami to record several songs, amongst which "Don't Bring Me Down" previously recorded by British group the Pretty Things, would be featured on their first single released on Blue Saint Records. Upon the release of this record and in live performances around this time, the Montells temporarily operated under the name H.M. Subjects (short for "Her Majesty's Subjects"), at the request of a disc jockey at the local radio station, WFUN, who wanted them to adopt a name that would appeal to fans of British Invasion groups such as the Beatles and the Rolling Stones.

The DJ was Morton Downey Jr., later of national television talk show fame, who was known in Miami at the time as "'Doc' Downey" (or sometimes "the Liverpool Loudmouth"), and was a transplant who had originally worked at WONE in Dayton Ohio, and later at KDEO in San Diego, and had been involved in the music industry, at times as a musical act himself, or in production and A&R, such as with his brief stint at Magic Lamp Records in Los Angeles, where he had been involved with surf rock records by the Chantays and the Surfaris. At the time it was not uncommon for deejays to host dances, and guitarist George Walden and drummer Jeff Allen would frequently visit WFUN and got to know the staff there. The lyrics of H.M. Subjects' version of the song were somewhat improvised by vocalist Ragsdale and contained sexually suggestive lines such as "and when I laid her on the ground." After hearing an acetate of "Don't Let Me Down," the opportunistic Downey quickly realized the potential to create a publicity scandal. He became involved with the release of the record and the band's promotion. The record became a local hit climbing up the Miami charts to #5.

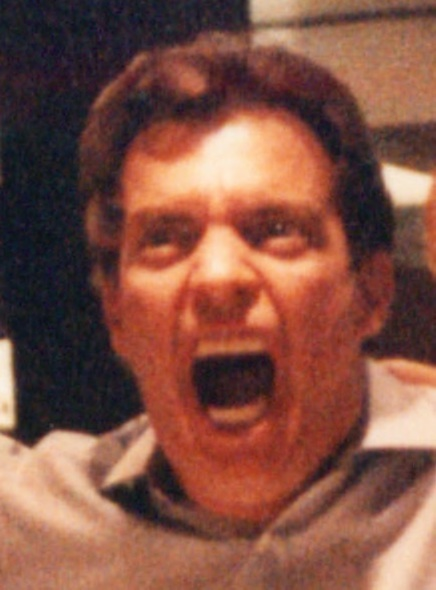
While at WFUN in Miami, disc jockey Morton Downey Jr. created a local publicity scandal to promote the single "Don't Let Me Down." Downey went on to become a well-known television personality years later with The Morton Downey Jr. Show.

Just as soon as the record was ascending to the top of charts, it became engulfed in controversy, as parents objected to the song's sexual connotations, declaring it a "dirty record" and tried to have it banned. A censored version was released with the word "laid" replaced by a tone-generated beep, but it failed to quell the controversy, perhaps making the negative reaction even worse by inadvertently drawing even more attention to the suggestiveness of the lyric, especially when played on the radio, where listeners could complete the ad lib for themselves, sometimes in ceremonious fashion. Some have even speculated that the censor beeps were inserted by Downey himself. While Downey succeeded in creating the scandal he craved, he became the center of another, but less amenable, controversy. It was reported that he had a financial interest in all of the records he had played at WFUN, receiving a one cent proceed from every disc sold, and the H.M. Subjects' record came under the lion's share of the scrutiny. WFUN conducted an investigation into the allegations, but could not come up with sufficient evidence, so Downey returned to his Monday slot. Downey, nonetheless, became involved this time in a scandal involving an acrimonious situation involving the top deejay at rival station WQAM. WFUN was now concerned that their F.C.C. license might revoked. To placate the stations' concerns and avoid termination, Downey suspended sale of the H.M. Subjects' record, effectively letting it die in the charts. However, the scandal involving his actions towards the deejay at WQAM resulted in Downey's eventual firing at WFUN. According to music writer Jeff Lemlich:

If there were any real losers in this battle royale, no doubt it was our boys from Southwest High. First, the Montells were deprived of a number one hit when copies of "Don't Let Me Down" were left to waste away in the warehouse. Their planned second release through Downey, Van Morrison's "Gloria" was also put on hold.

=== Continued recording and activity as the Montells ===
The band returned to using their former name, the Montells, and remained a popular local act, continuing to play dances and armories and enjoyed a regional following, traveling to Gainesville to play at the University of Florida, playing in venues such as a club in Winter Haven owned by Gram Parsons' father and Daytona's Surf Club. In 1965, Danny Murphy replaced George Hall on bass and would also contribute lead and backing vocals as well as occasional guitar to the band's arrangements. In 1966 Don Ricketts, who had played in fellow Miami band the Modds would briefly join the group as a second bass player to provide additional support when Murphy was on guitar. The band went into the studio to record what has become perhaps their best known song, "You Can't Make Me," backed with an Otis Blackwell penned chestnut, "Daddy Rolling Stone," previously covered by the Who and released on the Themes label in May 1966. That year drummer Jeff Allen left to join Evil and was replaced by Ted Napoleon." In 1967 lead singer Carter Ragsdale was drafted into the army during the Vietnam War. Former bassist George Hall also served time in Vietnam, as well as John Mascaro of fellow Miami band the Modds. The Montells broke up in 1967.

=== Later developments ===
Carter Ragsdale and Steve Chase briefly started a group named Carter's Pills with Ragsdale on vocals, Chase on guitar, and Billy Demoya on organ, playing at venues such as the Armory and the Place in North Miami. Later Ragsdale would follow his father's footsteps as a horse trainer. The Montells re-united briefly with three of their 1960s members, Ragsdale, Weatherford, and Hall, augmented by Johnny Dalton, previously of Evil, on guitar and for Dewey Bond, formerly in the Modds, on drums for a Miami appearance at Geezerpalooza in 2008.

In the intervening years following their breakup, the Montells' work has come to the attention of garage rock collectors and enthusiasts. In 2002, Corduroy Records released a split album featuring the work of both the Montells and Evil entitled, The Montells/ Evil. The song, "You Can't Make Me" is included on the 1984 Back from the Grave, Volume 3 LP, put out by Crypt Records.

== Membership ==
=== 1963–1964 (as the Impalas) ===
- John Weatherford (rhythm guitar)
- George Walden (lead guitar)
- George Hall (bass)
- Jeff Allen (drums)
- Gene Murray (occasional vocals)

=== 1964–1965 (as the Montells and H.M. Subjects) ===
- Carter Ragsdale (lead vocals)
- John Weatherford (rhythm guitar)
- George Walden (lead guitar)
- George Hall (bass)
- Jeff Allen (drums)

=== 1965–1966 ===
- Carter Ragsdale (lead vocals)
- John Weatherford (rhythm guitar)
- George Walden (lead guitar)
- Danny Murphy (bass, guitar)
- Don Rickets (bass)
- Jeff Allen (drums)

=== 2008 reunion ===
- Carter Ragsdale (lead vocals)
- John Weatherford (rhythm guitar)
- Johnny Dalton (guitar)
- George Hall (bass)
- Dewey Bond (drums)

== Discography ==
- "Don't Bring Me Down" (part 1) b/w "Don't Bring Me Down" (part 2) (as H.M. Subjects) (Blue Saint 1001, June 1965)
- "You Can't Make Me" b/w "Daddy Rolling Stone" (Thames 102, May 1966)
