= Steampipe Alley =

American children's television program

- Starring: Mario Cantone

Original release
- Network: WWOR-TV
- Release: 1988 – 1993

Steampipe Alley is a children's television program that aired on WWOR from 1988 to 1993. The program was hosted by comedian Mario Cantone, with announcing duties handled by longtime station staff announcer Ted Mallie (referred to on-air by Cantone as "Don Pardonmeo", a play on the name of another veteran announcer, Don Pardo). It was a very popular show that gave big ratings for the WWOR EMI Service, despite being a local show for all of its run. The show was taped at 9 Broadcast Plaza, the WWOR headquarters, in Secaucus, where The Morton Downey Jr. Show and The Richard Bey Show were also taped.

Each episode featured celebrity guests (often encountering other WWOR personalities), recurring segments, comedy sketches and games for its young audience members, with old Looney Tunes and Max Fleischer cartoons rounding out the program.

The series was written by Judy Katschke (who also served as producer), with Rick Derman as senior producer. Its director was Neil Borrell, who served in the same capacity on the station's local newscasts from the mid-1970s until 2005.

== Characters ==
Playing up his comedic persona, Cantone would portray a variety of characters, including:

- Julia Children, a parody of TV chef Julia Child, who gave recipes for snacks that kids could make at home.
- Joe Rivers, supposedly the brother of comedian Joan Rivers.
- Poochano Pavarachi, a parody of Italian tenor Luciano Pavarotti, who sang about his bean-induced flatulence problem and presided over the Out of Gas segment (see below).
- Ciao Aldo, who appeared in mock commercials to promote a line of fragrances that smelled like pasta.
- Ted Ringer, a stereotypically shady used car salesman who appeared in mock commercials delivering a pitch for the deals available on his "Used and Abused Car Lot".
- Frankie D, a parody of Frank Sinatra, who was a teacher that gave lessons to his "class" via song.
- Richie Morales, a neighborhood kid who appeared in the "Something to Think About" segment (see below).
- Sammy Sammy Jr., a parody of Sammy Davis Jr. who presided over the "Eye In the Pie" segment (see below).
- Rex Can Read, a parody of film critic Rex Reed, who co-hosted the "At the Alley" segment (see below).
- Angelo Antonelli, a stereotypical Italian-American sewer worker who presided over the "Three Sewer Monte" segment (see below).

== Recurring segments ==
A wide variety of games and sketches were featured, including:

- Three Sewer Monte - Angelo Antonelli (who always pronounced the "three" in the game's title as "tree") chose a member of the audience to pull the string on one of three pipes hanging overhead. If the right one was chosen, it was worth a prize; otherwise, the audience member would have "spiders primavera" (a mix of rubber spiders and spaghetti) dumped on their head.
- The Dream Date Game - A parody of The Dating Game, in which a bachelorette asked questions of three potential bachelors (one of whom was always Cantone in disguise).
- Where In the World? - Kids attempted to identify world landmarks to win prizes.
- Steampipe Theatre - Cantone (as "Cecil B. DeMario") would serve as acting coach to a group of kids as they attempted to re-enact scenes from a well known film or play.
- Cream the Teach - Two kids from a local school were given 30 seconds to throw pies at one of their teachers (whose head was stuck through a prop wall); if they managed to land one directly in the teacher's face, they won a prize for their school.
- Something to Think About - In one of the show's few semi-serious segments, neighborhood kid Richie Morales would relate a story to the audience, typically involving himself and his friends, intended to offer genuine advice on handling real-life situations.
- Eye In the Pie - A kid contestant was given 30 seconds to find Sammy Sammy Jr's glass eye inside a pie in order to win a prize. For the show's Thanksgiving episodes, this segment became Eye In the Stuffing, with the search taking place inside a bowl of stuffing.
- Out of Gas - Italian tenor Poochano Pavarachi would lead a group of kids in a flatulence-themed Musical chairs variant, where all the chairs were equipped with whoopee cushions; the sole survivor would win a prize.
- The National Gallery of Excuses - Cantone would read various excuses for childhood offenses (not finishing homework, etc.), as sent in by home viewers; those whose excuses were read on-air received a prize.
- At the Alley - A takeoff of TV's At the Movies, snooty critic Rex Can Read would offer a scathing review of a well-known nursery rhyme or fairy tale, which was typically at odds with that of his more agreeable fellow critic, young Bill Getsharassed (a parody of Bill Harris).
- Mystery Guest - Based on the long-running panel game What's My Line?, a blindfolded panel of three audience members attempted to guess the identity of a celebrity by asking "yes" or "no" questions, with each kid allowed to keep asking questions until getting a "no" answer or successfully identifying the guest; doing so was worth a prize. Among the Mystery Guests who appeared in this segment were Morris the Cat, Brice Beckham, and fellow WWOR host Morton Downey Jr.
- Brain Drain - The last segment of each show; inspired by the popular kids' game show Double Dare, two kids competed in a rapid-fire 60-second question round, and the player with the high score won a prize and went on to run an obstacle course for the chance at the day's grand prize.
