= Mario Cantone =

American comedian, writer, singer and actor (born 1959)

- Cantone in 2026
- Born: December 9, 1959 (age 66); Stoneham, Massachusetts, U.S.
- Notable work: Anthony Marentino on Sex and the City
- Spouse: Jerry Dixon (m. 2011)

Comedy career
- Years active: 1987–present
- Medium: Stand-up, television, film, theatre
- Genres: Character comedy, observational comedy, physical comedy
- Subjects: Everyday life, family, celebrities, stereotypes, Italian culture, LGBT culture
- Website: www.mariocantone.com

Mario Cantone (born December 9, 1959) is an American comedian, writer, actor, singer, and television host widely known for his role as Anthony Marentino in Sex and the City (2000–2004), its revival And Just Like That... (2021–2025) and Terri in Men in Trees (2006–2008). He hosted the children's television program Steampipe Alley, which aired on WWOR-TV from 1988 to 1993.

== Early life ==
Cantone was born in Massachusetts, and raised in Stoneham, where his Italian-American family moved when he was two. He was the fourth of five children of Mario Sr., a Boston restaurant owner, and his wife, Elizabeth (née Pescione). His father moved the family to Stoneham, according to Cantone in a 2004 New York Times interview to get her away from her bookie relatives. Cantone said the problem "was that she was not only a bookie but she was also a compulsive gambler." His mother, who had been a big band singer in her youth, died when he was 21.

As a child, Cantone would direct reenactments of shows. Cantone's first impression was of Julia Child, which he presented in a junior high school talent show. He graduated from Stoneham High School in 1978 and Emerson College in 1982. He befriended fellow comic Denis Leary at Emerson. He moved to New York City in 1983 and got a job as a chocolate vendor at Trump Tower.

== Early career ==
While working at Trump Tower, he did impressions of people while selling chocolate truffles. He later worked as a jewelry salesman, quitting a year later to pursue comedy full time. He began his professional career hosting a children's show called Steampipe Alley, which aired on New York-New Jersey superstation WWOR-TV from 1988 to 1993.

== Stand-up career ==
In his stand-up concerts, he is known for his occasionally campy impressions of entertainment personalities such as Liza Minnelli, Judy Garland, Bruce Springsteen, Jim Morrison, and Bette Davis as well as for his original songs.

Much of his comedy derives from his boisterous Italian-American family. Cantone, who is gay, has said that he considers himself an actor and comedian who happens to be gay rather than a gay comic relying on gay jokes. "Talking about being gay is a very small part of my show and when I first started I wasn't out on stage but I was out off stage, I certainly didn't lie about it on stage but if you didn't know you were an idiot and you lived in a cave after seeing me...really??"

== Acting career ==
=== Sex and the City ===
Cantone is known for his role in the HBO series Sex and the City as Anthony Marentino, Charlotte York's gay wedding planner who dispensed advice with a rapid fire delivery.

=== Broadway ===
Cantone made his Broadway debut in 1995, replacing Nathan Lane in the role of Buzz in Terrence McNally's Tony Award–winning play, Love! Valour! Compassion! Later that year, he appeared in the revival of The Tempest with Patrick Stewart. Several years later, Cantone did a workshop for The Lion King as Timon but was not comfortable with the makeup or manipulating a puppet and eventually left the project. In 2002, he created and wrote his own one-man show for Broadway, An Evening With Mario Cantone. A year later, Cantone starred as Gidger in Richard Greenberg's The Violet Hour in a part written specifically for him. The Violet Hour received mixed reviews and closed after 54 performances.

In 2004, Cantone appeared as Samuel Byck in Stephen Sondheim's musical Assassins. Originally slated for the 2001 Broadway season, Assassins was postponed because of the September 11, 2001 attacks. In 2001, Cantone had turned down the role of Carmen Ghia in Mel Brooks's The Producers. His other Broadway credits include his second one-man show, Laugh Whore, which ran from October 24, 2004, to January 2, 2005, at the Cort Theatre. Laugh Whore received a Tony Award nomination for Best Special Theatrical Event and an Outer Critics Circle award nomination for Outstanding Solo Performance. Showtime taped the December 11, 2004 performance, which premiered on May 28, 2005. It was the network's first Broadway production to air as a comedy special.

In September 2010, Cantone appeared in a staged reading of the Charles Messina play A Room of My Own at The Theatre at 45 Bleecker Street in Greenwich Village. As of November 2012, the play was still in development with Cantone in the cast. The Off-Broadway production was expected to begin previews in February 2016.

=== Other works ===
He started his career as the host of children's show, Steampipe Alley, which aired in the late 1980s through 1993.

He has appeared in the Comedy Central roasts of Joan Rivers and fellow Boston-area native and Emerson College alumnus Denis Leary. The network's Chappelle's Show featured him in a segment called "Ask A Gay Dude."

His voice-over work includes Sunsilk "hairapy" advertisements, and the voice of talent scout Mikey Abromowitz in the 2007 animated movie Surf's Up. He was a frequent guest on the Opie and Anthony radio show.

He was a regular guest on the ABC daytime talk show The View since at least 2003 and became a guest co-host in 2005. In August 2013, he was in the news as a rumored replacement for retiring co-host Joy Behar and since 2014 has been co-hosting more frequently.

Cantone was among the judges of the Miss America 2014 pageant. He has appeared several times on The $100,000 Pyramid and Match Game as a celebrity guest star.

In 2022, Cantone competed in season eight of The Masked Singer as "Maize". He was eliminated on "Andrew Lloyd Webber Night" alongside Gloria Gaynor as "Mermaid".

In 2025, Cantone reprised his role as Anthony Marentino for a pop-up 'Hot Fellas' event at a Manhattan bakery, noting that rolling croissants came naturally to him.

== Personal life ==
In October 2011, Cantone married his partner of 20 years, musical theater director Jerry Dixon. The ceremony was officiated by pastor Jay Bakker. They live in Chelsea, Manhattan, New York City.

== Filmography ==
=== Film ===
Year	Title	Role	Director	Ref.
1994	Quiz Show	Passerby	Robert Redford	
1994	Who Do I Gotta Kill?	Rico	Frank Rainone / James Lorinz / Rocco Simonelli	
1997	MouseHunt	Zeppco Suit No. 1	Gore Verbinski	
2002	Pandora	Tech Support	Antonio Campos	
2002	And She Was	Mario	Frank Rainone	
2003	Happy Hour	Geoffrey	Mike Bencivenga	
2003	Crooked Lines	Cliff	Harry O'Reilly	
2005	Searching for Bobby D	Casting Director	Paul Borghese	
2005	The Aristocrats	Himself	Penn Jillette / Paul Provenza	
2006	Farce of the Penguins	Sidney (voice)	Bob Saget	
2006	Last Request	Mr. Oliver	John DeBellis	
2007	Three Days to Vegas	Chris	Charlie Picerni	
2007	Staten Island	Mr. Burton	James DeMonaco	
2007	Surf's Up	Mikey Abromowitz (voice)	Ash Brannon and Chris Buck	
2008	Sex and the City	Anthony Marentino	Michael Patrick King	
2010	Sex and the City 2	Anthony Marentino	Michael Patrick King	
2010	Circus Maximus	Romano	Thomas J. La Sorsa.	
2011	Goldberg - P.I.	Bartender	Steven Moskovic and Rosario Roveto Jr.	
2011	Dirty Movie	The Director	Jerry Daigle / Christopher Meloni	
2015	In Stereo	John Resnick	Mel Rodriguez III	
2017	A Very Merry Toy Store	Mayor Stevens		
2019	Otherhood	Calvin	Cindy Chupack	
2020	All My Life	Jerome Patterson	Marc Meyers	
2023	Under the Boardwalk	Mr. Cacciatore (voice)	David Soren	

=== Television ===
Year	Title	Role	Notes
1988–1993	Steampipe Alley	Various	
1994	NYPD Blue	Bidder No. 1	Episode: "Rockin' Robin" (S 1:Ep 22)
2001	Ed	Scott Hayes	Episode: "Mixed Signals" (S 1:Ep 21)
2003	Chappelle's Show	Himself	Season 1 Episode 6
2000–2004	Sex and the City	Anthony Marentino	Recurring role
2004	Mouthing Off: 51 Greatest Smartasses	Himself	Comedy special
2005	Laugh Whore	Himself	Comedy special
2006–2008	Men in Trees	Terri Romano	Recurring role
2009	Killer Hair	Leonardo	TV movie
2009	Hostile Makeover	Leonardo	TV movie
2011	A Mann's World	Nicky	TV movie
2014	Toadalees	Filth, Flarn & Gee	TV animated film directed by Ryan Duff
2015	Hindsight	Simon	Episodes: "Pilot" and "Square One"
2016	The $100,000 Pyramid	Himself (celebrity guest)	Episode: Mario Cantone vs. Robin Roberts
2017	Match Game	Himself (celebrity guest)	Season 1, Episodes 6-7; Season 2, Episode 6
2017	The President Show	Anthony Scaramucci	2 episodes
2019	Mom	Sean	Episode: "Wile E. Coyote and a Possessed Doll"
2020	AJ and the Queen	Alma Joy	Episode: "Pittsburgh"
2020–2022	Better Things	Mal Martone	4 episodes
2021–2025	And Just Like That...	Anthony Marentino	Main role
2022	Girls5eva	Mario Cantone	Episode: "B.P.E."
2022	The Masked Singer	Maize	Season 8 contestant; Episode: "Andrew Lloyd Weber Night"
2023	Pal's Missing School!	Chuck E. Cheese (voice)	CEC Film. Replacing Jaret Reddick
2023	The $100,000 Pyramid	Self - Celebrity Player	Episode: "Deon Cole vs D'arcy Carden and Ken Jennings vs Mario Cantone"
