= Dukoff =

Dukoff is a surname and may refer to:

- Bobby Dukoff (1918–2012), American Big Band tenor saxophonist, audio engineer and mouthpiece maker
- Lauren Dukoff (born 1984), American photographer, noted for her portraiture and documentary work of celebrities and musicians
