= Richard Bey =

American talk show host

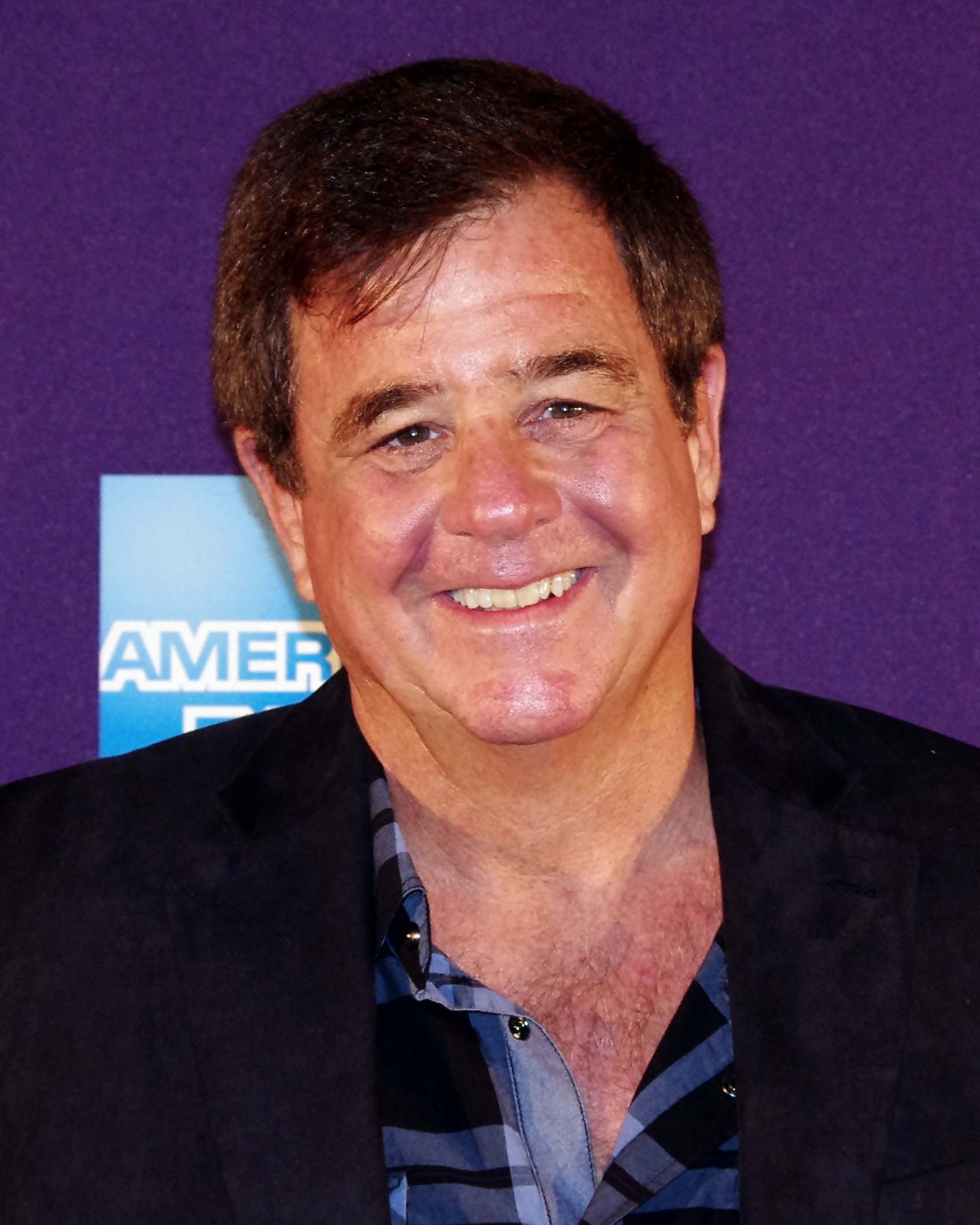
- Bey at the 2012 Tribeca Film Festival premiere of Évocateur: The Morton Downey Jr. Movie
- Born: Richard Wayne Bey; July 22, 1951 (age 75); Queens, New York City, U.S.
- Education: University of California, Santa Barbara (B.A.); Yale School of Drama (M.A., 1976)
- Occupations: Talk show host, TV and radio personality

Richard Wayne Bey (born July 22, 1951) is an American talk show host. He was popular in the 1990s as host of The Richard Bey Show, a daytime talk show containing ordinary people's personal stories incorporated into entertaining competitive games. The show was one of the first to pioneer the controversial genre of trash TV, and contained the hard R-rated content that would typify the genre.

== Early years ==
Bey was born in Far Rockaway, Queens, New York, to a Jewish father and an Irish Catholic mother and attended Far Rockaway High School.

He is an alumnus of the University of California, Santa Barbara and the Yale School of Drama.

Prior to The Richard Bey Show, Bey hosted People Are Talking, telecast in New York City and Philadelphia (in Philadelphia it aired on KYW, at the time, an NBC affiliate), and 2 On the Town for WCBS. People Are Talking was a one-hour live broadcast covering topical news issues and one on one interviews with guests like Frank Zappa, Steven Spielberg, President Jimmy Carter, Sammy Davis Jr., Patricia Neal, Alexander Haig, Jerry Brown, Ross Perot and Martin and Charlie Sheen. The show was called 9 Broadcast Plaza in its early years before changing its name to The Richard Bey Show.

Among his roles on stage are Hamlet (title role) As You Like It, Twelfth Night, Troilus and Cressida as well as the world premieres of new plays by Richard Nelson, Chris Durang and Jim Lapine. He was a company member of the Yale Repertory Theater and understudied the National Theatre of Great Britain on Broadway and at the Kennedy Center. His film roles include Sacha Baron Cohen's Brüno, Évocateur, Meet Wally Sparks and George Washington.

== People Are Talking, 9 Broadcast Plaza, and The Richard Bey Show ==
The Richard Bey Show (1992–1996) was produced from WWOR in Secaucus, New Jersey and later syndicated across the country by All American Television (known today as FreemantleMedia). The show originated as a combination of two hit shows which were very equally popular, People Are Talking, which was the first form of Bey, which was a true talk show that was serious and sometimes confrontational, similar to The Morton Downey Jr. Show. It was nationally syndicated, but was produced by KYW. The show sometimes got confrontational, and it set the seeds for what would become his show, in 1992. Eventually, sometime in the late 80s, the show merged with 9 Broadcast Plaza, and became a WWOR/MCA-TV production. 9BP, which Bey also occasionally would host, when Matt Lauer, the show's original host, would be absent or doing his assignment for his other show, Beyond the Screen (a major popular behind-the-scenes show that made Cinemax, its network, topple HBO in views) was a combination of entertainment, that incorporated the local news (sometimes Lauer and Bey would talk to Reg Wells, Rolland Smith, Brenda Blackmon, on select telecasts, telesync), setting the stage for the likes of Stephen Colbert, and many others. On 9BP, major elites from many countries, international superstars, and celebrities, were interviewed, hence making Beyond the Screen similar to this. There would be high-line cuisine displays, and fun activities on the more family-friendly episodes, such as a pizza-making contest, when Sara Lee Kessler occasionally hosted. Bey eventually took over duties of the show, and the seeds of The Richard Bey Show were set. The shows got more adult-oriented (meaning TV-MA/hard R), although without the fights, abundant graphic language, sexually explicit content that ended up on Bey. Both programs would be 18-rating by European standards.

From 1992 and on, as The Richard Bey Show, the staples of trash TV became officially commonplace. The show had hard R/TV-MA-DLSV (18 by European standards) content - violence in the form of fights, some of which were graphic, graphic language, graphic sexual content. The show featured such competitive events as the "Miss Big Butt" contest, the "Mr. Puniverse" contest, "Country Drag Queens versus City Drag Queens", "Dysfunctional Family Feud" and "Blacks who think O.J. is guilty vs. Whites who think he is innocent". Young women who were guests on the show were sometimes placed in a spoof of The Dating Game in which the guest interviewed three hidden "bachelors", all of whom were an obvious mismatch for the "bachelorette", e.g., a drag queen or a dwarf. The show was one of the first to set the stage for trash TV, featuring hard R content such as graphic language, graphic sex, drug references, as well as fights, sometimes to the point of getting bloody. For a time, his show was considered the most graphic of the TV talk shows, only to be tied with The Jerry Springer Show after 1996, which is when Bey's show ended.

Bey's show made frequent use of sound effects like "uh-duh" for an insane response, "I've been framed" for a guest proclaiming innocence and "You're busted!" for one accused of wrongdoing. Bey often exclaimed, "Where do they find these people?!" in the presence of unbelievable guests or audience members. During some shows, there would be a secret word ("Bey's Phrase That Pays"). If an audience member used it in a comment, he would receive $100, an homage to a prior talk and game show, You Bet Your Life. A joking suggestion was then made on how to spend it: "Lobster dinner tonight!"; in addition, he had other sound effects, such as "Shut up." Richard also famously lost his temper in a 1994 episode involving strippers, and had a guest named Jerry Saunders who criticized his opponents. Sometimes the content was uncensored, and Bey says "dick" (in the vulgar sense) in one episode, to poke fun at his name, for jokes.

The show was a precursor to reality television, featuring a variety of games incorporating guests' stories, most notoriously "The Wheel of Torture", in which a guest would be strapped to a spinning wheel while a spouse or lover poured slime on them as punishment for a misdeed. The show was executive produced by Bob Woodruff and David Sittenfeld.

Richard would frequently make fun of Jerry Springer on his show, as when he lost his contact lenses and was forced to wear eyeglasses, remarking, "Don't worry, you're not watching Jerry Springer" and showing Jerry in his "Bad Neighbors" segment, a reference to Springer's show being the lead-in or lead-out to Bey on many stations in the early-to-mid 1990s. He also made light of Ricki Lake, Rosie O'Donnell, Phil Donahue, and Oprah Winfrey's shows. He also incorporated a lot of humor. One famous episode of his show under the title 9BP, was a controversial one dealing with Communism and had guest panels arguing.

Bey also hosted a prime time show called "Night Games". It was short-lived but ran around the time his daytime show was at its peak. It ran after 10 o'clock and was equally ribald with sexually clad women engaged in contests.

Bey claimed his TV show was canceled in December 1996, despite the high ratings it maintained, as a direct result of doing a program with Gennifer Flowers, discussing her sexual relationship with then President Bill Clinton.

A scene from the 2009 film Brüno depicts the filming of an episode of a fictional variation on the show called Today with Richard Bey. The production team, along with Bey, set up the program to invite an unsuspecting audience to participate in a segment where Brüno (Sacha Baron Cohen) appears as a guest, talking about his Black adopted son. In response to questions from the audience, Brüno reveals that he gave his son the "traditional African name" O.J. and claims that he "swapped" an iPod for his son. The predominantly Black audience becomes outraged over Brüno's responses.

A scene from the 1996 (season 9, episode 16) Married... with Children has Steve Rhodes asking his ex-wife Marcy if her new husband is at home watching Richard Bey.

== Radio years ==
After the TV show was canceled, Bey was an evening and later afternoon radio co-host along with Steve Malzberg on The Buzz, which aired on New York's WABC from 2000 to 2003.

According to the New York Post, he was one of only two talk hosts at the time on commercial New York radio to openly oppose the Iraq War, contesting the WMD evidence. He has since hosted on Sirius Satellite Radio, The Bill Press Show, and for the syndicated The Wall Street Journal: This Morning.

Bey hosted for a week on WXRK 92.3 FM from February 5 to February 9, 2007, from 10:00 pm to midnight. He regularly filled in for Lynn Samuels and Alex Bennett on the Sirius Satellite Radio channel Talk Left when they went on vacation or took a day off.

In August 2007, Bey began hosting a new show on WWRL in New York City from 8 to 10 pm. In November 2007, he was teamed up with Mark Riley and moved to the morning drive, replacing the team of Sam Greenfield and Armstrong Williams.

In March 2008, family reasons caused Mark Riley to leave WWRL by mutual agreement to return to WLIB, and Richard was teamed up with longtime broadcaster Coz Carson. Bey later decided to leave WWRL himself, citing personal reasons (namely spending time with his son).

Until December 2009, he appeared daily on internet TV station UBA-TV from noon until 1:00 pm. Until 2019, he filled in on Sirius Left and hosted a blog on his now defunct website. In December 2013 he hosted the morning show in the final weeks of WWRL before it switched to Spanish language broadcasting.

== Personal life ==
As of 2009, Bey had never been married. He lives in Midtown Manhattan in New York City.
