= The Richard Bey Show =

American television talk show

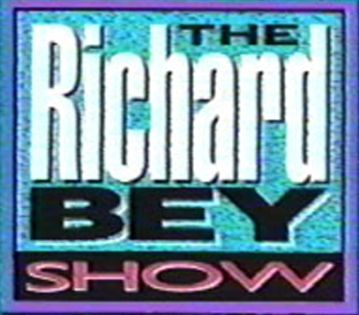
- Genre: Talk show
- Created by: Richard Bey
- Presented by: Richard Bey
- Country of origin: United States

Production
- Running time: 60 minutes
- Production companies: WWOR (1989–1992); All American Television (1995–1996); Chris-Craft Television (1992–1996); UPN (1995–1996)

Original release
- Network: WWOR
- Release: September 18, 1989 – 1995
- Network: Syndication
- Release: 1989 – December 27, 1996

The Richard Bey Show was a syndicated American tabloid talk show hosted by Richard Bey which aired from September 28, 1992 to December 27, 1996, originally produced from and aired on WWOR (channel 9) in New York. It was a continuation of Nine Broadcast Plaza (9BP) which began airing on September 18, 1989 and was initially cohosted by Bey with Matt Lauer before Bey gradually took the reins.

Nine Broadcast Plaza was considered the first show of its kind worldwide where it touched on racy topics on-air, essentially a precursor of and helping to pioneer trash TV. After renaming as The Richard Bey Show, it became further risqué and featured outrageous content such as fights, graphic language, graphic sexual content, and drug references, while deliberately pushing the humorous aspect. Bey himself described it as a "parody of talk shows".

The show was nationally syndicated by All American Television from January 2, 1995 to December 27, 1996 (almost exclusively on UPN stations, due to Chris-Craft Television being the show's distributor). Its executive producers were Bob Woodruff and David Sittenfeld.

== History ==
Richard Bey had previously hosted another more serious talk show during the 1980s, an NBC/Chris-Craft/Fox station staple named People Are Talking on KYW-TV in Philadelphia. It was a fairly confrontational show similar to The Morton Downey Jr. Show. He replaced previous host Maury Povich who departed in 1983. Bey left the station in the spring of 1987. Nine Broadcast Plaza was launched in 1989 with Matt Lauer as presenter and Bey sitting in. The pair would talk to major celebrities and often, many high elite celebrities, and even government officials of Nuyorican lands, Italy and France, would appear on such shows. Lauer would have high-cuisine events, and one episode had Sara Lee Kessler hosting a pizza making telethon, with a youth, probably of Steampipe Alley, another major WWOR show. Bey would do the same, although his show was more a talk show. Eventually the seeds of The Richard Bey Show were planted in 1990. Many outlets were already calling the show that name even before the official renaming in 1992 by that time.

PAT and 9BP were both innovative: they, when PAT became a WWOR/MCA-TV-produced show were one of the first to incorporate entertainment with the local news, and would have even have the news be debated in a panel. Morton Downey Jr, in one episode appeared, and talked with Bey, about Howard Stern's abuses to one of his guest - abuses which the whole WWOR crew was very upset about. This set the stage for later political comedy, such as that of Stephen Colbert and was an influence on The Colbert Report, on Comedy Central. Many episodes of 9BP, as well as People are Talking when it became a WWOR/MCA-TV production sometime in the late 80s, incorporate syncs of the local news. This definitely happened in 1989, with the premiere of News at Noon, a more informal variant of Channel 9 News at 10 (1987 - 1995), which was the predecessor to UPN 9 news at 10 (1995 - 2006), in which Kessler was the main anchor. And in many cases she would talk to Bey and Lauer via a telesync. This also happened on 9BP and PAT as well. Lauer was fired after he refused to do live commercials on 9BP.

== Format ==
As The Richard Bey Show, the series frequently and deliberately played up the humorous aspects of the tabloid talk show format, bordering on a full-out variety show with its unusual features. It featured such competitive events as the "Miss Big Butt" contest, the "Mr. Puniverse" contest, "Country Drag Queens versus City Drag Queens", "Dysfunctional Family Feud" and "Blacks who think O.J. is guilty vs. Whites who think he is innocent." Young women who were guests on the show were sometimes placed in a spoof of The Dating Game in which the guest interviewed three hidden "bachelors", all of whom were an obvious mismatch for the "bachelorette", e.g., a drag queen or a dwarf. The show also became a more seriously hardened talk show with nasty fights, sexual content, graphic language (and graphic humor) as time progressed. Bey's show made frequent use of sound effects like "uh-duh" for an insane response, "I've been framed" for a guest proclaiming innocence and "You're busted!" for one accused of wrongdoing. Bey would often exclaim "Where do they find these people?!" in the presence of unbelievable guests or audience members. During some shows, there would be a secret word. If an audience member used it in a comment, he would receive $100, a homage to a prior talk and game show, You Bet Your Life. A joking suggestion was then made on how to spend it: "Lobster dinner tonight!" The show was a precursor to reality television, featuring a variety of games incorporating guests' stories, most notoriously "The Wheel of Torture", in which a guest would be strapped to a spinning wheel while a spouse or lover poured slime on them as punishment for a misdeed.

Richard would frequently make fun of Jerry Springer on his show, as when he lost his contact lenses and was forced to wear eyeglasses, remarking, "Don't worry, you're not watching Jerry Springer" and showing Jerry in his "Bad Neighbors" segment, a reference to Springer's show being the lead-in or lead-out to Bey on many stations in the early-to-mid-1990s. Springer defended himself in 2019 by noting that during the run of his own show, he "wasn't in fights involving Jell-O." He also made light of Ricki Lake, Rosie O'Donnell, Geraldo Rivera, Sally Jesse Raphael, Phil Donahue, and Oprah Winfrey's shows.

== Production ==
The show was taped at 9 Broadcast Plaza, which is the WWOR facility, in Secaucus, New Jersey, for which the show's original name came from. This major complex held every WWOR show as well as WWOR news (pre-, during and post-UPN). The show's set evolved throughout the show's run years. As 9BP (9 Broadcast Plaza) the show had a more beige color. The show's logo was a homage to the change of meanings for pyramids at the time, as it became a symbol of cyborg and cybernetic research. It was a pyramid with the show's title in Futura Condensed Extra Bold. As WWOR's official renaming of the show to The Richard Bey Show approached, the show's set got more colorful and the stage initially looked like a metal concert stage. Eventually the set became a mix of Lavender and pink for the rest of the show's run.

== Reception ==
Howard Rosenberg in a December 1992 entry described the show "Not middle brow, not low brow, but no brow", referencing the “Big Butt Contest” episode as a typical example.

== Cancelation ==
Bey claimed his TV show was canceled in December 1996 not due to ratings, but as a direct result of doing a program the previous day with Gennifer Flowers, discussing her sexual relationship with then-President Bill Clinton. However, in a report by the New York Daily News from approximately a month before the show was cancelled outright, Bey had been losing significant ground in the ratings and his show had already been dropped by nineteen of the stations that were airing it. Bey claimed that the show had beat The Oprah Winfrey Show in ratings on some days in a few markets.
