= The Modds =

American garage rock band

Background information
- Origin: Miami, Florida, United States
- Genres: Garage rock; protopunk
- Years active: 1965, 2002
- Past members: Dean Liapis; John Mascaro; Don Ricketts; Dewey Bond; Bob Nimer; Dennis O'Barry

The Modds were an American garage rock band from Miami, Florida who were active in the mid-1960s, and briefly re-united in 2002. Though they did not release a record during the 1960s, their work has been posthumously compiled. Today they are best known for the song "Don't Be Late."

== History ==
The band was formed in early 1965 in Miami, Florida by guitarist John Mascaro, bassist Don Ricketts, and drummer Dewey Bond, all of whom had recently played in local band, the Deltonas. All were students at Southwest Miami Senior High School, which was also the high school of several other noted bands from Miami at that time, such as the Montells, who have sometimes been mentioned as rivals, and Evil. John Mascaro was originally from Rochester, New York, but his family had moved to Miami in 1958. He began playing guitar in 1962. His first band was the Crystals, who were together only briefly. He later joined the Surfin' Vibrations. He co-formed another group, the Intruders, with Chuck Guy, who had been the lead singer for the Intruders. Don Ricketts would also join that band, but the Intruders folded shortly thereafter. In 1964 Mascaro and Rickets joined the Deltonas, who had been around since 1961 and whose first drummer, Dewey Bonds, had been one of its founding members. The Deltonas broke up shortly after Christmas, 1964.

In 1965 Mascaro, Rickets and Dewey Bonds assembled the Modds and recruited Dean Laipis on lead vocals, and Bob Nimer on lead guitar. Dennis O'Barry later succeeded Nimer on lead guitar. The band was highly influenced by British Invasion, citing the Beatles' February 9, 1964 performance of the Ed Sullivan Show as a major influence. They would be one of the first local bands to cover the Rolling Stones' 1965 hit song, "Satisfaction" in live performances, however, their repertoire also reflected the influence of American R&B and soul acts such as Sam Cooke. The band's name was influenced by the popular mod movement going on in England at the time, but the band added an extra "-d" to the end of the name. Most of their rehearsals were conducted at Mascaro's or Dewey's houses. The band would play frat parties, local dance halls, such as the PAL (Police Athletic League), usually averaging $3.00 to $10.00 per member each night, but would occasionally play for free. With the help of their science teacher at Southwest High, Ray Skopp, who became their manager, the band would eventually be able to land gigs at posh Miami Beach hotels such as the Americana, the Fontainebleau, and the Deuville, where the Beatles appeared for their second Ed Sullivan performance.

In June 1965 the Modds recorded a double-sided acetate featuring "Don't Be Late," an original composition, b/w "So in Love" at Miami's Dukoff Studios. The songs were recorded quickly in a few takes with no overdubs. It would not be released as a single but the acetate fell into the hands of a deejay at local AM radio station WFUN, "Doc Downey," Morton Downey, Jr., previously from WONE in Dayton, Ohio, and later to gain fame as a controversial television talk show host in the 1980s and 1990s, who began spinning the cut, "Don't Be Late," during his evening show. Downey, had pushed records by local bands such as the Modds and the Montells, but soon became embroiled in several scandals during his tenure with WFUN, and would soon leave the station.

The airplay helped the Modds land an appearance at a Columbia Records convention, where they opened for the Byrds and Paul Revere & the Raiders. According to Dewey Bond: "We were very nervous because the Byrds were sitting in the front row watching us. I remember David Crosby sitting there and smiling at me...the record company really liked us and we found out later they were ready to sign us." A deal with Columbia was being arranged when John Mascaro was drafted into the Army and Liapis joined the Air Force, effectively bringing about the band's end.

Dewey Bond would go on form the band, Asbury Park, and become an endorser for Ludwig Drums, doing clinics and appearances an NAMM conventions, eventually opening Allstar Lighting & Sound located in Orlando, Florida. John Mascaro, after returning from service in Vietnam, started the John Mace Group, and later became an office quality control technician for a medical survey company. Bob Nimer committed suicide in 1976. Don Ricketts died of a protracted battle with emphysema in 2005.

In the summer of 2002, Liapis, Mascaro and Bond reunited for a one-time show in Eustis, Florida alongside fellow South Florida 1960s garage acts the Montells and Evil. The Psychedelic States: Florida In The 60s Vol. 3 compilation by Gear Fab has included the song "Don't Be Late."

== Membership ==
- Dean Liapis (lead vocals)
- John Mascaro (rhythm guitar)
- Don Ricketts (bass)
- Dewey Bond (drums)
- Bob Nimer (lead guitar)
- Dennis O'Barry (lead guitar)

== Discography ==
- "Don't Be Late" b/w "So in Love" (unissued acetate recorded at Dukoff Studios)
