= David Hans Schmidt =

American businessman (1960–2007)

David Hans Schmidt (May 27, 1960 – September 28, 2007) was a broker in celebrity photos and other celebrity related items. His specialization in acquiring celebrity sex videos and nude photos earned him the nickname "The Sultan of Sleaze," a moniker he was proud to have. In addition to celebrity videos/photos, he marketed other celebrity goods, such as the diaries of Paris Hilton, the nude images of Amber Frey, the mistress of convicted murderer Scott Peterson.

Schmidt, born in Rochester, Minnesota, launched his career by brokering a deal between Playboy and Bill Clinton's mistress Gennifer Flowers.

== Tom Cruise and Katie Holmes ==
In early 2007, Schmidt agreed to plead guilty to attempted extortion after federal authorities said he contacted Tom Cruise and tried to extort him, threatened to release photos of Cruise and Holmes' wedding in Italy last year unless he was paid $1.2 million to $1.3 million.

== Suicide ==
On Friday, September 28, 2007, Schmidt was found dead in his home in Arizona. His death was ruled a suicide by hanging.
