= WWOR-TV =

Television station in Secaucus, New Jersey

- Secaucus, New Jersey; New York, New York; United States
- City: Secaucus, New Jersey (Note: Originally licensed to New York, New York; city of license changed to Secaucus in 1983.)
- Channels: Digital: 25 (UHF), shared with WRNN-TV; Virtual: 9
- Branding: Fox 5+

Programming
- Affiliations: 9.1: Independent with MyNetworkTV; 9.3: Buzzr; 9.4: Heroes & Icons

Ownership
- Owner: Fox Television Stations, LLC
- Sister stations: WNYW

History
- Founded: April 1947
- First air date: October 11, 1949
- Former call signs: WOR-TV (1949–1987)
- Former channel numbers: Analog: 9 (VHF, 1949–2009); Digital: 38 (UHF, 2002–2018); Translator: 71 W71AK Bronx
- Former affiliations: Independent (1949–1995); UPN (1995–2006)
- Call sign meaning: Variation of WOR-TV

Technical information
- Licensing authority: FCC
- Facility ID: 74197
- ERP: 57.8 kW; 39 kW (STA)
- HAAT: 520 m (1,706 ft)
- Transmitter coordinates: 40°42′46.8″N 74°0′47.3″W

Links
- Public license information: Public file; LMS
- Website: Official website

WWOR-TV (channel 9), branded as Fox 5+, is a television station licensed to Secaucus, New Jersey, United States, serving the New York City market and owned by the Fox Television Stations group. It is programmed primarily as an independent, but maintains a secondary affiliation with MyNetworkTV (as the service's flagship station). Under common ownership with Fox network flagship WNYW (channel 5), the two stations share studios at the Fox Television Center on East 67th Street in Manhattan's Lenox Hill neighborhood; WWOR-TV's transmitter is located at One World Trade Center.

== History ==
=== WOR-TV (1949–1987) ===
==== Early history ====
Channel 9 signed on the air on October 11, 1949, as WOR-TV. It was owned by the Bamberger Broadcasting Service (a division of R. H. Macy and Company and named after the Bamberger's department store chain), which also operated WOR (710 AM) and WOR-FM (98.7 FM, now WEPN-FM). Exactly ten months earlier, Bamberger launched Washington, D.C.'s fourth television station, WOIC, also on channel 9. WOR-TV entered the New York market as the last of the city's VHF stations to sign on, and one of three independents—the others being WPIX (channel 11) and Newark, New Jersey–based WATV (channel 13). On WOR-TV's opening night, a welcome address was read by WOR radio's morning host, John B. Gambling. However, the audio portion of the speech was not heard because of a technical glitch. The problem was fixed and Gambling repeated the message later that evening, prior to the station's sign-off.

That first broadcast and other early WOR-TV shows emanated from the New Amsterdam Theatre's Roof Garden, located west of Times Square. For a short time, the station's transmitter operated from WOR TV Tower in North Bergen, New Jersey, and was later moved to the Empire State Building. At the start of 1950, Bamberger Broadcasting changed its name to General Teleradio. Later that year, WOIC was sold to a joint venture of The Washington Post and CBS, who would change that station's call sign to WTOP-TV. In 1951, the station moved uptown to the newly constructed "9 Television Square" facility at 101 West 67th Street. The West 67th Street studio was built from the ground up as a television facility. Initially built by the Robert Gless Co. for the Bamberger Broadcasting Service, the building itself was owned by the Macy's employee pension fund, and it had been leased prior to completion to Thomas S. Lee Enterprises (a company that was later absorbed into RKO General). Lee, the son of the broadcasting pioneer Don Lee, owned several Mutual Network stations on the West Coast, and held a 25-year lease on the building running January 1952 to January 1977. Soon after the building was completed in 1952, Macy's–Bamberger's merged the WOR stations with the General Tire and Rubber Company, which already had broadcasting interests in three cities through two other subsidiaries: the regional Yankee Radio Network and WNAC AM–FM–TV in Boston; and the Don Lee Broadcasting System, which operated KHJ AM–FM–TV in Los Angeles and KFRC AM–FM in San Francisco. The subsidiaries were then brought together under the General Teleradio name. The main impetus for the merger was to give General Tire a controlling share in the Mutual Radio Network, which was affiliated with and partially owned by WOR and other stations. The merger also raised speculation that Mutual would launch a television network, plans that were discussed since before WOR-TV went on the air. However, shortly before the merger, in April 1950, plans for the proposed Mutual-branded network advanced far enough that, at the annual meeting of Mutual stockholders, network president Frank White made an official announcement of the planned creation of a limited five-station Mutual network (Boston, New York, Washington, D.C., Chicago, and Los Angeles). At that same time Mutual radio station KQV in Pittsburgh, which was engaged in an ultimately unsuccessful attempt to get a television license, was reportedly hoping for their station to be a Mutual television affiliate. "Mutual Television Network" ended up being the decided-on branding for the Mutual-branded network. However, the five-station Mutual network failed in short time. After a transitional period, WOR relocated TV operations to their headquarters at 1440 Broadway closer to its radio station sisters and to a new compact studio for news and special events programming located on the 83rd floor of the Empire State Building. In early 1954, RKO sublet the 67th Street facility (both building and TV equipment) to NBC for three years with options for extensions.

In 1955, General Tire purchased RKO Radio Pictures, giving the company's TV stations access to RKO's film library, and in 1959, General Tire's broadcasting and film divisions were renamed as RKO General. During the 1950s and early 1960s, all three of New York's independents struggled to find competitive and acceptable programming. The field would increase by one in 1956 when former DuMont flagship station WABD (channel 5) became an independent. During this era, WOR-TV's programming was comparable to its rivals, with a blend of movies, children's programs, canceled TV series which had previously run on one of the networks, and public affairs shows. In 1962, the field of independent stations was narrowed to three, as WOR-TV and its competition benefited from the sale of WNTA-TV (channel 13), formerly the anchor station of the short-lived NTA Film Network, to the non-profit Educational Broadcasting Corporation, who would convert the station to a non-commercial educational station and National Educational Television affiliate/member station.

For much of the 1960s, WOR-TV was a standard independent station with a schedule composed of some local public affairs shows, off-network programs, children's shows such as The Friendly Giant (which later moved to WNDT) and Romper Room (which moved to the station from WNEW-TV in 1966), sporting events, and a large catalog of movies, some of which came from the RKO Radio Pictures film library. Until 1985, the station had a tradition of showing King Kong, Son of Kong and Mighty Joe Young on Thanksgiving and Godzilla films the day after Thanksgiving.

In 1962, nostalgia maven Joe Franklin moved his daily talk program to WOR-TV, after a 12-year run on WABC-TV. The Joe Franklin Show ended on August 6, 1993, which, having run for 42 years, makes it one of the longest-running programs in television history, local or national. The long-running public affairs show Firing Line began on WOR-TV in 1966 and ran on the station until 1971, after which its host, William F. Buckley, Jr., moved the program to public television where the program aired until it ended in 1999. In 1968, the station continued to maintain offices at 1440 Broadway, while the station moved to new studio facilities two blocks north at 1481 Broadway.

==== 1970s ====
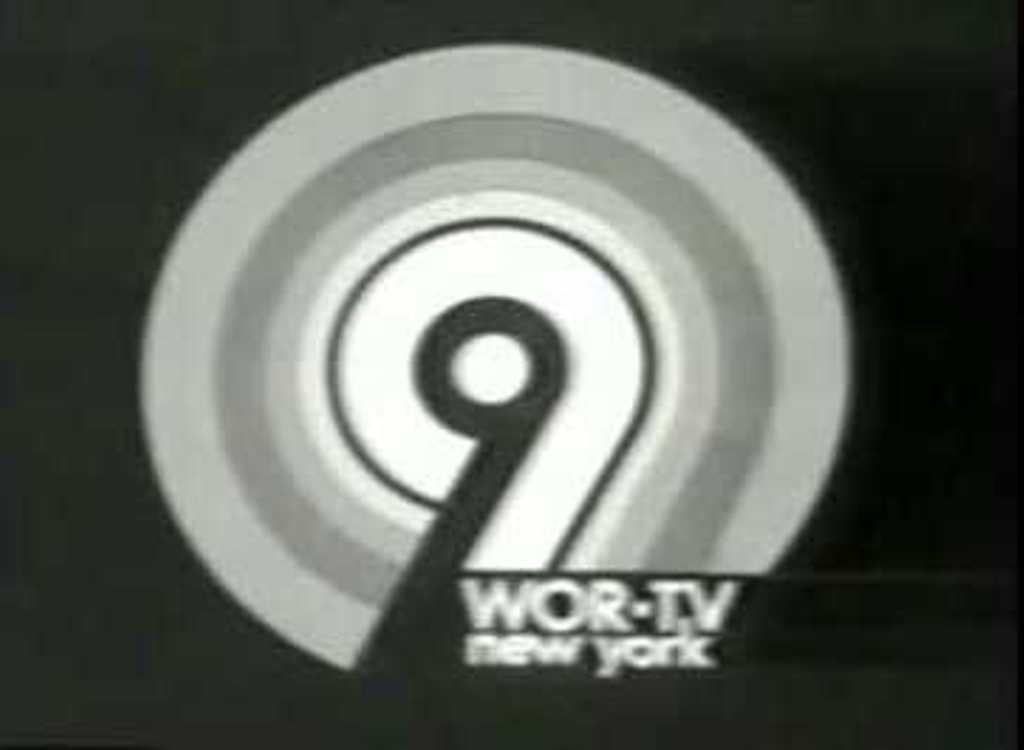
1971 WOR-TV I.D. slide. This 'dotted 9' logo was used from 1970 to 1987.

By the early 1970s, WNEW-TV evolved into the leading station for cartoons and sitcoms, while WPIX aired a similar format though with more movies. In the early 1970s, WOR-TV had shows such as The Beverly Hillbillies, The Dick Van Dyke Show, Gilligan's Island and The Avengers. Beginning in 1971, the station began gradually seeking a different programming strategy—one that was more adult-oriented with a heavy emphasis on films, reruns of hour-long network dramas, game shows and sports. The station also gradually phased out most sitcoms and all children's programming with the exception of Romper Room. It was also the first New York City station to have a noon newscast on weekdays, in addition to producing several hours a day of local talk shows (such as The Joe Franklin Show, Straight Talk and public affairs shows such as Meet the Mayors, titles that were shared by other RKO General television stations). WOR-TV also aired Spanish-language telenovelas on weekdays in the early 1970s, such as the Argentinian-Peruvian co-production Nino, las cosas simples de la vida.

Later in the 1970s, WOR-TV looked towards the United Kingdom for alternative offerings. On September 6, 1976, WOR-TV offered a week of programs from Thames Television during prime time; many of these shows had never before been seen on American television, including the first U.S. telecasts of The Benny Hill Show, the Quentin Crisp biographical film The Naked Civil Servant, and an airing of an episode of Man About the House, which would be adapted by ABC as Three's Company the following year. WOR-TV also aired episodes of the ITV musical drama Rock Follies and the BBC science-fiction series Doctor Who during this period. On April 5, 1980, WOR-TV presented Japan Tonight!, a seven-hour block of programs from Japan's Tokyo Broadcasting System, featuring shows that were either dubbed or subtitled in English. During this period, various sports telecasts aired on most nights in prime time, with feature films running on nights where sports did not air under the Million Dollar Movie banner.

In 1984, WOR-TV began moving classic sitcoms like Bewitched, Burns & Allen, I Dream of Jeannie, and others into its weekday lineup, focused slightly less on sports, and added more off network drama shows to the lineup. The station also pulled back religious programming as well, pushing it earlier in the morning. With the advent of cable and satellite-delivered television, independent stations were being uplinked for regional and national distribution, thus becoming "superstations". In April 1979, Syracuse, New York-based Eastern Microwave, Inc. began distributing WOR-TV to cable and C-band satellite subscribers across the United States, joining WTBS in Atlanta and WGN-TV in Chicago as national superstations.

==== Troubles with the FCC ====
While WOR-TV was gaining national exposure, a battle for the station's survival—and that of its owner—was well underway. In 1975, RKO applied for renewal of its license to operate WOR-TV. The Federal Communications Commission (FCC) conditioned this renewal on that of its Boston sister station, WNAC-TV. In 1980, the FCC stripped RKO of WNAC-TV's license due to a litany of offenses dating back to the 1960s, but ultimately because RKO had withheld evidence of corporate misconduct by General Tire. The decision meant that RKO lost WOR-TV's license and that of Los Angeles sister station KHJ-TV. However, an appeals court ruled that the FCC had erred in tying WOR-TV and KHJ-TV's renewals to WNAC-TV, and ordered new proceedings. RKO soon found itself under renewed pressure from the FCC, which began soliciting applications for all of the company's broadcast licenses in February 1983.

==== Move to New Jersey ====
Station closing logo used during final months of RKO ownership before becoming WWOR-TV (1986)

To buy itself some time, RKO (with the help of New Jersey senator Bill Bradley) persuaded the U.S. Congress to pass a law requiring the FCC to automatically renew the license of any VHF station that moved its license to a state not served by a commercial VHF station. New Jersey and Delaware were the only states not to be served by a commercial VHF station, and there were complaints for many years that New Jersey in particular had been "underserved" by VHF stations from the New York City and Philadelphia markets (New Jersey was left without any commercial VHF allocations located within the state due to the 1962 conversion of Newark's channel 13 to a non-commercial outlet). Soon after this law took effect, RKO transferred WOR-TV's license to Secaucus, New Jersey, seven miles (11 km) west of Manhattan, on April 20, 1983. However, for all intents and purposes, it remained a New York City station. WOR radio had originally been licensed to Newark when it signed on in 1922; while it moved its studios across the Hudson River in 1926, it remained licensed in Newark until 1941.

One of the FCC's conditions of renewing channel 9's license required RKO to move the station's main studio to New Jersey. Three years after its city of license was changed to Secaucus, New Jersey, WOR-TV moved its operations to the newly built Nine Broadcast Plaza in Secaucus on January 13, 1986. The FCC also required channel 9 to increase its coverage of events on the New Jersey side of the market. One month later, the New Jersey State Senate petitioned the FCC to approve an extension of the channel 9 signal into southern New Jersey. Because of various other issues, one of which would be the fact that rights to most syndicated programs would interfere with the local broadcast rights to these shows on Philadelphia stations, the request was denied.

The move to New Jersey did little to relieve the regulatory pressure on RKO. Seeing the handwriting on the wall, RKO put channel 9 up for sale in 1985. Westinghouse Broadcasting, Chris-Craft Industries, and a joint venture of Cox Enterprises and MCA/Universal emerged as the leading suitors for WOR-TV; the station was sold to the Cox/MCA group in late 1986 for $387 million. Cox later withdrew the joint venture due to disagreements between the two firms on who would be responsible for running the station, leaving MCA to take sole ownership of WOR-TV on April 21, 1987. The sale came just in the nick of time for RKO: two months after MCA closed on the purchase, an administrative law judge recommended that RKO be forced out of broadcasting altogether due to a litany of misconduct. Eventually, WOR radio would be sold to Hartford, Connecticut-based Buckley Broadcasting, and WRKS-FM (now WEPN-FM) would go to Summit Broadcasting.

=== As WWOR-TV (1987–present) ===
==== MCA/Pinelands/Chris-Craft/BHC era (1987–1995) ====
Upon MCA taking control, channel 9 added an extra "W" to its call letters becoming WWOR-TV on April 29, 1987. MCA knew it had to change the call letters (due to an FCC regulation in place at that time that prohibited non-commonly-owned TV and radio stations in the same market from sharing the same base call sign), but still wanted to trade on the 65-year heritage of the WOR calls in the New York area. Initially, the station's programming stayed nearly the same, while the RKO-era "dotted 9" logo was replaced by a new "red 9". MCA relaunched WWOR-TV that fall with a new, all-CGI look. The logo was replaced with a new "Venetian-blinds 9"; movie and special presentations were preceded by a new, more dramatic intro, while a new, three-pointed triangle was used in the main ident and in the first intro for The News at Ten, representing the Tri-State area. However, the RKO-era announcers stayed on, and all but six hours of programming per day remained the same. The station dropped most of its public affairs shows, Romper Room was cut back to a half-hour and moved to 6 am, all religious shows except for the Sunday Mass were dropped, cartoons were added to the station's morning lineup and stronger syndicated shows were added in the early evenings. Late morning timeslots consisted of classic sitcoms and afternoons continued to consist of game shows, drama series and movies. Programs seen in both dayparts were largely those held over from the station's final years under RKO ownership. Later that fall, in prime time, the Million Dollar Movie was relegated to weekends in favor of Morton Downey Jr.'s controversial new talk show, while the 8 p.m. newscast was moved to 10 p.m. and expanded to one hour (to emphasize this, it was briefly titled The News at Ten; this did not last long and by 1988, it became Channel 9 News).

The overhaul continued in 1988 and 1989, when it added the locally produced kids' show Steampipe Alley, and more evening sitcoms, including among others, reruns of top-rated sitcoms The Cosby Show and Who's the Boss?, as well as MCA/Universal-sourced programming including Kate & Allie, The Munsters Today, My Secret Identity, and The New Lassie. WWOR-TV also borrowed program formats used on the Westinghouse stations: a short-lived version of Evening Magazine aired in prime time, and a locally produced talk show called People Are Talking ran at 11 am. That show would later change its title to 9 Broadcast Plaza (named after the station's Secaucus studio location), and then to The Richard Bey Show for syndication. During this time, the studios were a hotbed of production, including the aforementioned local shows, The Morton Downey Jr. Show (which was nationally syndicated by then-sister firm MCA TV), and The Howard Stern Show hosted by New York radio personality Howard Stern from 1990 to 1992. Because of this, the station's newscasts had to be moved to the newsroom, and it would not return to having its own set until joining UPN.

In 1989, the FCC passed the "Syndicated Exclusivity Rights" rule (or "SyndEx") into law—which required cable providers to black out certain syndicated programs on out-of-market stations where local broadcasters claim the rights to air in a particular market. To lighten the burden on cable providers as a result of this law, Eastern Microwave acquired the rights to programs to which no station owned exclusive in-market rights. It then broadcast this programming on WWOR's national feed to replace programs that could not be aired nationally. Most of the programs came from the Universal and Quinn Martin libraries, along with some shows from The Christian Science Monitor's television service, as well as some holdover shows that had aired on the local New York feed before the SyndEx law's passage. Eastern Microwave would eventually launch a separate feed for satellite and cable subscribers on January 1, 1990, called the "WWOR EMI Service". By the early 1990s, WWOR and WPIX began to be replaced on many cable systems by the superstation feed of WGN-TV, which also launched an alternate feed for nationwide viewers in response to SyndEx regulations.

During autumn 1990, WWOR-TV began branding itself as Universal 9 on-air, highlighting its association with the MCA/Universal entertainment empire. However, later that same autumn, MCA's ownership of the station ended with the company's purchase by Osaka, Japan–based Matsushita Electric. Since FCC regulations do not allow foreign companies to own more than a 25 percent interest in a television station, MCA spun off the assets of WWOR-TV into a new company called Pinelands, Incorporated on January 1, 1991. Universal would re-enter the New York television market after it merged with NBC to form NBCUniversal in 2004, acquiring the network's flagship station, WNBC, in the process. WWOR partnered with KCOP-TV and MCA TV Entertainment on a two night programming block, Hollywood Premiere Network starting in October 1990, the month before Matsushita's purchase of MCA. Channel 9 also aired select episodes of the Australian soap opera Neighbours from mid-June to mid-September 1991.

On March 30, 1992, Disney Studios agreed to sell KCAL-TV (the erstwhile KHJ-TV) to Pinelands, Inc. for a 45 percent ownership stake in Pinelands, so as to have interest in TV stations in the two largest markets, New York and Los Angeles, allowing for increased original programming. Instead, Pinelands agreed to an unsolicited bid in May from Chris-Craft Industries' BHC Communications subsidiary, thus ending the planned business merger with Disney's KCAL, making WWOR a sister station to Chris-Craft/BHC's KCOP in the process. Disney later acquired WABC-TV as part of its larger purchase of Capital Cities/ABC Inc. in 1996.

In 1993, BHC aligned its independent stations with the Prime Time Entertainment Network. WWOR carried Spelling Premiere Network at its launch in August 1994.

==== UPN affiliation (1995–2006) ====
WWOR-TV's first logo under UPN affiliation, used from 1995 to 2002.

In 1994, Chris-Craft and its broadcasting subsidiary, BHC Communications, and Viacom's newly acquired subsidiary Paramount Pictures partnered to form the United Paramount Network (UPN), which debuted on January 16, 1995. In 1996, Viacom bought 50 percent of UPN from Chris-Craft. At the network's launch, WWOR-TV was UPN's "flagship" station. However, UPN did not allow WWOR's superstation feed to carry the network's programs nationally (in contrast, The WB allowed WGN-TV to air network programming on cable feed during that network's first four years on the air). In the 1990s, the station continued with a large amount of younger-skewing talk shows, reality programming, some sitcoms in evenings, and syndicated cartoons during the morning hours.

On January 1, 1997, with only a month's advance warning, Advance Entertainment Corporation, which had purchased the satellite distribution rights to WWOR from Eastern Microwave a few months earlier, stopped uplinking the national version. The EMI Service's transponder space was sold to Discovery Communications for the then six-month-old Animal Planet. Amid outcries from satellite dish owners, National Programming Service, LLC uplinked the station again exclusively for satellite subscribers. The national feed was once again the same feed as the New York market feed. NPS dropped WWOR in 1999, in favor of Pax TV, but Dish Network still carries the New York feed of WWOR as part of its superstations package except in areas where the local UPN (and later, MyNetworkTV) affiliate invoked SyndEx to block the feed.

In 2000, Chris-Craft announced that it was selling its television stations. It was believed that Viacom, which had purchased Chris-Craft's half of the network that year not long after buying CBS—gaining full control of UPN (and effectively stripping WWOR of its status as an owned-and-operated station of the network in the process), would buy the stations. However, Viacom lost its bid for the group to the Fox Television Stations subsidiary of News Corporation on August 12, 2000, in a $5.5 billion deal, making WWOR-TV a sister station to longtime rival WNYW—creating a unique situation in which the largest affiliate station of one network was owned by the operator of another network. While some cast doubt on UPN's future, Fox quickly cut a new affiliation deal with UPN.

On September 11, 2001, the transmitter facilities of WWOR-TV and eight other New York City television stations and several FM radio stations were destroyed when two hijacked airplanes crashed into and destroyed the World Trade Center towers. With its broadcast signal shut down, WWOR fed its signal directly to cable and satellite systems, running wall-to-wall coverage of the attacks from CNN and later the Fox News Channel. The station's website received unprecedented traffic but remained available, including streaming video of pre-recorded newscasts. Channel 9 resumed regular programming on September 17, 2001. The station installed a new transmitter at the Empire State Building (where the transmitter had been based prior to 1975) along with most of the other major New York City stations, until moving back to One World Trade Center in 2018. The attacks delayed the closing of the Chris-Craft deal for several days.

Fox began integrating the operations of its two stations soon afterwards. Also on September 17, 2001, the Fox Kids weekday afternoon block moved to WWOR-TV from WNYW, while the station also ran UPN's Disney's One Too during the morning hours. Channel 9 was New York City's last remaining commercial station to air children's programming on both weekday mornings and afternoons, an ironic twist from 20 years earlier; however, Fox later discontinued the Fox Kids weekday block in January 2002 while UPN ended its cartoon block in August 2003; WWOR then picked up syndicated cartoons in the fall of 2003 in the 7 to 9 am slot (and later until 8 am), before dropping them in 2006. This made WWOR-TV the last commercial station to run any cartoons on weekdays. This was the second time the station phased out cartoons in favor of mandated children's programming which WWOR has aired in its early years. WNYW also placed several of its underperforming syndicated shows on WWOR, and cherry-picked channel 9's stronger programs for broadcast on channel 5's schedule. Currently, WWOR offers several "double-runs" of WNYW's programs, but the two stations' individual schedules (outside of network programming) are much different.

WWOR-TV's second and final logo under UPN affiliation, used from 2002 to 2006.

In 2004, Fox Television Stations announced that it would shut down WWOR-TV's Secaucus facilities and move its operations to WNYW's facility at the Fox Television Center in Manhattan. WNYW had already been handling some of WWOR's internal operations for some time before then. Fox planned to keep 9 Broadcast Plaza as a satellite relay station for WNYW and WWOR (the facility also performed master control operations for Baltimore's MyNetworkTV affiliate WUTB until locally based Sinclair Broadcast Group purchased WUTB from Fox in 2013). While some office functions were merged, plans for a full move to Manhattan were scuttled later that year due to pressure from New Jersey Congressman Steve Rothman (whose congressional district included Secaucus) and Senator Frank Lautenberg. The two lawmakers contended that if WWOR moved its operations back across the Hudson, it would be violating its conditions of license. According to Rothman, WWOR's license specifically required that its main studio be based in New Jersey. Even without this to consider, a full merger of WNYW and WWOR's operations would have likely resulted in channel 9's news department being downsized to the point that it would not be able to adequately cover news events focused on New Jersey, if not shut down altogether. As mentioned above, WWOR's license requires it to emphasize coverage of events on the New Jersey side of the market.

==== MyNetworkTV affiliation (2006–present) ====
Logo used from 2006 to 2026.

On February 22, 2006, News Corporation announced the launch of a new "sixth" network called MyNetworkTV, which would be operated by Fox Television Stations and its syndication division 20th Television. MyNetworkTV was created to compete against another upstart network that would launch at the same time that September, The CW (an amalgamated network that was originally consisted primarily of UPN and The WB's higher-rated programs) as well as to give UPN and WB stations that were not mentioned as becoming CW affiliates another option besides converting to independent stations. WPIX, which had been a WB affiliate since 1995, was announced as The CW's New York City market affiliate as part of a 10-year affiliation deal with channel 11's parent company Tribune Broadcasting. The network's officials were on record as preferring the "strongest" stations among The WB and UPN's affiliates, none of which included any of Fox's UPN-affiliated stations—locally, WPIX had been well ahead of WWOR-TV in overall viewership for some time.

The day after the announcement of The CW's formation (January 25, 2006), Fox removed all network references from the on-air branding of its UPN affiliates, and stopped promoting UPN programs altogether. WWOR accordingly changed its branding from "UPN 9" to "WWOR 9" (although the station was referred to on-air as simply "9"), and altered its logo to only feature the boxed "9" with a small red strip on the left side. WWOR had just introduced a new graphics package for its newscasts and a revised logo almost three weeks prior, with UPN branding.

With the impending switch to MyNetworkTV, channel 9's on-air branding was changed to "My9" beginning on April 4, with the new brand being introduced during Nets and Yankees game telecasts; two weeks later on April 17, WWOR incorporated the "My9" name into the station's remaining branding elements, including news. On June 2, WWOR changed its logo again, this time adopting one similar to the MyNetworkTV logo presented at the launch announcement. Despite MyNetworkTV's announcement that its launch date would be September 5, 2006, UPN continued to broadcast on stations across the country until September 15, 2006. While some UPN affiliates that switched to MyNetworkTV aired the final two weeks of UPN programming outside its regular prime time period, WWOR and the rest of the network's Fox-owned affiliates dropped UPN's programming entirely on August 31, 2006.

WWOR-TV discontinued regular programming on its analog signal, over VHF channel 9, at 11:59 pm on June 12, 2009, as part of the federally mandated transition from analog to digital television. The last program to air on analog was an episode of Law & Order: Criminal Intent. The station's digital signal remained on its pre-transition UHF channel 38, using virtual channel 9.

On October 15, 2010, News Corporation pulled WWOR, WNYW, WTXF (South Jersey only), Fox Business, Fox Deportes, and Nat Geo Wild from Cablevision systems in the New York City Tri-state area, due to a dispute between Fox and Cablevision in which Cablevision claimed that News Corporation demanded $150 million a year to renew its carriage of 12 Fox-owned channels. News Corporation responded to Cablevision's claims. Cablevision offered to submit to binding arbitration on October 14, 2010, though News Corporation rejected Cablevision's proposal, stating that it would "reward Cablevision for refusing to negotiate fairly". WWOR, WNYW, WTXF and the three cable channels were restored on October 30, 2010, when Cablevision and News Corporation struck a new carriage deal.

On November 3, 2011, Fox Television Stations signed an affiliation agreement with Bounce TV, a subchannel network aimed at African American audiences, to carry the service on the second or third digital subchannels of its MyNetworkTV-affiliated stations.

On January 7, 2014, WWOR applied for a digital fill-in translator on channel 34 from the Armstrong Tower and licensed to Alpine, New Jersey, that will serve the northern viewing area.

===== 2007–2014 license renewal and objections =====
Before August 2014, the station awaited renewal of its broadcast license since 2007, the same year that two petitions to deny the license's renewal were submitted. According to claims from U.S. Senator Frank Lautenberg and media observers, who filed a complaint with the FCC in November 2009, WWOR-TV's performance was "clearly inadequate to meet its public interest obligations" and he questioned the truthfulness of its application. The station was also accused of misrepresenting the number of station employees based in Secaucus, and failing to report a reduction in local news coverage.

On February 17, 2011, the FCC opened an investigation against then-WWOR parent News Corporation to determine whether the company misrepresented information about WWOR-TV's news operations and programming during the station's license review. News Corporation would have been stripped of its licenses to operate both WWOR-TV and sister station WNYW, as well as facing other penalties if found guilty of any wrongdoing (News Corporation spun off both stations and its other U.S. television properties to 21st Century Fox in June 2013). Legal representation hired by WWOR stated that the station had fulfilled its commitments. In December 2012, Lautenberg called for an investigation into the potential relaxing of FCC rules regarding ownership consolidation within media markets stating that News Corporation's co-ownership of WNYW and the New York Post "has not served New Jersey well". Following Lautenberg's June 3, 2013, death and the subsequent announcement of the WWOR news department's closure one month later, fellow New Jersey senator Robert Menendez took up the cause, saying it was increasingly critical with WWOR dropping their newscast and going with the outside Chasing New Jersey for coverage of state issues for the FCC to make a ruling on WWOR's license and their fulfillment of their obligations. Rep. Frank Pallone also called for the revocation of WWOR's license. In November 2013 the New Jersey Legislature passed a resolution urging the FCC to revoke the station's license.

In March 2014, New Jersey's senior United States senator, Bob Menendez, wrote to the FCC asking for swift action to determine if the station had been fulfilling its licensing requirements.

New Jersey is one of the most densely populated states in the country, but because of its location between New York City and Philadelphia, does not have a designated market area (DMA)...WWOR is required to fill this gap by operating in the state of New Jersey to the benefit of all residents. Unfortunately, concerns have mounted that the operations of WWOR have not fulfilled these requirements.

On August 8, 2014, the FCC renewed WWOR's license, dismissing all of the objecting petitions, though the permanent waiver allowing Fox Television Stations to run both WNYW and WWOR along with 21st Century Fox's shared ownership with the New York Post was denied; a temporary waiver was granted.

===== 2018 license renewal and full consolidation with WNYW =====
In January 2018, Senators Menendez and Cory Booker said the station had "failed to live up to its federal mandate" to cover New Jersey news. Despite this, the station's license was renewed by the FCC on July 12, 2018, for a new ten-year cycle without objection; Booker and Menendez have continued to push for revocation of the station's license.

One month after the license renewal, Fox Television Stations sold 9 Broadcast Plaza back to Hartz Mountain Industries (which developed the Secaucus office park WWOR-TV's facility was built in) for $4.05 million, several months after the repeal of the FCC's Main Studio Rule which mandated continued operation of WWOR from Secaucus. Since that point, WWOR's operations have been consolidated with WNYW in Manhattan, and the building, which remains standing as of 2025, has had all WWOR-related television equipment removed.

Rebranding promo (2026)

===== 2026 rebrand =====
On September 28, 2026, WWOR-TV dropped the "My9" branding after 20 years in favor of "Fox 5+". This put it in line with other co-owned stations that are sisters to the main Fox outlets, and ended the last vestige of MyNetworkTV branding across its arsenal of owned-and-operated stations.

== Programming ==
=== Sports programming ===
As an independent station, channel 9's schedule was heavy on sports programming. Early in its history, WOR-TV established itself as the home of National League baseball in New York, carrying Brooklyn Dodgers (beginning in 1950) and New York Giants games (beginning in 1951) until both teams moved to California (Los Angeles and San Francisco, respectively) following the 1957 season. From 1958 to 1961, the station aired a limited schedule of Philadelphia Phillies games, consisting of matchups against the Dodgers and Giants. In 1962, WOR-TV gained broadcast rights to the New York Mets, the National League's new expansion team. The partnership between the station and the team would last through the 1998 season, after which the Mets moved their broadcasts to WPIX, replacing Yankee telecasts on the station.

Channel 9 acquired rights to the NHL's New York Rangers and the NBA's New York Knicks in 1965, holding onto both teams until 1989 (when the two teams' television rights moved exclusively to cable on the MSG Network). Other sports teams that have been broadcast on the station include the New York Islanders, New Jersey Devils, New York/New Jersey Nets, local college basketball, and the New York Cosmos. The station also carried syndicated professional wrestling programming from the WWWF/WWF, and later World Championship Wrestling. In later years, professional wrestling would return to WWOR by way of WWF/WWE's secondary flagship television program SmackDown!, which aired on the station from 1999 to 2006 (as a UPN affiliate) and again from 2008 to 2010 (as a MyNetworkTV O&O).

Except for the Mets (for whom [W]WOR did cover a large number of home games), WWOR's pro sports coverage mainly featured away games, although in the mid-1960s, the station taped a handful of Rangers' Saturday afternoon home games for broadcast that evening. One such game, on November 27, 1965, against the Chicago Blackhawks, is said to be the first NHL game to ever be broadcast in color.

WWOR-TV also broadcast an infamous interview between Mike Tyson and the station's then-sports anchor Russ Salzberg in January 1999, whose intent was to discuss Tyson's then comeback fight against Francois Botha; Tyson shouted several expletives, made threats and told the audience to switch the station off. This prompted Salzberg to abruptly end the interview, giving Tyson a half-hearted wish of luck on his upcoming fight. Tyson responded by telling Salzberg to "fuck off".

In late September 2001, WWOR-TV aired several New York Yankees baseball games that were originally scheduled to air on WNYW. In 2005, channel 9 picked up Yankees games on a full-time basis, with the broadcasts being produced by the YES Network. In 2015, Yankees games moved back to WPIX after ending a ten-year deal.

WWOR has sometimes aired New York Giants pre-season games due to commitments by WNBC to air network coverage of the Summer Olympics as has occurred in 2012 and 2016. WWOR has also simulcast ESPN-produced Monday Night Football games in which the Giants or Jets were involved (WABC-TV holds right of first refusal on local MNF broadcasts as a corporate sibling to ESPN, but often exercises that right to air ABC's Dancing with the Stars), as well as such games during the early existence of the NFL Network; WWOR was scheduled to be the local outlet for the December 30, 2007, Giants/Patriots game, but with the Patriots on the verge of an undefeated regular season, and NFL Network having minimal cable carriage at the time, the game ended up being simulcast nationally on CBS and NBC in addition to WWOR.

As a sister station to WNYW, WWOR has sometimes aired Fox sports programming while WNYW aired local programming. This was the case on September 11, 2021, when WNYW aired local 9/11 memorial programming while WWOR aired a nationally televised Fox College Football game. This was the case again on September 21, 2023, when WNYW aired a Thursday Night Football game between the New York Giants and the San Francisco 49ers, while WWOR aired a locally televised Baseball Night in America game between the New York Mets and the Philadelphia Phillies (coincidentally, as previously mentioned, WWOR aired Mets games from 1962 to 1998).

Currently, WWOR airs select Brooklyn Nets games produced by YES Network whenever YES broadcasts a Yankees game during the same time period. In 2023, two New York Liberty games also aired on the station, including one broadcast nationally on ABC due to WABC-TV televising the NYC Pride March. On November 18, 2023, WWOR aired a Seton Hall men's basketball game produced by Fox College Hoops.

On March 12, 2024, it was announced that WWOR and WNYW would become the new broadcast partner for the New York Liberty.

In February 2025, WWOR aired matches from the Coachella Valley Invitational preseason tournament featuring New York City FC and the New York Red Bulls of Major League Soccer.

=== Newscasts ===
As most of New York's independent stations were during the 1960s and 1970s, WOR-TV was a very minor player in the area of local news. Before 1971, the station did not carry any live news programming, but had an early morning audio-only newscast read by the on-duty staff announcer over the station logo. In 1971, WOR-TV launched its first live newscast, the News at Noon, which was also the first midday newscast in the New York City market. Tom Dunn, previously of WABC, was the lead anchor. In 1983, following the move to New Jersey, channel 9 launched a nightly 8 p.m. newscast called News 9: Primetime. After the MCA takeover in 1987, the 8 p.m. newscast was moved two hours later to 10 p.m., and expanded to an hour (placing it in direct competition with newscasts in that timeslot airing on WPIX and eventual sister station WNYW). Dunn opted to leave WWOR that summer, with his last newscast for channel 9 airing on June 19; he was replaced as lead anchor by Van Hackett, formerly of KTRK-TV in Houston. The noon program, which was later merged into 9 Broadcast Plaza, ended in 1993 and was replaced with The Ricki Lake Show.

Despite the presence of its sister station WNYW's long-running and successful news program at 10 p.m., WWOR-TV was able to compete in that same timeslot following Fox's acquisition of channel 9 simply because both stations use separate studios. As opposed to the model of most television station duopolies, WWOR-TV and sister station WNYW operated news departments that were technically separate from one another: WWOR operated its news department from the station's Secaucus studios, while WNYW runs theirs from the Fox Television Center in Manhattan, allowing the two stations to maintain their own on-air identities and offer individual local news programs simultaneously. However, the two stations shared a fairly significant amount in regards to news coverage, with some staffers having switched from one station to the other. Both stations maintained their own primary on-air personalities (such as news anchors and reporters) that only appeared on one station. WWOR's newscasts also focused a larger proportion of their stories on New Jersey issues, a condition the station had adhered to since its license was transferred from New York City to Secaucus.

On July 13, 2009, the 10 p.m. newscast was moved to 11 p.m. and was shortened to a half-hour due to budget cuts. In addition, weekend newscasts and a Sunday night sports highlight program were canceled. On June 27, 2011, WWOR-TV returned the newscast to its previous 10 p.m. timeslot and retitled it The Ten O'Clock News; it remained a half-hour in length and continued to air on weeknights only. On September 10, 2012, WWOR-TV began broadcasting its local newscasts in high definition.

Sports director Russ Salzberg, anchor Brenda Blackmon, and reporter Brenda Flanagan were the station's longest-tenured on-air personalities. Flanagan worked for the station starting in 1983, while Salzberg and Blackmon joined WWOR in 1988 and 1992, respectively. In areas of central New Jersey, where the New York and Philadelphia markets overlap with one another, both WWOR and WNYW shared resources with their Philadelphia sister station WTXF-TV. The stations shared reporters for stories occurring in New Jersey counties served by both markets.

The 10 p.m. newscast was canceled following its July 2, 2013, broadcast (ending 42 years of newscast production by channel 9 and 30 years of prime time newscasts); in its place, the station introduced Chasing New Jersey (which was later renamed to Chasing News), a nightly New Jersey-focused news magazine with a "fast-paced" format, on July 8. The program, which was produced by Fairfax Productions (a production company led by the vice president and general manager of Philadelphia sister station WTXF-TV) from a studio in Trenton and hosted by Bill Spadea, was also seen on WTXF as a lead-in to its morning newscast. With the end of WWOR's newscast, Brenda Blackmon was reassigned to produce and host news specials for the station (although she would leave for WPIX in 2016, while other members of the on-air staff were offered new roles (including at WNYW). Despite the closure of WWOR's news department, the station's Secaucus facilities remained operational until 2018, when the repeal of the FCC Main Studio Rule allowed the full consolidation of WWOR's operations with WNYW. Chasing News was canceled in June 2020, leaving WWOR without any news programming.

News programming would return to WWOR on August 12, 2024, by way of sister station WNYW, whose 6 p.m. weeknight newscasts WWOR would rebroadcast at 8 p.m.

=== Former personalities ===
- Steve Albert
- Ernie Anastos
- Richard Bey, host of his titular show
- Brenda Blackmon
- Mario Cantone
- Pat Collins
- Judith Crist
- Morton Downey Jr.
- Tom Dunn
- Carter Evans
- Dr. Frank Field
- Storm Field
- Joe Franklin
- Barry Gray
- Tony Guida
- Van Hackett
- Ray Heatherton
- Larry Kenney
- Sara Lee Kessler
- Walter Kiernan
- Matt Lauer
- Otis Livingston
- Mike Lupica
- Malachy McCourt
- Mary Helen McPhillips
- Cora-Ann Mihalik
- Sean Mooney
- Audrey Puente
- Bill Ryan
- Rolland Smith
- Howard Stern
- Phil Tonken
- Jennifer Valoppi
- Lisa Willis
- Kelly Wright
- Lloyd Lindsay Young
- John Zacherle

== Subchannels ==
Subchannels of WWOR-TV and WRNN-TV
License	Subchannel	Res.	Short name	Programming
WWOR-TV	9.1	720p	WWOR-TV	Main WWOR-TV programming
WWOR-TV	9.3	480i	Buzzr	Buzzr
WWOR-TV	9.4	480i	Heroes	Heroes & Icons
WRNN-TV	48.1	720p	WRNN-HD	Shop LC
WRNN-TV	48.2	480i	ROAR	Roar
WRNN-TV	48.3	480i	The 365	365BLK
WRNN-TV	48.4	480i	Outlaw	Outlaw
WRNN-TV	48.5	480i	SBN	SonLife

Subchannel broadcast with MPEG-4 video

== See also ==
- WOR (AM) (710 kHz)
- WEPN-FM, the former WOR-FM (98.7 MHz)
- RKO General
- WWOR EMI Service, the national version of WWOR-TV seen outside the New York City TV market from 1990 to 1996
