= National Smokers Alliance =

Defunct smokers' rights advocacy group in the United States

The National Smokers Alliance (NSA) was an organization created and funded by the PR firm Burson-Marsteller, hired by Phillip Morris, in 1993 to protest against anti-smoking legislation in the United States. The NSA was a public relations group created and funded by the tobacco industry, which operated nationally from 1994 to 1999 to advocate for adults using tobacco products without vigorous regulation or increased tobacco taxes. An early example of astroturfing, the NSA employed stealth marketing tactics to give the appearance of grassroots opposition to anti-smoking laws.

One of the NSA's members included famed talk show host Morton Downey Jr.; however, he gave up smoking after being diagnosed with lung cancer in 1996 (and in doing so reversed his smoking stance to an anti-smoking one); he died of the disease in 2001.

In 1999 tobacco company Philip Morris announced that it would withdraw funding after the NSA made an ethics complaint about John McCain.
