= Brenda Blackmon =

TV journalist

Brenda Blackmon is an American anchor based in New York City, best known as one of the main anchors of WWOR from 1990 to 2013. Blackmon most recently anchored the WPIX News weeknights at 6:30 with Kaity Tong. Blackmon joined the station in 2016 as an anchor. As anchor of WWOR, she anchored with Rolland Smith then Sean Mooney then Ernie Anastos and finally Harry Martin.

Before going to New York City, Blackmon worked at WTVF in Nashville, Tennessee and WRBL in Columbus, Georgia where she was the first black anchor. Before becoming a journalist, Blackmon worked as a plus size model. She graduated magna cum laude with a B.A and MPA from Fairleigh Dickinson University, and received honorary doctorates from Caldwell College and Fairleigh Dickinson University. She now is a member of the Fairleigh Dickinson University Board of Trustees.

Blackmon has won four Emmy Awards and has been nominated for 15 Emmys. Blackmon received a broadcasting award from McDonald's in 2010 and WWOR presented a special salute in honor of her career. Her hometown recognized as "One of the Century's Most Influential". Blackmon has also won more than a dozen Associated Press Awards in addition to winning two Edward R. Murrow Awards for Broadcast Excellence.

She joined WWOR in 1990. By 1994, she was the regular anchor, anchoring with many of her co-anchors, such as Mooney, Reg Wells, Smith, and Martin. She anchored during the complete UPN era (1995 - 2006), and then the first 7 years of the MyNetworkTV era (2006 - 2013).

Blackmon is active in community involvement. Blackmon volunteers at SHARE for special events. Brenda was selected as Woman of the Year by Queens Courier News in 2010. Blackmon also received the Shirley Chisholm Award for public service. She is an active participant in the national campaign to find a cure for lupus, through the Alliance for Lupus Research and her foundation, the Kelly Fund For Lupus, Inc.

On December 8, 2015, WPIX announced the hiring of Blackmon to co-anchor their new weeknight 6:30pm newscast with Kaity Tong. Blackmon started on January 11, 2016, but left the station on September 9 after the cancellation of the newscast.

She currently resides in New York.
