= Gennifer Flowers =

American singer, model, and actress (born 1950)

- Born: January 24, 1950 (age 76); Oklahoma City, Oklahoma, U.S.
- Occupations: model; actress; political activist
- Years active: since 1986
- Known for: affair with President Bill Clinton
- Political party: Republican

Gennifer Flowers (born January 24, 1950) is an American author, singer, model, actress, former State of Arkansas employee, and former TV journalist. In January 1998, President Bill Clinton testified under oath that he had a sexual encounter with Flowers.

== Early life ==
Flowers has recounted being nicknamed "Buffles" by schoolmates.

== Bill Clinton controversy ==
During Bill Clinton's 1992 presidential election campaign, Flowers came forward to say that she had had a 12-year extramarital relationship with Clinton, and that he had assisted her in securing a job as an administrative assistant with the Arkansas Appeal Tribunal. The State of Arkansas fired Flowers in early 1992 for failing to show up to work.

After Clinton denied having a relationship with Flowers on 60 Minutes, she held a press conference in which she played tape recordings she had secretly made of phone calls with Clinton. Clinton subsequently apologized publicly to Mario Cuomo for remarks he made about the then-Governor of New York on the tapes, in which he had said that Cuomo acted like a mafioso. During the press conference, Flowers was asked several questions by "Stuttering John" Melendez of the Howard Stern Show: if she was planning to sleep with any other candidates before the election, if Clinton used a condom and if there ever was a threesome. She responded by laughing at Stuttering John's prank, whereas her advisor wanted to ignore him by trying to answer other questions. News reports at the time speculated that the taped phone conversations between Flowers and Clinton could have been doctored; Flowers had sold the original tapes to Star and they were never lab-tested. Clinton aides James Carville and George Stephanopoulos backed the claim the tapes were doctored as well. Stephanopoulos later claimed in a 2000 interview with journalist Tim Russert that "Oh, it was absolutely his voice, but they were selectively edited in a way to – to create some – some impression."

In December 1996, Flowers talked about her sexual relationship with Clinton on The Richard Bey Show. The show was canceled the following day. Bey later attributed a direct connection between the two consecutive events.

In a deposition in January 1998, while denying Kathleen Willey's sexual accusations against him, Clinton admitted that he had a sexual encounter with Flowers. In his 2004 autobiography My Life, Clinton acknowledged testifying under oath that he had a sexual encounter with Flowers. He stated it was only on one occasion in 1977.

Flowers sued Stephanopoulos, Carville, and others in 1999 for defamation (later amending the suit in 2000 to include Hillary Clinton as a defendant), claiming that they orchestrated a campaign to discredit her. Judicial Watch represented her in her defamation lawsuit against Bill Clinton's former aides, Stephanopoulos and Carville. In her case, Flowers argued that the defendants ignored obvious signs that the television news reports did not conclusively determine that someone had interfered with the tapes. Summary judgment dismissing the case was given by a US district court in 2004. The dismissal was affirmed by the U.S. Court of Appeals for the 9th Circuit in 2006.

== Post-controversy years ==
Flowers published her memoir Gennifer Flowers: Passion and Betrayal in 1995. In it, she stated she was a sexual naïf at the time of her alleged relationship with Clinton; The Baltimore Sun's book reviewer credited Flowers with breaking the formerly existing taboo regarding the sexual exploits of sitting politicians. The book's initial print run was 100,000 copies.

In 1992, she starred in the adult-themed television comedy Dream On. She then played herself in Play It to the Bone and various TV shows. In 1998, Flowers appeared at Wrestlemania XIV alongside Jeff Jarrett to serve as a guest ring announcer.

Until Hurricane Katrina, she ran a cabaret called the Kelsto Club in a former bordello in New Orleans' French Quarter. Flowers made her New York theatre debut in 2004, briefly as a replacement in the Off-Broadway hit Boobs! The Musical.

As of 2007, she lived in Las Vegas, Nevada, where she occasionally wrote a column. During this time, she was broadly supportive of the presidential campaign of Hillary Clinton, saying that she wanted to "support my own gender". Flowers also denied that she had "any interest whatsoever in getting back out there and bashing Hillary Clinton."

In 2008, she put what she said were the answering machine tapes of her conversations with Clinton up for auction.

In November 2012, Flowers claimed that Clinton contacted her as recently as 2005. During an interview with Susan Roesgen, Flowers alleged to Roesgen that during her prior sojourn in New Orleans, President Clinton telephoned Flowers while visiting the city and asked for a meeting, which Flowers claims that she declined.

In 2016, Flowers tweeted her support for the presidential campaign of Donald Trump, and was scheduled to attend a televised debate between him and Democratic nominee Hillary Clinton, whom Flowers had supported in 2007. However, the Trump campaign canceled the invitation after his initial offer.

== Filmography ==
- The War Room (1993), herself
- Play It to the Bone (1999), herself
- Definitely, Maybe (2008), herself

== Television appearances ==
- The Howard Stern Show, herself – in "Episode dated 1 February 1992" (1992)
- Dream On – in the episode "And Bimbo Was His Name-O" (1992)
- The Richard Bey Show, herself – in the episode "Clinton Scandals" (1996). The show was cancelled the following day and Richard Bey later attributed a direct connection between the two consecutive events
- WrestleMania XIV (1998), herself
- The Frank Skinner Show, herself – in episode #2.7 (1998)
- Where Are They Now? (VH1 TV series), herself – in the episode "Notorious & Newsworthy" (2000)
- Weakest Link (US), herself – in the episode "Newsmakers Edition" (2001)
- News with a Twist on WGNO (November 20, 2012)
- Oprah: Where Are They Now? on OWN Network, herself (March 16, 2013)

== Bibliography ==
- Passion and Betrayal (1996)
- Sleeping With the President (1998)
