= Last Request (2006 film) =

- Directed by: John DeBellis
- Screenplay by: John DeBellis
- Production companies: Last Request; Reinvented Films; West End Media LLC
- Distributed by: Front Row Filmed Entertainment (2007) (UAE) (all media); MTI Home Video (all media); Peacock Films (2010) (Australia) (DVD); Sunfilm Entertainment (2011) (Germany) (DVD)
- Release date: 2006
- Running time: 90 minutes
- Country: United States
- Language: English
- Budget: $1.20 million (estimated)

Last Request is a 2006 American comedy written and directed by John DeBellis. The film features T. R. Knight, as a son who leaves the seminary responding to the last request of his father Danny Aiello to find a wife and prolong the family name.

== Cast ==
- T. R. Knight as Jeff
- Danny Aiello as Pop (Jeff’s father)
- Mario Cantone as Mr. Oliver
- Frank Vincent as Father Brice
- Sabrina Lloyd as Cathy
- Joe Piscopo as Angelo
- Vincent Pastore as Father Patton
- Tony Lo Bianco as Monte
- Barbara Feldon as Mom (Jeff’s mother)
- Mary Birdsong as Marlene
- Gilbert Gottfried as Bum
- Nick Scotti as Tom
- Mike Rutkoski as Mr. Pitiful
- Virginia Williams as Nancy Dalton
- Irma St. Paule as Grandma
- Bobby Alto as Dr. Davis
- Tristan Carrasco as The Godmother of Sex
- Miranda Black as Karen
- Vinny Marz as Shoemaker
- Iris Almario as Maria Luna
- Greta Tyson as Faye
- Joseph DeBellis as Senior Crunner
- Adam Ferrara as Cousin Frank
- Mike Rutkoskie as Mr. Pitiful
- Joan Copeland as Alice Rudolf
- John Hoyt as Big Joe
- Bill Rutkoski as Dr. Jiffy
