= Morton Downey Jr. Sings =

Studio album by Morton Downey Jr.
- Released: 1989
- Recorded: 1988
- Genre: Rock, pop, country rock
- Language: English
- Label: Compose Records; Peter Pan Industries

Morton Downey Jr. Sings is an album by talk show host Morton Downey Jr. released in 1989.

When released it had advanced orders of more than 500,000 copies.

Downey promoted the album by performing the song "Hey Mr. Dealer" on an episode of The Arsenio Hall Show.

== Reception ==
The Los Angeles Times called it the worst album of the 1980s.

The New York Times said, "Mr. Downey's singing is in the gruff country mode of Johnny Cash and Kris Kristofferson but lacks the emphatic firmness of tone and pitch that gives even spoken monologues by those singers an underlying sense of musical cadence. Morton Downey Jr. Sings is anything but subtle."

The New York Times also said the music qualified as country pop.

In 2016, the album came in at #2 on a "Top 10 Musical Oddities" list for the Alternative Nation website.

== Track listing ==
No.	Title	Length
1.	"Blue Collar King"	4:30
2.	"Operate, Operate"	2:56
3.	"Old Man"	4:17
4.	"Hey Mr. Dealer"	2:35
5.	"Mr. Yuppie's Birthday Party"	3:28
6.	"Last American Hero"	2:56
7.	"Senator Paperman"	3:08
8.	"Lawyer Named Sue"	2:58
9.	"Lady of the Night"	4:28
10.	"Solution to Pollution"	4:48
11.	"Zip It"	2:40
