= Evil (band) =

American garage rock band

Background information
- Origin: Miami, Florida, United States
- Genres: Garage rock, rock and roll, proto-punk
- Years active: 1965–1967
- Labels: Capitol, Living Legend, Norton, Corduroy, Florida Archive Recordings
- Past members: John Doyle; Stan Kinchen; Doug Romanella; Jeff Allen; Larry O'Connell; Al Banyai; Mike Hughes; John Dalton

Evil was a garage rock band from Miami, Florida, active between late 1965 and early 1967. They were known for a hard-driving, sometimes thrashing 60s punk sound that combined elements of blues, rockabilly, and British Invasion influences (particularly the tougher-sounding, London-based outfits of the time, such as The Yardbirds, The Who, The Pretty Things, and The Small Faces). They recorded several songs, amongst which “Always Runnin' Around” and “Whatcha Gonna Do” were released as a single under Living Legend Records in 1966. The band eventually signed to Capitol Records but broke up shortly thereafter. In more recent years, they have been noted for several previously unreleased songs recorded in 1966, which have been released under various independent labels from acetates, such as "From a Curbstone," "Short Life," and especially "I'm Movin' On," which is now regarded as a garage classic.

Stan Kinchen formed the band in 1965 and played lead guitar on most of their recordings. One night that year, after dance, Al Banyai, the band's rhythm guitarist asked John Doyle to join as lead singer. Doyle would come up with the name of the band: "We were looking for something dark and scary. We were all into Edgar Allan Poe, almost named the band that, then Raven, then just EVIL! The story is that we named it after the blues tune..." Later in 1965, Larry O' Connell joined the band as its bassist, and Doug Romanella joined on drums. In March 1966, after winning WFUN's annual Dade County Youth Fair Battle Of The Bands, the band was awarded a chance to make several recordings in a one-day marathon session at the Dukoff Recording Studios in Miami, where they cut several demos and acetates. Among the self-penned songs recorded were "I'm Movin' On," "From a Curbstone," "Short Life," and Always Runnin' Around.

Later that year, Al Banyai, Larry O'Connell, and Doug Romanella departed from the band and were replaced by John Dalton (rhythm guitar), Mike Hughes (bass), and Jeff Allen (drums). Allen joined after the breakup of his former group, another Miami band, The Montells. He would occasionally travel to England, where he went to clubs and watched many of the latest British bands' live performances; he would then bring his observations back home to share with fellow band members. In late 1966, Evil recorded again in Miami, this time at Criteria Studios, with their version of The Small Faces' "Whacha Gonna Do." “Always Runnin' Around” and “Whatcha Gonna Do” were released as a single on Living Legend Records in late 1966. By the end of that year, they signed to Capitol Records, who re-released the same single on their own label, with the band's name mistakenly printed as "The Evil." Shortly after, in 1967, the band broke up.

In 2010, drummer Jeff Allen died. On February 14, 2014, former lead singer, John Doyle, also passed.

== Personnel ==
First Lineup (1965–1966)

- John Doyle - Lead Singer
- Stan Kinchen - Lead Guitar
- Al Banyai - Rhythm Guitar
- Larry O'Connell - Bass
- Doug Romanella - Drums

Second Lineup (1966–1967)

- John Doyle - vocals
- Stan Kinchen - lead guitar
- John Dalton - rhythm guitar
- Mike Hughes - bass
- Jeff Allen - drums

== Discography ==
=== Singles ===
- "Always Runnin' Around"/ "Whatcha Gonna Do" (Living Legend LL-108, rel. 1967; Capitol 2038, rel. 1967)
- "I’m Movin' On" (Evil)/"You Can’t Make Me" (The Montells) (Norton 826–8, rec. 1966, rel. 1997)
- "From a Curbstone"/"Short Life" (Florida Archive Recordings F.A.R. 6601, rec. 1966, rel. 2012)

=== Albums ===
- The Montells/Evil (Corduroy, Cord 027, rel. 1997 on LP) (includes songs: "Don't Put Me Down" and "I Know I'll Die")
