= Anita Boyer =

American singer (1915–1985)

- Born: Anita Blanch Boyer; October 25, 1915; Carmi, Illinois, U.S.
- Died: March 17, 1985 (aged 69) South Miami, Florida, U.S.
- Genres: Big band, traditional pop, jazz, R&B
- Occupations: Singer, songwriter
- Instrument: Vocals
- Years active: 1930s–1955
- Labels: Tempo, Columbia

Anita Blanch Boyer Dukoff, known as Anita Boyer (25 October 1915 in Carmi, Illinois – 17 March 1985 in South Miami, Florida) was an American singer of the Big Band Era, described by Billboard as "one of the music business's most proficient canaries". She was noted for performances with Tommy Dorsey (1939), Leo Reisman (1940–41), Artie Shaw (1940), Nat King Cole (1941–44), Jerry Wald (1942–43) and Hoagy Carmichael (1945). With Dorsey she helped popularize the song "I Concentrate On You", and with Reisman she recorded the song "Bewitched, Bothered and Bewildered" for Pal Joey.

In the 1950s, Boyer became a songwriter, and she wrote songs such as "I Foresee In the Future" and "I Gambled with Love" with Paul Weirick in 1954. She finally settled in the Miami area with her second husband, saxophonist, composer, audio engineer and mouthpiece maker Bobby Dukoff.

== Early life and work ==
Boyer was born in Carmi, Illinois on 25 October 1915. Her father was a surgeon in the Army. She began as a singer on the WMSK radio station in Dayton, Ohio, before enrolling in a voice course at Northwestern University in Chicago. Before she finished her course, she signed with Frankie Masters. She began singing on other radio shows, joined Chicago radio station WGN and joined the New York theatre circuit.

== Career ==
Boyer married trumpeter Dick Barrie in 1934, and in April 1936 she began singing with his new band. By this time she had become known for her singing on the NBC Jamboree, Funnybone Follies, Cinderella on Broadway and various Mutual Network shows. Boyer made a number of recordings with Barrie until she left the band in the summer of 1939. She had divorced Barrie by the end of 1941. In October 1939 Boyer replaced Edythe Wright as the Tommy Dorsey Orchestra's singer. Though their recording of "I Concentrate on You" was popular and helped popularize the tune, the appointment was short-lived, and she left in January 1940 to sign with Paramount Pictures to appear in several musical short films. After briefly singing with Nat Shilkret from April 1940 and Leo Reisman from July 1940, in the September she joined Artie Shaw's band. Boyer rejoined Reisman early in 1941, made several solo recordings, including "Bewitched, Bothered and Bewildered" for Pal Joey, and featured on CBS and NBC radio.

Boyer and "Her Tomboyers" recorded with the King Cole Trio between 1941 and 1944. Before Christmas 1941, Boyer recorded "Get Hep" and a version of Pepsi's tune "Swinging the Jingle" with the Johnny Fosdick Orchestra and released it as a single, but both songs contained mentions of Pepsi and dukebox operators shunned the record for blatant advertising. She performed with Glen Gray and the Casa Loma Orchestra at Christmas, featuring at the Strand Theater in Syracuse, New York. She toured with the Casa Loma Orchestra in early 1942 and joined Jerry Wald in May. Billboard described the red-haired singer as a "charming miss" after performing with Wald's band at RKO-Boston in October 1942, noting her performances of "Hip Hip Hooray" and "I Wonder When My Baby's Coming Home". While performing with Wald's band in Cleveland, Ohio the same month, $1800 in jewelry, $100 in war bonds, and two bankbooks were stolen from her room at the Carter Hotel.

Boyer left Wald's band in early 1943 and was signed as a regular on the "Keep Ahead show" at New York station WOR in the February as a singer for Ray Bloch and his band. Down Beat magazine employed Boyer as a columnist in a section called "Boyer's Browsings" between late 1942 and 1944, in which she gave advice on singing and maintaining a career and marriage in the industry. In July 1943, Boyer married saxophonist Bobby Dukoff in Toledo, after meeting him while performing with Wald's band. After several performances with CBS, she left the industry for about a year, only briefly filling in as replacement vocalist for Helen Ward with the Hal McIntyre orchestra in the October. In the summer of 1944 Boyer was singing with Jimmy Dorsey's band, and in the November she relocated to California with her husband, so he could pursue a composing career and radio work.

In 1945, Boyer sang and recorded with Hoagy Carmichael's orchestra, releasing a recording of "How Little We Know" in June of that year. She replaced Kitty Kallen as the singer for the Harry James Orchestra for about six weeks from the November. In early 1946, she recorded with Peggy Lee for the Walt Disney animated picture Make Mine Music. She sang with Opie Cates and worked with Red Nichols. The St. Louis Globe-Democrat of St. Louis, Missouri described her as being on "fine fettle", praising her vocals on "You Satisfy" in an August 1946 performance with Nichol's group.

== Later career ==
On May 17, 1947, Boyer gave birth to a daughter and retired from the industry, though made several recordings with Tempo Records in 1948. She later relaunched her career in the 1950s as a songwriter and singing on the night club circuit. Country music star Grandpa Jones recorded one of her songs. She wrote songs such as "I Foresee In the Future" and "I Gambled with Love" with Paul Weirick in 1954. Boyer had her own radio show on the Mutual network in 1952 to 1953 and recorded with the Sauter-Finegan Orchestra in 1953. She recorded several R&B songs for Columbia Records in 1955.

Boyer and her husband finally settled in the Miami area, where Dukoff found work as both a musician and audio engineer, opening a studio at their home in Kendall, Florida. The couple had one daughter, Deerdra, and three grandchildren: Kristina, Robert and Brandon. In 1974, her husband resumed his saxophone mouthpiece business from his workshop in Kendall. Boyer died on 17 March 1985 in South Miami, Florida.
