= John DeBellis =

American screenwriter

John DeBellis is an American writer, director and stand-up comedian best known for his work on Saturday Night Live and Politically Incorrect. In addition he wrote and directed the 2006 film Last Request and is a frequent contributor to The Huffington Post. He has written the book Standup Guys about his rising star friends including Larry David, Richard Lewis, Richard Belzer, Bill Maher, Gilbert Gottfried, Rita Rudner, Joe Piscopo, Paul Reiser, and Jerry Seinfeld.
