= Arkansas Appeal Tribunal =

State agency of Arkansas

The Arkansas Appeal Tribunal is a state agency of the Government of Arkansas. Persons unsatisfied with unemployment insurance (UI) determinations issued by the Arkansas Division of Workforce Services may appeal to the Arkansas Appeal Tribunal within 20 days. (Note: "Your appeal must be received by the Arkansas Appeal Tribunal or a local DWS office within the 20-day appeal period") The Tribunal holds hearings.

The Appeal Tribunal is based in Little Rock. In 1989, the Tribunal had a staff of about 30 and was funded by, but separate from, the Arkansas Employment Security Division. The Arkansas Employment Security Division was renamed the Arkansas Department of Workforce Services (ADWS) in 2005. In 2019, following a state government reorganization, the Department of Workforce Services became the Division of Workforce Services within the Arkansas Department of Commerce.

In late 2020, a slowdown in the processing of UI appeals was attributed to the COVID-19 pandemic in Arkansas.

Decisions of the Arkansas Appeal Tribunal are subject to further review by the Arkansas Board of Review, (Note: "A further appeal may be made to the Arkansas Board of Review") which can be further reviewed by the Arkansas Court of Appeals.
