= Sara Lee Kessler =

American journalist

Sara Lee Kessler (born 1951) is the former anchor for New York City's Channel 9 nightly local broadcast news program in the late 1980s and early 1990s. She was formerly a health reporter for New Jersey Network's nightly half hour NJN News broadcast. She currently reports for iHeartRadio and NBC News Radio.

== Working with WWOR-TV ==
Kessler was hired by the NY area station WOR-TV, channel 9 (which later became WWOR-TV ) in 1976 as a reporter and became co-anchor of "News at Noon," with anchorman Tom Dunn later that year. She also co-anchored the station's "News 9 PrimeTime," which was an 8 PM newscast, from 1983-1987. When WWOR-TV switched to a 10 PM newscast in late 1987, Kessler became solo anchor of the "News at Noon." She also co-hosted "9 Broadcast Plaza," a 3-hour live daily news/chat program from 1989–1991, joined by future Today Show co-host Matt Lauer. She continued as anchor of "News at Noon" until the newscast was cancelled and then became a weekend news anchor and reporter for "News at Ten." Kessler won an Emmy Award for anchoring WWOR-TV's coverage of the 1993 World Trade Center bombing.

In 1994, Kessler was fired by WWOR. She subsequently sued the television station for religious discrimination, among other charges. Kessler, who is an Orthodox Jewish woman, claimed that she was forced to work on Saturdays, which is forbidden by the Jewish religion. She was later able to successfully sue the station for $7.3 million.

Kessler was among the first journalists to interview John Lennon when he received a green card after years of fighting U.S. government efforts to deport him.

She has been a resident of Englewood, New Jersey for more than 20 years.
