= The Morton Downey Jr. Show =

American TV talk show (1987–1989)

- Show logo
- Also known as: The Morton Downey Show
- Starring: Morton Downey Jr.
- Country of origin: United States

Production
- Running time: 60 minutes
- Production companies: QMI Television; WWOR-TV; MCA-TV

Original release
- Network: WWOR (1987–1988); Syndicated (1988–1989)
- Release: October 19, 1987 – September 15, 1989

The Morton Downey Jr. Show was a syndicated American talk show presented by Morton Downey Jr. that ran from 1987 to 1989. The show and its host pioneered the concept of "trash TV" format.

Starting as a local program on New York-New Jersey superstation WWOR in October 1987, it expanded into national syndication in January 1988. The show was a co-production of WWOR and QMI Television, a division of Quantum Media, and was distributed by MCA Television; at the time, MCA Television and WWOR were both owned by Universal Pictures.

== Style ==
The program featured screaming matches among Downey, his guests, and audience members. Using a large silver bowl for an ashtray, he would chainsmoke during the show and blow smoke in his guests' faces. Downey's fans became known as "Loudmouths", patterned after the studio lecterns decorated with gaping cartoon mouths, from which Downey's guests would go head-to-head against each other on their respective issues.

Downey's signature phrases "pablum puking liberal" (referring to left leaning progressives) and "Zip it!" briefly enjoyed some popularity in the contemporary vernacular. He particularly enjoyed making his guests angry with each other, which on a few occasions resulted in physical confrontations. For example, one time, American activist and politician Roy Innis knocked away American civil rights activist Al Sharpton for interrupting him, forcing the both of them to engage in an all-out brawl. Despite the incident, Downey Jr. decided to keep the show going, though he did not press charges on either Innis or Sharpton for aggravated assault.

During one controversial episode, Downey introduced his gay brother, Tony Downey, to his studio audience and informed them Tony was HIV positive. During the episode, Downey stated he was afraid his audience would abandon him if they knew he had a gay brother, but then said he did not care.

He was considered a pioneer of the trash talk format along with The Richard Bey Show, with Richard Bey who appeared in a documentary about Downey in 2012.

== Reception ==
Downey gained a mixed to negative reception from television critics. 'The Washington Post wrote about him, "Suppose a maniac got hold of a talk show. Or need we suppose?" David Letterman said, "I'm always amazed at what people will fall for. We see this every 10 or 12 years, an attempt at this, and I guess from that standpoint I don't quite understand why everybody's falling over backwards over the guy."

In 2012 a documentary about the show was released called Évocateur: The Morton Downey Jr. Movie.

== Cancellation ==
Despite starting out with 78 stations and a nationwide audience through WWOR’s EMI Service, the ratings for Downey’s program never stayed high enough for those stations to continue airing it. The program stopped taping new episodes in June 1989 and a cancellation notice came shortly after; Downey had offered to change his show to a weekly offering but Quantum Media, MCA, and WWOR would not agree. The show ceased distribution on September 15; it had been estimated that 75% of the stations airing Downey did not renew their contract with MCA to continue carrying it.
