= Bobby Dukoff =

American musician (1918–2012)

Robert Dukoff (October 11, 1918 – May 3, 2012), known as Bobby Dukoff, was an American Big Band tenor saxophonist, clarinetist, composer, audio engineer and saxophone mouthpiece maker. He is known for his Dukoff Mouthpieces, which he began producing commercially in Los Angeles in 1945, and later in Miami from the mid-1970s.

During the Swing Era, Dukoff worked in the bands of Jerry Wald, Jimmy Dorsey and Benny Goodman. He married singer Anita Boyer in 1943. In the 1950s he was signed to RCA Victor where he made a number of albums, such as Sax in Silk, which was in the top-ten best selling albums of the label in 1956, Sax and Satin, Pure Sax and Off the Cuff. At RCA he developed as an audio engineer and worked with Charlie Parker. He later opened Dukoff Recording Studios in North Miami, and worked with artists such as the Montells, Timmy Thomas and James Brown in the 1960s and 1970s.

== Early life and Big Band career ==
Dukoff was born in Worcester, Massachusetts in 1918, and grew up in Sioux City, Iowa and Mount Vernon, New York. He bought his first saxophone at the age of 14 in Mount Vernon, and by the late 1930s was playing in the Duke band in New York and touring with the Carl Hoff Band. In New York he joined the Jerry Wald band. Larry Elgart once stated that "Jerry was like a clone of Artie (Shaw). He hired a lot of guys from the Shaw band. It was a good band with a lot of fine musicians, like tenor saxist Bobby Dukoff and guitarist Art Ryerson." Dukoff subsequently worked with Jimmy Dorsey and Benny Goodman. While working at the New Yorker Hotel with Goodman he also worked with a young Frank Sinatra.

In July 1943 he married singer Anita Boyer in Toledo, Ohio, after the couple had met in Jerry Wald's band. The couple moved to California, with Dukoff looking to continue with his performing career but also concentrate on producing transcriptions and composing.

== Recording and audio engineering career ==
In 1949 or 1950, Dukoff moved back to New York City with his wife, where Dukoff signed on as a solo artist with RCA Victor. His record as part of the Bobby Dukoff Orchestra, Sax in Silk, was in the top-ten best selling albums of the label in 1956. The album features standards such as "My Melancholy Baby", Tenderly, "It's The Talk Of The Town", "I Can't Give You Anything But Love", Body and Soul and "Let's Fall In Love". He also recorded albums such as Sax and Satin, Pure Sax and Off the Cuff. Sax and Satin (1956) was recorded with the Ray Charles Chorus and features standards such as "Tea for Two, "I Thought About You", "This Love of Mine", and "Stardust".

As an audio engineer at RCA, Dukoff worked with Charlie Parker. He had previous experience working with Parker as a studio musician on his July 1946 recording of "Be-Bop" with Dizzy Gillespie, which was Parker's last session for six months while he was treated at Camarillo State Hospital. He also released some material as an educator in his Bobby Dukoff Presents... series, such as his How to learn to play the clarinet from electrical recordings or phonograph records (1957).

Dukoff established the Dukoff Recording Inc. company in 1957. With his wife he moved to the Miami area, where he opened the Dukoff Recording Studios in North Miami in the former Food Fair building. In May 1965, The Montells recorded their first single "Don't Bring Me Down" previously recorded by British group the Pretty Things, at the studio. In 1972, Timmy Thomas recorded "Why Can't We Live Together" at Dukoff's studio, and James Brown also made numerous recordings there. Dukoff won awards from the Miami Advertising Club and United Fund for radio jingles which were written and produced by his company.

Dukoff and Anita Boyer had one daughter, Deerdra, and three grandchildren: Kristina, Robert and Brandon. Boyer died in 1985. In 2001, at the age of 83, Dukoff remarried Jeanne Cook, whom he remained with until his death in 2012.

== Dukoff Mouthpieces ==
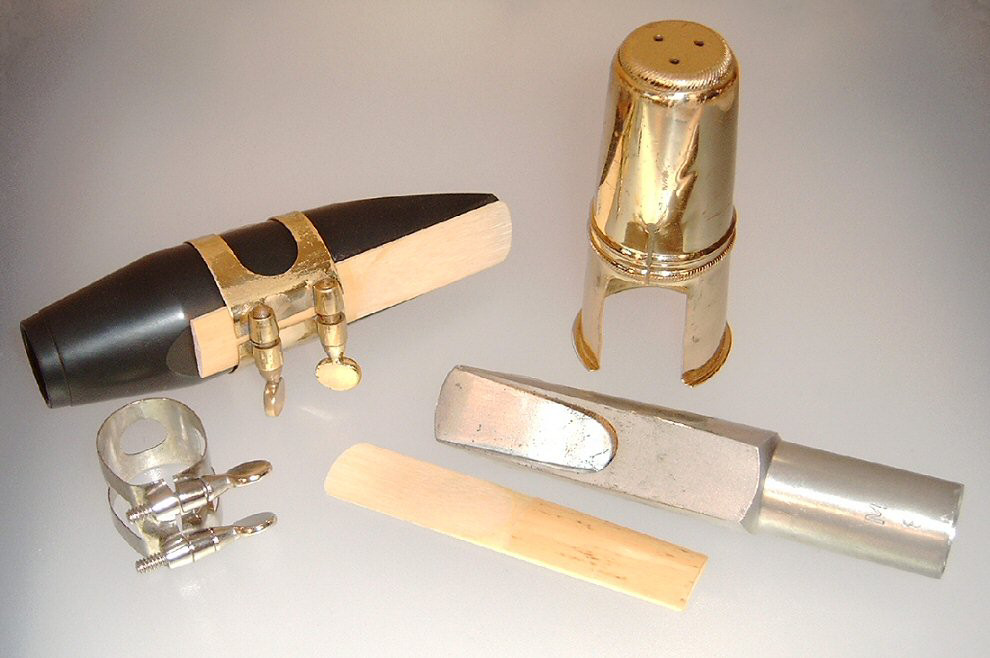
Dukoff Super Power Chamber M8 mouthpiece

Dukoff's mouthpieces for saxophones have been used by numerous saxophonists, including Dexter Gordon, Boots Randolph, Michael Brecker and David Sanborn to Kenny G. He designed his first mouthpiece in 1943, and produced them commercially in Los Angeles from 1945 to 1949. The brass mouthpieces, in the Otto Link style, with a "round medium chamber and flat inner side walls" and "white bite-plates and serial numbers" have a distinct tone and were used by Dexter Gordon from this period until the 1960s. In 1974, Dukoff resumed his mouthpiece business commercially from his workshop in Kendall, Florida, and in the 1990s formed a partnership with Nicholas Hernandez. The mouthpieces are highly regarded and have been recommended by publications such as WoodWind World and JazzTimes magazine.
