= Morton Downey Jr. =

American television talk show host (1932–2001)

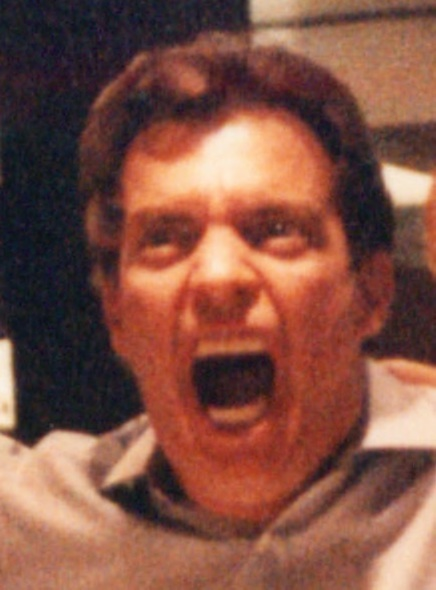
- Downey in the 1980s
- Born: Sean Morton Downey; December 9, 1932; Los Angeles, California, U.S.
- Died: March 12, 2001 (aged 68); Los Angeles, California, U.S.
- Occupations: Talk show host, actor
- Spouse(s): Helen Marie Rowan (m. 1954; div. 1959) Joan Tyrrell (m. 1962; div. 1978) Kim Cotten (m. 1978; div. 1989) Lori Krebs (m. 1993)
- Children: 4
- Parents: Morton Downey; Barbara Bennett
- Relatives: Tony Downey (brother); Richard Bennett (grandfather); Adrienne Morrison (grandmother); Lewis Morrison (great-grandfather); Constance Bennett (aunt); Joan Bennett (aunt)

Sean Morton Downey (December 9, 1932 – March 12, 2001), better known as Morton Downey Jr., was an American television talk show host and actor who pioneered the "trash TV" format in the late 1980s on his program The Morton Downey Jr. Show.

== Early life ==
Downey's roots were in show business; his father, Morton Downey, was a popular singer, and his mother, Barbara Bennett, was a stage and film actress and singer and dancer. His aunts included Hollywood film stars Constance and Joan Bennett, and his maternal grandfather was matinée idol Richard Bennett. His wealthy family spent their summers next door to the Kennedy compound in Hyannis Port, Massachusetts. Downey attended New York University.

== Career ==
Downey worked as a program director and announcer at radio station WPOP in Hartford, Connecticut, in the 1950s. He went on to work as a disc jockey, sometimes using the moniker "Doc" Downey, in various markets around the U.S., including Phoenix (KRIZ), Miami (WFUN), Kansas City (KUDL), San Diego (KDEO) and Seattle (KJR). He had to resign from WFUN after drawing ire from the FCC for announcing a competing disc jockey's home phone number on the air and insulting his wife. Like his father, Downey pursued a career in music, recording in both pop and country styles. He sang on a few records and then began to write songs, several of which were popular in the 1950s and 1960s. In 1958, he recorded "Boulevard of Broken Dreams", which he sang on national television on a set that resembled a dark street with one street light. In 1981, "Green Eyed Girl" charted on the Billboard country chart, peaking at No. 95.

In the 1980s, Downey became a talk show host at KFBK-AM in Sacramento, California, where he employed an abrasive style. He was fired in 1984, and was subsequently replaced by Rush Limbaugh. He also had a stint on WMAQ-AM in Chicago where he unsuccessfully tried to get other on air radio personalities to submit to drug testing. Downey's largest effect on American culture came from his syndicated late-1980s television talk show, The Morton Downey Jr. Show.

=== Anti-abortion activism ===
On January 22, 1980, Downey, a devoted anti-abortionist, hosted the California State Rally for Life at the invitation of the California ProLife Council and United Students for Life. At that time, he was also running for President of the United States, as a Democrat. The United Students for Life, at California State University, Sacramento helped organize his California presidential rallies. Downey worked to help promote anti-abortion candidates in California and around the country.

American Independent Party – California Presidential Primary, 1980
Candidate	# Votes	% Votes
Morton Downey Jr.	10,838	51.11
John R. Rarick	10,358	48.85
Others	9	0.04
Total	21,205	100.00

=== Television ===
Downey headed to Secaucus, New Jersey, where his television program The Morton Downey Jr. Show was taped. Starting as a local program on New York–New Jersey superstation WWOR-TV in October 1987, it expanded into national syndication in early 1988. The program featured screaming matches among Downey, his guests, and audience members. Using a large silver bowl for an ashtray, he would chainsmoke during the show and blow smoke in his guests' faces. Downey's fans became known as "Loudmouths", patterned after the studio lecterns decorated with gaping cartoon mouths, from which Downey's guests would go head-to-head against each other on their respective issues.

On a few occasions, his attempts to provoke outbursts on his show resulted in physical confrontations. One such incident occurred on a 1988 show taped at the Apollo Theater, involving Al Sharpton and CORE National Chairman Roy Innis. The exchange between the two men culminated in Innis shoving Sharpton and knocking him to the floor, and Downey intervening to separate the pair.

Because of the controversial format and content of the show, distributor MCA Television had problems selling the show to a number of stations and advertisers. Even Downey's affiliates, many of which were low-rated independent television stations in small to medium markets, were so fearful of advertiser and viewer backlash that they would air one or even two local disclaimers during the broadcast.

During one controversial episode Downey introduced his gay brother, Tony Downey, to his studio audience and informed them Tony was HIV positive. During the episode Downey stated he was afraid his audience would abandon him if they knew he had a gay brother, but then said he did not care.

The Washington Post wrote about him, "Suppose a maniac got hold of a talk show. Or need we suppose?"

David Letterman said, "I'm always amazed at what people will fall for. We see this every ten or twelve years, an attempt at this, and I guess from that standpoint I don't quite understand why everybody's falling over backwards over the guy."

=== Celebrity, cancellation, and bankruptcy ===
The success of the show made Downey a pop culture celebrity, leading to appearances on Saturday Night Live in 1988, WrestleMania V in 1989 in which he traded insults with Roddy Piper and Brother Love on Piper's Pit, and later roles in movies such as Predator 2 and Revenge of the Nerds III: The Next Generation. He was also cast in several television roles, often playing tabloid TV hosts or other obnoxious media types. Downey notably starred in the Tales from the Crypt episode "Television Terror" which utilized several scenes shot by characters within the story, a format which became popular in horror films a decade later with the found-footage genre. In 1993, on the Canadian crime-fighting series Counterstrike, Downey portrayed Monroe Park, host of the controversial news-talk show The Raw Truth, which he uses to slander Senator David Carmichael (Stephen Young) who dies on an icy road while being chased by a journalist named Betty, played by Downey's wife Lori Krebs.

In 1989, Downey released an album of songs based on his show entitled Morton Downey Jr. Sings. The album's single, "Zip It!" (a catch-phrase from the TV show, used to quiet an irate guest), became a surprise hit on some college radio stations. However, over the course of the 1988–89 television season, his TV show suffered a decline in viewership, resulting in many markets downgrading its time slot; even flagship station WWOR moved Downey's program from its original 9:00 p.m. slot to 11:30 p.m. in the fall of 1988. Beginning in January 1989, the time slot immediately following Downey's program was given to the then-new Arsenio Hall Show. Following Hall's strong early ratings, however, the two series swapped time slots several weeks later, thus relegating Downey to 12:30 a.m. in the number-one television market.

In late April 1989, Downey was involved in an incident in a San Francisco International Airport restroom in which he claimed to have been attacked by neo-Nazis who painted a swastika on his face and attempted to shave his head. Some inconsistencies in Downey's account (e.g., the swastika was painted in reverse, suggesting that Downey had drawn it himself in a mirror), and the failure of the police to find supportive evidence, led many to suspect the incident was a hoax and a ploy for attention. In July 1989, his show was canceled, with the owners of the show announcing that the last episode had been taped on June 30, and that no new shows would air after September 15, 1989.

At the time of its cancellation, the show was airing on a total of 70 stations across the country, and its advertisers had been reduced primarily to "direct-response" ads (such as 900 chat-line and phone sex numbers). In February 1990, Downey filed for bankruptcy in the US Bankruptcy Court for the District of New Jersey.

=== Later career ===
In 1990, Downey resurfaced on CNBC with an interview program called Showdown, which was followed by three attempted talk radio comebacks: first in 1992 on Washington, D.C. radio station WWRC; then in 1993 on Dallas radio station KGBS, where he would scream insults at his callers. He was also hired as the station's VP of Operations. The following year, he returned to CNBC with a television show, Downey, which was also carried by some broadcast stations; in one episode, Downey claimed to have had a psychic communication with O. J. Simpson's murdered ex-wife, Nicole Brown Simpson.

His third—and final—attempt at a talk radio comeback occurred in 1997 on Cleveland radio station WTAM in a late evening time slot. It marked his return to the Cleveland market, where Downey had been a host for crosstown radio station WERE in the early 1980s, prior to joining KFBK. This stint came shortly after the surgery for lung cancer that removed one of his lungs. At WTAM, Downey abandoned the confrontational schtick of his TV and previous radio shows, and conducted this program in a much more conversational and jovial manner.

On August 30, 1997, Downey quit his WTAM show to focus on pursuing legal action against Howard Stern. Downey had accused Stern of spreading rumors that he had resumed his smoking habit, to which publicist Les Schecter retorted, "He hasn't picked up a cigarette." His replacement was former WERE host Rick Gilmour.

Following his death, news reports and obituaries incorrectly (according to the Orange County Register) credited him as the composer of "Wipe Out." As of 2008, Downey's official website (and others) continue to make this claim. Prior to Downey's death, Spin in April 1989 had identified the Wipe Out authorship as a myth.

=== Controversies ===
In 1984, at KFBK radio, Downey used the word "Chinaman" while telling a joke. His use of the word upset portions of the sizable Asian community in Sacramento. One Asian-American city councilman called for an apology and pressured the station for Downey's resignation. Downey refused to apologize and was forced to resign.

Downey was sued for allegedly appropriating the words and music to his theme song from two songwriters. He was sued for $40 million after bringing then-stripper Kellie Everts onto the show and calling her a "slut", a "pig", a "hooker", and a "tramp", saying she had venereal diseases, and banging his pelvis against hers.

In April 1988, he was arraigned on criminal charges for allegedly attacking a gay guest on his show, in a never-aired segment. In another lawsuit, he was accused of slandering a newscaster (a former colleague), and of indecently exposing himself to her and slapping her. Downey punched Stuttering John during an interview done for The Howard Stern Show, while also shouting verbal insults at John, referring to him as an "uneducated slob". The situation then began to evolve into a brawl between the two until Downey had to be pulled off of John by security; the entire incident was caught on camera. When an Inside Edition camera crew approached Downey in 1989 to question him about his involvement in an alleged business scam, Downey grabbed the boom mike and struck the soundman's head with it.

In his later years, Downey expressed remorse for some of the extreme theatrics of his TV show, as well as various incidents outside the studio, including the Inside Edition confrontation. However, he also said his show was of a higher quality than and not as "sleazy" as Jerry Springer's show.

== Personal life ==
Downey was married four times and had four children from three of those marriages. With wife Helen, he had daughter, Melissa; with Joan, he had daughters, Tracey and Kelli; and, with fourth wife Lori Krebs, he had daughter, Seanna Micaela. He and Lori met when she appeared as a dancer in a show he attended in Atlantic City. According to Terry Pluto's book, Loose Balls, Downey (going by Sean at the time) was one of the owners of the New Orleans Buccaneers basketball team in the American Basketball Association in the late 1960s. He was also president and co-founder of the proposed World Baseball Association in 1974.

== Death ==
In June 1996, while being treated for pneumonia, Downey was diagnosed with lung cancer and had part of his right lung removed. His views on tobacco use changed substantially, going from a one-time member of the National Smokers Alliance to a staunch anti-smoking activist. He continued to speak against smoking until his death from lung cancer and pneumonia on March 12, 2001.

After being diagnosed with lung cancer, he commented:

I had spawned a generation of kids to think it was cool to smoke a cigarette. Kids walked up to me until a matter of weeks ago, they'd have a cigarette in their hand and they'd say, 'Hey, Mort,' or, 'Hey, Mouth, autograph my cigarette.' And I'd do it.

He also blamed tobacco companies for lying to consumers about cigarettes.

== Legacy ==
In 1998, a Golden Palm Star on the Palm Springs, California, Walk of Stars was dedicated to him.

Released in 2012, the documentary film Évocateur: The Morton Downey Jr. Movie touches upon Downey's upbringing and formative years in radio and politics before launching into the history of The Morton Downey Jr. Show and Downey's influence on trash TV. The film also looks at Downey's relationship with Al Sharpton and other important 80s figures.

The Super Mario character, Morton Koopa Jr. was named after him. The character first made his debut in the 1988 game Super Mario Bros. 3 as a member of the Koopalings, who are boss characters who work for Bowser, the main antagonist.

== Filmography ==
Morton Downey Jr. film and television acting credits
Year	Title	Role	Notes	Ref.
1978	Born Again	Classroom Guard	Theatrical film	
1989	1st & Ten	TV Show Host	1 episode	
1990	Tales from the Crypt	Horton Rivers	Episode: "Television Terror"	
1990	Predator 2	Tony Pope	Theatrical film	
1990	Thanksgiving Day	Unknown	Television film	
1991	Monsters	Ray Brigh	Episode: "A Face for Radio"	
1991	Driving Me Crazy	Taj	Theatrical film	
1991	Legal Tender	Mal Connery	Theatrical film	
1992	Revenge of the Nerds III: The Next Generation	Orrin Price	Television film	
1992	Body Chemistry II: The Voice of a Stranger	Big Chuck	Theatrical film	
1992	The Silencer	Michael Keating	Theatrical film	
1993	Counterstrike	Monroe Park	Episode: "The Raw Truth"	
1995	The Rockford Files: A Blessing in Disguise	Himself	Television film	
1997	Meet Wally Sparks	Himself	Theatrical film	
1999	Palmer's Pick-Up	Dick Cash	Theatrical film; final screen role	
