= Karamo (disambiguation) =

Karamo is a given name and surname. Notable people with the name include:

== Given name ==
- Karamo Brown (born 1980), American television host, reality television personality, author, actor, and activist
  - Karamo (talk show), a tabloid show hosted by Brown
- Karamo Jawara (born 1991), Gambian-Norwegian basketball player

== Surname ==
- Kristina Karamo (born 1985), American far-right politician from Michigan
