= Jerry Springer =

American TV personality and politician (1944–2023)

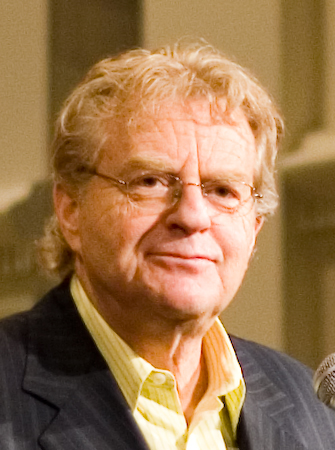
- Springer in 2007
- Born: Gerald Norman Springer; February 13, 1944; London, England
- Died: April 27, 2023 (aged 79); Evanston, Illinois, US
- Resting place: Memorial Park Cemetery, Skokie, Illinois, US
- Citizenship: United Kingdom (by birthplace); United States (naturalized)
- Education: Tulane University (BA); Northwestern University (JD)
- Occupations: Broadcaster; host; politician
- Years active: 1968–2022
- Television: Jerry Springer (1991–2018); Judge Jerry (2019–2022)
- Political party: Democratic
- Spouse: Micki Velton (m. 1973)
- Children: 1

56th Mayor of Cincinnati
- In office January 1, 1977 – January 1, 1978
- Preceded by: Jim Luken
- Succeeded by: Bobbie L. Sterne

Member of the Cincinnati City Council
- In office January 1, 1976 – 1981
- In office January 1, 1972 – April 29, 1974
- Succeeded by: David S. Mann
- Website: jerryspringer.com

Gerald Norman Springer (February 13, 1944 – April 27, 2023) was an American broadcaster, television host, and politician. He was best known for hosting the controversial tabloid talk show The Jerry Springer Show from 1991 to 2018. Noted as a pioneer in the emergence of "trash TV", his eponymous show was a "commercial smash and certifiable cultural phenomenon" in the 1990s.

Born in London during World War II to Jewish refugees escaping the Holocaust, Springer was raised in Queens, New York City. He attended Northwestern University School of Law, qualified as a lawyer, and first became actively involved in politics working for the presidential campaign of Robert F. Kennedy in 1968. A Cincinnati City Council member, Springer served as the 56th Mayor of Cincinnati from 1977 to 1978. He then worked as a local news anchor in Cincinnati, where he won ten Regional Emmy Awards for commentary.

From 2005 to 2006, Springer hosted Springer on the Radio, a liberal talk show on Cincinnati's WCKY-AM. He was the host of the television talent show America's Got Talent from 2007 to 2008, and of the television courtroom show Judge Jerry from 2019 to 2022. He also hosted The Jerry Springer Podcast from 2015 to 2022. After retiring from broadcasting in 2022, Springer died of pancreatic cancer on April 27, 2023, at the age of 79.

== Early life ==
Gerald Norman Springer was born on February 13, 1944, in the London Underground's Highgate station while the station was in use as a shelter from German bombing during World War II. Springer spent his first years living on Chandos Road in the London suburb of East Finchley, Middlesex. His parents, Margot (née Kallmann; a bank clerk) and Richard Springer (owner of a shoe shop), were Jewish refugees who had escaped from Landsberg an der Warthe, Prussia (now Gorzów Wielkopolski, Poland).

His maternal grandmother, Marie Kallmann, was killed in the gas vans of Chełmno extermination camp in German-occupied Poland. His paternal grandmother, Selma Springer (née Elkeles), died at the hospital in the Theresienstadt concentration camp in German-occupied Czechoslovakia. Selma Springer's brother, Hermann Elkeles, was a renowned Berlin doctor who also died at Theresienstadt.

In January 1948, when Springer was almost four years old, his family immigrated to the United States, settling in the Kew Gardens neighborhood of Queens, New York City. He attended nearby Forest Hills High School. One of his earliest memories of current events was watching the 1960 Democratic National Convention on television and being impressed by John F. Kennedy.

Springer earned a Bachelor of Arts degree from Tulane University in 1965, majoring in political science. He earned a Juris Doctor from Northwestern University School of Law in 1968.

== Career ==
=== Kennedy campaign and early law career ===
Springer worked as an adviser to Robert F. Kennedy's presidential campaign in 1968. Following Kennedy's assassination, he began practicing law at the Cincinnati law firm of Frost & Jacobs (later Frost Brown Todd).

Springer was a partner in the law firm of Grinker, Sudman & Springer from 1973 to 1985, alongside former NBA agent Ronnie Grinker and Butler County, Ohio, magistrate Harry Sudman.

=== Political career ===
In 1970, Springer ran to represent Ohio's 2nd congressional district, then based in Cincinnati, in the United States House of Representatives. He failed to unseat incumbent Republican Donald D. Clancy, but took 45% of the vote in a traditionally Republican-leaning district. He had previously spearheaded the effort to lower the voting age, including testifying before the Senate Judiciary Committee in support of the 26th Amendment. Three days after announcing his candidacy, Springer, who was also an Army reservist at the time, was called to active duty and stationed at Fort Knox. He resumed his campaign after he was discharged.

Springer was elected to the Cincinnati City Council in 1971. On April 29, 1974, he resigned from the council after admitting to soliciting a prostitute; however, he ran for the office again in 1975 and won by a landslide. He was reelected in 1977 and 1979. Springer was considered a "gonzo" politician, performing stunts such as staying a night in jail and commandeering a bus after the city took over bus service. In 1977, Springer was chosen by the City Council to serve for one year as mayor, which was not a separately-elected position at the time.

In 1981, Springer stepped down from his seat on the City Council to focus on seeking the Democratic nomination in the 1982 Ohio gubernatorial election. Television commercials for Springer's campaign referenced his use of a check to pay a prostitute, saying that he was not afraid of the truth "even if it hurts." He failed to win the Democratic party's nomination, finishing a distant third behind former lieutenant governor Dick Celeste (who went on to win the general election) and Ohio Attorney General William J. Brown, and his political career was put on hold. In the late 1980s, he played a major role in saving the historic Cincinnati Union Terminal.

Springer considered running to represent Ohio in the United States Senate in 2000 and 2004, but backed down due to negative associations with his broadcasting career. He also considered running in the 2018 Ohio gubernatorial election but decided against it due to his age. Even after his departure from electoral politics, he was the largest contributor to the Hamilton County Democratic Party from 1993 to 2018. In 2016, Springer voiced support for Hillary Clinton in the 2016 United States presidential election.

=== Broadcast career ===
Springer was hired as a political reporter and commentator on Cincinnati's NBC affiliate, WLWT, which at the time had the lowest-rated news program. Later, having been named primary news anchor and managing editor, he sought a broadcast catchphrase in the model of other well-known newsmen. With the help of some others at WLWT, he created his signature line: "Take care of yourself, and each other." Within two years he was Cincinnati's number-one news anchor, along with partner Norma Rashid. He garnered ten local Emmy Awards for his nightly commentaries, which were frequently satirized by local radio personality Gary Burbank. Those commentaries would eventually become his "Final Thought" on The Jerry Springer Show. Springer would remain commentator at WLWT until January 1993. He resided in Loveland, Ohio, during this time.

In 1997, the Chicago-based NBC-owned station WMAQ-TV hired Springer to serve as a news commentator. However, this proved to be unpopular among viewers, as it resulted in the resignation of long-time news anchors Ron Magers and Carol Marin due to Springer's talk show. After performing only two commentaries, Springer resigned as commentator.

==== Jerry Springer (1991–2018) ====
Jerry Springer debuted on September 30, 1991. It began as a straight-laced politically-oriented talk show, a longer version of Springer's news commentaries. Guests on the show included Oliver North and Jesse Jackson, and topics included homelessness and gun politics.

In early 1994, Springer and his new producer, Richard Dominick, revamped the show's format to boost ratings. The show became more successful as it turned towards sensationalism. Most guests were now everyday people confronted on a television stage by a spouse or family member's adultery, sexuality, gender identity, prostitution, hate group membership, or other controversial activities or situations. These confrontations were often promoted by scripted shouting or violence on stage. The retooled show received high ratings and much press attention. By 1998, it was more popular than The Oprah Winfrey Show in many cities, and was reaching around 8 million viewers.

On July 10, 2002, the sons of guest Nancy Campbell-Panitz, who was murdered by her ex-husband after they appeared on a May 2000 episode with his girlfriend, filed suit in Sarasota County, Florida, against Springer, his producers, and his distributor, claiming he created "a mood that led to murder". Ultimately, the estate of Campbell-Panitz dropped all monetary claims and the show agreed to waive its claims for malicious prosecution against the personal representative of the estate and his counsel.

The 2001 satirical musical Jerry Springer: The Opera was inspired by Springer and his talk show. For the New York City performances of the work at Carnegie Hall, Springer was portrayed by Harvey Keitel. The show won four Laurence Olivier Awards for its run on London's West End.

In 2005, a British version of the show aired on Britain's ITV network, titled The Springer Show. A subdued and more tongue-in-cheek version of the American show, it beat its rival Trisha Goddard five to one in the ratings.

The VH1 "celebreality" series The Springer Hustle, which examined the production of Jerry Springer, premiered in April 2007.

In April 2015, Springer debuted The Jerry Springer Podcast on his website, JerrySpringer.com. He later partnered with Westwood One to stream the podcast. It was also broadcast in the UK on Talkradio, on Sundays at midnight. Springer was the second American talk show host to travel to Cuba (after Conan O'Brien) for The Jerry Springer Podcast. The podcast ended in 2022.

On July 26, 2018, Jerry Springer aired its final episode in syndication after 27 seasons, before it began airing reruns on The CW on September 10.

==== Judge Jerry (2019–2022) ====
Springer debuted a new courtroom show, Judge Jerry, on September 9, 2019. The show gave him the opportunity to host a more "grown-up" program and to use his law school education. On March 9, 2022, the series was canceled after three seasons with its final episode airing on August 22, 2022.

==== Other ====
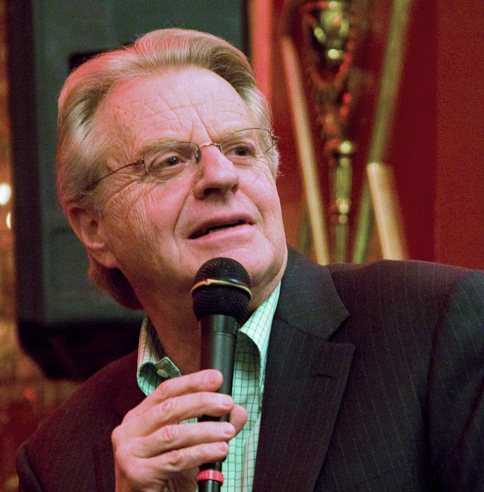
Springer in January 2011

Springer hosted America's Got Talent on NBC for its second and third seasons, replacing Regis Philbin, before leaving to concentrate on other projects and was replaced by Nick Cannon.

From January 17, 2005, to December 5, 2006, Springer hosted Springer on the Radio, a liberal talk show on Cincinnati's WCKY-AM. He did the show from the Clear Channel studios in Kenwood, Ohio on Mondays, Thursdays, and Fridays, and in Chicago (where his television show taped at the time) on Tuesdays and Wednesdays. Air America Radio syndicated the program for most of the show's run. In 2007, Springer also cameoed in a handful of episodes of the George Lopez Show.

He hosted Miss World in 2000 and 2001 and the Miss Universe 2008. He was also the guest host for WWE Raw on February 15, 2010, at Wells Fargo Arena in Des Moines, Iowa. Springer also hosted The Price Is Right Live!.

From 2010 to 2015, Springer hosted a dating game show called Baggage, which aired on GSN.

In July 2012, he hosted ''Price is Right Live!'' in Vancouver's Boulevard Casino. He hosted the show at Jack Cincinnati Casino in 2018.

From January 2014, Springer hosted the Investigation Discovery series Tabloid.

He hosted The Adam Carolla Show on April 25, 2014, where he sat in for Adam Carolla.

Springer guest hosted the 22nd-season premiere episode of WWE Raw on September 8, 2014, in an attempt to conduct an intervention with The Bella Twins.

Springer hosted the show Jerry Springer Presents WWE Too Hot For TV on the WWE Network in 2015.

==== Work in the UK ====
After a few years of his US talk show being aired in the UK, ITV approached Springer, who temporarily co-hosted This Morning with Judy Finnigan in March 1999 and again in 2000. In summer 1999, ITV made 12 episodes of the UK-based version of the series, Jerry Springer UK, filmed at the same studios as his US show.

In September 1999, Springer made a pilot for a David Letterman-style talk show for ITV called Jerry Springer on Sunday. The show received good reviews and ratings; a further four episodes were commissioned to be broadcast in May 2000. Five were broadcast during May and June 2000 under the name Springer.

The series was picked up by Channel 5 and renamed Late Night with Jerry Springer. Two series were made in 2000 and 2001 with 16 episodes. While working for Channel 5 In 2001, he was the host of the UK version of Greed, and a stand in host for The Wright Stuff. On April 16, 2006, Springer was the guest host for the third-season premiere of The Friday Night Project for Channel 4 and guest hosted Have I Got News for You on December 12, 2008. In 2007, he signed on to host Nothing But the Truth, the UK version of the Colombian game show Nada más que la verdad.

Springer covered the 2016 United States presidential election for ITV's Good Morning Britain.

In 2016, 2017 and 2018, he guest hosted three episodes of the BBC One's early-evening talk show The One Show with Welsh TV host Alex Jones.

=== In the media ===
==== Acting ====
Springer appeared in an episode of Married... with Children as the host of a talk show called The Masculine Feminist, in which he advocated for women getting the men's bowling night and eventually taking over at a bowling alley. Al Bundy and his friends tie Springer to a chair and take over his show with a stripper who jumps up and down for the crowd's delight.

Springer starred in the 1998 film Ringmaster as a talk show host largely based on himself, though named "Jerry Farrelly". Ringmaster offers a behind-the-scenes look at would-be guests who apply to a Springer-like show. The same year, Springer also released an unrelated autobiography named Ringmaster. He quipped, "I can only think of one title a year."

Four years later, Springer appeared in Brad Paisley's music video for "I'm Gonna Miss Her (The Fishin' Song)" where the host is trying to stop a fight between men who like to fish and the wives who do not. Springer's section was titled "My Husband Left Me for a Fish." The song hit number one on the country charts in July 2002; it won CMA Video of the Year three months later.

In 2004, he played the US president in The Defender, directed by Dolph Lundgren.

In June 2012, he appeared in the musical Chicago at the Cambridge Theatre London as Billy Flynn for a short period of time, starring alongside Aoife Mulholland and Leigh Zimmerman.

He had a cameo appearance as himself in episode 2 of the Netflix show Happy!.

In 1996, he appeared on an episode of the ninth season of Roseanne and on The X-Files episode "The Post-Modern Prometheus".

In 1997, Springer appeared on an episode of the first season of The Steve Harvey Show, playing himself waiting at the airport alongside Harvey's character and his students.

In 1998, he voiced a cartoon version of himself in the "Starship Poopers" segment of The Simpsons episode "Treehouse of Horror IX". That same year, he appeared as himself on an episode of The Wayans Bros.

In 1999, he appeared in the episode "Mrs. Kraft" of the third season of Sabrina the Teenage Witch. That same year, he appeared on an episode of the animated parody talk show Space Ghost Coast to Coast. He made a cameo appearance in Austin Powers: The Spy Who Shagged Me (1999) as himself, in a fictional episode of his show featuring Dr. Evil and his estranged son Scott.

==== Television appearances ====
In 2009, Springer appeared as a guest on the British game show Countdown. He appeared on the Chris Moyles Show in April 2009 and was a guest on The Andrew Marr Show on May 31, 2009.

He was interviewed by satirist Chris Morris in his surreal radio series Blue Jam (Series 2, Episode 6). On January 23, 2004, Springer was featured in an episode of This American Life titled "Leaving the Fold".

In late 2006, Springer was a contestant on the third season of Dancing with the Stars, with his professional dance partner, Kym Johnson. He wanted to appear on the show so he could learn the waltz for the wedding of his daughter, Katie. Springer and Johnson were eliminated in the seventh week of competition.

Springer appeared in an episode of the British genealogy series Who Do You Think You Are? on August 27, 2008.

Springer was a guest panelist on episodes of the British comedy panel shows 8 Out of 10 Cats in 2014, Through the Keyhole in 2015, and QI ("Noodles") in 2017.

In 2022, Springer competed in season eight of The Masked Singer as "Beetle". He was eliminated on "Muppet Night" alongside Kat Graham as "Robo-Girl".

=== Other projects ===
In 1995, Springer recorded the album Dr. Talk for Fiddle Fish Records, which mostly consisted of country music covers.

On May 16, 2008, Springer delivered a commencement address at Northwestern University School of Law, his alma mater. Although many students had criticized the university's choice of speaker, he received a standing ovation from about half of the audience and reviews of his speech were generally positive. He later stated that his speech was about "the ethical judgments we all have to make in whatever business we go".

In 2025, Netflix released the documentary series Jerry Springer: Fights, Camera, Action.

== Personal life ==
Springer married Micki Velton in 1973; though it is sometimes reported they divorced in 1994, a spokesperson said they were still married at the time of his death. The couple had a daughter, Katie, in 1976. Katie was born without nasal passages, for which she required immediate surgery after birth; she is also blind, and deaf in one ear. In a 2006 interview, Katie stated that her parents were always supportive despite her health complications. In 2006, Springer donated $230,000 to Park School in Evanston, where his daughter worked as an assistant teacher, to help construct a high-tech facility called "Katie's Corner" for students with disabilities.

== Death and legacy ==
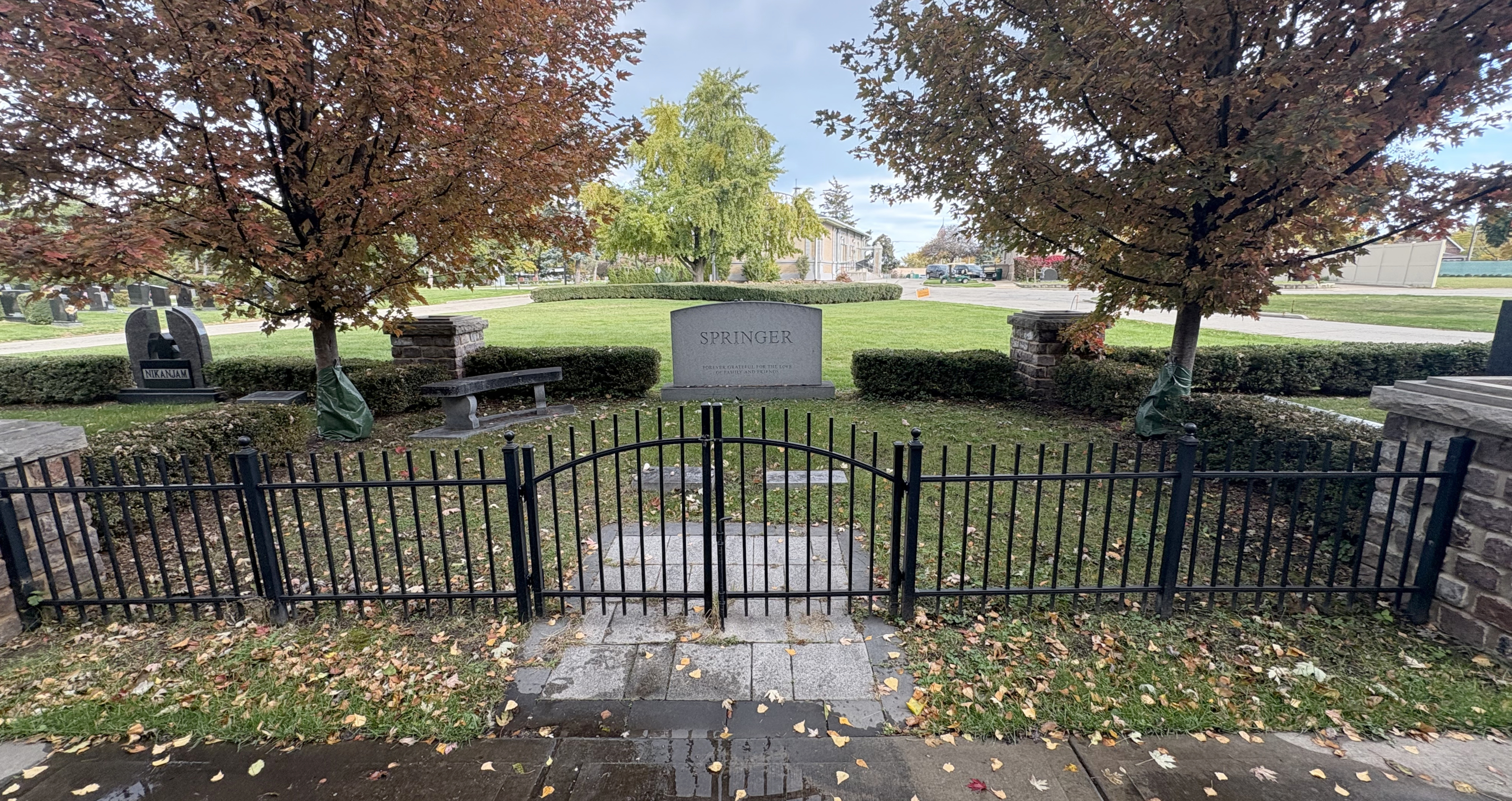
Springer's grave at Memorial Park Cemetery

Springer died at his home in Evanston, Illinois, on April 27, 2023, at the age of 79. A family spokesperson said that he had been diagnosed with pancreatic cancer a few months prior to his death. Steve Wilkos, a former Jerry Springer show bodyguard, paid tribute to his colleague, saying: "Other than my father, Jerry was the most influential man in my life. Everything I have today I owe to Jerry. He was the smartest, most generous, kindest person I've ever known. My wife and I are devastated. We will miss him terribly." He is buried at Memorial Park Cemetery in Skokie, Illinois.

During and after his career, Springer and his program quickly became a cultural phenomenon, with commentators describing the show as central to the emergence of "trash TV". After his death, The Guardian said that Springer "changed US television for better and worse". Despite his controversial career, he had a large fanbase from millennials, as his show gained popularity throughout their childhoods, leading the Los Angeles Times to dub him the "millennials' babysitter".

Springer was credited for creating a new television format, the tabloid talk show, which emphasized controversial topics and encouraged conflict among its guests. USA Today cited him as an inspiration for other tabloid talk shows such as Maury and The Steve Wilkos Show. The Associated Press called his show "a US cultural pariah, synonymous with lurid drama".

In an obituary for Springer, The Irish Times said that Springer had changed the "television medium" through "The Jerry Springer Formula", which was "straightforward, despicable and ingenious". The BBC noted that Springer had presented the "fringes of US society to a global audience" and called him an "era-defining TV host".

== Bibliography ==
- Springer, Jerry and Laura Morton. Ringmaster. St. Martin's Press, 1998.
- Springer, Jerry and Richard Dominick. Jerry Springer's Wildest Shows Ever. Harper Paperbacks, 1999.

Political offices
Preceded by Jim Luken	Mayor of Cincinnati, Ohio; 1977–1978	Succeeded by Bobbie L. Sterne
