= Stamford Center for the Arts =

Theatre in Stamford, Connecticut, U.S.

The Palace Theatre
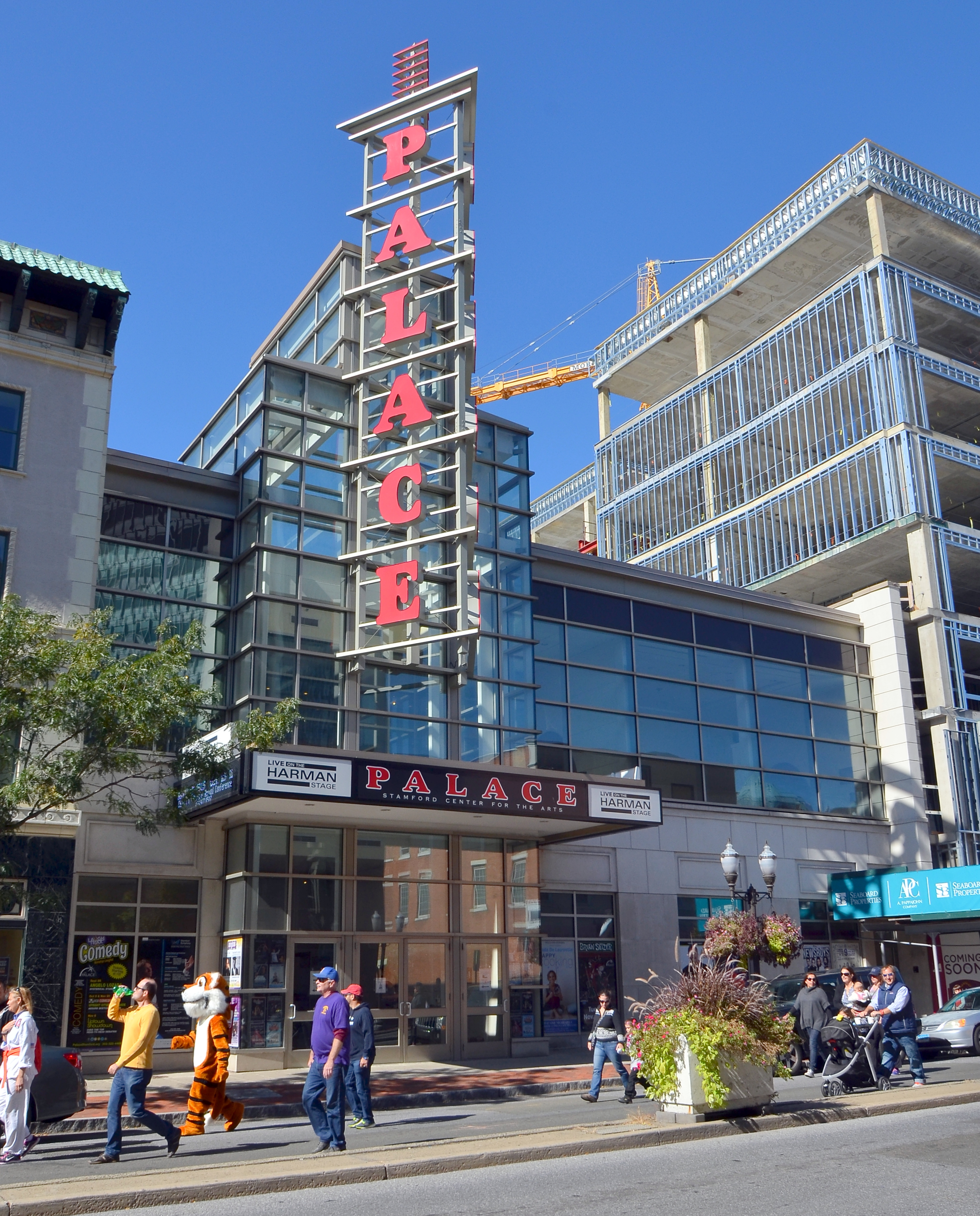
- Interactive map of The Palace Theatre
- Address: 61 Atlantic Street (Palace); 307 Atlantic Street (Rich); Stamford, Connecticut; United States
- Coordinates: 41.0511686°N 73.5400128°W
- Capacity: Palace: 1,580; Truglia: 757
- Current use: concert hall (Palace) television studio (Rich)

Construction
- Opened: 1927 (Palace); 1992 (Rich)
- Architect: Thomas W. Lamb (Palace)

Tenant
- NBCUniversal (Rich)

Website
- palacestamford.org

The Palace Theatre in downtown Stamford, Connecticut, United States, comprises two facilities on Atlantic Street: the restored Palace Theatre, and the Rich Forum, both within four blocks of each other:

== Performance and other facilities ==
- Palace Theatre at 61 Atlantic, with 1,580 seats, was originally a Thomas W. Lamb designed vaudeville house, which opened in 1927. It was restored and re-opened in 1983 for live theatre, concerts and art exhibitions. A recently completed multi-phase improvement project has provided the Palace Theatre with an enlarged stage, new dressing rooms, new technical-support facilities, and improved services.
- Rich Forum opened in 1992 at 307 Atlantic. It includes:

Truglia Theatre, a conventional proscenium theatre with 757 seats.

Leonhardt Studio, a black box theatre, for more intimate performance events.

Mercede Promenade, the main lobby and reception area.

Rossi Salon on the upper level has a panoramic view of downtown Stamford.

Richard and Hinda Rosenthal Gallery overlooks the Mercede Promenade.

The Rich Forum is alternately branded as the Stamford Media Center, with operational control held by NBCUniversal, which uses state tax credits to tape The Steve Wilkos Show and Karamo, along with Maury, Jerry Springer, Judge Jerry, Crazy Talk and the American Trisha Goddard Show in the past.

Both the Rich Forum and Palace Theatre seasons include performances by Connecticut Grand Opera and Orchestra, Stamford Symphony Orchestra, New England Lyric Operetta, Ballet School of Stamford, Young Artist Philharmonic, Lumina String Quartet, Zig Zag Ballet, and The Perry Players.

The theaters have presented such performers as Lily Tomlin, Peter, Paul & Mary, Tom Jones, B.B. King, Carrot Top, Harry Belafonte, Ray Charles, Liza Minnelli, Kathy Griffin, Itzhak Perlman, Emanuel Ax, Yo-Yo Ma, Isaac Stern, Willie Nelson, Tony Bennett and Judy Collins.

== Television studios ==
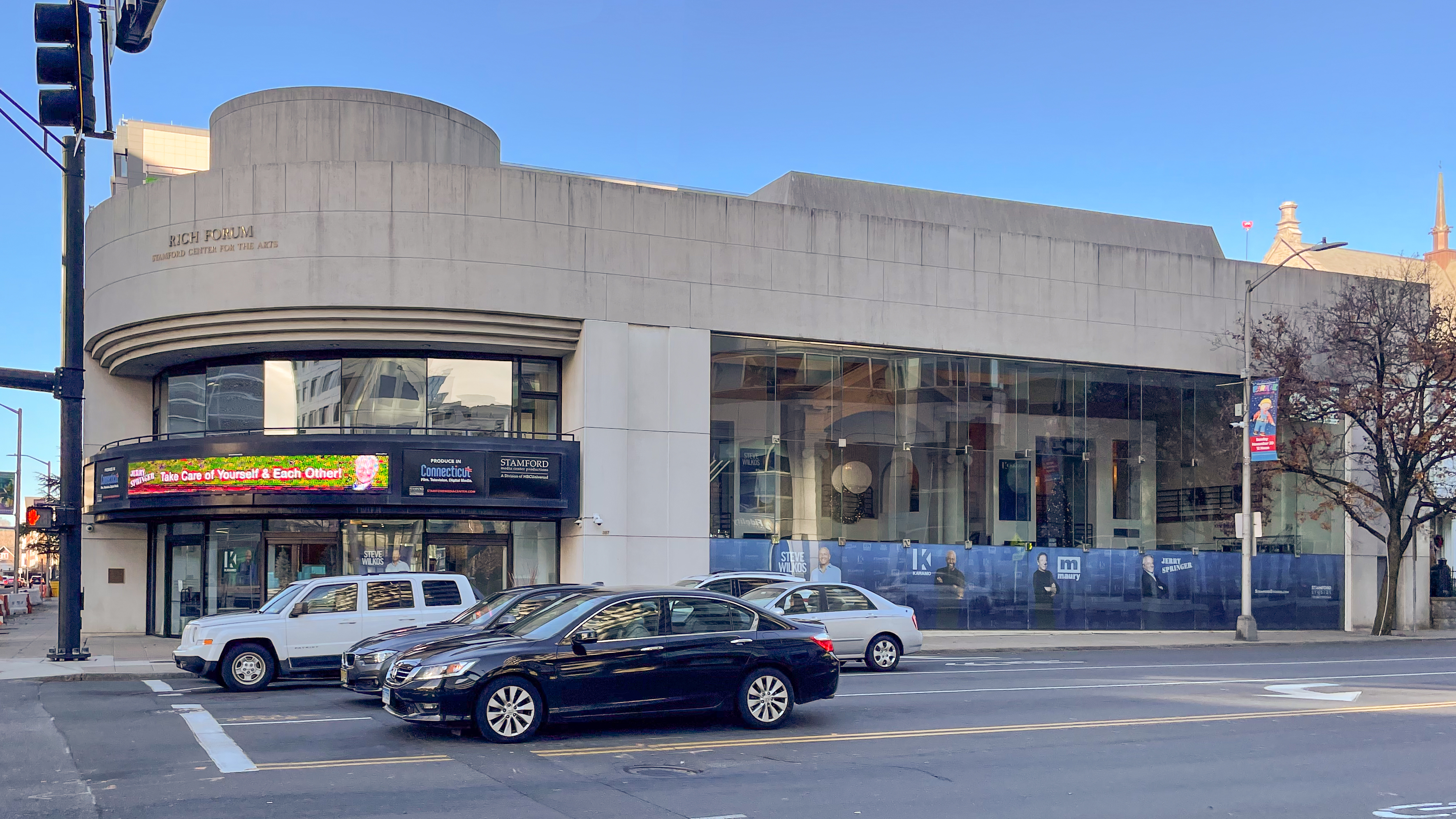
The Rich Forum (2022)

In March 2009, it was announced that Jerry Springer, Maury and The Steve Wilkos Show would be broadcast from the Rich Forum complex. The state of Connecticut promised a 30% production-tax credit on annual activity, and a 20% tax credit on infrastructure costs exceeding $1 million. The state also promised to make $3 million in local infrastructure improvements. The Trisha Goddard Show filmed here from 2012 to 2014. Crazy Talk began production in 2015 and ended in 2016. The Jerry Springer Show ended production in 2018. Jerry Springer's court show, Judge Jerry began production in 2019. Judge Jerry and Maury both ended production in 2022. Karamo began production later that year.

NBCUniversal plans to vacate the facility at the end of 2026 after announcing the cancellation of The Steve Wilkos Show and Karamo in March as part of their decision to end production of their first-run syndicated programs altogether.

== See also ==
- Arts and culture in Stamford, Connecticut
- List of concert halls
