= Judge Jerry =

American reality court show (2019–2022)

- Genre: Arbitration-based reality court show
- Created by: Jerry Springer
- Starring: Jerry Springer; Najee Hinds
- Narrated by: Jim Cutler
- Country of origin: United States
- Original language: English
- No. of seasons: 3
- No. of episodes: 366

Production
- Executive producer: Kerry Shannon
- Camera setup: Multi-camera
- Running time: 17–19 minutes
- Production company: NBCUniversal Syndication Studios

Original release
- Network: Syndication
- Release: September 9, 2019 – August 22, 2022

Related
- Jerry Springer

Judge Jerry is an American arbitration-based reality court show which was presided over by Jerry Springer, who previously hosted Jerry Springer from 1991 to 2018. The series began its run in first-run syndication on September 9, 2019, and was distributed by NBCUniversal Syndication Studios.

In February 2020, the series was renewed for a second season. In March 2021, the series was renewed for a third season. In March 2022, the series was canceled after three seasons with its final episode airing on August 22, 2022. This was Springer's final television show prior to his death in April 2023.

== Production ==
=== Development ===
Host Jerry Springer had planned on retiring after his tabloid talk show ended production in 2018. NBCUniversal, which had syndicated that show, was interested in retaining Springer's services and convinced him to take on hosting duties for an arbitration court show, the distributor's first entry into the genre. Springer was intrigued by the opportunity to host a more "grown-up" program and to use his law school education after decades in other careers.

The signature "Jerry! Jerry!" chant was carried over to Judge Jerry, albeit only during the warm-up and never during the actual proceedings. Cases for Judge Jerry were chosen from pending small claims court cases that had already been filed in jurisdictions across the United States; according to Springer, this was to prevent litigants from purposely seeking out the show to earn 15 minutes of fame, a problem that had occasionally come up during the run of Jerry Springer. In his judicial style, Springer largely played it straight, though he noted: "invariably I crack jokes because I can't help it... even if I have to be stern I'm never going to be mean."

On February 5, 2020, the series was renewed for a second season. On March 23, 2021, the series was renewed for a third season, with the intent of presiding over more outrageous and entertaining cases compared to the previous two years. On March 9, 2022, it was confirmed that the third season would be its last.

=== Filming ===
The show was filmed in front of a live audience at NBCUniversal's Stamford Media Center in Stamford, Connecticut. The show was taped in sessions of 30 to 35 cases every other week.

Episodes produced during the second season were affected by the COVID-19 pandemic. Springer and the show's bailiff, Najee Hinds, were filmed from their respective homes, and litigants appeared from a studio in Scottsdale, Arizona, without an audience. All participants were in front of green screens, which were used to virtually recreate the show's courtroom set.
