= Karamo Brown =

American television host, personality and actor

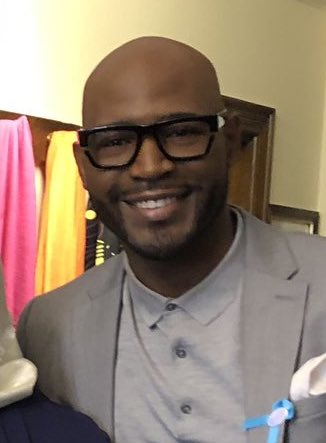
- Brown in 2019
- Born: Karamo Karega Brown; November 2, 1980 (age 45); Houston, Texas, U.S.
- Education: Florida A&M University (BA)
- Occupations: TV personality, talk show host, author
- Partner(s): Ian Jordan (2010–2020); Carlos Medel (2021–2024)
- Children: 2
- Website: karamoshow.com

Karamo Karega Brown (born November 2, 1980) is an American television host, reality television personality, author, actor, and activist. Brown began his career in 2004 on the MTV reality show The Real World: Philadelphia. He currently stars as the culture expert in the Netflix series Queer Eye.

In September 2022, Brown began hosting an eponymous talk show titled Karamo for NBCUniversal.

== Personal life ==
Brown was born in Houston to parents from Jamaica and has three older sisters. He came out as gay at age 14. Brown grew up in Coral Springs, Florida and graduated from Marjory Stoneman Douglas High School in Parkland in 1999. He graduated from Florida A&M University, a historically black university, and has worked in social services.

In 2007, Brown was notified that he was the father of a ten-year-old boy, Jason, and he received custody of him that year. Brown adopted his son's half-brother in 2010; he moved to Los Angeles with his two sons in 2011, where they currently reside. In May 2018, Brown became engaged to director Ian Jordan. They split amicably around June 2020. On May 15, 2021, Karamo began dating photographer Carlos Medel. He and Carlos split in early 2025.

== Career ==
Karamo was most known for his television debut on the MTV reality series The Real World: Philadelphia in 2004. He later competed in the Real World/Road Rules Challenge: The Inferno II, where he was eliminated in episode six.

Brown made a return to reality television on TV One's The Next 15 in 2016, which followed him and five other reality stars. Brown was a contributing host on HLN's Dr. Drew On Call, YouTube's The Young Turks, served as host and producer of HuffPost Live for Huffington Post and as a recurring guest host of Access Hollywood Live. In 2014, Brown became a host and segment producer for the Own Show.

Brown hosted MTV's Are You the One? Second Chances. Brown is the culture expert in the Netflix revival of Queer Eye. The first season was released on Netflix in February 2018.

Brown published a memoir in March 2019 titled Karamo: My Story of Embracing Purpose, Healing, and Hope. In June 2019, Brown had a cameo role in Taylor Swift's "You Need to Calm Down" music video, along with a long list of other celebrities.

In 2019 Brown competed on the 28th season of celebrity dance competition Dancing with the Stars. He was paired with professional dancer Jenna Johnson. Brown and Johnson were the fourth couple eliminated. Brown publicly defended his fellow contestant, former Trump White House press secretary Sean Spicer, who was seen as a divisive and controversial choice for the show. Brown called Spicer "a good guy" and "a friend," and said that he "was proud of him," but also said he did not appreciate Spicer serving as a mouthpiece for many lies in service of Trump. Brown was criticized by many, including author Roxane Gay for normalizing Spicer and his work in the White House. Brown's trailer at DWTS shared a wall with Spicer's; Brown intentionally had transgender friends over, and invited Spicer to socialize. Brown spoke to Spicer about how the actions and policies against LGBTQ rights affect marginalized people. Brown explained he felt he could connect with Spicer as "he has the capacity to find out where others are coming from and to help them become more open-minded and educated."

Starting in 2018, Brown shared some of his best advice about promoting self-esteem to students at multiple universities.

In November 2019, Brown published a children's book, I Am Perfectly Designed, written with his son Jason "Rachel" Brown, illustrated by Anoosha Syed, and published by Henry Holt and Company. Jason said that the title of the book is a phrase Brown often said to Jason growing up.

In 2020, Karamo Brown teamed up with Honest Company alumni to create MANTL, a premium personal care brand for bald and or balding men.

In 2020, Brown was named to the Ebony Power 100 List.

He judged an episode of Is It Cake?, which premiered on Netflix in March 2022.

Brown guest-hosted several episodes of Maury in the 2021–22 season. In March 2022, Brown was announced as host Maury Povich's successor; Povich retired and Brown hosted a new talk show for NBCUniversal Television Distribution, with Karamo starting recording in August and premiering September 19.

In September 2022, Brown featured TikToker creators Chef Pii and Allured Beauty on the Karamo Show in response to Allured Beauty's discovery that Pii's Pink Sauce product was not safe for human consumption after getting it tested by a lab. Her discovery came after multiple similar accounts from other consumers. Brown received backlash for defending Chef Pii and criticizing Allured Beauty, with viewers pointing out that he was 'gaslighting' Allured Beauty during the episode. In February 2023, Brown released a follow-up segment in which he apologized to Alle for how the original "Pink Sauce" episode had been handled.

In March 2026, it was announced by NBCUniversal, was canceling Karamo. It was stated to be due to local station programming preferences. Other shows announced in the cancellations included Steve Wilkos, Access Hollywood, and Access Live.

== Activism ==
In 2014, Brown partnered with the pharmaceutical company Janssen as part of the Positively Fearless campaign to empower the gay and bisexual community.

In 2015, Brown co-founded 6in10.org, an organization that works to combat HIV stigma and provides mental health support and HIV education to the black LGBT community. Karamo volunteers as a youth counselor at the Los Angeles LGBT Center. Brown has also partnered with the Centers for Disease Control and Prevention and the National Black Justice Coalition as their health and wellness ambassador. It was primarily focused on the Black LGBTQ community due to the fact that Brown felt as if that community specifically got overlooked most of the time. Their mission was to eradicate the 6-in-10 HIV statistic plaguing gay and bisexual Black men by providing tailored mental health support.

He was invited by the Obama Administration to work with the White House to create policies and legislations that helped with supporting the aspiring LGBTQ youth and their community along with their allies after school hours. He worked directly with President Barack Obama to support the president Obama Foundation and the My Brother's Keeper Alliance.

In April 2018, he joined Creative Coalition members in traveling to Capitol Hill to petition legislators and the office of Second Lady Karen Pence for increased funding for the National Endowment for the Arts. He is also a national co-chair for Health Care Voter. Brown's activism does not remain local; he travels around the country to speak and host focus groups with HIV organizations, churches, and schools to address the issues the LGBTQ community is facing.

== Filmography ==
=== Television and web ===
Year	Title	Role	Notes
2003	The 5th Wheel	Himself	
2004–2005	The Real World: Philadelphia	26 episodes	
2005	Real World/Road Rules Challenge: The Inferno II	6 episodes	
2007	The DL Chronicles	Agent No. 1	Episode: "Robert"
2012–2013	Bethenny	Himself	Panelist/Correspondent, 4 episodes
2013–2014	Where the Bears Are!	Ronnie Bishop/Reporter	7 episodes
2014–2016	Dr. Drew On Call	Himself	Host/Correspondent/Panelist, 54 episodes
2015	HuffPost Live	Himself	Host, 8 episodes
2015	Steam Room Stories	Karamo	4 episodes
2015	Love & Hip Hop: Hollywood	Himself	Episode: "Out in Hip Hop"
2016	Access Hollywood Live	Himself	Host; 7 episodes
2016	The Next :15	Himself	7 episodes
2016	The Unexplained	Himself	
2017	Are You the One: Second Chances	Himself	Host, 10 episodes
2018	The Real Princess Diaries: From Diana to Meghan	Himself	TV movie documentary
2018–2026	Queer Eye	Himself	Main cast
2018	Nailed It!	Himself	Episode: "Bonus: 3, 2, 1, Ya Not Done!!"
2018	GMA Digital	Himself	"Take it from Karamo Brown: Own who you are"
2018	ELLE	Himself	"Queer Eye's Karamo Brown Insta-Stalks the Fab Five"
2019	Lip Sync Battle	Himself	Season 5, Episode 1
2019	Dancing with the Stars	Himself	Season 28 contestant
2019	The Daily Show With Trevor Noah	Himself	"The Popularity of Queer Eye & Embracing Growth in Karamo"
2019	MTV	Himself	"Karamo Brown Reacts to The Real World: Philadelphia"
2019	Yahoo Lifestyle	Himself	"It was love at first sight for Queer Eye star Karamo Brown"
2019	Good Morning America	Himself	"Karamo Brown motivates and inspires with his new memoir"
2019	Broadly	Himself	"Queer Eye's Karamo Brown Gives Sex Advice: Broadly Hotline"
2019	Big Mouth	Himself	Voice role, Season 3 Episode "Disclousure: The Movie: The Musical!"
2019	The Wendy Williams Show	Himself	"Karamo on Fatherhood"
2020	Miss Americana	Himself	
2020	The Thing About Harry	Paul	Freeform original film
2020	Raven's Home	Miguel Harris	"Slammed"
2020	Selling Sunset	Himself	
2021	Who Wants to Be a Millionaire?	Himself	2 episodes
2021	Miracle Workers	Patriotic Man	Season 3, Episode 6: "Independence Rock"
2022	Is It Cake?	Judge	Netflix
2022–2026	Karamo	Himself	Talk show host
2025	The Real Housewives of Miami	Himself	Season 7, Episode 7: "Textual Tension"

=== Film ===
Year	Title	Role	Notes
2001	The Princess Diaries	School Drummer	Film
2014	Lean	Karamo	Short film
2018	Visible: The LGBTQ Caribbean Diaspora	Himself	

== Awards and nominations ==
=== Emmy Awards ===
Year	Category	Work	Result	Ref.
2020	Outstanding Host for a Reality or Reality Competition Program	Queer Eye	Nominated	
2021	Outstanding Host for a Reality or Reality Competition Program	Queer Eye	Nominated	
2022	Outstanding Host for a Reality or Reality Competition Program	Queer Eye	Nominated	
2023	Outstanding Host for a Reality or Reality Competition Program	Queer Eye	Nominated	
2023	Outstanding Structured Reality Program	Queer Eye	Won	
2024	Outstanding Structured Reality Program	Queer Eye	Nominated	
2025	Outstanding Structured Reality Program	Queer Eye	Won	

=== Miscellaneous awards ===
Year	Award	Category	Work	Result	Ref.
2018	Human Rights Campaign	Visibility Award	Himself	Honored	
2024	GLAAD Media Awards	Outstanding Variety or Talk Show Episode	Karamo	Nominated	
2025	GLAAD Media Awards	Outstanding Variety or Talk Show Episode	Karamo	Nominated	

== See also ==
- List of Afro-Latinos
