= Karamo (talk show) =

American syndicated daytime talk show

- Genre: Talk show
- Created by: Karamo Brown
- Directed by: Randi Clarke Lennon
- Presented by: Karamo Brown
- Theme music composer: Lance W. Conrad; Eric Vasquez
- Country of origin: United States
- Original language: English
- No. of seasons: 4
- No. of episodes: 471

Production
- Executive producers: Kerry Shannon; Gloria Harrison-Hall
- Production locations: Rich Forum, Stamford, Connecticut
- Camera setup: Multi-camera
- Running time: 43 minutes
- Production companies: NBCUniversal Syndication Studios; Endeavor Content; Stamford Studios Production

Original release
- Network: Syndication
- Release: September 19, 2022 – May 26, 2026

Karamo is an American syndicated daytime talk show hosted by Karamo Brown. It ran from September 19, 2022 to May 26 2026 and is distributed by NBCUniversal Syndication Studios.

== Production ==
Karamo is filmed at the Rich Forum in Stamford, Connecticut, which is alternatively known as the Stamford Media Center. The program is generally a successor to Maury, on which Brown was a frequent guest host and whose production team moved over to Karamo. The program had achieved 90 percent national clearance by April 2022 with Los Angeles being the notable market not airing in. Though it films in the same studio as The Jerry Springer Show, Brown has stated that he seeks more resolutions to conflicts than Springer or Maury Povich did, telling Los Angeles magazine that there would be "no baby mama stuff", and compared his take on the daytime talk genre to the 2018 reboot of Queer Eye, on which he features. He also has cited his experience in social services as part of the background he brings to the show. A feature in The Washington Post noted that the new daytime talk shows for the 2022–23 season—Karamo, Sherri, and The Jennifer Hudson Show—all represented a return to a pre-tabloid, pre-Springer community focus and tone.

In March 2023, NBCUniversal renewed the program for a second season; the program was cleared in 85 percent of the United States at that time. A third season was announced in March 2024. In May 2025, the show was renewed for a fourth season.

On March 13, 2026, NBCUniversal announced that it would exit the first-run syndication business and cease production of its remaining programs, including Karamo, resulting in the show being cancelled after four seasons. All remaining episodes of the show have been produced; the series ended on May 26, 2026.

== Series overview ==
Series overview
Season	Episodes	Originally released		Ref.
Season	Episodes	First released	Last released	Ref.
1	133	September 19, 2022	May 24, 2023	
2	125	September 18, 2023	May 3, 2024	
3	125	September 16, 2024	May 22, 2025	TBA
4	94	September 22, 2025	May 26, 2026	

== Broadcasting and release ==
The show served as a replacement for Maury. With its premiere, the show received coverage in 90% of the country.

== Reception ==
=== Television viewership and ratings ===
The program had a reported 600,000 daily viewers by March 2023, an 18-percent increase from the start of the television season, though this was still well behind the 1.7 million viewers tuning in to Maury daily as of 2020, as well as such programs as The Drew Barrymore Show and Sherri. NBCUniversal reported growth of 20 percent in total viewers for the second season.

=== Awards and nominations ===
Awards and nominations
Award	Year (Note: Indicates the year of ceremony)	Category	Nominee(s)	Result	Ref.
GLAAD Media Awards	2024	Outstanding Variety or Talk Show Episode	"I'm Not Just Gay, I'm Your Son"	Nominated	
GLAAD Media Awards	2025	Outstanding Variety or Talk Show Episode	"DNA: This Is Not My Child / Mom, Why Can't You Accept Me?"	Nominated	
