= Steve Wilkos =

American television personality (born 1964)

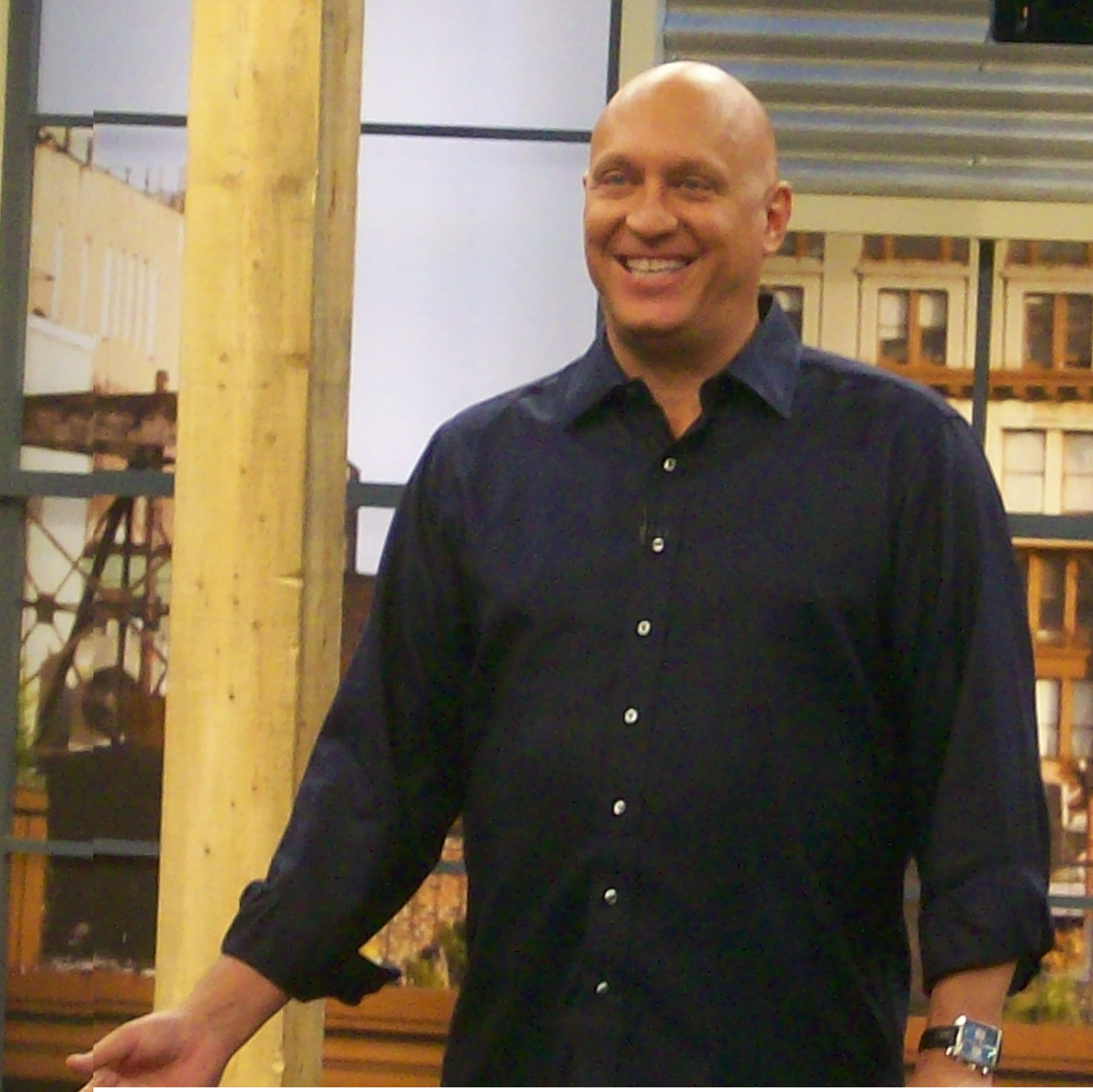
- Wilkos before a show-taping in 2011
- Born: Steven John Wilkos; March 9, 1964 (age 62); Chicago, Illinois, U.S.
- Occupation: Talk show host
- Years active: 1982–1989 (Marine); 1990–2002 (Police officer); 1994–2007 (Director of security - The Jerry Springer Show); 2007–2026 (Television host)
- Known for: Jerry Springer and The Steve Wilkos Show
- Television: NBCUniversal
- Height: 6'3
- Spouse: Rachelle Consiglio (m. 2000)
- Children: 2, 2003 & 2005 (Gen-Z)
- Awards: 4x Annual PRISM Awards
- Military career
- Allegiance: United States of America
- Branch: United States Marine Corps
- Service years: 1982–1989
- Rank: Sergeant (E-5)
- Units: 7th Comm Battalion, Okinawa; MCB Quantico, Virginia; MACG-48, Illinois; MCRD Parris Island
- Conflicts: Cold War: Team Spirit 1983
- Website: www.stevewilkos.com

Steven John Wilkos (/ˈwɪlkoʊs/; born March 9, 1964) is an American television personality and former law enforcement officer with the Chicago Police Department. He hosted The Steve Wilkos Show until October 2026, and was director of security on Jerry Springer from 1994 to 2007. He had previously substituted for Springer as host on several occasions before being given his own talk show.

== Early life and education ==
Wilkos was born in Chicago, Illinois, and grew up in what is now the Roscoe Village neighborhood in North Center, Chicago, and is the third of four children. His parents are Jeanette (née Pelikan), a beauty school instructor, and Stanley Wilkos, a former police officer. He graduated from Lane Technical High School in 1982.

== Career ==
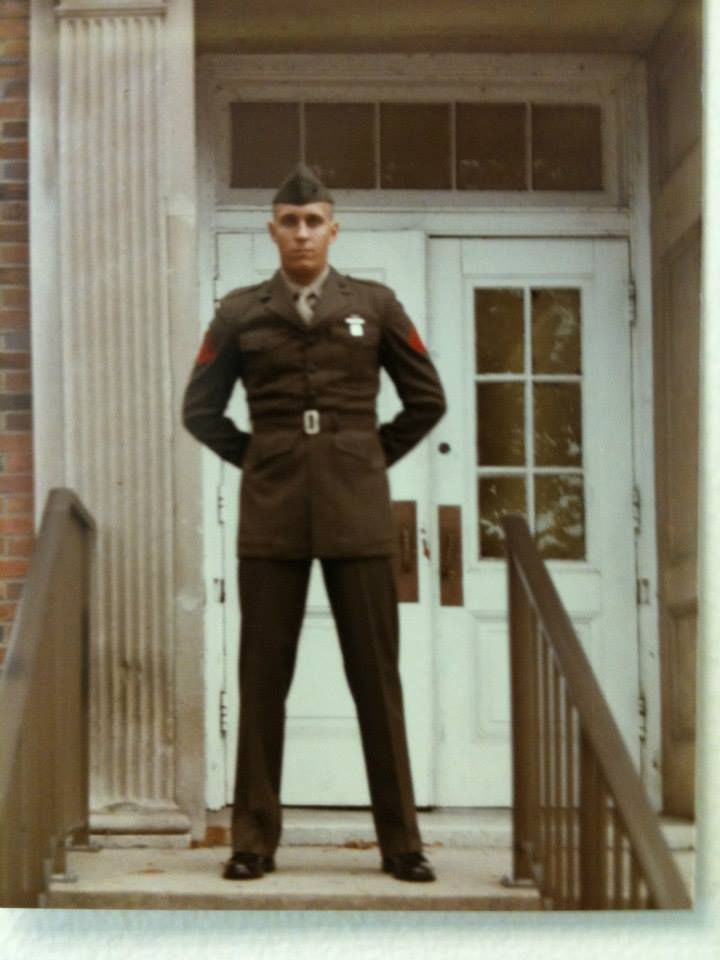
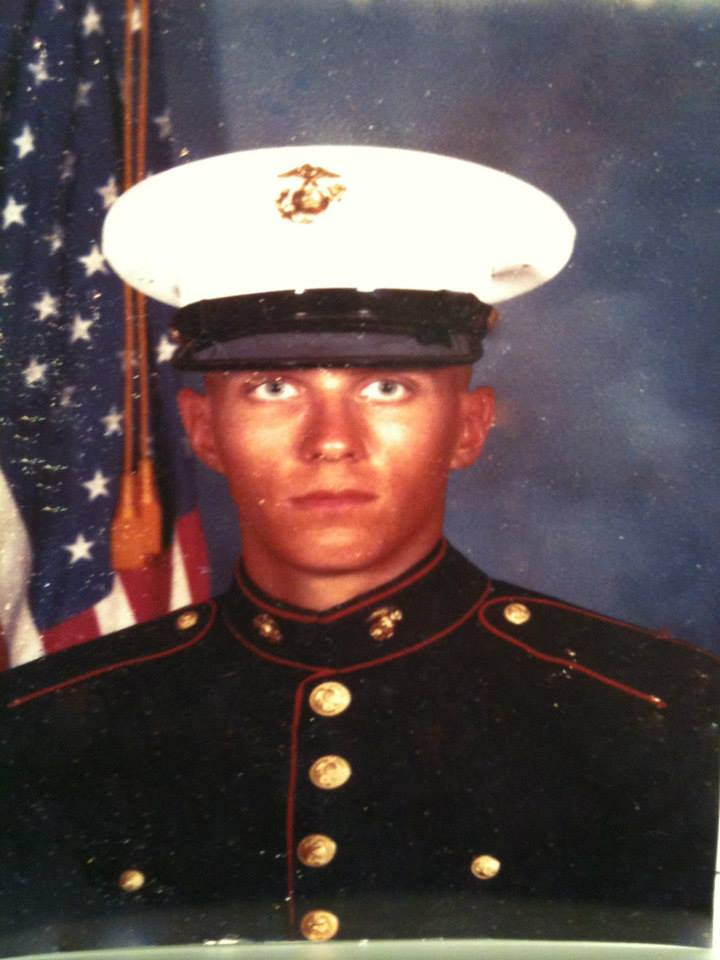
Wilkos in the 1980s as a U.S. Marine.

In October 1982, Wilkos joined the U.S. Marine Corps, serving in South Korea, Japan, Illinois, Virginia, and South Carolina before being discharged in March 1989.

=== Chicago Police Department ===
Wilkos joined the Chicago Police Department in 1990, where he was stationed at various times in the Logan Square, Humboldt Park, and Near West Side neighborhoods of Chicago.

=== Jerry Springer ===
In May 1994, the producers of Jerry Springer, taped in Chicago at that time, needed security guards, so they decided to hire Wilkos and other off-duty police officers to work part-time for the show. Wilkos recruited several fellow officers for the job;he retired from the force and worked exclusively for the show beginning in September 2001.

Entertainment Weekly reported that Wilkos became a professional wrestler with the MCW Pro Wrestling during a temporary production hiatus of Jerry Springer. In 2005, Wilkos appeared as a guest on Check, Please!, a restaurant-reviewing program on Chicago's PBS station, WTTW. In 2006, after Springer began what would be a seven-episode stint on Dancing with the Stars, Wilkos filled in for him in the meantime and Springer later recruited Wilkos to substitute for him each Monday, calling him "the obvious choice".

Beyond Jerry Springer, he has made cameo appearances on the MLB Network. He's also appeared on TV series Between Brothers, The Wayans Bros. and in the movie Austin Powers: The Spy Who Shagged Me as a security guard for Jerry Springer.

=== The Steve Wilkos Show ===
In January 2007, NBC Universal Television officially announced that Wilkos would host a talk show of his own based at NBC Tower in Chicago. The self-titled program premiered on September 10, 2007, and received high ratings. Wilkos is known for his abrasive approach to solving disputes.

Like other tabloid talk shows, The Steve Wilkos Show aired primarily on affiliates of Fox, MyNetworkTV and The CW. Only scattered ABC, CBS and NBC affiliates in smaller markets aired it to fill their timeslot and it never aired in Los Angeles. The CW Plus has aired The Steve Wilkos Show since 2007, airing weekdays between 8am-11am.

The show ended production in March 2026 as part of NBCUniversal's decision to end all of their first-run syndication programs.

Wilkos has stated he would like to continue his show if given the opportunity.

== Personal life ==
He married Rachelle Consiglio, the executive producer for Jerry Springer as well as his own show, in 2000. They have two children. They lived in Park Ridge, Illinois, until moving to Darien, Connecticut, in 2009 when The Steve Wilkos Show moved production to nearby Stamford. Wilkos also owns a summer house in Camp Lake, Wisconsin.

=== Car wrecks ===
On January 21, 2018, Wilkos was involved in a rollover crash near his home and was charged with drunk driving. He asked a judge for an alternative punishment which would result in charges being dismissed upon completion of an education and treatment program.

As of 2026, Wilkos has stated he no longer drinks alcohol.
