= Jerry Springer: Fights, Camera, Action =

- Genre: Miniseries, documentary
- Starring: Jerry Springer
- Country of origin: United States
- Original language: English
- No. of seasons: 1
- No. of episodes: 2

Production
- Production company: Netflix

Original release
- Network: Netflix
- Release: January 7, 2025

Jerry Springer: Fights, Camera, Action is an American documentary miniseries about the television series The Jerry Springer Show. It was released on Netflix on January 7, 2025.

== Viewership ==
According to data from Showlabs, Jerry Springer: Fights, Camera, Action ranked fifth on Netflix in the United States during the week of 6–12 January 2025.
