= The Trisha Goddard Show =

American syndicated talk show (2012–2014)

- Also known as: Trisha
- Genre: Tabloid talk show
- Based on: Trisha Goddard
- Presented by: Trisha Goddard
- Country of origin: United States
- Original language: English
- No. of seasons: 2
- No. of episodes: 260

Production
- Executive producer: Paul Faulhaber
- Running time: 40 to 44 minutes
- Production companies: Faulhaber Media; NBCUniversal Television Distribution

Original release
- Network: Syndication
- Release: September 15, 2012 – May 25, 2014

The Trisha Goddard Show (also stylized as Trisha) is an American syndicated tabloid talk show hosted by Trisha Goddard. It was a spin-off of Maury and was based on Goddard's British show. The show premiered on September 17, 2012. It also aired in the United Kingdom on Channel 5 between October 2012 and July 2014.

On January 25, 2013, Barry Wallach — president of NBCUniversal Television Distribution — announced that the series had been renewed for a second season.

On April 1, 2014, it was announced that The Trisha Goddard Show had been canceled.

== Ratings ==
Out of the five new talk shows to premiere during the 2012–13 television season, Trisha ranked fifth behind Katie, Steve Harvey, The Jeff Probst Show, and The Ricki Lake Show for the same television season. During the week of November 5, 2012, Trisha averaged 706,000 viewers, which is deemed acceptable due to clearances on affiliates of lower networks, such as The CW and MyNetworkTV.
