= Rachelle Wilkos =

American television producer (born 1971)

- Born: Rachelle Lynn Consiglio; January 11, 1971 (age 55); St. Clair Shores, Michigan, U.S.
- Education: Wayne State University
- Occupations: Executive producer of Jerry Springer and The Steve Wilkos Show
- Years active: 1994–present
- Spouse: Steve Wilkos (m. 2000)
- Children: 2

Rachelle Lynn Wilkos (née Consiglio; born January 11, 1971) is an American television producer.

Wilkos is a former senior producer on Jerry Springer and is now the executive producer of The Steve Wilkos Show (hosted by her husband, former Jerry Springer security guard turned talk show host Steve Wilkos).

When longtime Jerry Springer executive producer Richard Dominick left the show at the start of the 2008 season, Wilkos was named the executive producer of The Steve Wilkos Show.

== Personal life ==
Wilkos graduated from Lake Shore High School in St. Clair Shores, Michigan near Detroit in 1989.

Wilkos attended Wayne State University with a major in journalism. Her television career started with a local morning show called Kelly & Company in 1994 as an intern. She later moved up to associate producer. Shortly after her promotion, she left the program to join Jerry Springer.

She and her husband have two children, a daughter named Ruby (born 2003) and a son named Jack (born 2005). They resided in Park Ridge, Illinois until 2009 before production of Jerry Springer and Wilkos moved to Stamford, Connecticut. Steve has told audience members before tapings that he and his family now reside in Fairfield County, Connecticut.

In April 2020, Wilkos was reportedly being treated for breast cancer, and her father was hospitalized due to COVID-19. By the following November, her breast cancer prognosis improved; her father had passed.
