= Richard Dominick =

American television producer (born 1952)

- Born: May 21, 1952 (age 73); Elizabeth, New Jersey, U.S.
- Occupations: Television producer and journalist
- Known for: Being executive producer for The Jerry Springer Show and The Steve Wilkos Show
- Children: 2

Richard Dominick (born May 21, 1952) is an American television producer and journalist who was the executive producer of NBCUniversal Domestic Television Distribution's Jerry Springer from 1994 to 2008. Dominick also served in the same capacity on The Steve Wilkos Show for its first season, as well as the truTV police series Bait Car. He later produced (and created) another popular truTV series, Hardcore Pawn.

== Early life and career ==
Dominick began his career as the artistic director of the New Jersey Public Theater. While there, he also created, wrote and performed in the Comedy Workshop, a group that innovated late night weekend comedy presentations.

== Journalism career ==
His next career move was into journalism for the Weekly World News and Sun where he reported on stories like "Toaster Possessed by the Devil" and "Howdy Doody Dummy Comes Alive and Saves Drowning Man." With his unique perspective, Dominick made seven appearances on Late Night with David Letterman to discuss his unusual assignments.

== Television career ==
Versed in writing, reporting and directing, Dominick soon made the transition into television with The Wilton North Report, a short-lived late night comedy program for Fox. Later, he served as a producer for a 1990 syndicated revival of the TV series House Party, which was hosted by future Fox and Friends co-host Steve Doocy. Dominick was also the sole writer for ESPN's Sports Emmy Awards, broadcast live in May 1991 and hosted by Saturday Night Live alumni comedian Dennis Miller.

Dominick also contributed comedy material as a freelance writer to Jay Leno. Other jobs have included writing for The Jenny Jones Show and serving as supervising producer of Not Just News, a syndicated children's news program that aired during the 1991–92 season. Dominick has also made his mark as a freelance writer for such publications as National Lampoon, Cracked and Penthouse where, on assignment in 1990, he traveled the entire United States in search of Elvis Presley

Dominick made seven appearances on Late Night with David Letterman where he discussed with Letterman his tabloid stories such as “Toaster Possessed by the Devil” and “I Was Bigfoot’s Love Slave”.

=== Jerry Springer ===
In 1991, Dominick joined Jerry Springer and became the show's executive producer three years later, following the departure of original producer Burt Dubrow. Around this time, Jerry Springer was on the verge of being cancelled, prompting Dominick to take drastic action with regards to the show's format. He turned the world of TV talk shows upside down by taking the show out of the hands of experts and allowing ordinary people to come on stage and offer a slice of their lives — something they never had a chance to do before. He demanded his producers "make the show interesting with the sound off" and encouraged the show's controversial themes and topics, which led to the show's success and turned Jerry Springer himself into a pop culture icon. In 1998, Springer had made it to the top, knocking The Oprah Winfrey Show out of the top spot for 57 straight weeks. This led to Dominick being named one of 1998's "Marketing 100" by Advertising Age magazine. He was quoted in Newsweek as saying, "If you want to save the whales, call Oprah. If you're dating a whale, call us." Dominick was also responsible for the sound effects that are often heard on the show. Dominick was also one of the executive producers for Springer's 1998 film Ringmaster.

=== The Springer Hustle ===
In 2006, Dominick teamed with VH1 to create a behind-the-scenes show, following the events of Jerry Springer. It debuted to good ratings, but was canceled after one season. Dominick dropped the show after finding it was too much on his heavy producing load.

=== The Steve Wilkos Show ===
In September 2007, former Jerry Springer bodyguard Steve Wilkos started his own show, taking on predators and bad parents. Richard Dominick served as the show's Executive Producer for the first season. He left following the production of the second season.

=== Hardcore Pawn ===
Dominick's production company and truTV launched the reality series Hardcore Pawn in 2010. The show was recorded at American Jewelry and Loan.

== Personal life ==
Dominick has two children.
