= The Steve Wilkos Show =

American syndicated talk show

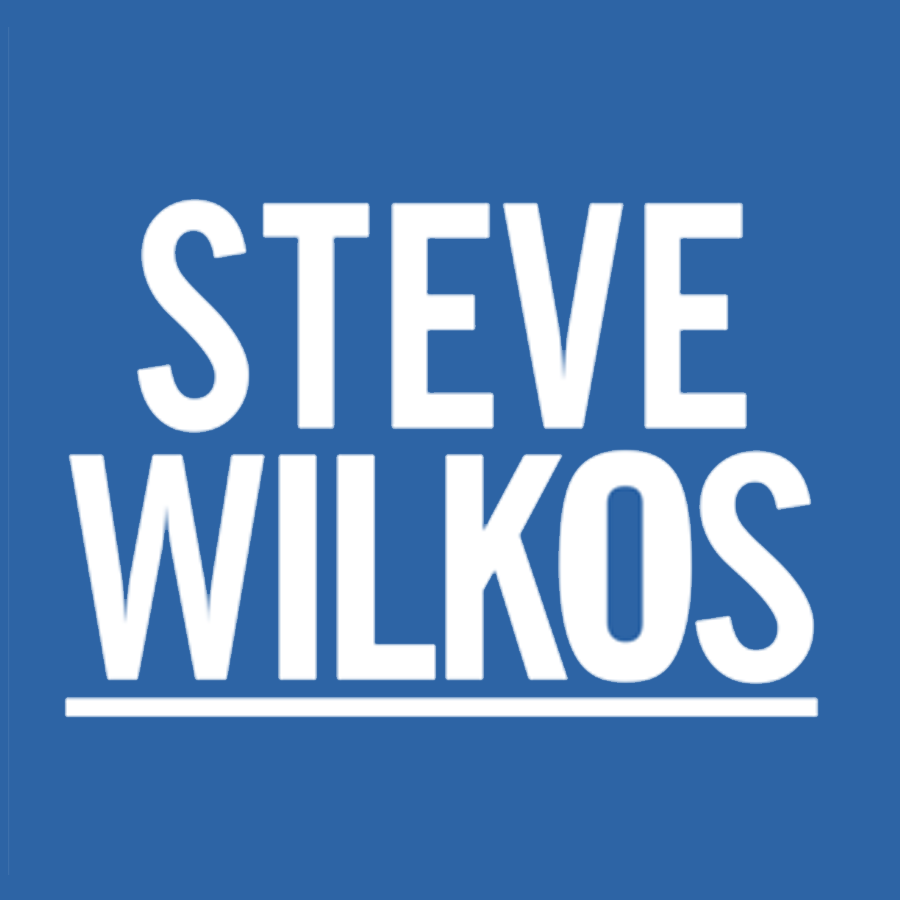
- Also known as: Steve Wilkos
- Genre: Tabloid talk show
- Created by: Steve Wilkos
- Presented by: Steve Wilkos
- Country of origin: United States
- Original language: English
- No. of seasons: 19
- No. of episodes: 2,200+

Production
- Executive producers: Steve Wilkos (2018-2026); Richard Dominick (2007–2008); Jerry Springer (2007–2023); Rachelle Wilkos (2008–2026)
- Production locations: Rich Forum, Stamford, Connecticut
- Camera setup: Multiple
- Running time: 42 minutes
- Production companies: Richard Dominick Productions (season 1); Stamford Media Center Productions (seasons 10–19); NBCUniversal Television Distribution (seasons 1–14); NBCUniversal Syndication Studios (seasons 14–19)

Original release
- Network: Syndication
- Release: September 10, 2007 – October 7, 2026

Related
- Jerry Springer

The Steve Wilkos Show is an American syndicated tabloid talk show hosted by Steve Wilkos. The series was a spin-off of the Jerry Springer show, where Wilkos was employed as head of security. The show aired from September 10, 2007, to October 7, 2026 with a total of over 2,200 episodes spanning nineteen seasons.

== Production ==
The Steve Wilkos Show was a spin-off from the Steve to the Rescue segments on Jerry Springer. Some of the topics he covered included adultery, domestic abuse, child molestation, child abuse, paternity, disrespectful children, teenage pregnancy, drug and alcohol abuse, rape, theft, phobia, murder, kidnapping, and missing person reports.

Polygraph exams were entirely used on the show as a means of resolving issues, despite inconclusive evidence of their effectiveness/accuracy. Daniel Ribacoff, a polygraph expert, was commonly featured on the show to explain polygraph results.

== History ==
Wilkos had appeared twice on Maury; first in 2008, and then on its 2,500th episode in 2013.

On November 22, 2013, The Steve Wilkos Show celebrated its 1,000th episode, along with Jerry Springer and Rachelle Wilkos as special guests. The episode looked back on its first seven seasons.

The Steve Wilkos Show celebrated its tenth anniversary in September 2016. Steve and Rachelle Wilkos, as well as the producers, hosted a series of tributes entitled "A Decade of Steve", looking back on the first nine seasons.

As of May 2025, the broadcast coverage of the series in the United States was 87 percent.

== Format changes ==
In the second season, Wilkos began dividing some episodes into two segments, each one dealing with different guests and issues. In rare cases, there could be three segments in one episode. Additionally, cheating and infidelity were added as topics to the show.

According to the Chicago Sun-Times, executive producer Richard Dominick was forced from the program by Jerry Springer and NBC Universal Domestic Television after encouraging Wilkos to become extremely physical with a guest. Rachelle Wilkos, Wilkos's wife, and a long-time Jerry Springer crew member, became the program's executive producer. Steve Wilkos admitted to being dissatisfied with the show's first season, saying "All I did was yell at everybody and throw people off the stage. There was no level of emotion -- just hardcore yelling." Upon his wife taking over, she encouraged him to be himself and go with his "gut."

== Broadcast history and release ==
Wilkos' third season premiered on September 14, 2009, originating from the Stamford Media Center in Stamford, Connecticut. Production of the show had relocated from Chicago to Stamford earlier that year, complete with a new studio. Fellow NBCUniversal talk shows Maury and Jerry Springer made the move as well.

In May 2022, it was announced that The Steve Wilkos Show had been renewed for a sixteenth season. On March 21, 2023, the show was renewed for a seventeenth season. The show was renewed for an eighteenth season on March 27, 2024. On May 19, 2025, the show was renewed for a nineteenth season.

On March 13, 2026, it was announced that The Steve Wilkos Show had been cancelled after nineteen seasons as part of NBCUniversal's decision to end all first-run syndication shows produced by the network. The show continued to air new episodes until October 7, 2026; reruns will continue to air in syndication afterwards.

== Reception ==
=== Critical reception ===
After attending tapings of the show in August 2007, Chicago Sun-Times TV critic Mike Thomas said of Wilkos: "...his toughness is tempered by tenderness".

Brian Lowry of Variety had a negative review of the first week of shows, calling them "tawdry" and adding: "If Wilkos and company really cared, one suspects they'd bypass the televised morality plays, spare tearful teenagers from watching their father humiliated and go straight to the cops for restraining orders, but that's not nearly as cathartic as getting in people's grills and yelling at them."

=== Television viewership and ratings ===
The show's first season had the highest-rated premiere of fall 2007, with a Nielsen rating of 1.1. From 2007 to 2014, the show had the highest rating growth out of any syndicated talk show, especially among households and women aged 25 to 54. In November 2014, the show had a Nielsen rating of 1.5, with an estimated 1.8 million daily viewers. As of March 2020, the show averaged a 1.0 Nielsen rating, with 1.4 million daily viewers according to NBCU.

== See also ==
- Kenny Easterday
- Jerry Springer: The Opera
- The Jeremy Kyle Show (British talk show)
- The Jeremy Kyle Show (American talk show)
- Face to Face
