= Maury (talk show) =

American tabloid talk show (1991–2022)

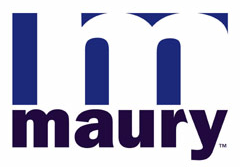
- Also known as: The Maury Povich Show (1991–98)
- Genre: Tabloid talk show
- Created by: Skye McDonald
- Directed by: Andrew Povich
- Presented by: Maury Povich
- Country of origin: United States
- No. of seasons: 31
- No. of episodes: 5,545

Production
- Executive producers: Paul Faulhaber; Maury Povich
- Running time: 42 minutes
- Production companies: MoPo Productions (seasons 1–31); Faulhaber Media (seasons 19–31); Paramount Domestic Television (seasons 1–7); Studios USA Television Distribution (seasons 8–11); Universal Domestic Television (seasons 12–13); Stamford Media Center Productions (seasons 26–31); NBCUniversal Television Distribution (seasons 14–30); NBCUniversal Syndication Studios (seasons 30–31)

Original release
- Network: Syndication
- Release: September 9, 1991 – September 8, 2022

Maury (Note: The show's title was originally The Maury Povich Show.) is an American daytime talk show that was hosted by Maury Povich. The show ran in syndication for thirty-one seasons from September 9, 1991, to September 8, 2022, in which it broadcast 5,545 episodes. The show frequently featured paternity tests that determined if participants were father of a child or not.

It was produced by MoPo Productions Inc. in association with Paramount Domestic Television. The show began unofficially using the title Maury in the 1995–1996 season, although its original title remained official until 1998, when Studios USA (now NBCUniversal) took over production and the show was officially retitled Maury. MoPo Productions Inc continued to co-produce with NBCUniversal throughout the rest of the show's run. For the series' first 18 seasons, it was taped in New York City's Grand Ballroom; from 2009 until its end in 2022, the show was taped at the Rich Forum in Stamford, Connecticut, which is alternatively known as the Stamford Media Center, along with NBC's other syndicated programming.

With a run that went a total 31 seasons, Maury is the longest-running daytime talk show with a single host in American history.

== Production ==
=== Conception and development ===
Povich, whose background prior to launching Maury was in major-market local news and tabloid journalism, treated each episode and story with the seriousness of a journalist, noting that despite the show's theatrics and entertainment elements, each story he covered involved real people and real-life consequences. He was especially proud of cases in which men would own up to their paternity, get involved in their child's life, and reunite with the mother to form a stable nuclear family. Much of Povich's focus on paternity tests came from his steadfast belief in the virtues of the nuclear family and his stance that children were best served with both parents involved in the child's life.

The show was also inspired by Povich's previous work on A Current Affair and the soap opera format which often focused on story arcs related to paternity. Povich felt that the show could do "in 12 minutes" what soap operas often took months or years to accomplish.

=== Topic selection ===
Maury dealt with a variety of issues across its 31 seasons, including—but not limited to—teenage pregnancy, sexual infidelity, paternity test results, polygraph test results, uncommon illnesses, makeovers, "out of control" teenagers, transgender individuals, sperm theft, obese children, domestic violence, little people, bullying, molestation, rape, murder, kidnapping, child abuse, and unusual phobias. After the taping of these episodes, guests were often tracked for progress, both on air and on the Maury website. Over time, the show narrowed its focus to include more stories based on infidelity and paternity testing since they were most popular among the show's audience.

Episodes featuring updates on past guests were periodically aired throughout the year. Guests either appeared in person or by video message updating Maury on their situations. At the end of every season, Maury performed a countdown of the top 10 most memorable guests of the year, with updates on each guest.

The Chicago Tribune's Steve Johnson described a typical episode topic as "Obese tots lumbering about in diapers; teen girls who dress provocatively and/or get sent to boot camp."

== Broadcast history and release ==
For the first 18 seasons, Maury episodes were taped back-to-back at the Grand Ballroom of the Hotel Pennsylvania in New York City. The studio shared the facility in the Hotel Pennsylvania with The People's Court until the show relocated studios in 1998, and The Sally Jessy Raphael Show until its cancellation in 2002.

From 2007, NBC-owned and operated stations stopped airing Maury.

For the 2009–10 season, production was moved from New York City to Stamford, Connecticut, where the series was taped at the Stamford Media Center, along with Jerry Springer and The Steve Wilkos Show. This move was made in part because Connecticut offered NBC a tax credit if production of these three series was moved to the state. A large overhead crane was used to hoist the centerpiece backdrop during conversions for show filming. It took about 3 hours and a crew of about 15 decorators and electricians to convert the studio set from one show to the other. When a guest ran backstage on Maury, it was quite common to see Steve Wilkos or Jerry Springer set props come into view.

On September 14, 2012, during the premiere of its 22nd season, episodes of Maury began airing in widescreen, though not in high definition. On September 15, 2014, starting with its 24th season, episodes of Maury started airing in high definition. In October 2014, Maury was renewed through September 2018. In June 2018, Maury was renewed again through the 2019–2020 television season.

In March 2020, Maury was renewed through the 2021–2022 season. In December 2021, it was reported that the show would end the following spring. In March 2022, Povich, then 83 years old, announced his retirement from broadcasting effective at the end of the 2021–22 season, with a conflict show hosted by Karamo Brown (who had guest-hosted several Maury episodes during its final season) being shopped by NBCUniversal to take over the time slot, while reruns of Maury will be made available to stations. In a June 2022 postmortem, Povich discussed his career with Greg Braxton of the Los Angeles Times, noting that he had accomplished all he had wanted to do during his career, was proud of what he had created with Maury (especially in maintaining the show's ratings in a time when daytime television audiences were shrinking rapidly), and had no further desire for any other television projects. The final episode of Maury aired on September 8, 2022, with reruns continuing to air in syndication ever since.

The show is the longest-running daytime talk show with a single host in broadcast history.

== Content editing ==
The series was edited to meet FCC regulations for indecency and obscenity, including bleeping of profane language and pixelization of nudity, though other censoring does take place; the series purposefully had guests avoid using their last names, mainly for the protection of minors and outside third parties, and said mentions of last names by guests (except for the show's rotation of experts) are bleeped in line with this policy. Additionally, no "uncut" versions of the show exist, unlike with its rival/companion series Jerry Springer, which openly marketed uncensored content on home video.

== Internship promoting and telemarketing ==
Two well publicized advertising methods on Maury relate to the hiring of interns as well as polling the television audience with the allure of "valuable offers". The latter is also a promotional tactic used on the show Divorce Court.

The show is known for promoting an in-house "intern program", encouraging college students to apply for employment. In 2010, a United States Department of Education report indicated:

The talk show "Maury" is abusing government programs sponsored by the Department of Education. This production is attempting to prove that there is an overwhelming demand for interns and has solicited applications from hundreds of different institutions of higher learning. The interns are almost never hired; however, the production has applied under several clauses for government funding under claims that a large number of internships have been granted.

Maury, like several daytime programs, also had a phone-in survey segment, a feature which has drawn criticism from some as the survey also features third-party "valuable offers" which may offer the purchase of some kind of product, but also give an inroad to telemarketers around do not call lists, as the interaction technically counts as allowing those calls past do not call lists, and may place the number called from on 'do call' phone lists used by the telemarketing industry.

== Reception ==
=== Critical response ===
A retrospective review from NPR described the show as formulaic but "barrier-breaking", and described Povich's retirement as "the end of an era for a particular brand of uber-trashy daytime TV." In 2022, Katie Bain of Vice called "surreal, hypnotic television" and noted that it remained the number one syndicated talk show, but had received some criticism. In 2013, Cary O'Dell of PopMatters criticized the show for its increasing focus on paternity controversies at the expense of the "feel good" content in earlier seasons, writing that it had "all but abandoned any other type of content in favor of the test and its subsequent big reveal moments. Gone are the drag queens, surprise family reunions and anything else."

Some critics denounce Maury as being worse than other similar talk shows, such as Jerry Springer. Like such shows, it uses guests' serious problems for the entertainment of the viewing audience, but treated with an insincere sympathy. Whitney Matheson wrote about the show in her USA Today column, "Povich's talk show is, without a doubt, the worst thing on television. Period. Don't be fooled by the pressed shirt and pleated khakis; Maury is miles farther down the commode than Jerry Springer."

=== Cultural impact ===
The court show Paternity Court, which premiered on September 23, 2013, was inspired by Maury.

The show spawned the spin-off The Trisha Goddard Show, which premiered on September 17, 2012.

=== Awards and nominations ===
Awards and nominations
Award	Year (Note: Indicates the year of ceremony)	Category	Nominee(s)	Result	Ref.
GLAAD Media Awards	2005	Outstanding Talk Show Episode	"I Was Born a Woman...Today I'm a Man"	Nominated	
Daytime Emmy Awards	2017	Outstanding Talk Show Entertainment	Maury	Nominated	
