= The Jerry Springer Show =

American tabloid talk show (1991–2018)

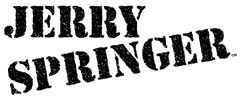
- Also known as: Jerry Springer
- Genre: Talk show
- Created by: Burt Dubrow
- Presented by: Jerry Springer
- Country of origin: United States
- Original language: English
- No. of seasons: 27
- No. of episodes: 3,891

Production
- Executive producers: Burt Dubrow (1991–1992); Richard Dominick (1994–2008); Rachelle Wilkos (2008–2015); Kerry Shannon (2015–2018)
- Production locations: Cincinnati (1991–1992); NBC Tower, Chicago (1992–2009); Stamford Media Center, Stamford (2009–2018)
- Running time: 42–43 minutes
- Production companies: Multimedia Entertainment (seasons 1–6); Richard Dominick Productions (season 17); Stamford Media Center Productions (seasons 21–27); Universal Television Enterprises (seasons 6–7); Studios USA Television Distribution (seasons 8–11); Universal Domestic Television (seasons 12–13); NBCUniversal Television Distribution (seasons 13–27)

Original release
- Network: Syndication
- Release: September 30, 1991 – July 26, 2018

Related
- Steve Wilkos

The Jerry Springer Show is an American daytime talk show that was hosted by Jerry Springer. The show ran in syndication for twenty-seven seasons from September 30, 1991, to July 26, 2018, in which it broadcast 3,891 episodes, produced for most of its time by NBCUniversal. It was taped at the NBC Tower in Chicago until 2009, when production moved to Stamford Studios in Connecticut. The show premiered as a traditional talk show, with a focus on political issues and current events. However, it reformatted into a tabloid talk show by 1993, with a greater emphasis on single-issue panel discussions with everyday people.

Initially produced by Multimedia, Inc., the program was unsuccessful in ratings in its first seasons due to its focus on more political issues. This led to an overhaul of the structure by the mid-1990s, eventually leading to the show as it is best known for, filled with controversial topics (such as incest and adultery), profanity, physical fights, (Note: Involving a mixture of slapping, boxing, wrestling, liquid spraying, food fights and use of martial arts with frequent interventions of security.) and scantily clad guests. Chanting, heckling, and nudity was often featured on the show, including flashing audience members for "Jerry Beads."

Critical response to the show was overwhelmingly negative; in 2002, TV Guide proclaimed it to be the worst TV show of all time. Despite this, it was highly popular, peaking in popularity around 1997 and 1998, and being a major force in the explosion of "trash TV" at the time. The critique of the show was satirically embraced by the show, with Springer proudly introducing the program as the "worst TV show in the history of television" at the start of each episode. After the show's cancellation, Springer hosted a new courtroom show titled Judge Jerry, which premiered on September 9, 2019, and is also distributed by NBCUniversal; it was canceled after three seasons in 2022.

== Format and content ==
Each episode of Jerry Springer began with Springer entering the stage and being greeted by a standing audience (made up of mostly college students) pumping the air with their right hand, chanting "Jerry! Jerry! Jerry!". Beginning in 2007, Springer would arrive on stage by sliding down a fireman's pole. He then shook hands with some of the audience members before introducing the episode's topic and guests. The topics were usually of an unsophisticated nature, such as infidelity and other relationship squabbles. Oftentimes, the guests would become emotional and get involved in heated arguments with one another; this would result in outbursts and physical fighting, and the audience chanting "Jerry! Jerry! Jerry!". On-screen security guards were present and tasked with managing the potential violence.

Once all the guests had told their stories, there was usually a "question and answer" segment where audience members asked guests questions. In earlier seasons, the questions tended to be serious. However, these questions gave way to insults as the show progressed. Throughout the show, some women in the audience would sometimes flash their breasts in exchange for "Jerry Beads" (Mardi Gras-style beads with the show logo). In later seasons, serious questions were typically mocked by the crowd with chants of "Go to Oprah!". Springer then ended the show by giving a formal lecture, sitting by himself on the stage, on the principles of refined values in regards to the featured guests. Springer's "final thought" segment ended with the concluding statement, "'Til next time, take care of yourselves and each other," which was his sign-off line during his days as a newscaster in Cincinnati.

Generally, Springer tended to present his program standing up, pacing the aisle steps between the seating areas, rather than having a podium or mark on the main stage. This was thought to be to protect himself from the potential violence occurring on the stage. He deliberately chose a role as straight man; he never directly involved himself in the arguments. "I'm always wearing a suit, I don't curse and I wasn't in fights involving Jell-O," Springer stated in retrospective.

Sometimes the show would have a look back at previous episodes. They had rebranded as Classic Springer, some with a false Masterpiece Theatre-like theme and patina. These shows were interspersed with commentary from Springer himself, usually before and after commercial breaks.

== Production ==
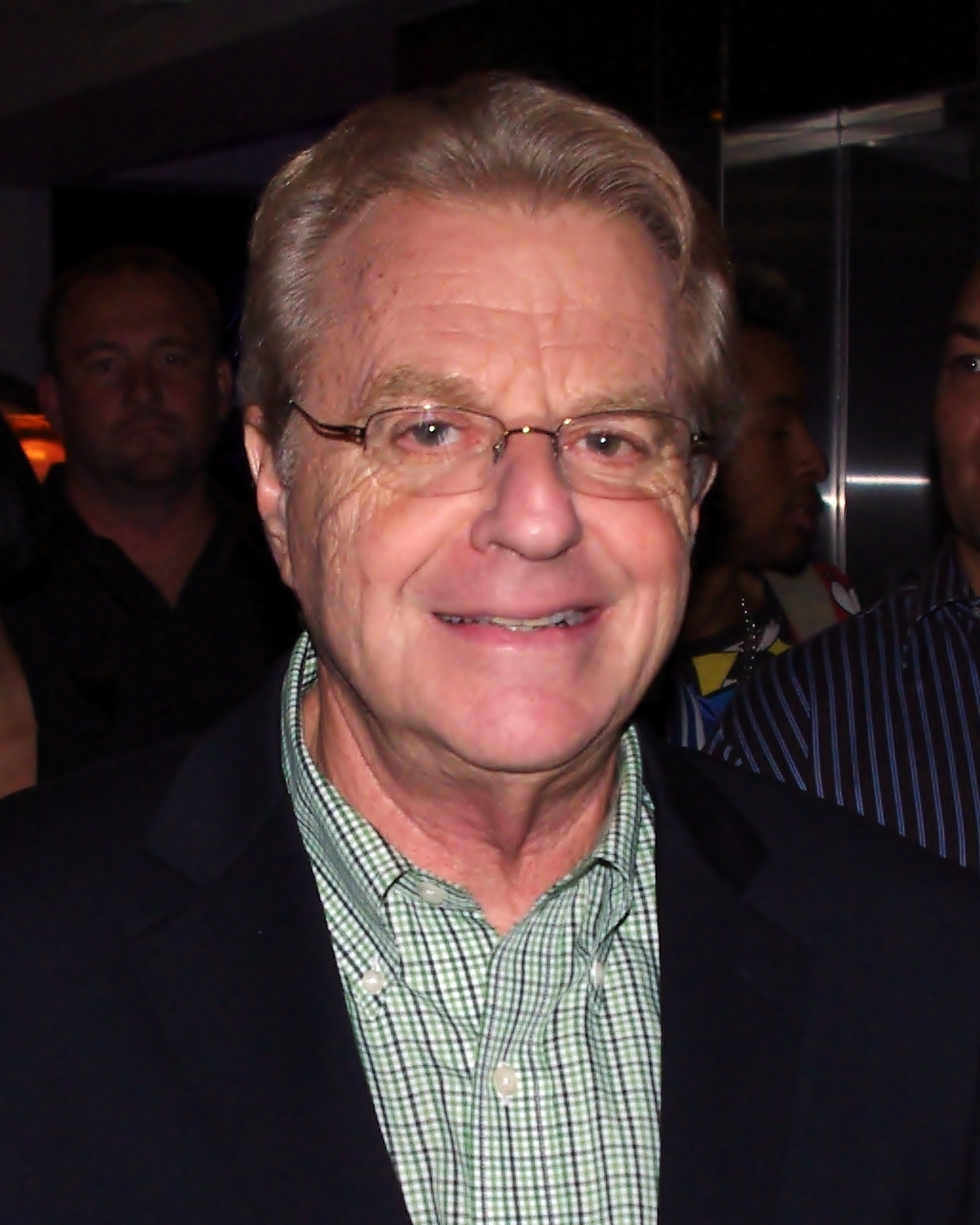
Former show host Jerry Springer in 2011

=== Set ===
According to NBC, the set for the show has had three major changes over the years. When the show first started in 1991, it was very basic with white walls, in an effort to capture the feel of fellow talk show Donahue, Jerry's haircut and glasses even seeming to make him look like Phil Donahue. The general look of this set was carried over when the series first moved to Chicago in September 1992, with an unpolished, open air look and bright colored shapes.

In the fall of 1994, a few months after the series underwent its format overhaul, the studio received a makeover to make it look a bit warmer and more inviting, complete with brick walls, artwork, and bookcases. The stage walls were designed so that they could be projected outward into the audience, making room for a catwalk that was used in shows such as the 1997 episode Stripper Wars! In late 2000, the whole set was changed to its "industrial" look, changes initially welcomed due to the reduced ratings of the 1999–2000 season. In 2007 the set was slightly changed, with a larger studio audience, bigger stage, and a balcony, which was above the stage and ended at the pole. Springer used this as his main entrance by sliding down the pole. The logo and stage design were carried across to the new studio in Stamford, Connecticut, with only a few changes and stayed as such until the end of the run.

=== Topic selection ===
The show was initially formatted as a traditional talk show, in which Springer discussed serious topics and interviewed high-profile guests such as Oliver North and Jesse Jackson. It eventually reformatted into a tabloid talk show, where it covered more unusual and sensational topics. Springer claimed that this reformat was meant to target younger viewers, with Ricki Lake serving as inspiration.

The show's premiere featured a family reunion.

The search for higher ratings led the program gradually towards provocative topics, becoming more successful as it became geared towards youthful viewers (modeled after Ricki Lake's popular talk show) by introducing more controversial topics. However, there were still some traditional and serious topics featured on the show at this time, even with the format change.

By December 1994, the show started featuring physical brawls and fights on stage for the first time in episodes like "High Class Hookers Tell All", "Holiday Hell with My Feuding Family", "My Boyfriend Turned Out to Be a Girl", and "I Want My Man to Stop Watching Porn!".

The Chicago Tribune's Steve Johnson described the typical episode topic as "Threesomes with Mom."

Frank Scheck of The Hollywood Reporter claimed that "[t]he show’s topics were a veritable smorgasbord of incest, pedophilia, adultery, hate groups, perversion, and humanity's worst instincts in general."

=== Guest and audience recruitment ===
The show booked over 30,000 guests.

== History ==
=== 1991–1994: Origins ===
Originally seen in only the five markets where Multimedia owned TV stations (Cincinnati, Macon, St. Louis, Cleveland, and Knoxville), it was dramatically different from the later version of the show. It started as an issues-oriented and political talk show, a longer version of the commentary for which Springer had gained local fame as a reporter and anchor (not unlike Donahue during this time), and for its first season, was even taped at Springer's former station, WLWT in Cincinnati. Guests early on included Oliver North and Jesse Jackson, and the topics included homelessness and gun politics, as well as the social effects of rock music, featuring shock rock star GG Allin, Eldon "El Duce" Hoke from Mentors and Gwar as guests.

For its second season in the fall of 1992, the series was purchased by the NBC owned-and-operated stations, thus allowing it to finally achieve full national distribution, and production was moved to its longtime home at Chicago's NBC Tower (with Springer leaving his longtime position at WLWT in order to do so). Series creator and original executive producer Burt Dubrow became Senior VP at Multimedia Entertainment and continued to oversee the show, while bringing in Terry Weible Murphy as executive producer.

=== 1994–2000: Overhaul and ratings success ===
In April 1994, Multimedia threatened cancellation if ratings didn't improve by that November, which led to a major overhaul that saw Murphy's departure and replacement by fellow Jerry Springer producer Richard Dominick, under Dubrow's purview. As part of the changes, the newer output contained more sex and conflict, but Multimedia became uncomfortable and told the producer to tone these themes down. In 1995, there were two performances by Comedy Central Latin star Jade Esteban Estrada on the show.

The Jerry Springer Show increasingly became a "freak show" where guests seek their 15 minutes of fame through discussion and demonstrations of deviant behavior. In 1996, Springer wanted people to send him videotapes explaining why they wanted Springer to tape a show in their home.

Universal Television took control of the show from Gannett, which was a turning point. Dominick, the producer, was allowed the freedoms he wished for, and the format began to change in January 1997. On-stage fights, which were previously cut for broadcast, were now openly aired. Brawls and crude topics became increasingly encouraged, and as a result, the show became a tremendous success. Two episodes that aired in February 1997 became the first on broadcast TV to be rated TV-M directly by the producers. In November of 1997, viewership of Jerry Springer was up 70 percent compared to the same time the previous year. In February 1998, it became the first show in over a decade to dethrone The Oprah Winfrey Show as the most watched TV show in a single week.

The Jerry Springer Show became arguably the biggest figure in the rise of "tastelessness" and "trash TV" in the late 1990s. It attracted ever more controversy, such as the episode "I Married a Horse" (May 1998), which several stations that carried Jerry Springer, including WLWT in Cincinnati where Springer was a news anchor, refused to broadcast, leading to it being pulled before airing. Additionally, Barry Diller, the head of Jerry Springer distributor Studios USA, ordered producers to eliminate physical fighting between guests, as he had reportedly become upset by the show and the controversies it sparked. Studios USA later permitted fights to remain as long as they were "toned down". The show remained popular, though it lost its position as the most-viewed daytime show by June 1999, finishing slightly behind The Oprah Winfrey Show.

=== 2000–2005: Continued controversies ===
Diller's demands to tone down the show, coupled with it losing the top spot in the ratings, led to speculation that Springer would seek a new distributor after his contract expired in 2000. However, he remained with Studios USA, signing a five-year deal worth $30 million. The same year, a married couple, Ralf and Eleanor Panitz, were guests on an episode of the show entitled "Secret Mistresses Confronted" with Panitz's ex-wife, Nancy Campbell-Panitz, in which they complained about Campbell-Panitz's behavior and accused her of stalking them. Hours after it was broadcast, on July 24, 2000, Campbell-Panitz was found dead in a home that the three were fighting over, and Florida police soon confirmed that they were treating the death as a homicide. It was then reported that Ralf Panitz, having been issued a first-degree murder warrant for the death, was trying to flee to Canada to avoid prosecution. Upon news of the 52-year-old woman's murder, a spokeswoman for the program issued a statement saying that it was "a terrible tragedy".

In August 2000, Springer appeared on CNN's Larry King Live to discuss the incident, claiming that it "had nothing to do with the show" and that his talk show does not glamorize deviant behavior. On March 27, 2002, after a 10-day trial and 18 hours of deliberating from jurors, Ralf Panitz was convicted of the murder and sentenced to life in prison.

In 2001, efforts by groups like the Parents Television Council and the American Family Association forced some advertisers to decrease or to stop their sponsorship of Jerry Springer. In the United Kingdom, the Independent Television Commission banned Jerry Springer and other tabloid talk programs from being shown on television during daytime hours on school holidays in response to numerous parental complaints and concerns about children's potential exposure to the salacious content (there was a short-running British version of the show made for ITV called The Springer Show that was lighter and more tongue-in-cheek).

In 2003, it was revealed that a group of guests from Hayward, California, faked a "love triangle" for an appearance on two episodes of the show; one guest in the group was murdered, but Hayward police determined that his appearance was not connected to his murder.

=== 2005–2009: Further changes and Wilkos spin-off ===
In January 2006, the show was renewed for its sixteenth season, ending speculation that Springer would leave his talk show to run for elected office in Ohio, where he briefly served as mayor of Cincinnati in the late 1970s. By this time, the show began to poke fun at itself by using the taglines "An Hour of Your Life You'll Never Get Back" and "Wasting Technology Since 1991". On May 12, 2006, Springer celebrated his show's 3,000th episode by throwing a party on the show (which no one but Jerry showed up to humorously), and showed many clips, including rare excerpts from the show. The year 2006 also saw the addition of fan favorite Reverend Shnorr, a drunken womanizing character who would often get into heated confrontations with guests while bringing a fresh comedic edge to the show. The character was created by then-promotions director Brian Schnoor while studying Improv at Chicago's famed Second City Theater in the 1990s. By December 2007, Rev. Shnorr merchandise was out-selling the show's popular security T-shirts on NBC's website.

In the United Kingdom, meanwhile, a Commercial High Court trial was scheduled for summer 2006 to resolve a dispute between Flextech Television and NBCUniversal over Flextech in 2002 canceling its 1998 contract to broadcast Jerry Springer in the UK as long as new episodes continued to be produced in the U.S.

On July 15, 2007, it was announced that Springer was picked up by NBC Universal through the 2009–2010 season. Also, VH1 ran a documentary series The Springer Hustle, going "behind the scenes" of the show, having already run another Springer-related documentary in 2005 titled When Jerry Springer Ruled the World. Springer's appearance on the NBC television network show America's Got Talent led to an increase in viewership for the first quarter of 2007. Steve Wilkos filled in for Springer during the beginning of America's Got Talent as well as when Springer was a contestant on Dancing With the Stars.

The security staff for the program also was given new additions, as starting in the seventeenth season, three female security guards were added. Certain professional athletes have come on the show as one-off security guards for some episodes. They include hockey players Joe Corvo and Adam Burish, and mixed martial arts fighters Andrei Arlovski, Shonie Carter, and Bas Rutten.

While certain advertisers continued to avoid buying ad time for Jerry Springer, the series continued to keep steady ratings in the February 2008 "sweeps" period.

Executive producer Richard Dominick resigned shortly after the start of the 18th season; Rachelle Consiglio, wife of Steve Wilkos and longtime senior producer, replaced Dominick. The set decorations added during the 17th season were removed.

=== 2009–2018: Move to Connecticut and final years ===
On May 19, 2009, the show recorded its last episode at WMAQ-TV's NBC Tower in Chicago, Illinois, where it had been videotaped since 1992, midway through the second season. Beginning with the 2009–10 season, production was moved to the Rich Forum at the Stamford Center for the Arts in Stamford, Connecticut, after NBCUniversal received tax credits from the state of Connecticut to move Springer, along with Maury and Steve Wilkos to the state, along with NBC Sports. Springer said he was not happy with the move, but understood the financial reasons for which it was being done, and was working to secure jobs for those on his staff who wished to move with the show. After moving to Stamford, the show went through a number of changes; the set became more highly colored with new lighting, new chairs for guests, two new security guards, and a change to its theme music.

The show aired its 20th anniversary episode, which was taped in Times Square, on October 27, 2010. Jerry Springer's twenty-first season premiered on September 19, 2011, debuting with new graphics. On September 17, 2012, Jerry Springer began airing in widescreen and 1080i, in conjunction with its 22nd-season premiere.

In October 2014, it was announced that the show had been renewed by NBC Universal through September 2018. The 25th season of Jerry Springer began on September 21, 2015. With the 25th season anniversary of the show, Rachelle Wilkos, wife of Steve Wilkos departed as the executive producer of the show. Wilkos would transition full-time as the executive producer of her husband's show, as Kerry Shannon, another longtime producer, was promoted as the show's new executive producer. Despite her departure from the show, Wilkos briefly remained with the show as a consultant.

On June 13, 2018, NBCUniversal ended production of new episodes of the show after 27 seasons. The show's final tapings took place on July 6, 2018, and its final episode aired on July 26, 2018, with reruns continuing on The CW until September 10, 2021 and in syndication until September 6, 2024. In his Final Thoughts of the last taping, Jerry said regarding his twenty five years and experience with his guests:

….folks just taking a moment, which they rarely, if ever, get, to let the world know what they are thinking or feeling or doing. Admittedly, it’s often crazy or outside the norm of accepted behavior, but what I’ve learned over our quarter century of shows is that deep down we are all alike….

== Controversies over authenticity and violence ==
In the late 1990s, The Jerry Springer Show was quite popular and controversial; the program was so popular that it caused contemporaries like Jenny Jones, Maury Povich, and Ricki Lake to "revamp" their own shows in order to improve ratings. However, major figures in television, along with many religious leaders, had called for the show's removal and considered it to be of bad taste. The phrase "Jerry Springer Nation" began to be used by some who see the program as being a bad influence on the morality of the United States.

In 1997 and 1998, the show reached its ratings peak, at one point becoming the first talk show in years to beat The Oprah Winfrey Show. It featured almost non-stop fighting between guests—5 to 12 per day during one April 1998 week—and religious figures and even other TV personalities complained. Chicago City Council suggested that if the fistfights and chair-throwing were real, then the guests should be arrested for committing acts of violence in the city, as alderman Ed Burke was concerned over the fact that the off-duty Chicago police officers serving as security guards for the program failed to take legal action against fighting guests. Springer explained that the violence on the program "look[ed] real" to him, also arguing that the fighting on the show "never, ever, ever glamorizes violence". Ultimately, the City Council chose not to pursue the matter. Because of this probe and other external and internal pressures, the fighting was taken off the show temporarily before being allowed again in a less violent nature. In the years of the show having toned down the fights, viewership declined but remained respectable by the newer standards of daytime television ratings.

There had been continuous debate over the authenticity of the fighting. In an interview, a production assistant stated that "we try our hardest to screen people," and inauthentic-seeming guests had been kicked off stage. Marvin Kitman, television critic for the Newsday newspaper, felt that the fighting had been choreographed beforehand. Christopher Sterling of the George Washington University media department compared the program to professional wrestling; some producers later claimed the fights on the show were inspired by the fights and angles in WWE. Sixteen former guests of Jerry Springer, who were interviewed on various U.S. media outlets such as the entertainment news program Extra, Rolling Stone, and the New York Post newspaper, claimed there was a "fight quota" for each episode, and that they and other guests were encouraged to fight one another. In the past, producers booked professional wrestlers such as The Iron Sheik, Razor Ramon (albeit in a non-fighting role), Jamie Dundee, 2 Tuff Tony, Madman Pondo, and One Man Kru (also a hip hop artist), as well as lady wrestlers and midget wrestlers; one guest would be a then-unknown Justin Roberts, then-primary ring announcer for WWE. Springer would later make guest appearances during WWE Raw on two occasions.

In screening potential cases for his next show Judge Jerry, Springer deliberately chose a process that picks cases from those that have already been filed, to prevent would-be litigants from seeking out the show as had been suspected with Jerry Springer.

Springer himself in 1998 called his own show "stupid" on The David Letterman Show. Springer stated in an October 2000 interview with the Reuters news agency:

I would never watch my show. I'm not interested in it. It's not aimed towards me. This is just a silly show.

== Censorship ==
All syndicated episodes of Jerry Springer were censored, regardless of time, to comply with Federal Communications Commission (FCC) broadcast decency standards. Initially, most profanity was bleeped. However, later episodes were bleeped for explicit language, sometimes to such an extent that speech became incomprehensible; along with the mouth being spot-blurred so that viewers could not read lips. In addition, nudity, flashing of breasts, buttocks, and genital areas; as well as the middle finger was pixelated. After longtime producer Richard Dominick left, the show reverted to the traditional style of bleeping, which remains in place today. A New York Times report from April 1998 found that each episode had about 85 to 130 bleeps.

== Broadcast history and release ==
Jerry Springer was syndicated worldwide. In the United States, it was distributed by Multimedia Entertainment and placed in first-run syndication on September 30, 1991. The show was later distributed by Universal and then Studios USA.

Episodes were available for individual purchase from Video Archives.

On June 13, 2018, the industry publication Broadcasting & Cable reported that the series had ceased production and that the 2018–19 season forward would solely consist of reruns. The final first-run episode aired on July 26, 2018. Springer had originally intended to retire after the show ended production; instead, NBCUniversal, interested in keeping his services, convinced him into working on a new courtroom show, to be called Judge Jerry.

The CW acquired rerun rights to the show to fill an hour in their daytime timeslot that previously aired The Robert Irvine Show. The CW, which began airing the show on September 10, 2018, has first right to the episodes that have been produced but remain unaired, which number in the "dozens". The CW also had the right to ask that production of the series be revived in the future. Reruns continued to air on The CW until it left the network on September 3, 2021 as a reorganizing of its programming lineup (replacing its daytime block with a Saturday night lineup, which neither the CW nor its predecessors have programmed since they launched in 1995). Reruns continued to air thereafter in broadcast syndication and on The CW Plus until September 6, 2024, when both ceased carrying the show in all markets, just nearly seventeen months after Springer's April 2023 death from pancreatic cancer.

== Reception ==
=== Television viewership and ratings ===
For a time, during 1998, it was the top-rated daytime talk show in the United States, drawing at least eight million viewers an episode.

By 2018, the show's ratings had dropped to about 1.7 million viewers per episode.

=== Critical response ===
New York listed it as one of the worst television shows of 1995 and the Chicago Tribune's Steve Johnson listed it as the second worst show of 1996. The show also topped TV Guide magazine's 2002 list of "The Worst TV Shows Ever"; for a time, the show itself would even frequently boast about this ranking in its opening credits as a form of self-deprecation. In 2005, the program became a subject of criticism in Bernard Goldberg's book 100 People Who Are Screwing Up America, being called "TV's lowest life-form" and Springer himself being ranked at 32 and labeled an "American Pioneer". Goldberg also claimed that Springer was knowingly capitalizing on the disadvantages of his guests and the stupidity of his audience, also citing the controversial episode revolving around the man who married his horse.

As the show's popularity peaked in 1998, a backlash grew against its tawdry content and increasing violence. Bob Iger, then chairman of ABC, dubbed it an embarrassment to the television industry, and then-U.S. Senator Joe Lieberman implored stations to stop broadcasting it. Many major companies refused to advertise on the show due to its reputation. Consequently, The New York Times reported that while the program had higher ratings than The Oprah Winfrey Show at the time, the cost of a 30-second advertisement was less than a third of that charged by Oprah. Most commercials during Jerry Springer were "1-800-number ads -- for technical schools, personal-injury law firms, mortgage lenders, insurance companies and health services".

Oprah Winfrey herself, in a 1999 interview with The Sunday Times, strongly criticized The Jerry Springer Show. Winfrey said “I am in disbelief about things that are happening on television talk shows,” “How low can it get? Can public taste keep on sinking? Yes, it can. I have to get out.”, hinting that she would quit her own show after her contract expires.

=== Cultural impact ===
In 1999, the show was parodied in the film Austin Powers: The Spy Who Shagged Me. Dr. Evil and his son Scott appear on the show to discuss being evil, which ends with Dr. Evil and Springer himself brawling onstage. Along with Springer, Steve Wilkos and Todd Schultz played themselves in the movie.

In 2003, a British opera inspired by the series, Jerry Springer: The Opera, began playing in the United Kingdom.

On January 7, 2025, Netflix released a documentary about the show, Jerry Springer: Fights, Camera, Action.

== Spin-offs ==
=== The Steve Wilkos Show ===
By 2005, security director Steve Wilkos became a cult figure on his own; Wilkos would close each show walking down a hallway engaging in casual talk with one of the more colorful guests of the preceding episode. He also would occasionally host the show. Episodes that he hosted were intended to be more serious in tone than the typical episode of Jerry Springer. Wilkos left Jerry Springer at the end of the 2006–2007 season to pursue a spin-off talk show, The Steve Wilkos Show. It was also shot at the NBC Tower in Chicago and produced by Richard Dominick, who continued to produce Jerry Springer as well.

=== Too Hot for TV ===
During the show's most popular era in the mid- to late-1990s, Jerry Springer released videotapes and later DVDs marketed as Too Hot for TV, beginning in October, 1997. They contained uncensored nudity, profanity, and explicit violence (such as punches and slaps deemed too intense for daytime television) that was edited out of broadcasts in order to conform to FCC standards for television broadcast decency and suitability. The releases sold and rented remarkably well and inspired similar sets from other series. Eventually, the show started producing similar "uncensored" monthly pay-per-view/video on demand specials as well as part of In Demand's Too Much for TV brand of PPV/on-demand content.

In 2015, Springer brought the Too Hot for TV format to the WWE Network for a series of episodes featuring WWE's most controversial segments.

=== The Springer Show ===
In 1999, ITV made 12 British-based version episodes of the series Jerry Springer UK, filmed at the same studios as his American show.

In 2005, another British version was shown made for ITV titled The Springer Show as a replacement for Trisha Goddard, which defected to Channel 5. Initially, Springer only signed a one-month deal. It beat its talk-show rival Trisha Goddard five to one in the ratings, despite it being a subdued and more tongue-in-cheek version of the American show. The 20-episode series was broadcast from June 6, 2005, until July 1. The remaining 10 episodes broadcast from September 5 until September 16, 2005, when The Jeremy Kyle Show fully replaced the show.

=== Ça va se savoir! ===
From 2002 to 2008, a French-Belgian version of the show was produced, hosted by Simon Monceau. For most of its run, it was produced and recorded in Belgium. Contrary to the original version, Ça va se savoir ! clearly made public that the show's guests were in fact actors, which was also indicated during the end titles.

=== Other versions ===
Legend: Currently airing Ended Unknown version

Country	Local title	Host(s)	Network	Start date	End date
Belgium; France	Ça va se savoir !	Simon Monceau	AB3	March 25, 2002	July 2008
Brazil	Você na TV	João Kleber	RedeTV	April 8, 2013	September 30, 2022
Greece; Cyprus	Επιτέλους Μαζί; Από Καρδιάς	Andreas Mikroutsikos	ANT1; Alpha TV	September 1996; September 12, 2005	July 2000; June 30, 2006
Greece; Cyprus	Μια νέα αρχή	Sia Liaropoulou	STAR Channel	October 20, 1997	June 1998
Greece; Cyprus	Τα μυστικά της αγάπης	Sia Liaropoulou	STAR Channel	October 19, 1998	June 2000
India	Jerry di Adalat	unknown	Spark Punjabi TV	unknown	unknown
Russia	Окна; Okna	Dmitri Nagiev	TNT (2002–2005); STS (2002)	May 20, 2002	April 29, 2005
Russia	Пусть говорят Pust' Govoryat	Andrey Malakhov (2005–2017); Dmitri Borisov (2017–present)	Channel One Russia	July 23, 2001 (Note: Official name used from August 30, 2005)	present
Russia	Говорим и показываем Govorim i pokazyvaem	Leonid Zakoshansky	NTV	2011	April 2017
Russia	Прямой эфир Pryamoy Efir	Mikhail Zelensky (2011–2013); Boris Korchevnikov (2013–2017); Alexander Yakovlev (2023—present); Anton Demidov (2023—present)	Russia-1	April 4, 2011	present
Russia	Андрей Малахов. Прямой эфир Andrei Malakhov. Pryamoy Efir	Andrei Malakhov	Russia-1	October 19, 2017	February 22, 2022
Russia	Малахов; Malakhov	Andrei Malakhov	Russia-1	June 17, 2022 (Note: Postponed from February 28 to June 17, 2022 due to the political situation in Russia and Ukraine)	Present
Thailand	unknown	unknown	unknown	unknown	unknown
Ukraine	Про життя	Andriy Palchevskyi	Inter	28 May 2012	30 May 2013
United Kingdom	Jerry Springer UK	Jerry Springer	ITV	September 20, 1999	October 19, 1999
United Kingdom	The Springer Show	Jerry Springer	ITV	June 6, 2005	September 16, 2005
United States	Jerry Springer	Jerry Springer	Syndication, The CW	September 30, 1991	July 26, 2018

== See also ==
- The Jenny Jones Show
- The Richard Bey Show
