= NBCUniversal Syndication Studios =

American distributor group owned by NBCUniversal through Comcast

- Trade name: MCA Television Enterprises (1948–1996); Universal Television Enterprises (1996–1997); Studios USA Television Distribution (1997–2002); Universal Domestic Television (2002–2004); NBC Universal Television Distribution (2004–2011); NBCUniversal Television Distribution (2011–2021); NBCUniversal Syndication Studios (2021–present)
- Formerly: MCA Television Limited (1948–1996); Universal Television Enterprises, Inc. (1996–1998); Studios USA Television Distribution LLC (1998–2002)
- Type: Division
- Industry: Television syndication
- Predecessors: List: NBC Enterprises; Universal Worldwide Television; Multimedia Entertainment; PolyGram Television/ITC Entertainment; Universal Pictures Visual Programming (formerly PolyGram Visual Programming); Sky Vision
- Founded: 1948; 78 years ago (as MCA Television Ltd.); December 9, 1996; 29 years ago (as Universal Television Enterprises); September 13, 2004; 22 years ago (as NBC Universal Television Distribution)
- Headquarters: Philadelphia, Pennsylvania; Manhattan, New York City, New York; Universal City, California
- Key people: Frances Manfredi (President, US & Canada, 2015)
- Parent: MCA (1948–1996); Universal Studios (1996–1997); USA Networks (1997–2002); Vivendi Universal Entertainment (2002–2004); NBCUniversal Media Group (2004–present)

NBCUniversal Syndication Studios, formerly known as NBCUniversal Television Distribution, Universal Domestic Television, Studios USA Television Distribution and MCA TV (stylized as NBCUniversal SYNDICATION STUDIOS), is the television syndication division of NBCUniversal, a division of Comcast, in the United States. Its predecessors include NBC Enterprises, Universal Television Distribution, Multimedia Entertainment (including Avco Program Sales), PolyGram Television (formerly ITC Entertainment), and Sky Vision. At some point in its history, it was also known as "NBCUniversal Television & New Media Distribution" and "NBC Universal Television and New Media Distribution.” This unit is possibly the parent for the similarly named "NBCUniversal Domestic Television Distribution" unit.

The company distributes television series produced by NBC (after 1973), Universal Television, Multimedia Entertainment, Studios USA, Revue Studios, PolyGram Television (except the ITC library), Universal Media Studios and G4 Media, LLC. The division distributes the film libraries of Universal Pictures, the 1929–49 Paramount Pictures library (owned by EMKA, Ltd.), all 1996–99 PolyGram Filmed Entertainment films (as well as PolyGram Visual Programming), USA Films, StudioCanal (International only), Focus Features, Universal Animation Studios, Summit Entertainment (until 2012), Open Road Films, DreamWorks Animation, and DreamWorks Classics.

The operating name was changed to reflect the NBCUniversal brand between September 13, 2004 and January 31, 2011 (the name Universal Television Enterprises LLC is still used on first-run syndicated shows as part of the copyright notice). NUTD is considered the third broadcast syndication arm of NBC, with NBC Enterprises being the second and NBC Films (now part of CBS Media Ventures) as the first, dating back to summer 1948. NUTD is also considered the sixth broadcast syndication arm of Universal Television with MCA TV as the first, Universal Television Enterprises as the second, Studios USA Television Distribution as the third, Universal Domestic Television as the fourth, and Universal Television Distribution as the fifth.

== Background ==
Logo used as NBCUniversal Television Distribution.

=== NBC Enterprises ===
In June 14, 1948, NBC, already pioneering radio and television, was the jump into the broadcast syndication bandwagon when NBC hired Jack Russell Johnston to form its newly-formed division, Television Features Service, a division of NBC, marking the first time, a network had owned a broadcast syndication division.

Russell Johnston later left in 1949, and was succeeded by John B. Cron, who was hired earlier this year, to elevate its film syndication activities, and under his leadership, it was renamed to NBC-TV Film Syndicate Sales. It was evolved and NBC distributed a television version of the hit NBC radio program Dangerous Assignment for first-run syndication in 1951.

In June 1952, Robert Sarnoff, the owner of RCA announced that NBC is reorganizing their film activities through the supervision of its new film division of NBC, called NBC Film Division (later NBC Film Programs and NBC Television Films), which absorbed its syndication assets of NBC-TV Film Syndicate Sales. In 1953, NBC Film Division write a policy stating that no station preference was shown as a first-come first-served basis application regardless of its NBC affiliation.

In 1955, NBC bought out Kagran Corporation, which was then renamed to California National Productions (CNP) for merchandising, syndication and opera stage production. In 1956, NBC Film Division was then migrated to Kagran, which was then renamed to NBC Television Films, and after that the parent Kagran Corporation was renamed to CNP. The subsidiary started producing The Silent Service that year. By 1957, NBC planned to remove the opera department from CNP and Earl Rettig was named president. CNP was also in discussion with MGM Television about handling distribution for the latter's series.

In February 1958, the NBC Television Films division of California National Productions, was split into two, NBC Television Films was used for newer material, while reruns bore the new label, Victory Program Sales. The split was reversed in 1960, and reverted to fully NBC Television Films. In 1961, California National Productions was renamed to NBC Films.

In 1971, the company begin syndicating the ABC television western The Guns of Will Sonnett, which was one of a few times NBC had to distribute a program not actually airing on the network.

Following the Financial Interest and Syndication Rules in 1971, NBC had to divest the NBC Films unit to National Telefilm Associates, while programs from NBC News continued to be distributed internationally by NBC Enterprises for $7.5 million. Soon afterwards, Jim Victory, who was an employee of NBC Films division of the NBC Enterprises since 1971 after leaving Viacom, formed its own syndication company, Jim Victory Television, who took the distribution rights of Concentration with them.

In 1987, NBC Enterprises decided to break up into 5 units, which integrated most of the NBC Enterprises assets into NBC-TV, and a new division, NBC Operations & Services was created, with some of the assets being integrated into the NBC Corporate Communications unit, and the merchandising and foreign sales branch of NBC Enterprises became part of NBC-TV, and the guest relations and studio tours branch was integrated into NBC Corporate Communications. In 1991, NBC licensed the syndication rights of Saved by the Bell to Rysher Entertainment.

In 1993, while the Fin-Syn rules were relaxed, NBC had returned to distributing off-net syndicated reruns of their programming. In 2000, NBC Enterprises had officially launched its own syndicated division NBC Enterprises & Syndication, with former Eyemark Entertainment executive Ed Wilson as the head of the division.

In 2001, NBC Enterprises made a deal with Hearst-Argyle Television Productions to deal with their programming alliance to produce first-run syndicated series. In 2002, NBC inked a deal with MGM Television to launch a media sales operation, called MGM-NBC Media Sales.

=== From MCA Television to Studios USA Domestic Television ===
MCA Television Enterprises (commonly known as MCA TV and also known as MCA Television Limited) was founded in 1948, several years before parent MCA Inc.'s purchase of Decca Records (in 1959) and Universal Pictures (in 1962). For more than four decades, it was one of the most active syndicators of television programming. In 1954, it formed an alliance with producer Don Fedderson, through his Don Fedderson Productions company, and the first show to be formed under the alliance was The Millionaire, which spawned a five-year run on the air.

In 1957, it bought out the rights to the pre-1950 Paramount sound library and created a shell holding company, EMKA, Ltd.

During the 1980s, it distributed both off-network reruns of shows like Kate & Allie and Gimme a Break!, as well as original first-run syndication product like the animated action series Bionic Six (co-produced with TMS Entertainment), The Morton Downey Jr. Show (taped at then-MCA owned WWOR-TV in Secaucus, New Jersey), The Munsters Today (a revival of the Universal sitcom), and Pictionary, based on the board game.

In 1984, MCA TV entered into broadcasting reruns by starting Encore Programs, which reran various shows that went into syndication.

MCA Television attempted several branded TV packages from 1985 to 2001, including an ad-hoc film network, a broadcast network and a few syndicated programming blocks. The company launched the Universal Pictures Debut Network, an ad-hoc film network with plans to launch in two stages beginning in September 1985. In September 1989, MCA TV and Paramount Domestic Television had formed Premier Advertiser Sales, a joint venture created for the sale of advertising for their existing syndicated programs. As a possible outgrowth of this sales joint venture, MCA and Paramount began plans for a new network, the Premier Program Service. However, plans for the service halted thanks to objections from Fox, annoyed that MCA and Paramount were soliciting some of their affiliates for PPS. In the meantime, MCA teamed up with BHC Communications for a syndicated block; the Hollywood Premiere Network, that only lasted for the 1990–1991 season. The Universal Family Network syndicated programming block was launched by the company in the fall of 1993 with a single weekly half hour show, Exosquad, as a counter to The Disney Afternoon. The Action Pack was also launched by MCA to syndicate action-adventure programming.

In 1987, MCA TV decided to embark on the most ambitious slate of first-run syndicated programming and had hopes that if all seven could go to series, MCA TV would receive a payment of $50.7 million and reveals two new sitcoms, an action-adventure hour, and a cop show strip that was filmed on location, and The Street, which is planning on to be produced by another MCA network subsidiary, Universal Television, would be planned for a late-night audience. That year, MCA TV renewed the agreement with Tribune Broadcasting for rights to Charles in Charge and Bustin Loose, then-two of the strongest MCA TV programs, up until 1989. In 1989, MCA TV was signed on as syndicator of Inside Story, which was produced by Sunbeam Television-owned Fox affiliate WSVN, and went nationwide as their new title Inside Report, but it only lasted one season on the air.

In 1993, MCA Television had launched a joint effort with Brandon Tartikoff and his new Moving Target Productions company for a development of a late night talk show. The same year on May 10, MCA TV and Columbia Pictures Television formed their barter sales divisions. MCA called their division MCA TV Advertiser Sales.

In December 1996, MCA was renamed as Universal Studios. As a result, MCA TV was renamed as Universal Television Enterprises; at this time they also assumed production and distribution of several daytime talk shows previously produced by Multimedia Entertainment (which MCA had acquired), including The Jerry Springer Show. In 1997, it was sold again, along with the network unit, to USA Networks, which was renamed as Studios USA Domestic Television in 1998.

EMKA, Ltd. is the holding company responsible for a majority of the pre-1950 Paramount Pictures sound library. As an official part of the Universal Pictures library, they are part of the company's television unit, Universal Television.

=== PolyGram Television/Universal Worldwide Television ===
In 1997, PolyGram created a television division to distribute first-run syndicated and network series, hiring Bob Sanitsky from ICM Partners to be president of the division. The new unit absorbed the domestic syndication unit of ITC Entertainment (acquired by PolyGram in 1995), including its domestic sales president Matt Cooperstein. This company called PolyGram Television, is unrelated to an earlier domestic syndication television distribution arm of the same name that PolyGram also owned that was formed in 1981 and it was closed in 1983, and sold its assets to King Features Entertainment.

The division's first project was the syndication of new episodes of Alliance Atlantis' Due South, distributing 22 new episodes for primetime or weekend afternoon slots. It was distributed in conjunction with Worldvision Enterprises for ad sales. The unit also syndicated action hour series such as The Crow: Stairway to Heaven (based on the Miramax film with Brandon Lee. The Walt Disney Company, its owner at the time had passed on the series) and Total Recall 2070, as well as the music variety program Motown Live.

In early 1999, Shortly after Seagram and Universal completed their deal to acquire PolyGram. PolyGram Television was absorbed into Universal's TV and Networks division (which consisted of Universal's international television operations). Universal would sell the ITC film and television library to Carlton Communications, and the pre-1996 film library to MGM. Following this, PolyGram Television was renamed Universal Worldwide Television, and in the fall of that year, Universal Worldwide Television launched a successful realty strip, Blind Date (which gained a sister program from the same producers, The 5th Wheel). At the same time, Universal launched Universal Studios Network Programming to inherit the Brillstein-Grey productions, such as the upcoming Work with Me, and the existing Brillstein-Grey shows Just Shoot Me! and The Steve Harvey Show.

By 2001, rumors began circulating about the closure of the division (and its two series would have been sold off to another syndicator). However, by October, UWT's head of sales said the closure would not happen.

In June 2002, after Vivendi Universal re-acquired the entertainment arm of USA Networks, Universal Worldwide Television was merged with Studios USA Domestic Television to form Universal Television Enterprises, with Universal Domestic Television and Universal Television Distribution acting as subsidiaries of the company. Lori Shackel immediately left her position as vice president of the company.

== History ==
NBC Universal Television Distribution was formed in 2004 from a merger between NBC Enterprises and Universal Television Distribution. In 2004, it broke their ties with MGM Television to launch a standalone distribution operation. In 2011, NBC Universal dropped its space from all of its television divisions, becoming the CamelCase style format NBCUniversal.

In 2014, Hulu Plus reached an agreement with the company to allow streaming of television programs from NBCUniversal's series aired the previous year.

On October 5, 2020, NBCUniversal Television Distribution was renamed as NBCUniversal Syndication Studios, in an effort to drop "Television" from its branding. On December 2, 2020, NBCUniversal Syndication Studios announced that Law & Order: Special Victims Unit would air on a daily strip for syndication.

On March 13, 2026, NBCUniversal Syndication Studios announced that it was ending all of its first-run syndication programs, ending several daytime shows including Access Hollywood, Access Daily, Karamo, and The Steve Wilkos Show. This came one month after it was announced that The Kelly Clarkson Show would come to an end. Karamo ended on May 26, 2026, The Kelly Clarkson Show ended on August 31, 2026, Access Daily ended on September 10, 2026, Access Hollywood ended on September 11, 2026 and The Steve Wilkos Show ended on October 7, 2026.

== Off-net programming ==
- Chicago P.D. (2018–present)
- Dateline (2017–present; re-cuts of true crime episodes for syndication)
- Law & Order (1990–2010 & 2022–present)
- Law & Order: Special Victims Unit (1999–present)

== See also ==
- List of NBCUniversal television programs
