= Boston University =

Private university in Boston, Massachusetts, US

- Latin: Universitas Bostoniensis
- Former names: Newbury Biblical Institute (1838–1847); Methodist General Biblical Institute (1847–1867); Boston Theological Seminary (1867–1869); Boston Theological Institute (1869–1871)
- Motto: "Learning, Virtue, Piety"
- Type: Private research university
- Established: April 24, 1839; 187 years ago
- Accreditation: NECHE
- Religious affiliation: Nonsectarian, but historically affiliated with the United Methodist Church
- Academic affiliations: AAU; IAMSCU; NAICU; URA; Space-grant
- Endowment: $4.045 billion (2025)
- President: Melissa L. Gilliam
- Provost: Colin Duckett
- Faculty: 3,412 full-time, 1,122 part-time
- Students: 38,093 (fall 2025)
- Undergraduates: 18,253 (fall 2025)
- Postgraduates: 18,341 (fall 2025)
- Location: Boston, Massachusetts, United States; 42°20′56″N 71°06′01″W
- Campus: 169 acres (0.68 km^{2}); Large city
- Other campuses: Bedford; Los Angeles; Washington, D.C.; London; Paris; Sydney; Online
- Newspaper: The Daily Free Press
- Colors: Scarlet and white
- Nickname: Terriers
- Sporting affiliations: NCAA Division I – Patriot League; Hockey East; NEISA; EARC; EAWRC
- Mascot: Rhett the Boston Terrier
- Website: bu.edu

Boston University (BU) is a private research university in Boston, Massachusetts, United States. BU was founded in 1839 by a group of Boston Methodists with its original campus in Newbury, Vermont. It was chartered in Boston in 1869. The university is a member of the Association of American Universities and the Boston Consortium for Higher Education.

The university has nearly 38,000 students and more than 4,000 faculty members and is one of Boston's largest employers. It offers bachelor's degrees, master's degrees, doctorates, and medical, dental, business, and law degrees through 17 schools and colleges on three urban campuses. BU athletic teams compete in the Patriot League and Hockey East conferences, and their mascot is Rhett the Boston Terrier. The Boston University Terriers compete in NCAA Division I.

The university is nonsectarian, though it retains its historical affiliation with the United Methodist Church. The main campus is situated along the Charles River in Boston's Fenway–Kenmore and Allston neighborhoods, while the Boston University Medical Campus is located in Boston's South End neighborhood. The Fenway campus houses the Wheelock College of Education and Human Development, formerly Wheelock College, which merged with BU in 2018. The university is classified among "R1: Doctoral Universities – Very high research activity".

== History ==
Boston University traces its roots to the establishment of the "Newbury Biblical Institute" in Newbury, Vermont, in 1839, and was chartered with the name "Boston University" by the Massachusetts Legislature when it moved there in 1869. The university organized formal centennial observances both in 1939 and 1969. One or the other, or both dates, may appear on various official seals used by different schools of the university.

=== In Vermont and New Hampshire ===
On April 24–25, 1839, a group of Methodist ministers and laymen at the Old Bromfield Street Church in Boston elected to establish a Methodist theological school. Set up in Newbury, Vermont, the school was named the "Newbury Biblical Institute".

In 1847, the Congregational Society in Concord, New Hampshire, invited the institute to relocate to Concord and offered a disused Congregational church building with a capacity of 1200 people. Other citizens of Concord covered the remodeling costs. One stipulation of the invitation was that the Institute remain in Concord for at least 20 years. The charter issued by New Hampshire designated the school the "Methodist General Biblical Institute", but it was commonly called the "Concord Biblical Institute".

=== In Beacon Hill ===
With the agreed twenty years coming to a close, the trustees of the Concord Biblical Institute purchased 30 acres (120,000 m^{2}) on Aspinwall Hill in Brookline, Massachusetts, as a possible relocation site. The institute moved in 1867 to 23 Pinkney Street in the Beacon Hill neighborhood of Boston, and received a Massachusetts Charter as the "Boston Theological Seminary".

In 1869, three trustees of the "Boston Theological Institute" obtained from the Massachusetts Legislature a charter for a university by the name of "Boston University". These trustees were successful Boston businessmen and Methodist laymen with a history of involvement in educational enterprises, and they became the founders of Boston University. They were Isaac Rich (1801–1872), Lee Claflin (1791–1871), and Jacob Sleeper (1802–1889), for whom Boston University's three West Campus dormitories were later named. Lee Claflin's son, William, was then Governor of Massachusetts and signed the University Charter on May 26, 1869, after it was passed by the Legislature.

As reported by Kathleen Kilgore in her book Transformations, A History of Boston University (see Further reading), the founders directed the inclusion in the Charter of the following provision, unusual for its time:

No instructor in said University shall ever be required by the Trustees to profess any particular religious opinions as a test of office, and no student shall be refused admission ... on account of the religious opinions he may entertain; provided, nonetheless, that this section shall not apply to the theological department of said University.

Every department of the new university was also open to all on an equal footing regardless of sex, race, or (with the exception of the School of Theology) religion.

Boston Theological Institute was absorbed into Boston University in 1871 as the BU School of Theology.

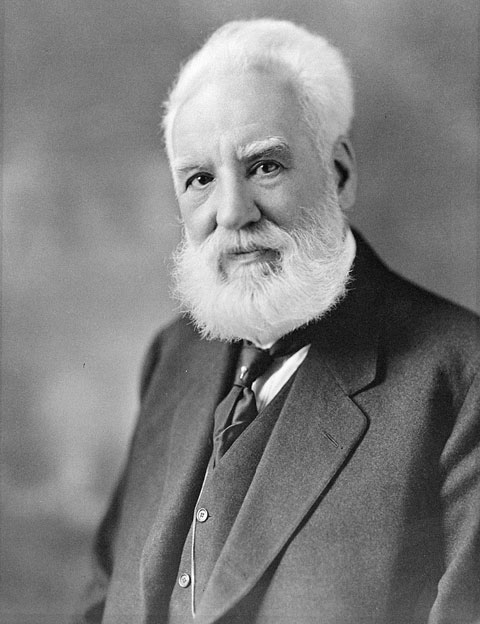
Alexander Graham Bell, who invented the telephone at Boston University

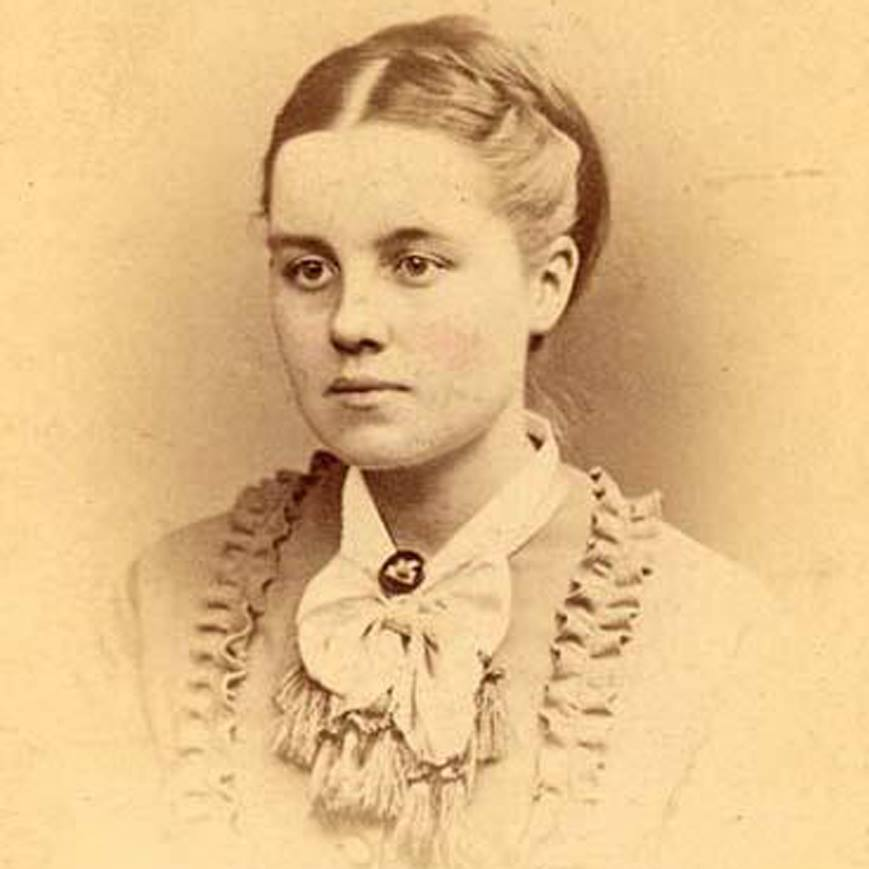
Helen Magill White, who, in 1877, was the first woman to receive a PhD from an American university

On January 13, 1872, Isaac Rich died, leaving the vast bulk of his estate to a trust that would go to Boston University after ten years of growth while the university was organized. Most of this bequest consisted of real estate throughout the core of the city of Boston, which was appraised at more than $1.5 million. Kilgore describes this as the largest single donation to an American college or university as of that time. By December, however, the Great Boston Fire of 1872 had destroyed all but one of the buildings Rich had left to the university, and the insurance companies with which they had been insured were bankrupt. The value of his estate, when turned over to the university in 1882, was half what it had been in 1872.

As a result, the university was unable to build its contemplated campus on Aspinwall Hill, and the land was sold piecemeal as development sites. Street names in the area, including Claflin Road, Claflin Path, and University Road, are the only remaining evidence of university ownership in this area. Following the fire, Boston University established its new facilities in buildings scattered throughout Beacon Hill, and later expanded into the Boylston Street and Copley Square area.

After receiving a year's salary advance to allow him to pursue his research in 1875, Alexander Graham Bell, then a professor at the school, invented the telephone in a Boston University laboratory. In 1876, Borden Parker Bowne was appointed professor of philosophy. Bowne, an important figure in the history of American religious thought, was an American Christian philosopher and theologian in the Methodist tradition. He is known for his contributions to personalism, a philosophical branch of liberal theology. The movement he led is often referred to as Boston Personalism.

The university continued its tradition of openness in this period. In 1877, Boston University became the first American university to award a PhD to a woman, when classics scholar Helen Magill White earned hers with the thesis "The Greek Drama". Then, in 1878, Anna Oliver became the first woman to receive a degree in theology in the United States, but the Methodist Church would not ordain her. Lelia J. Robinson, who graduated from the university's law school in 1881, became the first woman admitted to the bar in Massachusetts. Solomon Carter Fuller, who graduated from the university's School of Medicine in 1897, became the first black psychiatrist in the United States and would make significant contributions to the study of Alzheimer's disease.

=== Move to current campus and expansion ===
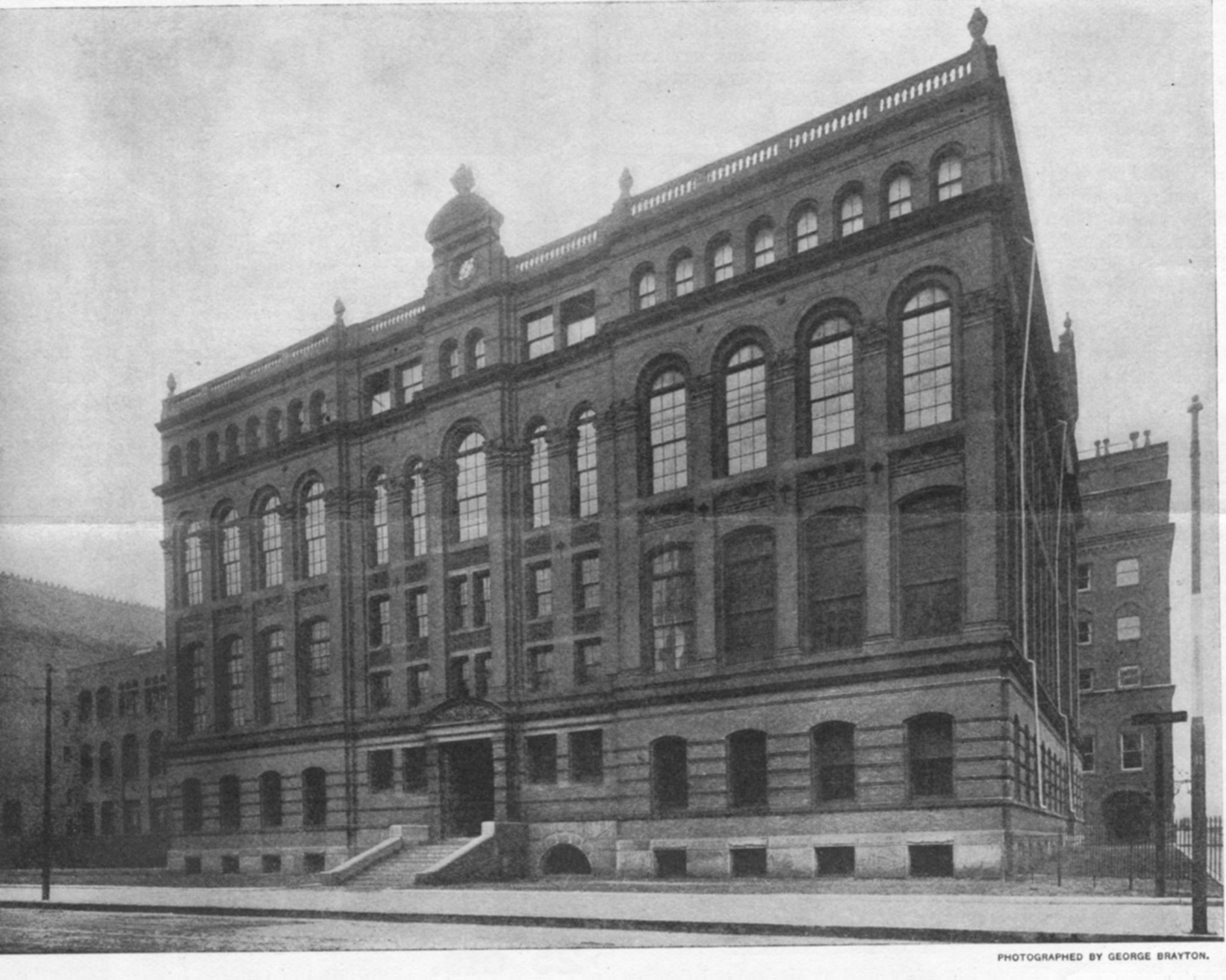
688 Boylston Street in Boston, the early home of the College of Liberal Arts, the precursor to Boston University College of Arts and Sciences, c. 1907

Seeking to unify a geographically scattered school and enable it to participate in the development of the city, school president Lemuel Murlin arranged that the school buy the present campus along the Charles River. Between 1920 and 1928, the school bought the 15 acres (61,000 m^{2}) of land that had been reclaimed from the river by the Riverfront Improvement Association. Plans for a riverside quadrangle with a Gothic Revival administrative tower modeled on the "Old Boston Stump" in Boston, England were scaled back in the late 1920s when the State Metropolitan District Commission used eminent domain to seize riverfront land for Storrow Drive.

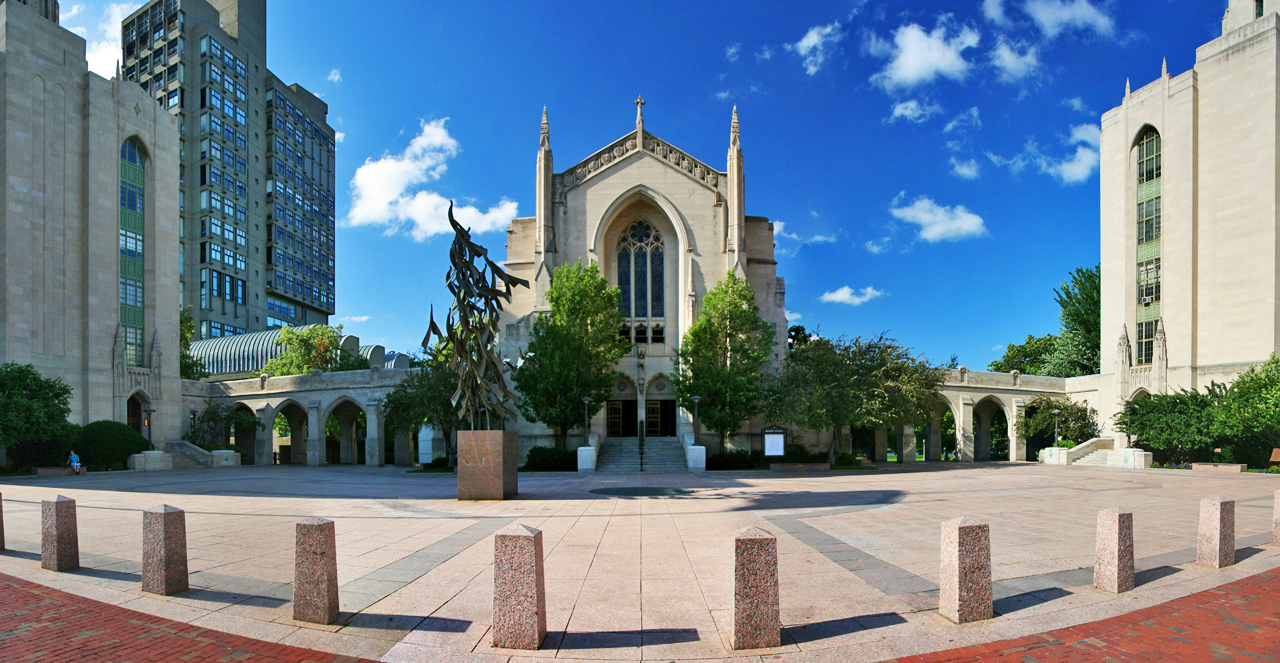
Marsh Plaza and its surrounding buildings, one of the first completed sections of the Charles River campus

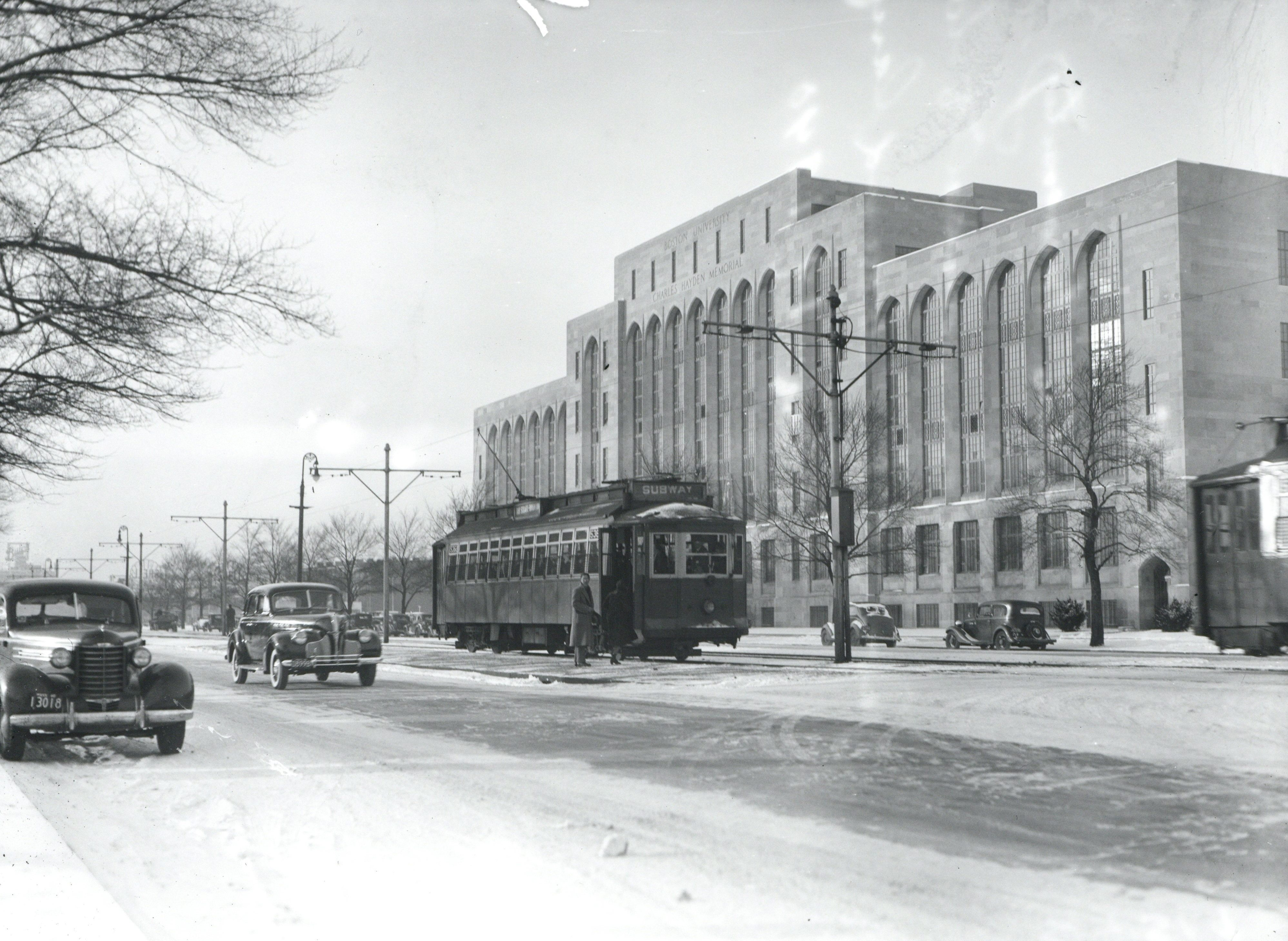
Commonwealth Avenue in the 1930s

Murlin was never able to build the new campus, but his successor, Daniel L. Marsh, led a series of fundraising campaigns (interrupted by both the Great Depression and World War II) that helped Marsh to achieve his dream and to gradually fill in the university's new campus. By spring 1936, the student body included 10,384 men and women.

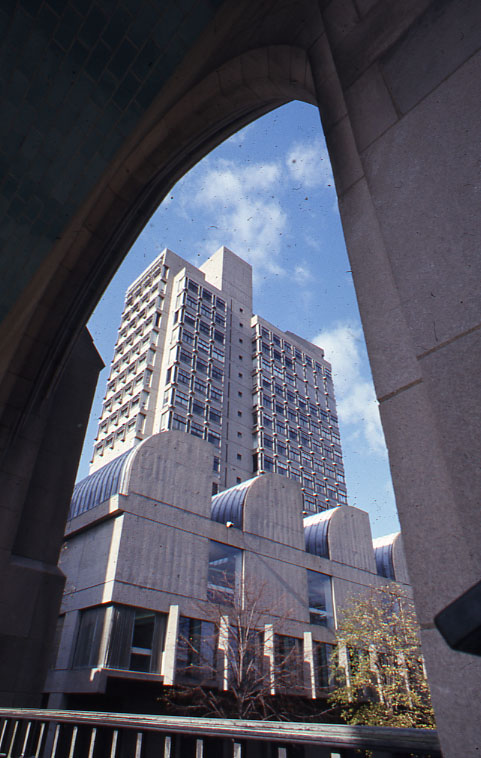
Josep Lluís Sert's buildings expanded the campus in the 1960s

In 1951, Harold C. Case became the school's fifth president and under his direction the character of the campus changed significantly, as he sought to change the school into a national research university. The campus tripled in size to 45 acres (180,000 m^{2}), and added 68 new buildings before Case retired in 1967. The first large dorms, Claflin, Rich and Sleeper Halls in West Campus were built, and in 1965 construction began on 700 Commonwealth Avenue, later named Warren Towers, designed to house 1800 students.

Between 1961 and 1966, the BU Law Tower, the George Sherman Union, and the Mugar Memorial Library were constructed in the Brutalist style, a departure from the school's traditional architecture. The College of Engineering and College of Communication were housed in a former stable building and auto-show room, respectively. Besides his efforts to expand the university into a rival for Greater Boston's more prestigious academic institutions, such as Harvard University and the Massachusetts Institute of Technology (both in Cambridge across the Charles River from the BU campus), Case involved himself in the start of the student/societal upheavals that came to characterize the 1960s.

When a mini-squabble over editorial policy at college radio WBUR-FM – whose offices were under a tall radio antenna mast in front of the School of Public Relations and Communications (later College of Communications) – started growing in the spring of 1964, Case persuaded university trustees that the university should take over the widely-heard radio station (now a major outlet for National Public Radio and still a BU-owned broadcast facility). The trustees approved the firing of student managers and clamped down on programming and editorial policy, which had been led by Jim Thistle, later a major force in Boston's broadcast news milieu. The on-campus political dispute between Case's conservative administration and the suddenly active and mostly liberal student body led to other disputes over BU student print publications, such as the B.U. News and the Scarlet, a fraternity association newspaper.

The presidency of John Silber also saw much expansion of the campus and programs. In the late 1970s, the Lahey Clinic vacated its building at 605 Commonwealth Avenue and moved to Burlington, Massachusetts. The vacated building was purchased by BU to house the School of Education. After arriving from the University of Texas in 1971, Silber set out to remake the university into a global center for research by recruiting star faculty. Two of his faculty "stars", Elie Wiesel and Derek Walcott, won Nobel Prizes shortly after Silber recruited them. Two others, Saul Bellow and Sheldon Glashow won Nobel Prizes before Silber recruited them.

In addition to recruiting new scholars, Silber expanded the physical campus, constructing the Photonics Center for the study of light, a new building for the School of Management, and the Life Science and Engineering Building for interdisciplinary research, among other projects. Campus expansion continued in the 2000s with the construction of new dormitories and the Agganis Arena.

=== Student and faculty activism ===
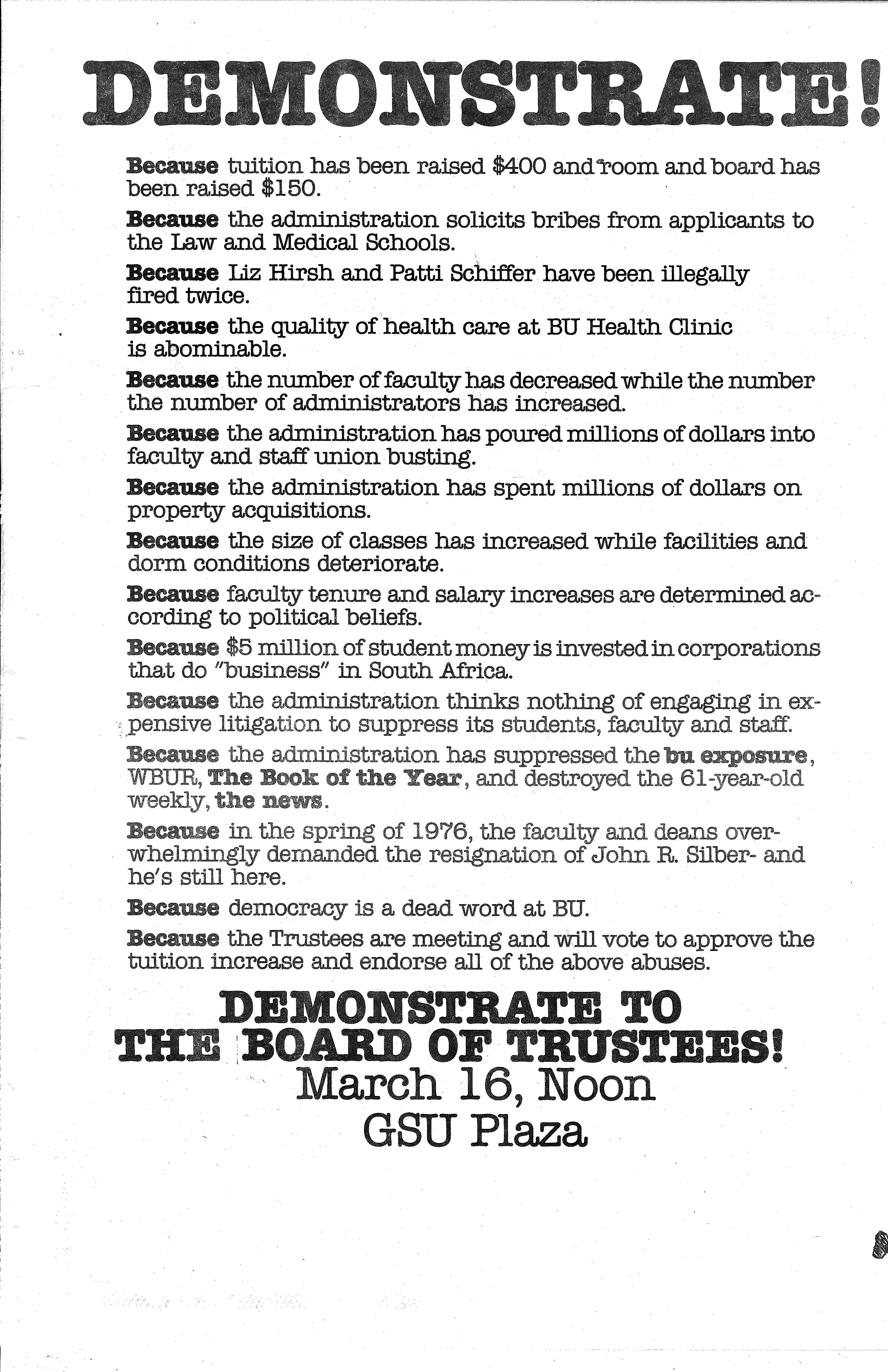
BU Exposure in March 1978

To protest the poor condition of Boston University's African-American curriculum, on April 25, 1968 (three weeks after the assassination of Martin Luther King Jr.), African-American students conducted a sit-in and locked BU president Arland F. Christ-Janer out of his office for 12 hours. Umoja, BU's Black Student Union, put forward ten demands to Christ-Janer and got nine of them approved that included the creation of a Martin Luther King Chair of Social Ethics, expansion of African-American library resources and tutoring services, opening an "Afro-American coordinating center," admission and selection of more Black students and faculty. No disciplinary action was taken against the students who only opened the chains after their demands were met. "There was no surprise, or feeling of victory on the students' parts," said Christ-Janer in response to the sit-in. "They had confidence in their demands, and I had a confidence in them. The university, black and white alike, was the winner." The late twentieth century saw a culmination in student activism at Boston University during the presidency of John R. Silber.

In 1972, student protests rose against the university administration's endorsement of Marine Corps recruitment on campus which faced significant opposition from Students for a Democratic Society.

On March 27, 1972, 50 police officers in "riot gear" defused a demonstration of 150 protesters at 195 Bay State Road, the BU Placement Office, where Marine recruiters were holding student interviews. A few protesters were arrested while some sustained minor injuries, including a student and two officers. Contrary to student claims of a peaceful protest, Silber said, "Civilization doesn't abdicate in face of barbarism. Those students or nonstudents who deliberately seek violent confrontation and refuse all efforts at peaceful resolution of issues must expect society to use its police power in its own defense." In response to Silber's decision of a forceful police intervention, the Faculty State conducted a vote on Silber's resignation which could not pass due to a "vote of 140–25 with 32 abstentions." As a result of this failed motion, Peter P. Gabriel resigned his position as the dean of Boston University's School of Management in protest of Silber's presidency and his "counterproductive" leadership. Silber's support of military recruitment on campus, which he pushed to make the university eligible for federal grants, caused other demonstrations. On December 5, 1972, fifteen BU Student Government officers started a three-day hunger strike at Marsh Chapel demanding Silber "to file a lawsuit against the Federal government challenging the constitutionality of the Herbert Amendment."

On March 16, 1978, about 900 Boston University students gathered at the George Sherman Union to protest against the $400 rise in tuition and $150 rise in housing charges declared by the trustees on March 7. The protest interrupted a board of trustees conference. While John Silber and Arthur G. B. Metcalf, chairman of the board of trustees, were negotiating with student government representatives to discuss the matter further on a separate occasion, the protesters marched into the building from two entrances, effectively trapping 40 trustees and 10 university administrators in the building for over thirty minutes. Twenty officers from the Boston University Police Department had to disperse the crowd from the stairwells. The protest resulted in the arrest of 19 year old Joshua Grossman, while another student and two BUPD officers were taken to hospitals.

On April 5, 1979, several hundred faculty members, as well as clerical workers and librarians, went on strike. The faculty members were seeking a labor contract while the clerical workers and librarians were seeking union recognition. The strike ended by mid-April under terms favorable to the employees.

On November 27, 1979, the committee to Defend Iranian Students—composed of Iranian students, Youths Against Foreign Fascism and the Revolutionary Communist Party—held a demonstration at the George Sherman Union against the deposed Shah of Iran and the deportation of Iranian students from the US. "To the Iranian people, that man (the shah) is Adolf Hitler," students protested. "The Shah Must Face the Wrath of the People." This was met with chants of "God Bless America" from the opposing group. Twenty policemen broke up the confronting parties though no arrests were made.

=== 21st century ===
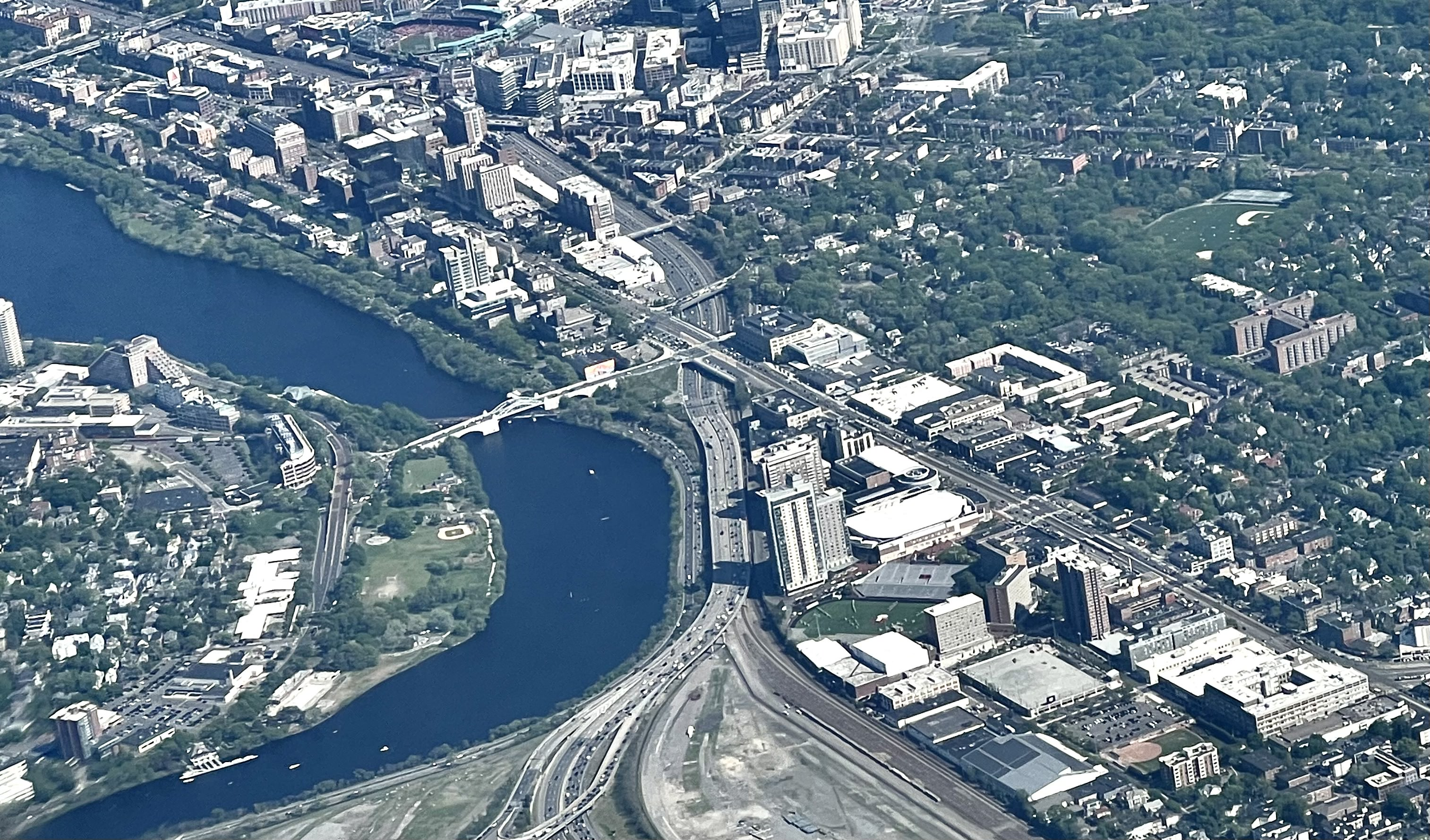
An aerial view of the campus in May 2023

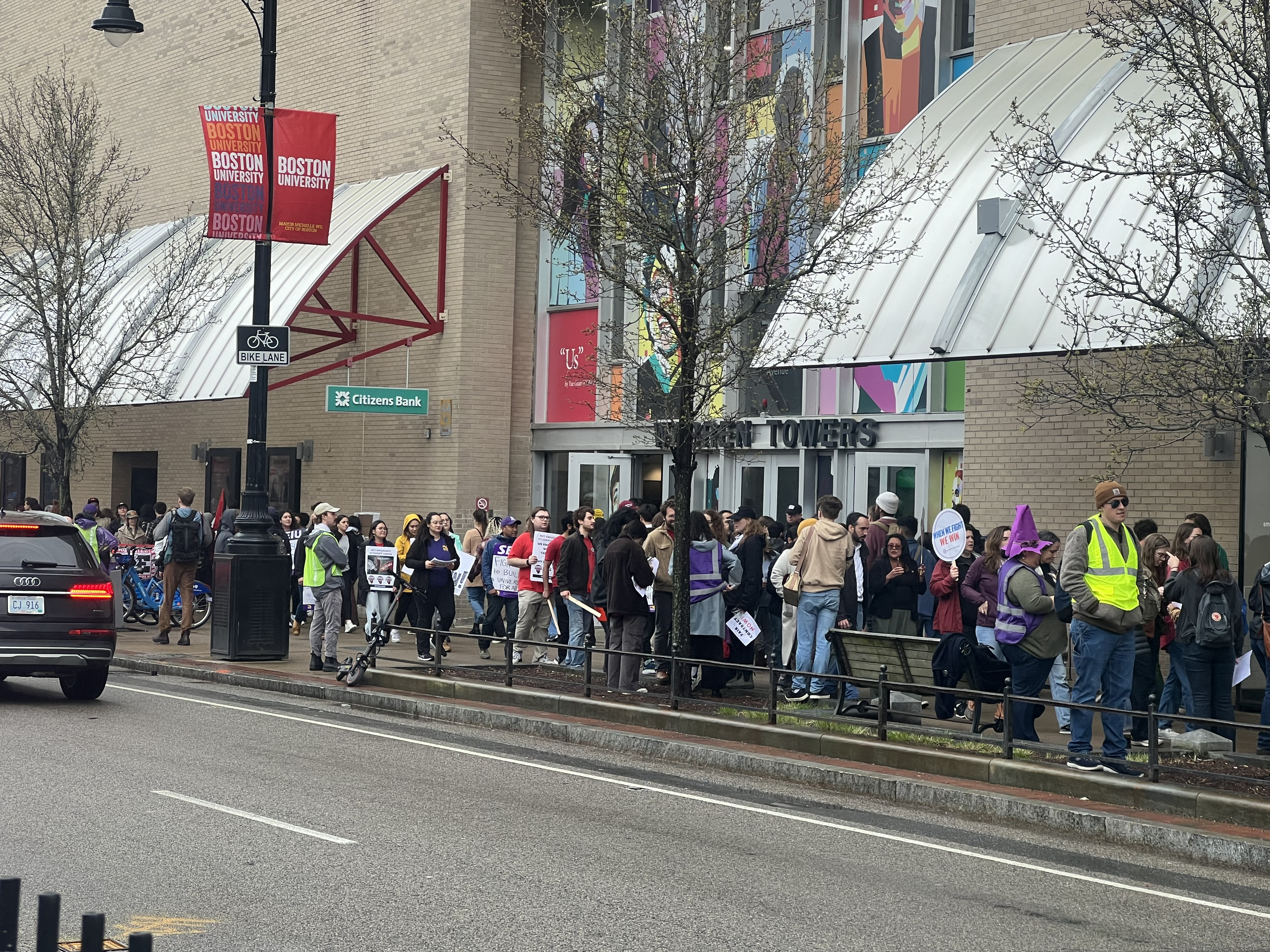
Resident life and graduate workers at the university on strike for better protections and pay in April 2024

Following the trustees' push for the resignation of the university's eighth president, Jon Westling, they voted unanimously to offer the presidency of the university to Daniel S. Goldin, former administrator of NASA under presidents George H. W. Bush, Bill Clinton, and George W. Bush. Goldin was set to take over the job on November 1, 2003, and be officially inaugurated on November 17, though the deal collapsed in the week leading up to his arrival in Boston.

The university eventually terminated Goldin's contract at a cost of $1.8 million and initiated a second search to fill the presidential position, culminating with the inauguration of Robert A. Brown as the university's 10th president on April 27, 2006. (Aram Chobanian, who had served as president ad interim during most of the second search, was formally recognized as the 9th president in 2005.) In the wake of this fiasco, several actions were taken to improve the image projected to potential presidential candidates as well as the functioning of the board itself.

In 2012, the university was invited to join the Association of American Universities, comprising 66 leading research universities in the United States and Canada. BU, one of four universities at the time invited to join the group since 2000, became the 62nd member. In the Boston area, Harvard, MIT, Tufts, and Brandeis are also members.

That same year, a $1 billion fundraising campaign was launched, its first comprehensive campaign, emphasizing financial aid, faculty support, research, and facility improvements. In 2016, the campaign goal was reached. The board of trustees voted to raise the goal to $1.5 billion and extend through 2019. The campaign has funded 74 new faculty positions, including 49 named full professorships and 25 Career Development Professorships. The campaign concluded in September 2019, raising a total of $1.85 billion over seven years.

In February 2015, the faculty adopted an open-access policy to make its scholarship publicly accessible online. The Charles River and Medical Campuses have undergone physical transformations since 2006, from new buildings and playing fields to dormitory renovations. The campus has seen the addition of a 26-floor student residence at 33 Harry Agganis Way, nicknamed StuVi2, the New Balance Playing Field, the Yawkey Center for Student Services, the Alan and Sherry Leventhal Center, the Law tower and Redstone annex, the Engineering Product Innovation Center (EPIC), the Rajen Kilachand Center for Integrated Life Sciences & Engineering, and the Joan and Edgar Booth Theatre, which opened in fall 2017.

The construction of the Rajen Kilachand Center for Integrated Life Sciences & Engineering was funded by part of BU's largest ever gift, a $115 million donation from Rajen Kilachand. The Dahod Family Alumni Center in the renovated BU Castle began in May 2017 and was completed in fall 2018. Development of the university's existing housing stock has included significant renovations to BU's oldest dorm, 610 Beacon Street (formerly Myles Standish Hall) and Annex, and to Kilachand Hall, formerly known as Shelton Hall, and a brand new student residence on the Medical Campus. In May 2024, Boston University removed Myles Standish's name from the building. It is now referred to by its address, 610 Beacon Street.

In 2019, Boston University expanded its financial aid program so that it would "meet the full need for all domestic students who qualify for financial aid," starting in fall 2020.

In September 2022, Robert A. Brown announced he will step down at the end of the 2022–2023 academic year. Brown began his presidency in September 2005, and his contract was set to run through 2025. Although Brown chose to end his presidency, he will resume teaching at the university. On August 1, 2023, Kenneth W. Freeman started serving as president ad interim. In October 2023, Melissa Gilliam was named the incoming president, starting her term on July 1, 2024.

On July 1, 2024, Melissa Gilliam began her tenure as the university's 11th president. On October 16, 2024, the 2024 Boston University strikes ended.

On July 1, 2026, the scientist Colin Duckett began his role as university provost and chief academic officer.

==== Response to the COVID-19 pandemic ====
The university closed down due to the COVID-19 and shifted to online learning for the remainder of the semester on March 11, 2020. For the fall 2020 semester, BU offered a hybrid system that allows for students to decide whether to take a remote class or participate in-person. Larger classes would be broken down into smaller groups that rotate between online and in-person sessions. The school started administering its own COVID-19 testing for faculty, staff, and students on July 27, 2020. The new BU Clinical Testing Laboratory has accelerated testing that can give results to students, staff, and faculty by the next day. The lab uses eight robots to process up to 6,000 tests per day. A contact tracing team is part of the process to contain infections on campus. BU also started a new website "Back2BU" to provide students with the latest information on reopening. The results of the tests were published on BU's public COVID-19 Testing Data Dashboard.

BU's National Emerging Infectious Diseases Laboratories (NEIDL) has been working with live coronavirus samples since March 2020, and—at the time—was the only New England lab to have live samples.

In August 2020, BU filed a service mark application with the United States Patent and Trademark Office to secure the phrase "F*ck It Won't Cut It" for a student-led COVID-19 safety program on campus. The slogan is meant to promote "safe and smart actions and behaviors for college and university students in a COVID-19 environment", according to the application.

In July 2021, BU announced faculty and staff will be required to be vaccinated against COVID-19 for the fall 2022 semester. This comes after a vaccine requirement for all students, which was announced in April.

==== COVID-19 research and gain-of-function controversy ====
In October 2022, Boston University's National Emerging Infectious Diseases Laboratories conducted research in a Biosafety Level 3 lab that modified the original strain of the virus that causes COVID-19 with the spike proteins of the Omicron variant. This resulted in a virus that was more lethal to lab mice than the Omicron variant itself, but less lethal than the original strain. Some medical authorities criticized the research as dangerous "gain of function" research, but others argued that it did not technically count as gain of function research because the modified virus happened not to be quite as lethal as the original strain. Marc Lipsitch of Harvard, however, argued "these are unquestionably gain-of-function experiments. As many have noted, this is a very broad term encompassing many harmless and some potentially dangerous experiments. GOF is a scientific technique, not an epithet." While the BU researchers gained internal research and Boston government approvals for the research, they failed to notify the US Government's National Institute of Allergy and Infectious Diseases that was a funder of the lab.

== Campus ==
=== Boston campuses and facilities ===
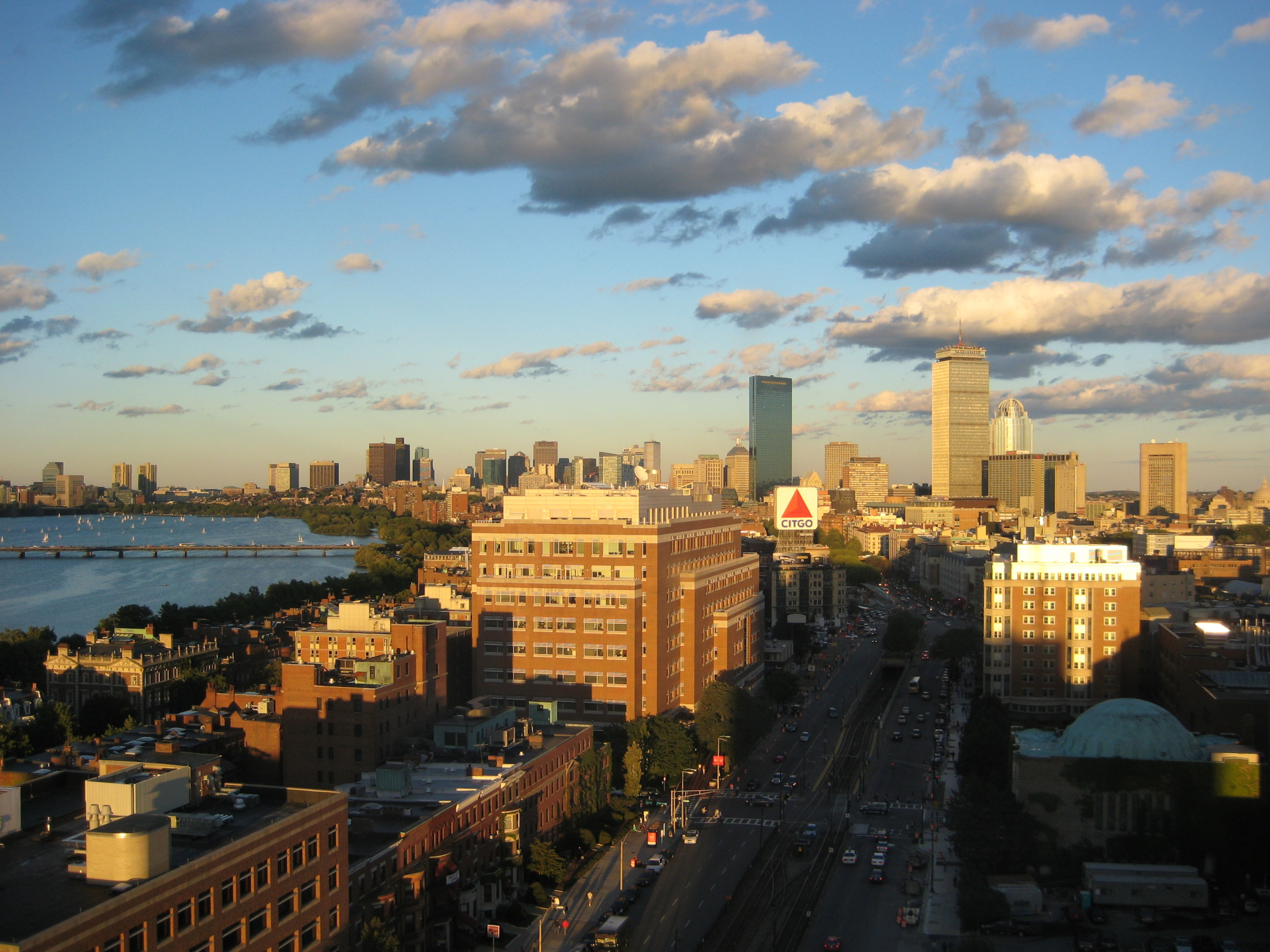
Boston University's East Campus along Commonwealth Avenue

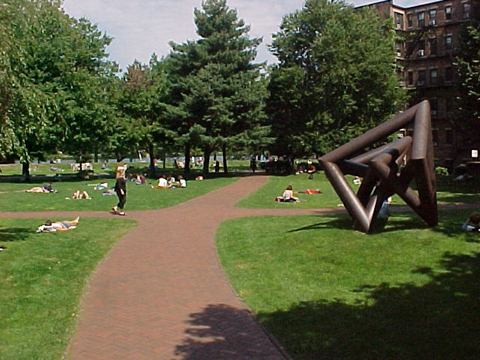
The "BU Beach", a linear strip of land sandwiched between the main BU campus and busy Storrow Drive, used as an outdoors space to relax and sunbathe in good weather

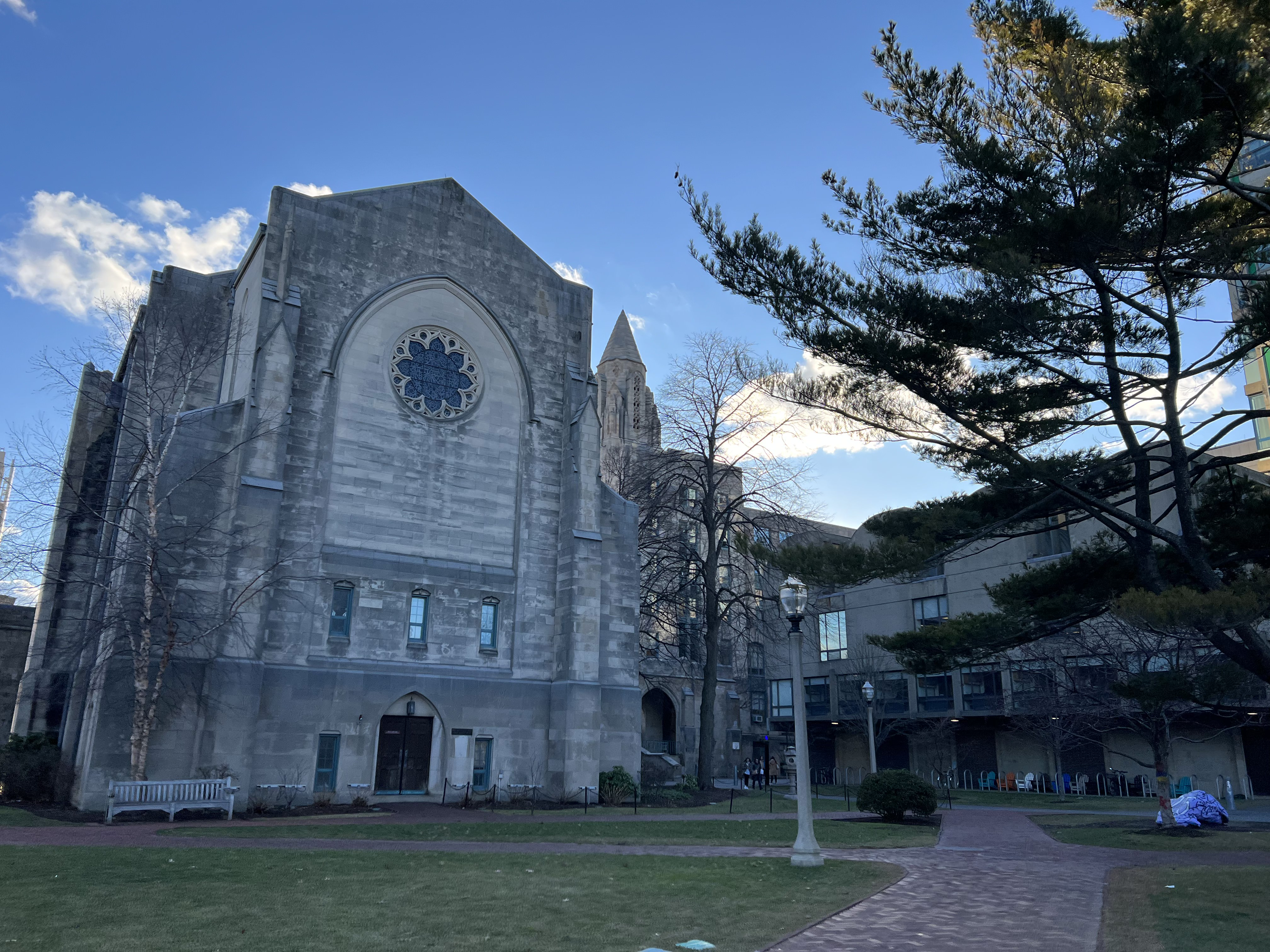
Marsh Chapel, located at BU Beach, next to the BU Law Auditorium

The university's main Charles River Campus follows Commonwealth Avenue and the Green Line, beginning near Kenmore Square and continuing for over a mile and a half to its end near the border of Boston's Allston neighborhood. The Boston University Bridge over the Charles River into Cambridge represents the dividing line between Main Campus, where most schools and classroom buildings are concentrated, and West Campus, home to several athletic facilities and playing fields, the large West Campus dorm, and the new John Hancock Student Village complex. Boston University also has a campus located in the Fenway area, housing undergraduate students.

The main campus buildings of BU are separated from the Charles River Esplanade parkland and the Paul Dudley White Bike Path along the banks of the nearby Charles River, by heavily trafficked Storrow Drive, a high-speed limited-access major roadway connecting downtown Boston to its western suburbs. The separation occurred in the late 1920s, when the Commonwealth of Massachusetts seized land by eminent domain for the construction of the new roadway along the riverbank.

A narrow strip of grassy lawn between BU academic buildings lining Commonwealth Avenue and the torrent of traffic on Storrow Drive has been humorously dubbed "BU Beach", because it is a favorite hangout for sunbathing in good weather. The lounging students are protected from traffic incursions by a raised earthen berm, which also muffles the traffic noise to a dull roar. To protect pedestrians from vehicular collisions, Storrow Drive is enclosed by fencing, with pedestrian bridges allowing safe crossings at Silber Way and at Marsh Chapel. An additional crossing is possible at the BU Bridge, which also allows street traffic to cross from the Boston side to the Cambridge side of the Charles River.

As a result of its continual expansion, the Charles River campus contains an array of architecturally diverse buildings. The College of Arts and Sciences, Marsh Chapel, and the School of Theology buildings are the university's most recognizable, and were built in the late-1930s and 1940s in collegiate gothic style. A sizable amount of the campus is traditional Boston brownstone, especially at Bay State Road and South Campus, where BU has acquired almost every townhouse those areas offer. The buildings are primarily dormitories, but many also serve as various institutes as well as department offices.

From the 1960s through the 1980s, several contemporary buildings were constructed, including the Mugar Library, BU Law School, and Warren Towers, all of which were built in the brutalist style of architecture. The Metcalf Science Center for Science and Engineering, constructed in 1983, might more accurately be described as Structural Expressionism. Morse Auditorium, adjacent, stands in stark architectural contrast, as it was originally constructed as a Jewish synagogue. The most recent architectural additions to BU's campus are the Duan Family Center for Computing & Data Sciences, Photonics Center, Life Science and Engineering Building, The Student Village (which includes the FitRec Center and Agganis Arena), and the Questrom School of Business. All these buildings were built in brick, a few with a substantial amount of brownstone.

Boston University converted the old Nickelodeon Cinemas complex into College of Engineering labs and offices. In 2016, the university sold the building that housed the Huntington Theatre Company and constructed the Joan & Edgar Booth Theatre and College of Fine Arts Production Center to consolidate the theater program on campus.

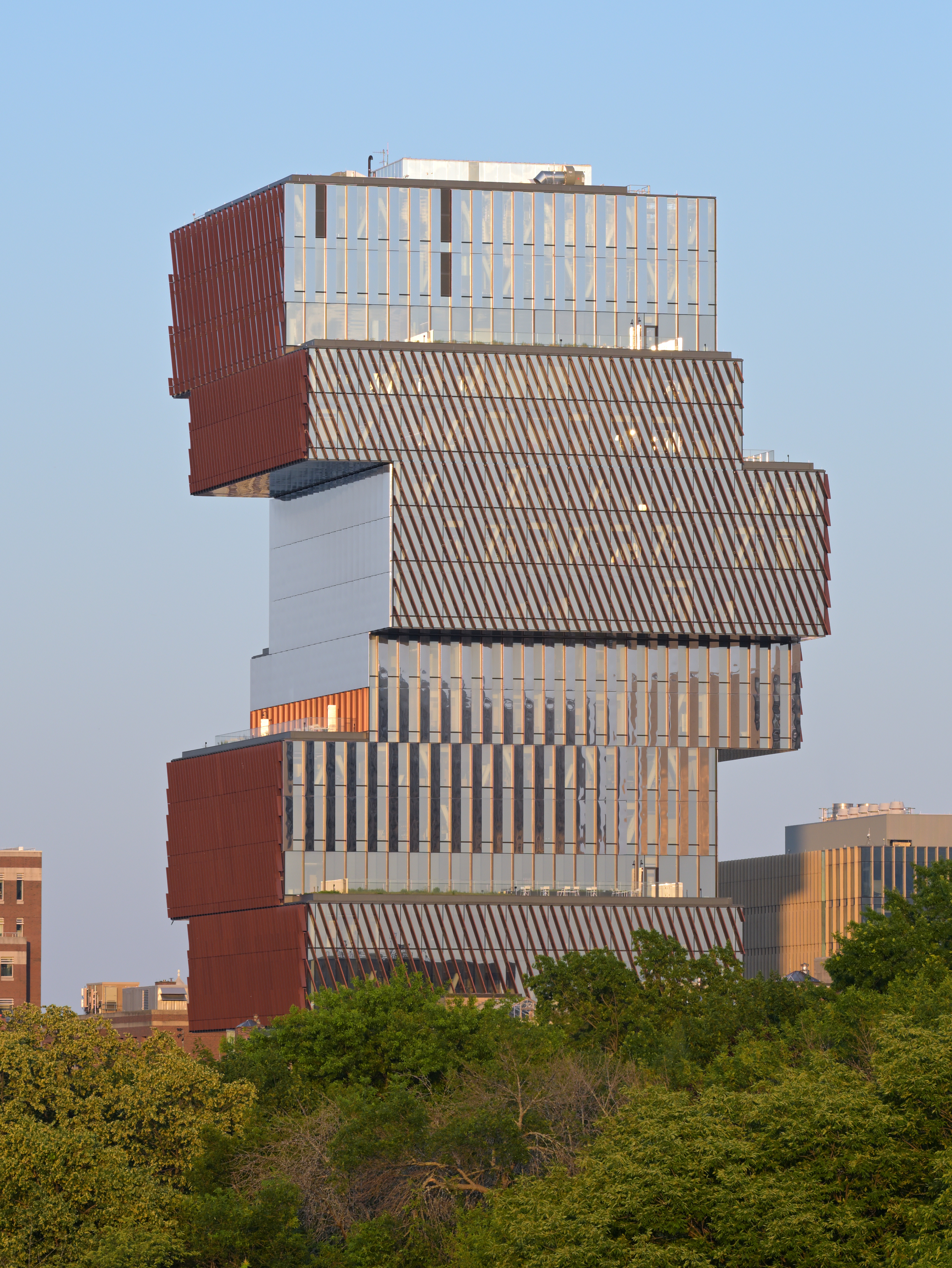
The Center for Computing & Data Sciences

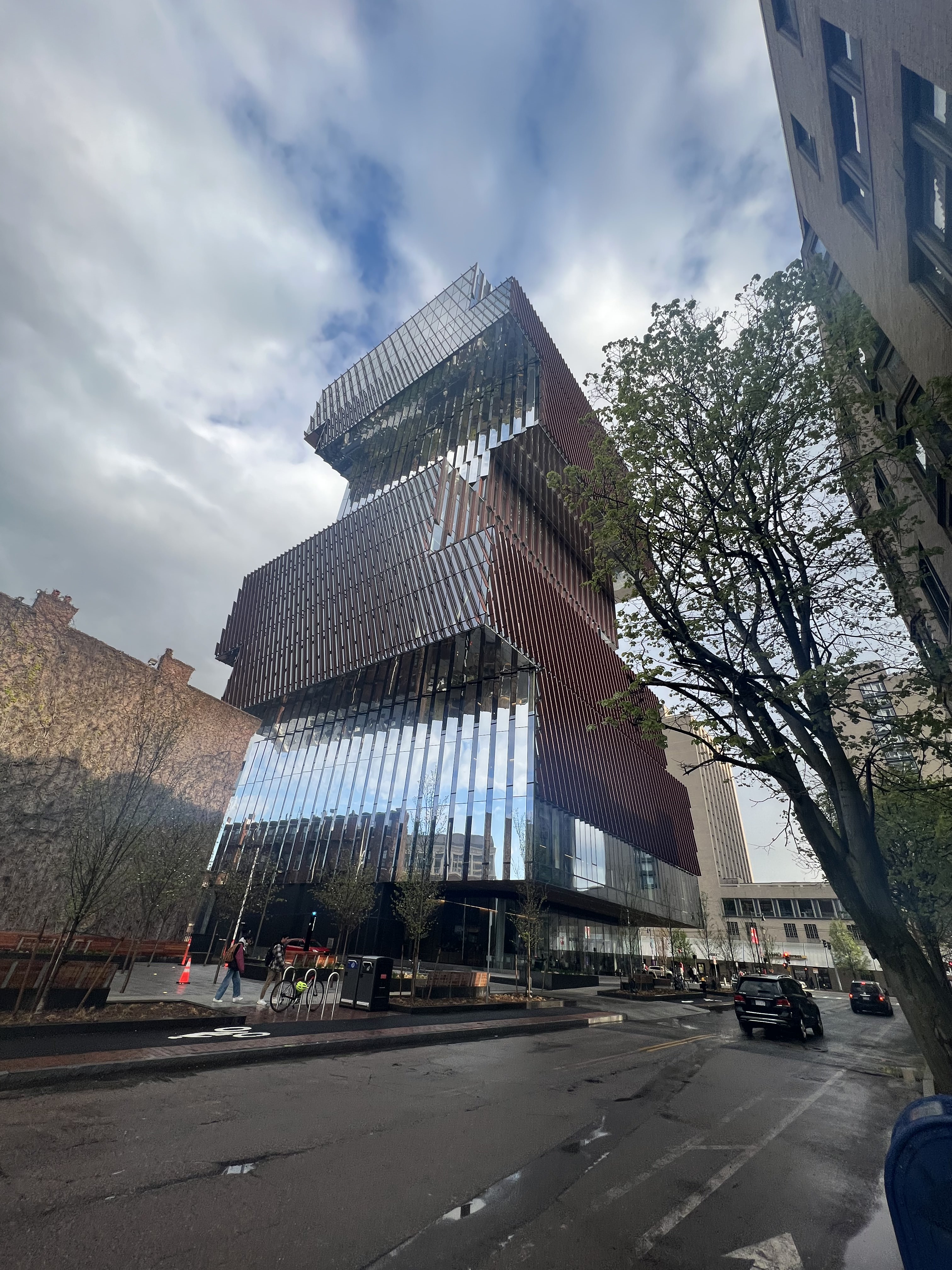
Viewed from Granby St.

BU has earned several historic preservation awards with recent extensive building renovation projects, such as the School of Law tower, the Alan & Sherry Leventhal Center, 610 Beacon Street (formerly Myles Standish Hall), and the Dahod Family Alumni Center (formerly The Castle). Construction of the brick and glass Yawkey Center for Student Services was designed to follow the requirements of the Bay State Road historic district. Use of glass and steel for new construction on Commonwealth Avenue includes the Rajen Kilachand Center for Integrated Life Sciences & Engineering, which opened in 2017.

In 2018, following negotiations in the preceding year, Boston University purchased the former Wheelock College, which is now referred to as the Boston University Fenway Campus (although it is actually located in the adjacent neighborhood of Longwood).

As of 2019, BU has sold or leased to real estate developers several building sites it owned in Kenmore Square next to its campus. Large multistory buildings are being constructed there, which will transform the long-time appearance of the busy traffic hub.

In September 2021, BU completed a $115 million project to renovate and expand the Henry M. Goldman School of Dental Medicine. The project expanded clinical spaces, added a simulation learning center, and improved collaborative spaces for students.

The 19-story Center for Computing and Data Sciences ceremonial opening on December 8, 2022 was covered by publications including Bloomberg, The Boston Globe, and CBS News which praised the building for being the largest carbon-neutral building in Boston and noted its unusual design. A ribbon cutting ceremony was performed by Boston Mayor Michelle Wu, President Robert A. Brown, the associate provost for computing and data sciences Azer Bestavros, dean of Arts & Sciences Stan Sclaroff, BU Board of Trustees chair Ahmass Fakahany, BU provost Jean Morrison, and Boston city councilor Kenzie Bok.

==== Student housing ====
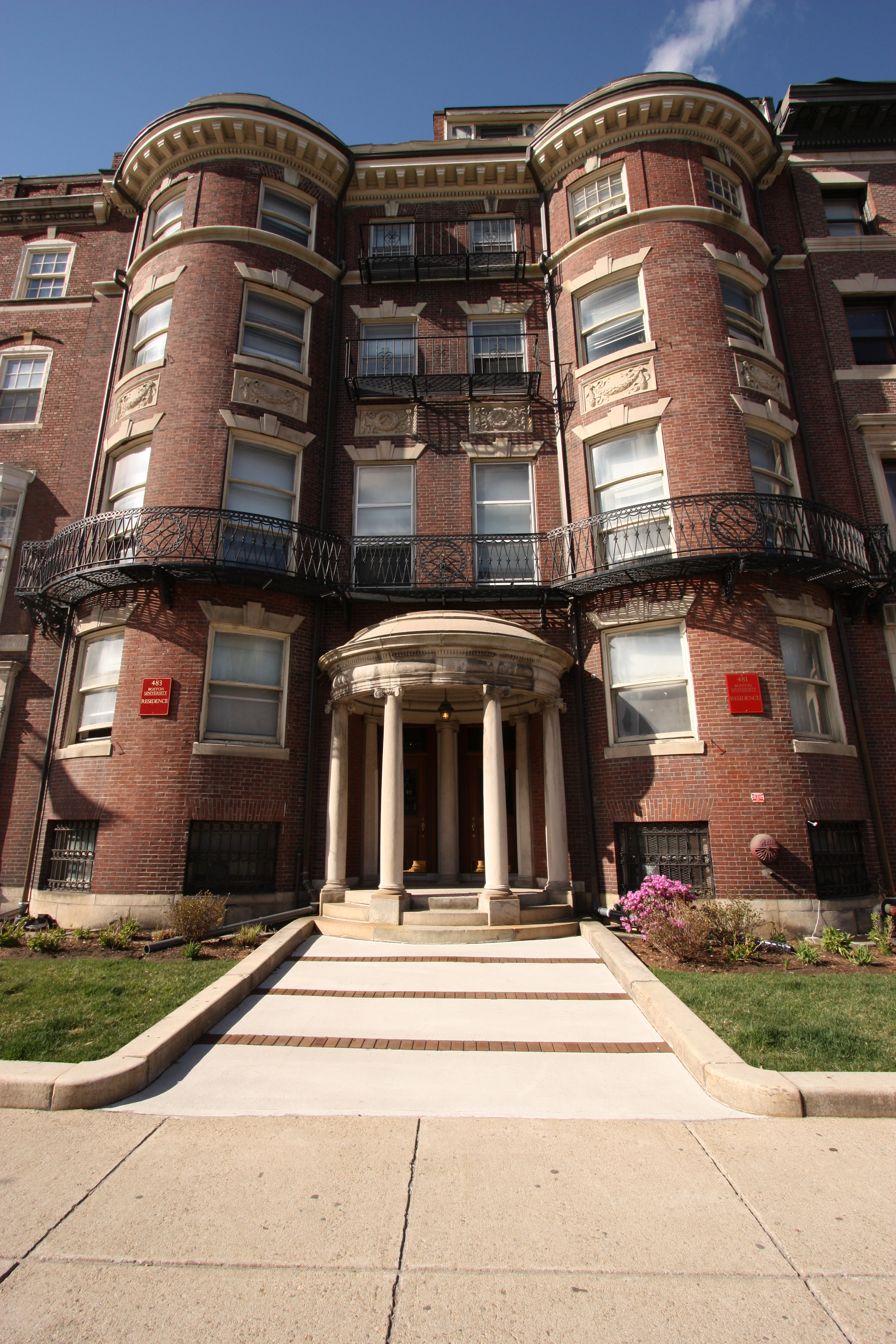
A brownstone townhouse used by Boston University as dormitory

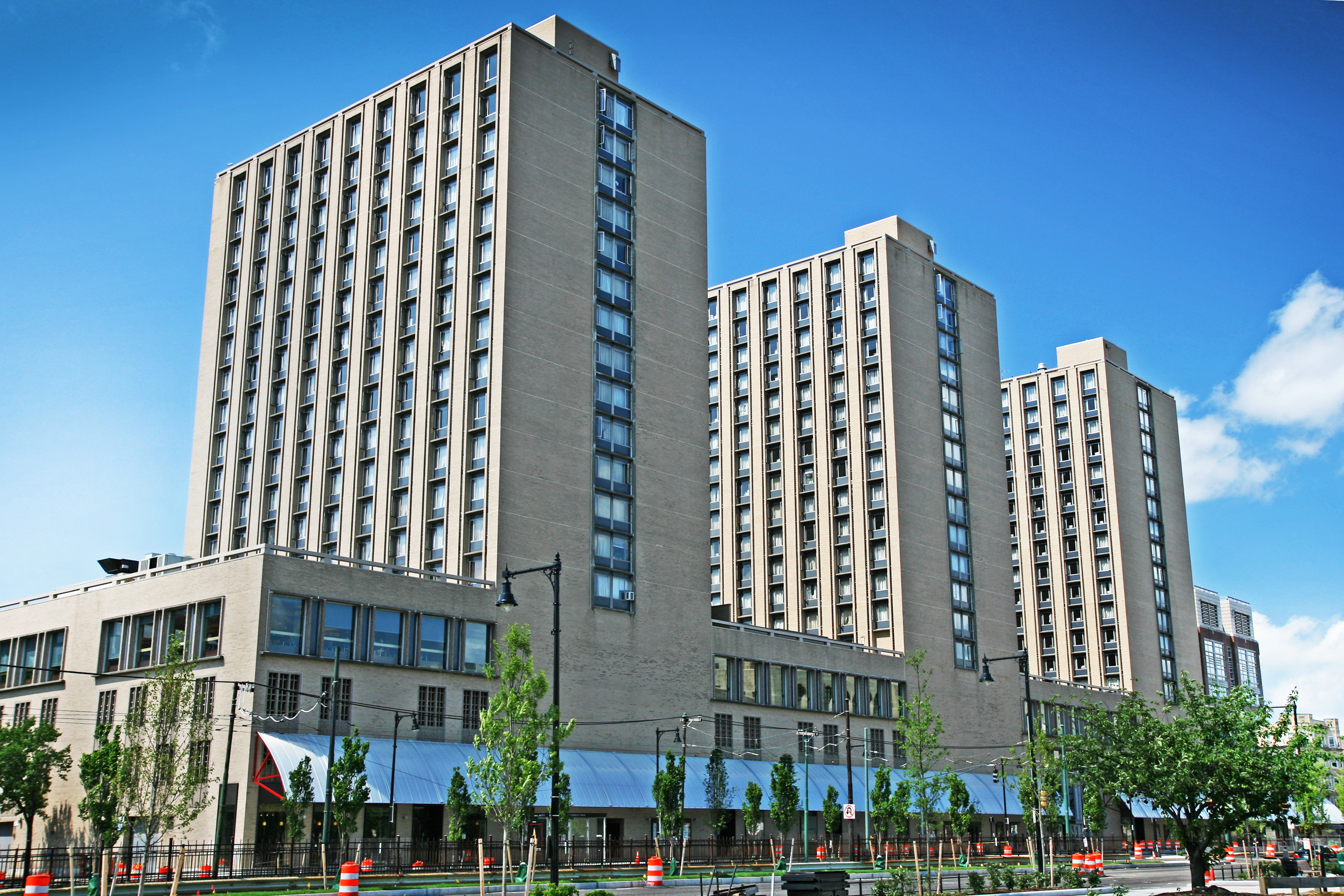
Warren Towers, the second largest non-military dorm in the country.

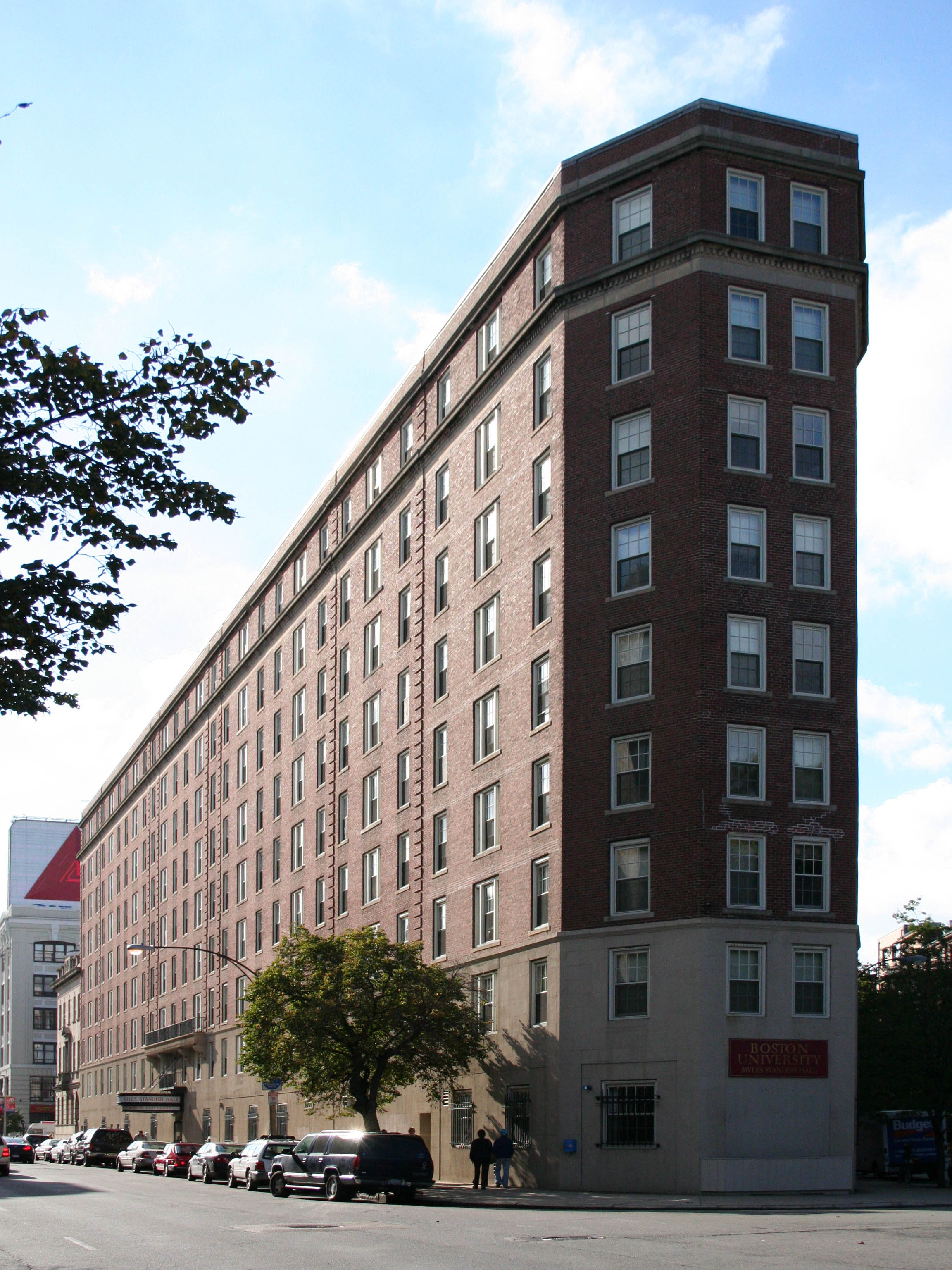
Built in 1925 as the Myles Standish Hotel, this building was converted to dorm space in 1949. In May 2024, the Myles Standish name was removed from the dorm, and it is now called 610 Beacon Street.

Boston University's housing system is the nation's 10th largest among four-year colleges. BU was originally a commuter school, but the university now guarantees the option of on-campus housing for four years for all undergraduate students. In 2006, 76 percent of the undergraduate population lived on campus. Boston University requires that all students living in dormitories be enrolled in a year-long meal plan, with several combinations of meals and dining points which can be used as cash in on-campus facilities.

Housing at BU is varied, ranging from individual 19th-century brownstone townhouses and apartment buildings acquired by the school, to large-scale high-rises built in the 1960s and 2000s.

The large dormitories include the 1,800-student Warren Towers, the largest on campus, as well as West Campus and The Towers. The smaller dormitory and apartment style housing are mainly located in two parts of campus: Bay State Road and the South Campus residential area. Bay State Road is a tree-lined street that runs parallel to Commonwealth Avenue and is home to the majority of BU's townhouses, often called "brownstones". South Campus is a student residential area south of Commonwealth Avenue and separated from the main campus by the Massachusetts Turnpike. Some of the larger buildings in that area have been converted into dormitories, while the rest of the South Campus buildings are apartments.

Boston University's newest residence and principal apartment-style housing area is officially called 33 Harry Agganis Way, "StuVi2" unofficially, and is part of The John Hancock Student Village project. The north-facing, 26-story building is apartment style while the south-facing, 19-story building is in an 8-bedroom dormitory-style suite pattern. In total, the building houses 960 residents.

Aside from these main residential areas, smaller residential dormitories are scattered along Commonwealth Avenue.

Boston University also provides specialty houses or specialty floors to students who have particular interests.

Kilachand Hall, formerly Shelton Hall, is rumored to be haunted by the ghost of playwright Eugene O'Neill. O'Neill lived in what was originally room 401 (now 419) while the building was a residential hotel. He died in a hospital on November 27, 1953, and his ghost is rumored to haunt both the room and the floor. The fourth floor is now a specialty floor called the Writers' Corridor.

==== John Hancock Student Village ====
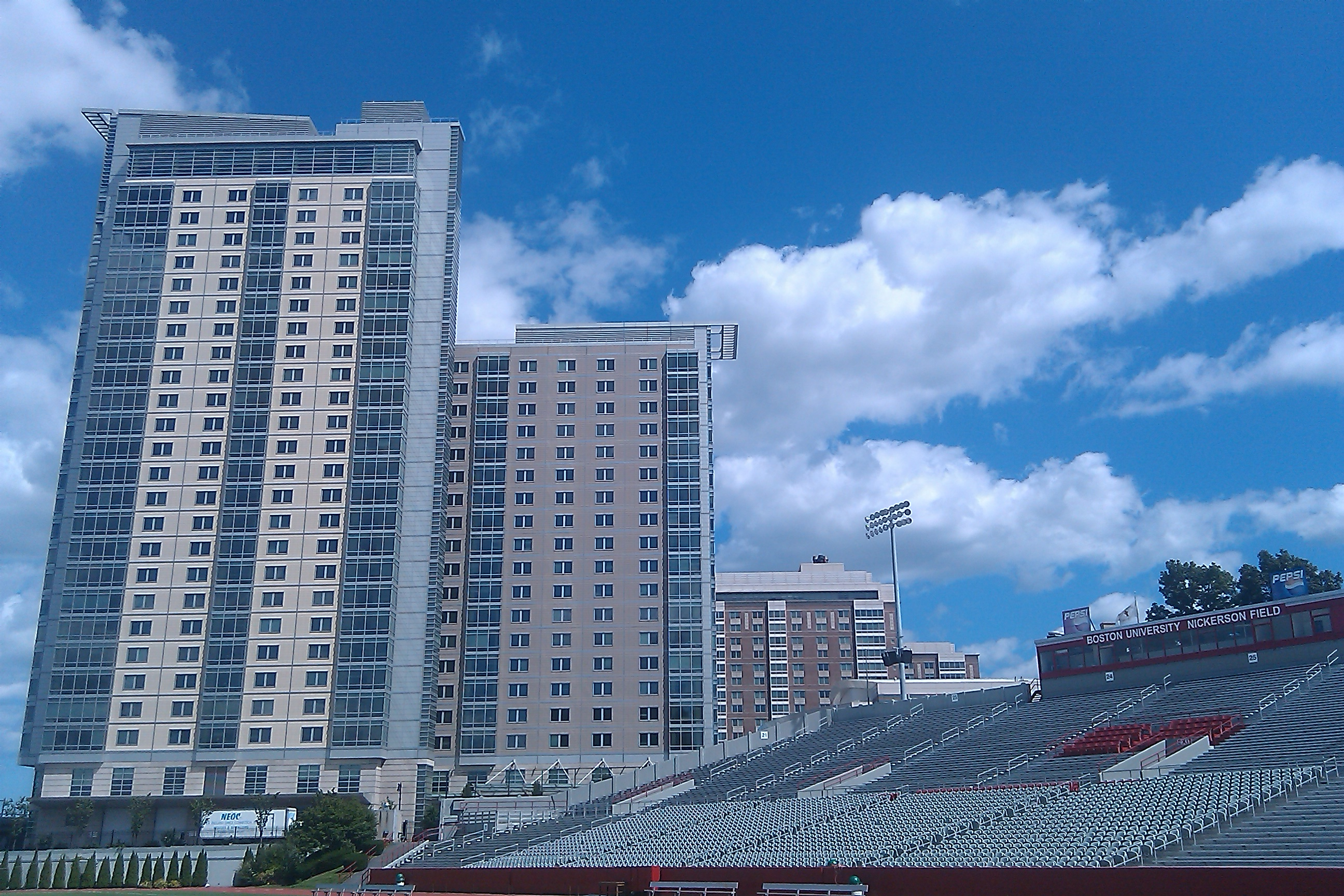
Student Village II with Student Village I in the background, viewed from Nickerson Field

The Student Village is a large new residential and recreational complex covering 10 acres (40,000 m^{2}) between Buick Street and Nickerson Field, ground formerly occupied by a National Guard Armory, which had been used by the university for indoor track and field and as a storage facility before its demolition and the start of construction. The dormitory of apartment suites at 10 Buick Street (often abbreviated to "StuVi" by students) opened to juniors and seniors in the fall of 2000. In 2002, John Hancock Insurance announced its sponsorship of the multimillion-dollar project.

The Agganis Arena, named after Harry Agganis, was opened to concerts and hockey games in January 2005. The Agganis Arena is capable of housing 6,224 spectators for Terrier hockey games, replacing the smaller Walter Brown Arena. It can also be used for concerts and shows. In March 2005, the final element of phase II of the Student Village complex, the Fitness and Recreation (FitRec) Center, was opened, drawing large crowds from the student body. Construction on the rest of phase II, which included 19- and 26-story residential towers was finished in fall 2009.

==== Other facilities ====
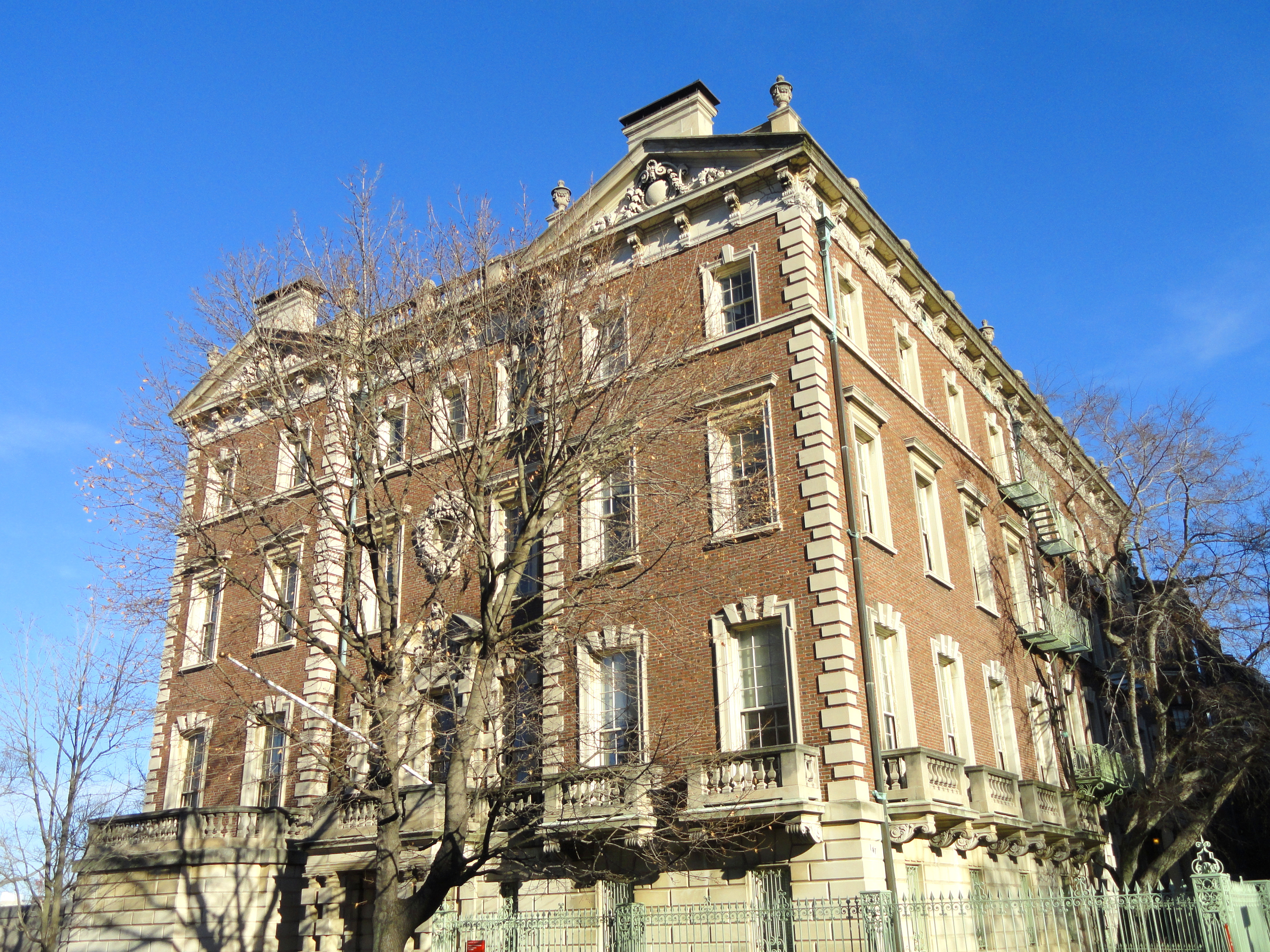
The Elie Wiesel Center for Judaic Studies on Bay State Road

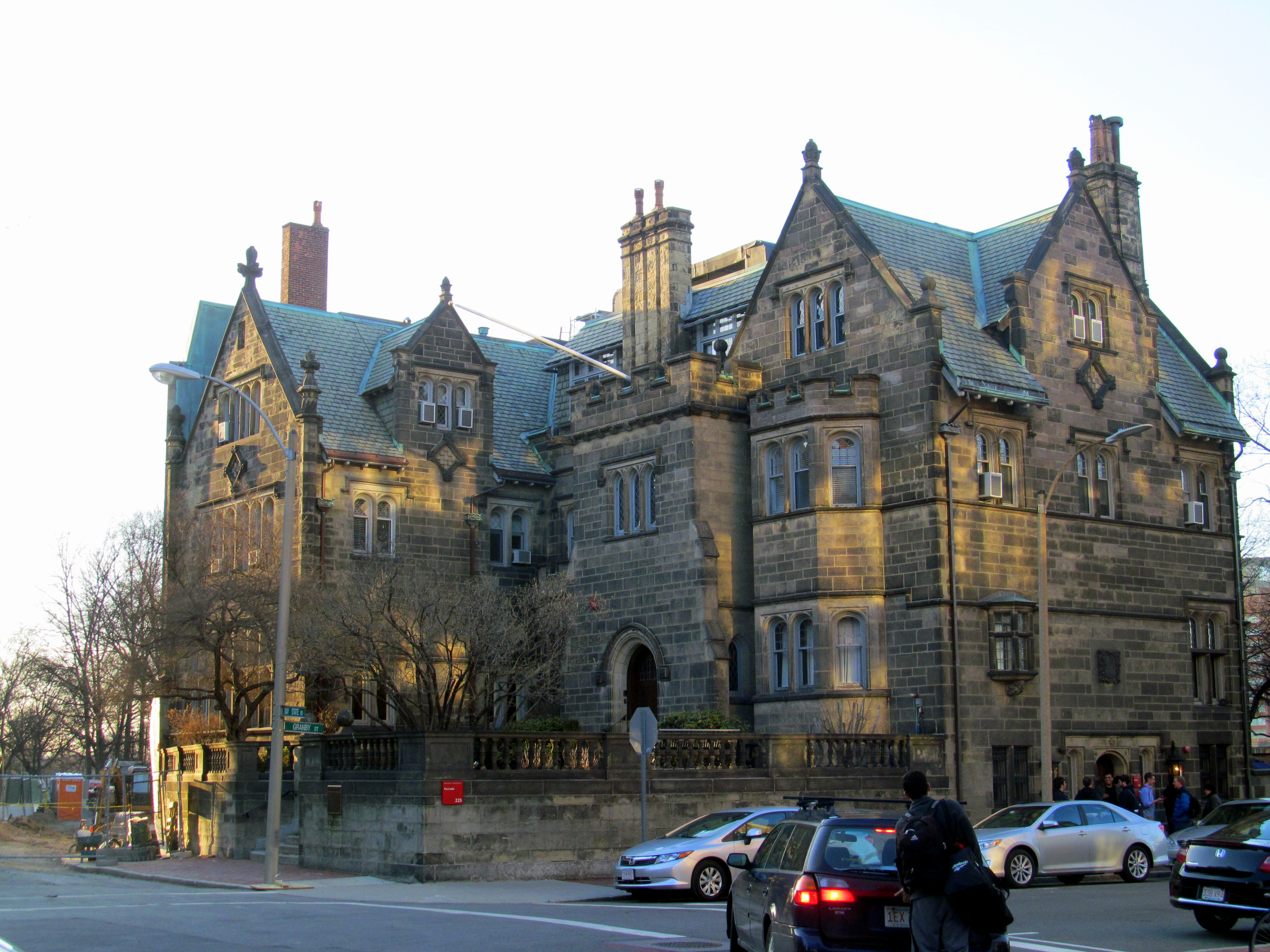
BU Castle, built in 1915, on Bay State Road

The Mugar Memorial Library is the central academic library for the Charles River Campus. It also houses the Howard Gotlieb Archival Research Center, formerly called the Twentieth Century Archive, where documents belonging to thousands of eminent figures in literature, journalism, diplomacy, the arts, and other fields are housed.

The George Sherman Union (GSU), located next to Mugar Memorial Library, provides students with a food court featuring many fast-food chains, including Panda Express, Basho, Starbucks, El Comal, Rhett's, The Coop, Halal Shack, and Urban Table. The GSU also provides lounge areas for students to relax or study. The basement of the George Sherman Union is home to the BU Central lounge, which hosts concerts and other activities and events.

BU Castle, located on the West end of Bay State Road, is one of the older buildings on campus. The building was commissioned by William Lindsay for his own use in 1905, long before his daughter's honeymoon on the ill-fated Lusitania. In 1939, the university acquired the property by agreement with the city to repay all back taxes owed; these funds were raised through donations from, among others, William Chenery, a University Trustee. It served as the residence of the university president until 1967, when President Christ-Janer found it too large for his needs as a residence and turned it to other uses. It is now a conference space. Underneath the Castle is the BU Pub, the only BU-operated drinking establishment on campus.

The Florence and Chafetz Hillel House on Bay State Road is the Hillel House for the university. With four floors and a basement, the facility includes lounges, study rooms and a kosher dining hall, open during the academic year (including Passover) to students and walk-ins from the community. The first floor also includes the Granby St. Cafe as well as TVs and ping-pong, pool and foosball tables. The Hillel serves as a focal point for BU's large and active Jewish community. It hosts approximately 30 student groups, including social, cultural, and religious groups, and BU Students for Israel (BUSI), Holocaust Education, and the Center for Jewish Learning and Experience. It hosts a plethora of programs and speakers as well as Shabbat services and meals.

==== Cultural life ====
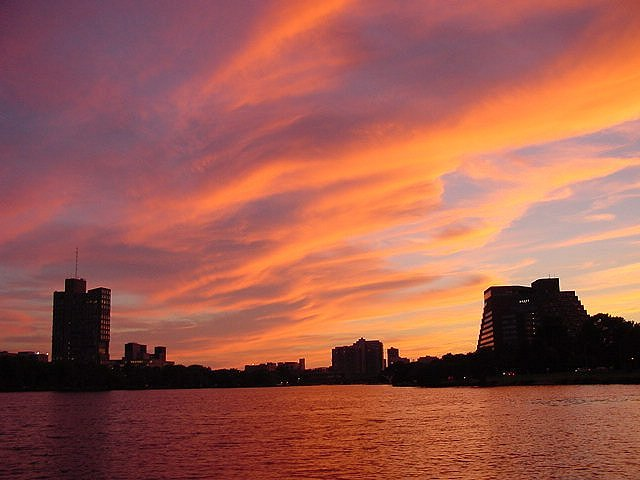
The Charles River and the university

The university is located at the junction of Fenway-Kenmore, Allston, and Brookline. In the Fenway-Kenmore area are the Museum of Fine Arts, the Isabella Stewart Gardner Museum, and the nightlife of Landsdowne Street as well as Fenway Park, home of the Boston Red Sox. Allston has been Boston's largest bohemian neighborhood since the 1960s. Nicknamed "Allston Rock City", the neighborhood is home to many artists and musicians, as well as a variety of cafés, and many of Boston's small music halls.

Beyond the southern border of the campus in Brookline, Harvard Street offers independent and foreign films at Coolidge Corner Theatre, and author readings at the Brookline Booksmith. Other nearby cultural institutions include Symphony Hall, Jordan Hall, the main branch of the Boston Public Library in Copley Square, the art and commerce of fashionable Newbury Street, and across the Charles River, the museums, shops, and galleries in Harvard Square and elsewhere in Cambridge.

The university is home to the Boston Playwrights' Theatre. Previously associated with the Huntington Theatre Company on Huntington Avenue, but put the BU Theatre property up for sale in 2016, it cast a shadow over the future of the organization. BU replaced the old Huntington Theatre facilities with the new Joan and Edgar Booth Theatre, located next to the Fuller Building housing the College of Fine Arts.

BU hosts campus and non-campus musical performances in the Tsai Performance Center at 685 Commonwealth Avenue, and the CFA Concert Hall at 855 Commonwealth Avenue.

Visual art works by students and by visiting artists are displayed in rotating exhibitions in the university's three galleries: the BU Art Gallery (BUAG) at the Stone Gallery, the 808 Gallery, and the Sherman Gallery, located respectively at 855, 808, and 775 Commonwealth Avenue. In addition, BU had been associated with the Photographic Resource Center located at 832 Commonwealth Avenue, which mounts several exhibitions yearly, as well as special events for student and professional photographers. However, BU withdrew its support as of May 2017, and the Photographic Resource Center is now a resident partner with the College of Art and Design at Lesley University.

==== Guest and visitor policies ====
Prior to September 2007, Boston University had a restrictive visitor policy, which limited the ability of students from different dormitories to visit each other at night. This changed when a new policy approved by BU President Brown took effect. The new policy allows for students living on campus to swipe into any on-campus dormitory between the hours of 7 am and 2 am using their Terrier cards. Student residents can also sign in guests with photo identification at any time, day or night. Overnight visitors of the opposite sex are no longer required to seek a same-sex "co-host". However, during reading period and the week before final exams, no guests are permitted in the halls overnight, and are expected to be out of the hall by 2 am.

==== Mass transit ====
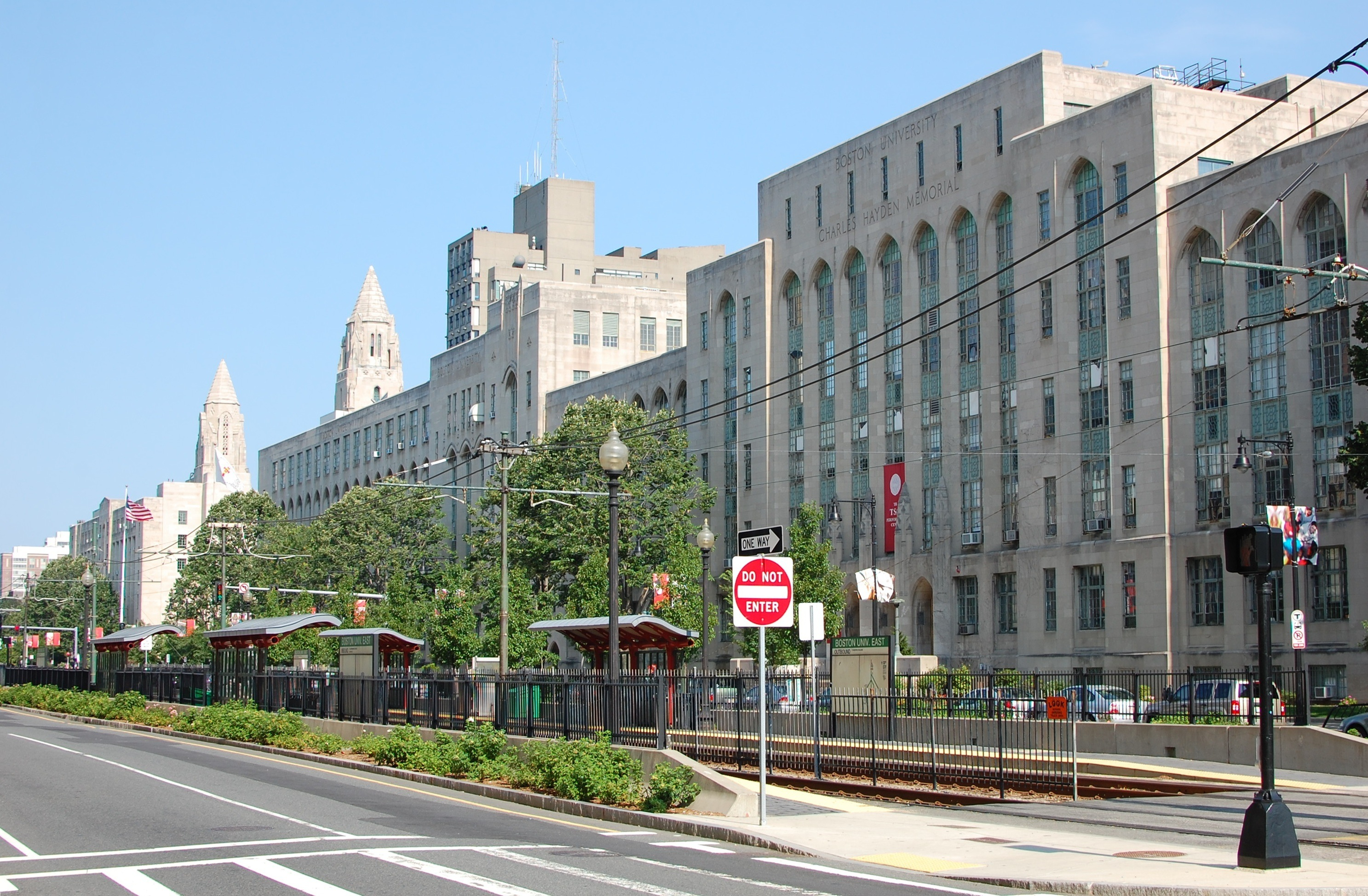
The College of Arts and Sciences fronts along busy Commonwealth Avenue

Most of the buildings of the main campus are located on or near Commonwealth Avenue, served by the Kenmore subway stop on the Green Line and five surface stops on the Green Line B branch. Crowding on the busy B branch is very seasonal; during the summer, ridership falls by more than half, largely due to the reduced student population. The South Campus and Fenway Campus areas are served by St. Mary's Street on the C branch and Fenway on the D branch. MBTA bus route 57 parallels the B branch on Commonwealth Avenue; Lansdowne on the MBTA Commuter Rail Framingham/Worcester Line is located near East Campus.

Bicycle traffic on Commonwealth Avenue is heavy, and advocacy groups have held public meetings with BU, the MBTA, and the City of Boston to improve safety and congestion along this travel corridor. The MBTA plans to consolidate and reduce the number of stops along Commonwealth Avenue to speed travel and to reduce construction costs to upgrade the remaining stations. Improvements planned include full handicapped accessibility at the new stations, fencing to encourage pedestrians to use protected crosswalks, traffic signal prioritization for transit vehicles, and improved esthetics. The Commonwealth Avenue Improvement Project is coordinated by the Massachusetts Highway Department, in cooperation with BU, the MBTA, the City of Boston, the Boston Water and Sewer Commission, and other organizations.

The medical campus is served by the 1 bus, which runs along Massachusetts Avenue, and the 47 and CT3 crosstown buses, which connect the Boston University Medical Center with the Longwood Medical Area. The Silver Line SL4 and SL5 run the entire length of the Medical Campus, one block north of most parts of the campus; it connects Boston University Medical Center with Tufts Medical Center station and downtown Boston. The nearest rapid transit subway station is the Massachusetts Avenue station on the Orange Line, located three blocks north of the Medical Center.

==== Sustainability ====
The university has a sustainability initiative and a sustainability office. Boston University's Strategic Plan for Campus Sustainability is also integrated into the university's overarching strategic plan in many areas including the Climate Action Plan Task Force, a faculty-led initiative developing the university's first Climate Action Plan. The Campus Climate Lab, led by the Boston University Institute for Global Sustainability in partnership with Boston University Sustainability and the Office of Research, provides opportunities for student-led research projects that support sustainability on the campus.

In July 2022, social scientist Benjamin Sovacool led the establishment of the Boston University Institute for Global Sustainability. Formerly the Institute for Sustainable Energy, the university-wide institute advances cross-disciplinary research on sustainability with a focus on justice and equity.

The university bought a wind farm in South Dakota to meet its goal of carbon neutrality by 2040.

=== Other campuses ===
==== London campus ====
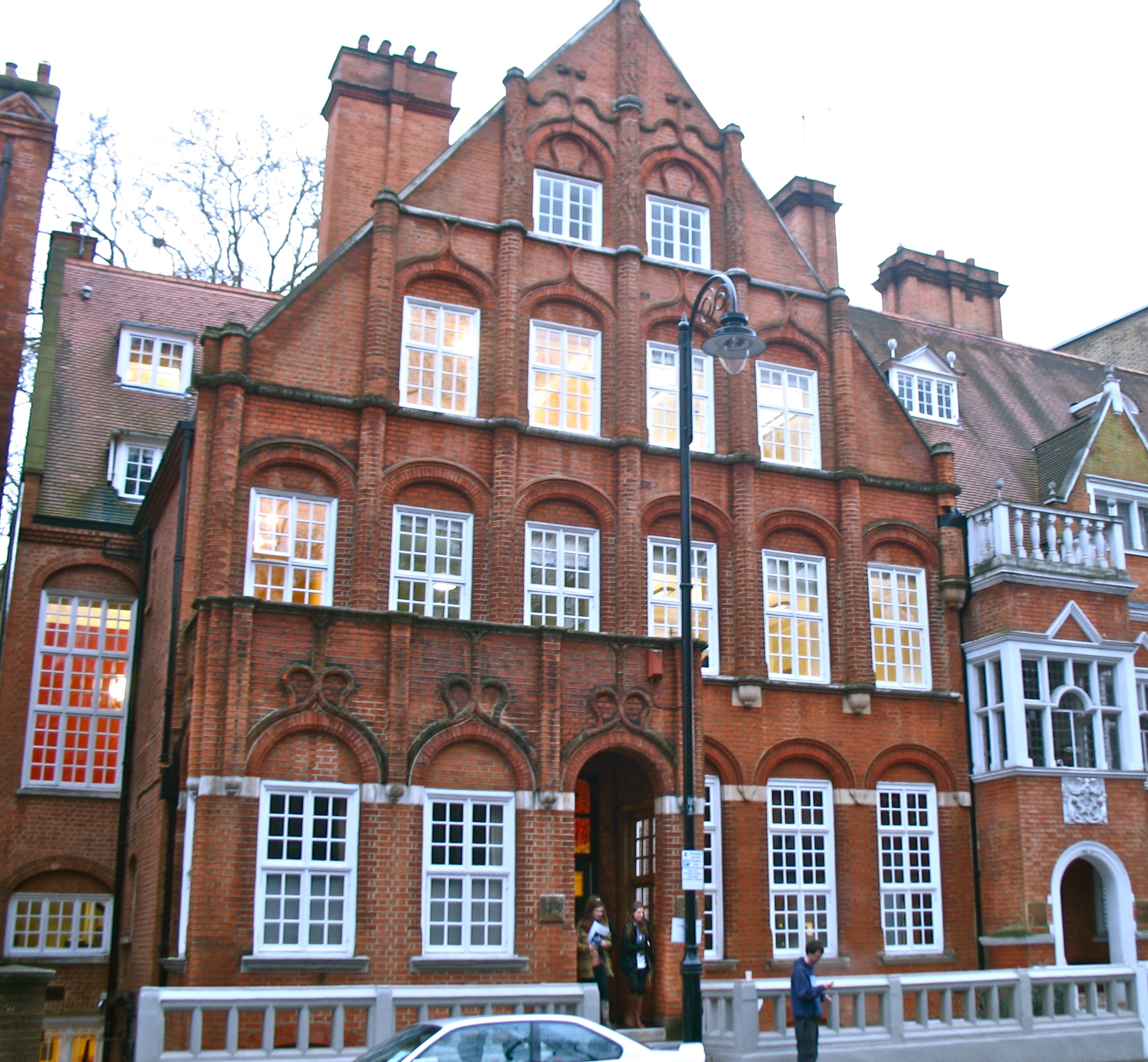
43 Harrington Gardens, the main academic building for Boston University's London Campus

Boston University's largest study abroad program is located in London, England. Boston University London Programmes offers a semester of study and work in London through their London Internship Program (LIP), as well as a number of other specialized programs. The LIP program combines a professional internship with coursework that examines a particular academic area in the context of Britain's history, culture, and society and its role in modern Europe. Courses in each academic area are taught exclusively to students enrolled in the Boston University program by a selected faculty body representing multiple cultural backgrounds. Upon successful completion of a semester, students earn 16 Boston University credits. BU London Programmes are headquartered in South Kensington, London. The campus consists of the main building at 43 Harrington Gardens, as well as three nearby residences to house students. This program is open to Boston University students, as well as students at other American colleges.

==== Los Angeles campus ====
In Los Angeles, the university has an internship program for students to study and work in the heart of the film, television, advertising, public relations, and entertainment management and law industries. The program offers three tracks from which undergraduate and graduate students can choose: Advertising and Public Relations, Film and Television, and Entertainment Management. Graduated students have the opportunity to continue their education by enrolling in the Los Angeles Certificate Program, where students can choose either the Acting in Hollywood or the Writer in Hollywood track. Courses are taught by Boston University faculty and alumni who serve as mentors in and out of the classroom. Upon successful completion of a semester students will earn 16 Boston University credits. Students who successfully complete the Los Angeles Certificate Program will receive 8 Boston University credits and a certificate from Boston University College of Fine Arts or College of Communication.

==== Paris campus ====
The Paris Center runs several programs, the largest of which is the Paris Internship Program dating from 1989. Students take language and elective courses with French faculty at the BU Paris Center, then are placed in internships with French businesses and organizations in the area. Students live with host families or in a dormitory for the extent of the semester. Boston University Paris also organizes exchange programs with the business school Paris Dauphine University and a yearlong program with the Institut d'études politiques de Paris (Sciences Po).

==== Washington, D.C. campus ====
In Washington, D.C., Boston University offers internship, journalism and management programs. Students study in the university's building on Massachusetts Avenue in Dupont Circle and take advantage of the city by interning at different locations. In 2011, the university completed construction of a new, multistory residence to house students in the program featuring touch-less entry cards for security and suites with communal kitchens, right next to the Woodley Park Metro station. The Multimedia and Journalism program allows students to act as Washington, D.C. correspondents for newspapers and television stations across the Northeast and New England while interning at major news outlets in the city, as well as at many PR internships in politics, government and public affairs. Internship opportunities are also offered in a wide variety of sectors for students enrolled in other BU Study Abroad Washington programs.

==== Sydney campus ====
In Sydney, Australia, Boston University has internship, management, film festival, travel writing, engineering, and School of Education programs that vary based on semester. Around 150 students live in the university's building in Chippendale developed by Tony Owen Partners. The building uses "fissures to provide maximum solar access to bedrooms as well as natural ventilation throughout the building". The building opened in the beginning of 2011 and features underground classrooms, a lecture hall, office space, library, and a roof patio.

Other internship and study abroad opportunities are available through the Study Abroad office.

== Academics ==
=== Colleges and schools ===
College/School	Year founded
School of Theology	1839
Chobanian & Avedisian School of Medicine	1848
School of Law	1872
College of Arts & Sciences	1873
Graduate School of Arts & Sciences	1874
Sargent College of Health and Rehabilitation Sciences (Sargent College)	1881
Questrom School of Business	1913
Wheelock College of Education & Human Development	1918
School of Social Work	1940
College of Communication	1947
College of Engineering	1950
College of General Studies	1952
College of Fine Arts	1954
Henry M. Goldman School of Dental Medicine	1963
Metropolitan College	1965
School of Public Health	1976
School of Hospitality Administration	1981
Arvind & Chandan Nandlal Kilachand Honors College (Note: Though not a degree granting college, students enrolled in it must take courses provided by the college itself. Students not in the program are not allowed to take courses provided by this college.)	2010
Frederick S. Pardee School of Global Studies	2014

Boston University offers bachelor's, master's, doctorate, medical, dental, and law degrees through its 17 schools and colleges. The newest school at Boston University is the Frederick S. Pardee School of Global Studies (established 2014). Boston University Wheelock College of Education & Human Development was renamed in 2018 following the merger with Wheelock College. In 2019, BU created the Faculty of Computing & Data Sciences, which is an interdisciplinary academic unit that will train students in computing and enable them to combine data science with their chosen field. In 2022, BU's medical school was renamed the Aram V. Chobanian & Edward Avedisian School of Medicine (following a $100 million gift from Edward Avedisian, a career clarinetist). In December 2024, the Center for Computing & Data Sciences was renamed the Duan Family Center for Computing & Data Sciences.

Each school and college at the university has a three letter abbreviation, which is commonly used in place of their full school or college name. For example, the College of Arts & Sciences is commonly referred to as CAS, the College of Engineering is ENG, the College of General Studies is CGS, and the College of Fine Arts is CFA.

The College of Fine Arts was formerly named the School of Fine Arts (SFA). The College of Arts & Sciences (CAS) was formerly named the College of Liberal Arts (CLA). The College of Communication was formerly named the School of Public Communication (SPC). The Questrom School of Business (Questrom) was formerly known as the School of Management (SMG), and the College of Business Administration (CBA) prior to that. The College of General Studies (CGS) was formerly named the College of Basic Studies (CBS).

The Mental Health Counseling and Behavioral Medicine (MHCBM) Program at Boston University School of Medicine offers a master's degree for students who wish to become licensed to practice as a mental health counselor. The program adheres to educational guidelines and standards of the American Counseling Association (ACA), American Mental Health Counselors Association (AMHCA), and the Council for Accreditation of Counseling and Related Educational Programs (CACREP), which is an independent agency recognized by the Council for Higher Education Accreditation. The MHCBM Program is the only counselor education program in the entire United States that is housed in a medical school for solely training students in clinical mental health counseling to treat clients and patients with a mental disorder via counseling and psychotherapy. Boston University is accredited by the New England Commission of Higher Education.

=== Admissions ===
Fall freshman statistics

	2024	2023	2022	2021	2020	2019
Applicants	78,769	80,495	80,794	75,733	61,006	62,210
Admits	8,743	8,733	11,434	13,884	11,286	11,260
Admit Rate (%)	11.1	10.9	14.4	18.3	18.5	18.1
Enrolled	3,268	3,145	3,635	3,200	3,100	3,100
Yield (%)	37.3	36.0	31.8	23.1	27.5	27.5
Avg Unweighted GPA	3.9	3.9	3.95	3.90	3.90	3.82
SAT Middle 50%	1469	1419	1491	1482	1470	1468

Based on currently enrolled student responses within the university student database 50.6% white, 14% Asian, 11.6% international students, 8.6% Hispanic, and 3.2% black. Fall 2015 international student enrollment at Boston University is 43% Chinese, 9% Indian, 5% Korean, 5% Saudi Arabian, 4% Canadian, 4% Taiwanese, 2% Turkish, and 1% from each of the following countries: Venezuela, Brazil, Mexico, Italy, France, Thailand, Spain, and Japan. The other 18% of international enrollment comes from 123 other countries. Among international students, 39% are pursuing undergraduate degrees, 37% are pursuing graduate degrees, and 23% are enrolled in other programs. BU has the largest number of Jews out of all private schools in the U.S. with about 6,000 students identifying as Jewish.

The plurality of registrants were from Massachusetts (19%), followed by New York (16%), New Jersey (9%), California (8%), Connecticut (4%), Pennsylvania (4%), and Texas (2%).

Boston University's financial aid program, "affordableBU", meets 100% of the demonstrated need of domestic students (U.S. citizens and permanent residents).

=== Rankings ===
Academic rankings

National
- Forbes: 45
- U.S. News & World Report: 34 (tie)
- Washington Monthly: 69
- WSJ/College Pulse: 171

Global
- ARWU: 101–150
- QS: 88 (tie)
- THE: 76
- U.S. News & World Report: 86 (tie)

USNWR graduate school rankings as of 2025
Business	46
Education	35
Engineering	32
Law	24
Public Health	9
Social Work	12
Occupational Therapy	1

USNWR departmental rankings as of 2026
Biomedical Engineering	10
Biological Sciences	72
Chemistry	57
Clinical Psychology	19
Computer Science	46
Earth Sciences	101
Economics	24
English	40
Fine Arts	75
Health Care Management	16
History	47
Mathematics	51
Physics	52
Political Science	58
Psychology	39
Public Health	9
Social Work	12
Sociology	36
Speech-Language Pathology	6
Statistics	47

U.S. News & World Report ranks Boston University tied for 34th among national universities and tied for 86th among global universities for 2026. It also ranked BU 26th in "Best Value Schools" and tied for 48th in "Best Undergraduate Engineering Programs" at schools whose highest degree is a doctorate. U.S. News & World Report's 2026 list also ranks Boston University's online graduate information technology programs 12th (tie) in the U.S. the online graduate criminal justice programs tied for 5th, and the online graduate business programs (excluding MBAs) tied for 12th.

Boston University is ranked No. 171 nationally in the 2025 Wall Street Journal/College Pulse U.S. colleges and universities ranking.

QS World University Rankings ranked Boston University 88th overall in the world in its 2026 rankings.

Times Higher Education ranked Boston University 76th in the world for 2026.

Times Higher Education ranked Boston University 34th in the 2026 Global University Employability Rankings.

The Academic Ranking of World Universities ranks Boston University 38–48 in the United States, and 101–150 in the world, in its 2025 list.

In 2016, the Chronicle of Higher Education placed the Boston University School of Social Work as sixth in the nation for research productivity by faculty.

Boston University is also one of 250 global universities selected for the Emerging Group's 2026 Global Employability University Ranking and Survey (GEURS), and is ranked 34th in the world (13th in the U.S.) within this select group.

BU is one of 146 American universities receiving the highest research classification ("RU/VH") by the Carnegie Foundation.

=== Research ===
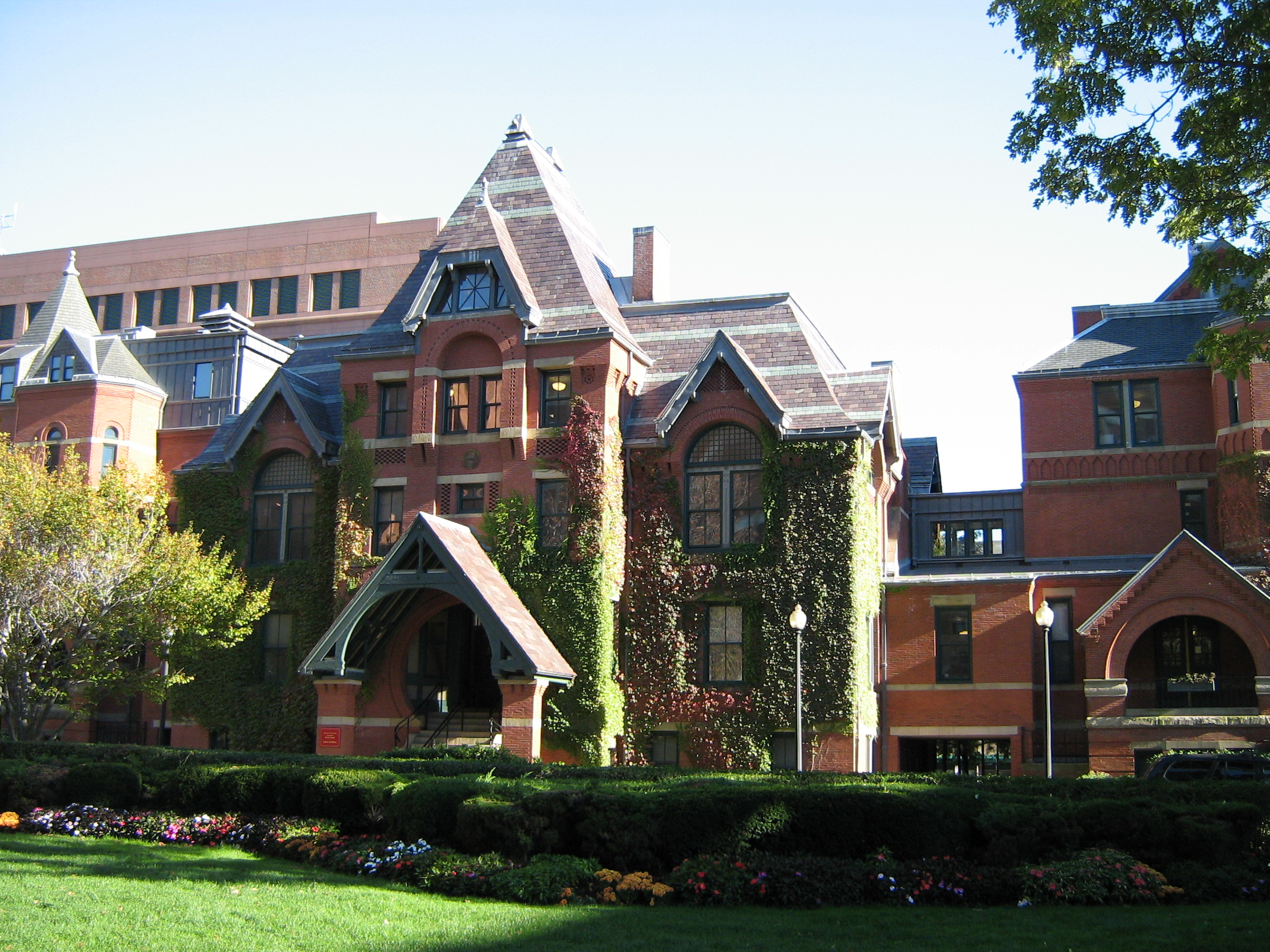
The Talbot Building located on the medical campus houses the School of Public Health

In 2024, the university reported in $579.5M million in total research awards, and in fiscal year 2023 it ranked 16th in the U.S. among private institutions for all research and development expenditures. Funding sources included the National Science Foundation (NSF), the National Institutes of Health (NIH), the U.S. Department of Defense, the European Commission, the Susan G. Komen Foundation, and the federal Health Resources and Services Administration. The university's research enterprise encompasses dozens of fields, but its primary focus currently lies in seven areas: data science, engineering biology, global health, infectious diseases, neuroscience, photonics, and urban health. BU since 1976 has also offered Research in Science & Engineering (RISE), a competitive six-week summer program at Boston University for high school seniors, with an acceptance rate between its internship track and practicum track of about 3.9%.

In 2017, BU received a $20 million grant over five years from the NSF in order to establish an Engineering Research Center (ERC). The ERC's goal is to bioengineer functional heart tissue. The director of the center is David Bishop, a professor of physics and computer and electrical engineering.

Boston University biomedical engineering professor Irving J. Bigio developed elastic scattering spectroscopy, an optical technique later used in the DermaSensor device to assess skin lesions for possible cancer.

In 2003, the National Institute of Allergy and Infectious Diseases awarded Boston University a grant to build one of two National Biocontainment Laboratories. The National Emerging Infectious Diseases Laboratories (NEIDL) was created to study emerging infectious diseases that pose a significant threat to public health. NEIDL has biosafety level 2, 3, and 4 (BSL-2, BSL-3, and BSL-4, respectively) labs that enable researchers to work safely with the pathogens. BSL-4 labs are the highest level of biosafety labs and work with diseases with a high risk of aerosol transmission.

In addition to this laboratory-based infectious disease research, in 2021 the university launched the Center on Emerging Infectious Diseases (CEID) which focuses on public health and policy research addressing infectious disease preparedness and response. Led by founding director Dr. Nahid Bhadelia, CEID's work centers around the epidemiology, communication, public health, and policy drivers of emerging infectious diseases. In April 2025, CEID debuted its flagship program, the Biothreats Emergence, Analysis and Communications Network (BEACON), an open access, informal biothreats surveillance and program in partnership with the Hariri Institute for Computing and Data Sciences at Boston University and HealthMap at Boston Children’s Hospital. BEACON combines AI with a global network of infectious disease experts for more rapid analysis, reporting of, and response to emerging threats. Following the United States's withdrawal from the World Health Organization, several states' departments of public health have turned to BEACON as a trusted source of international information sharing.

The strategic plan also encouraged research collaborations with industry and government partners. In 2016, as part of a broadbased effort to solve the critical problem of antibiotic resistance, the U.S. Department of Health & Human Services (HHS) selected the BU School of Law (LAW)—and Kevin Outterson, a BU professor of law—to lead a $350 million trans-Atlantic public-private partnership called CARB-X to foster the preclinical development of new antibiotics and antimicrobial rapid diagnostics and vaccines. CARB-X was allotted an additional $370 million in funding in May 2022. HHS will continue to support CARB-X with up to $300 million over 10 years, and global charity Wellcome will fund up to $70 million over three years. In May 2023, CARB-X secured renewed funding from the UK government (£24M over four years) and the German government (€39M over four years, and €2M for accelerator), and the Canadian government also announced its plan to support CARB-X with CAD $6.3 million over two years.

In its effort to increase diversity and inclusion, Boston University appointed Ibram X. Kendi in July 2020 as a history professor and the director and founder of its newly established Center for Antiracist Research. The university also appointed alumna Andrea Taylor as its first senior diversity officer. Later in August, Twitter founder and then CEO Jack Dorsey donated $10 million to the Center, noting that the gift came with "no string attached." Ibram Kendi was named a 2021 MacArthur fellow and will receive a "genius grant" of $625,000 split over five years for his center's research.

On March 2, 2025, the Lunar Environment heliospheric X-ray Imager (LEXI) telescope landed on the moon—a first for BU—aboard NASA's Blue Ghost lunar lander. BU researchers involved included principal investigator Brian Walsh, lead data scientist Ramiz Qudsi, and others. LEXI will send information on Earth's magnetic shield back to BU for analysis.

=== Grade deflation ===
The independently run student newspaper at Boston University, The Daily Free Press, and The New York Times, have published articles exploring the existence of grade deflation. The Times discovered that administrators have suggested to faculty members deflated ideal grade distributions. Although an article in the official publication BU Today asserted that "the GPAs of BU undergrads and the percentage of As and Bs have both risen over the last two decades", The New York Times has found BU grades have been rising more slowly with respect to many other schools.

In 2014, the average GPA of a BU undergraduate was 3.16, compared to the averages of 3.35 for Boston College (2007), 3.48 for Amherst College (2006), 3.52 for New York University (2015), and 3.65 for Harvard University (2015).

About 81 percent of all grades earned are in either the A or B range (75% in the B range). The article went on to note that although the university attempted to curb grade inflation and inconsistency in the late 1990s, both the percentage of As and GPAs have been rising since. They attributed the grade inflation that has occurred not to teachers' grading policies, but to the increasing quality of each incoming class which leads to more top grades.

=== Journals and publication ===
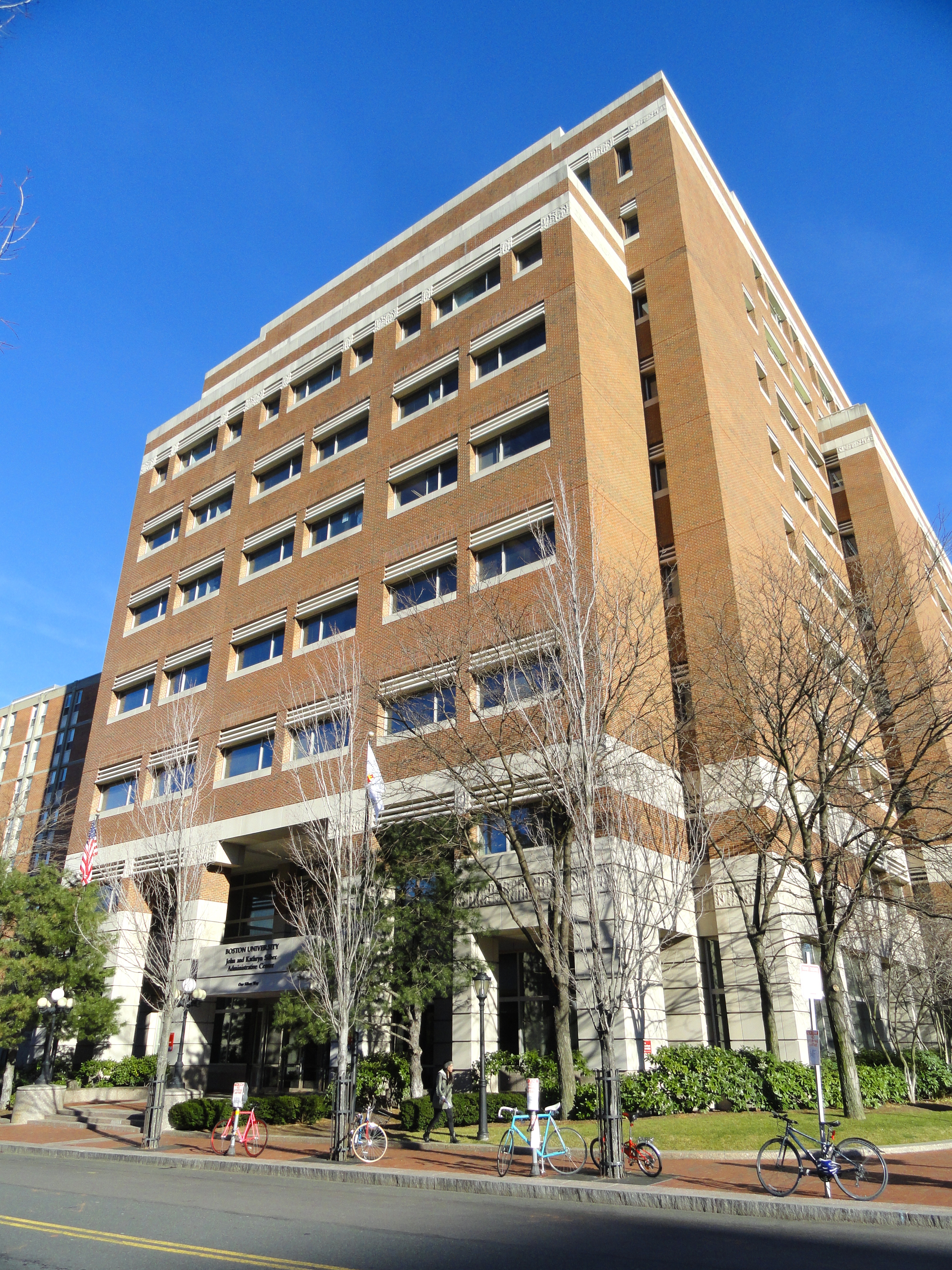
The Rafik B. Hariri Building houses the Questrom School of Business and the office of the university president

Boston University is home to several academic journals and publications. The School of Law hosts six nationally recognized law journals: the Boston University Law Review, American Journal of Law and Medicine, Review of Banking & Financial Law, Boston University International Law Journal, Journal of Science and Technology Law, and Public Interest Law Journal. The School of Education houses the Journal of Education, which is the oldest continuously published journal in the field of education in the country. In the College of Arts and Sciences, Studies in Romanticism is housed at the Department of English and the Journal of Field Archeology is housed at the Department of Archeology. The Department of History is affiliated with The Historical Society, which publishes The Journal of the Historical Society and Historically Speaking. The American Journal of Media Psychology and the Public Relations Journal are currently edited by professors at the College of Communication, which is also home to the New England Center for Investigative Reporting, which generates numerous publications yearly.

=== Special academic programs ===
==== BU Hub ====
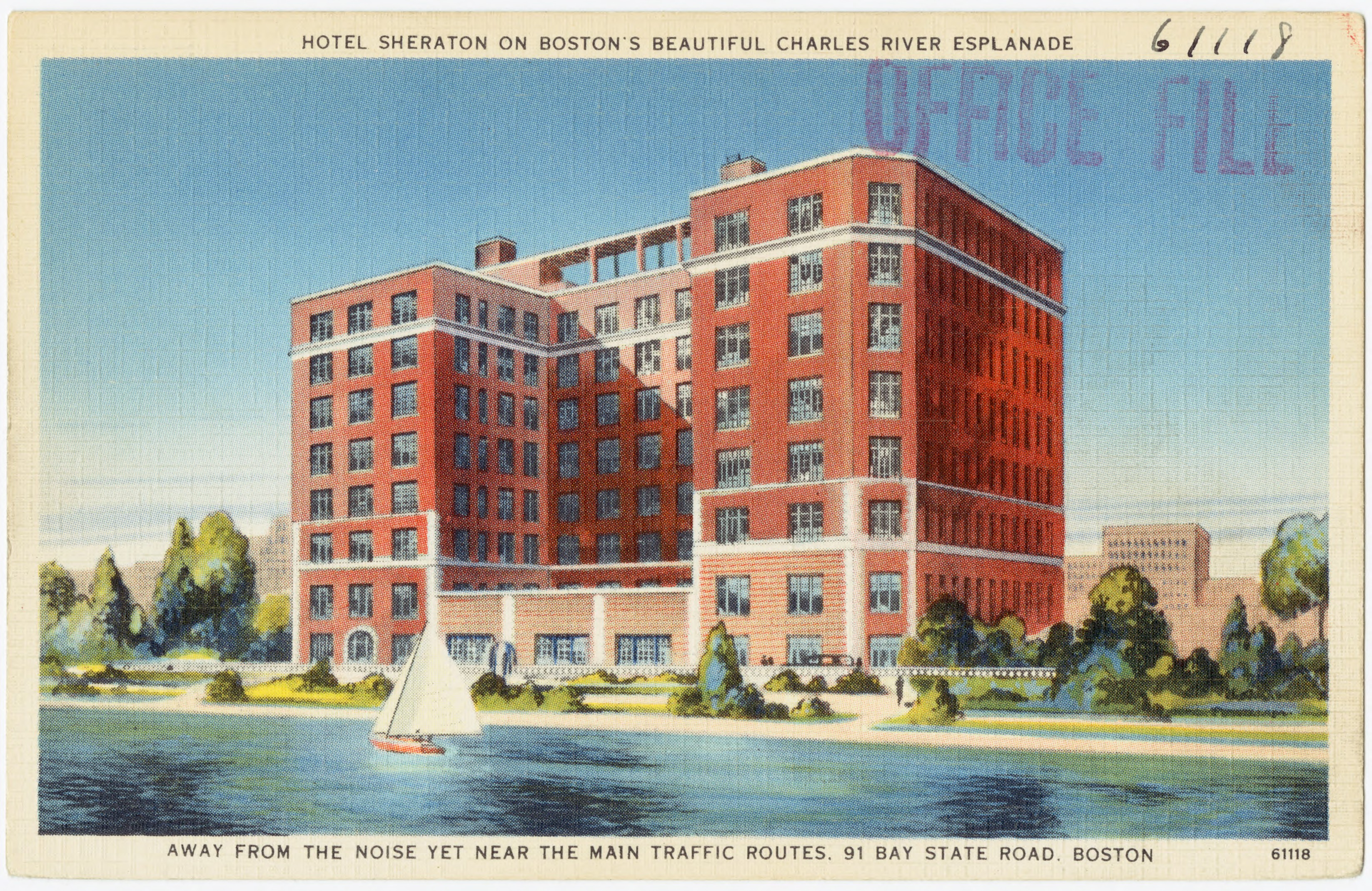
Kilachand Hall, formerly Shelton Hall and home of BU's Kilachand Honors College, viewed from the Charles River

BU Hub, the university-wide undergraduate core curriculum, requires courses and learning experiences that develop six essential capacities. These essential capacities include: philosophical, aesthetic, and historical interpretation; scientific and social inquiry; quantitative reasoning; diversity, civic engagement, and global citizenship; written, oral, and multimedia communication; and an intellectual toolkit that includes critical thinking, collaboration, and creativity.

==== Kilachand Honors College ====
Boston University's honors college matriculated its first class in 2010. In 2011, it was renamed Arvind and Chandan Nandlal Kilachand Honors College following a $25 million donation from alum and billionaire businessman, Rajen Kilachand. The Kilachand Honors College is a university-wide community of faculty and students dedicated to preserving, renewing, and rethinking classic ideals of liberal education: love of learning, intellectual curiosity, self-discovery, empathy, clarity of thought and expression. It rests on three pillars: an integrated, four-year curriculum; an extensive series of co-curricular events that include site-visits to leading cultural institutions as well as talks and readings by leading figures in the arts, sciences, and professions; and, finally, a "living and learning" community that offers students the personal atmosphere of a small liberal arts college and fosters responsibility and citizenship.

In 2013, Kilachand donated an additional $10 million to fund a renovation of Kilachand Hall, where first year students in the honors college are required to live. Kilachand would go on to become one of Boston University's largest benefactors upon donating $115 million to bolster the university's research at the intersection of the life sciences and engineering in 2017. The gift created the Rajen Kilachand Center for Integrated Life Sciences & Engineering and a $100 million endowment that advances, in perpetuity, groundbreaking research at the intersection of the life sciences and engineering.

=== Boston University Academy ===
Boston University Academy (BUA) is a private high school operated by Boston University. It has an enrollment of 234 students (2023) in grades 9–12 and a 10:1 student-to-teacher ratio. It is the only high school in New England that is part of a major research university. Founded in 1993, the school sits within the university's campus and students are offered the opportunity to take university courses with BU students. The mean SAT score for the BUA class of 2023 was 1491 (98th percentile), and the mean ACT was 34 (99th percentile). 41% of the class of 2023 were recognized by the National Merit Scholarship Program.

== Student life ==
Student body composition as of January 23, 2025
Race and ethnicity	Total
Non-Hispanic whites	33%
Foreign national	23%
Asian	20%
Hispanic	11%
Other (Note: Other consists of Multiracial Americans & those who prefer to not say.)	9%
Black	5%
Economic diversity
Low-income (Note: The percentage of students who received an income-based federal Pell grant intended for low-income students.)	18%
Affluent (Note: The percentage of students who are a part of the American middle class at the bare minimum.)	82%

=== Student publications ===
Independent from the university, The Daily Free Press, often referred to as The FreeP, is the campus student newspaper and the fourth largest daily newspaper in Boston. Since 1970, it has provided students with campus news, city and state news, sports coverage, editorials, arts and entertainment, and special feature stories. The Daily Free Press is published every regular instruction day of the university year and is available in BU dorms, classroom buildings, and commercial locations frequented by students.

The literary magazine Clarion has been printed since 1998. The first issue, titled "?", was published by the group Students for Literary Awareness with the sponsorship of the Department of English; subsequent issues were issued by the BU Literary Society, and most recently, by the BU BookLab. Burn Magazine is a younger literary magazine, affiliated with Clarion, but publishing the work of student authors only.

=== ROTC ===
The Reserve Officer Training Corps (ROTC) at BU traces its origins back to August 16, 1919, when the US War Department stood up the Students' Army Training Corps at Boston University, the predecessor to the current Army ROTC program. Today, BU is one of twenty five colleges and universities in the country to host all three ROTC programs – Army, Navy, and Air Force. Students wishing to be commissioned into the Marine Corps study as Navy Midshipmen.

=== Honor societies ===
Alpha Phi Sigma – Nu Mu chapter

== Athletics ==
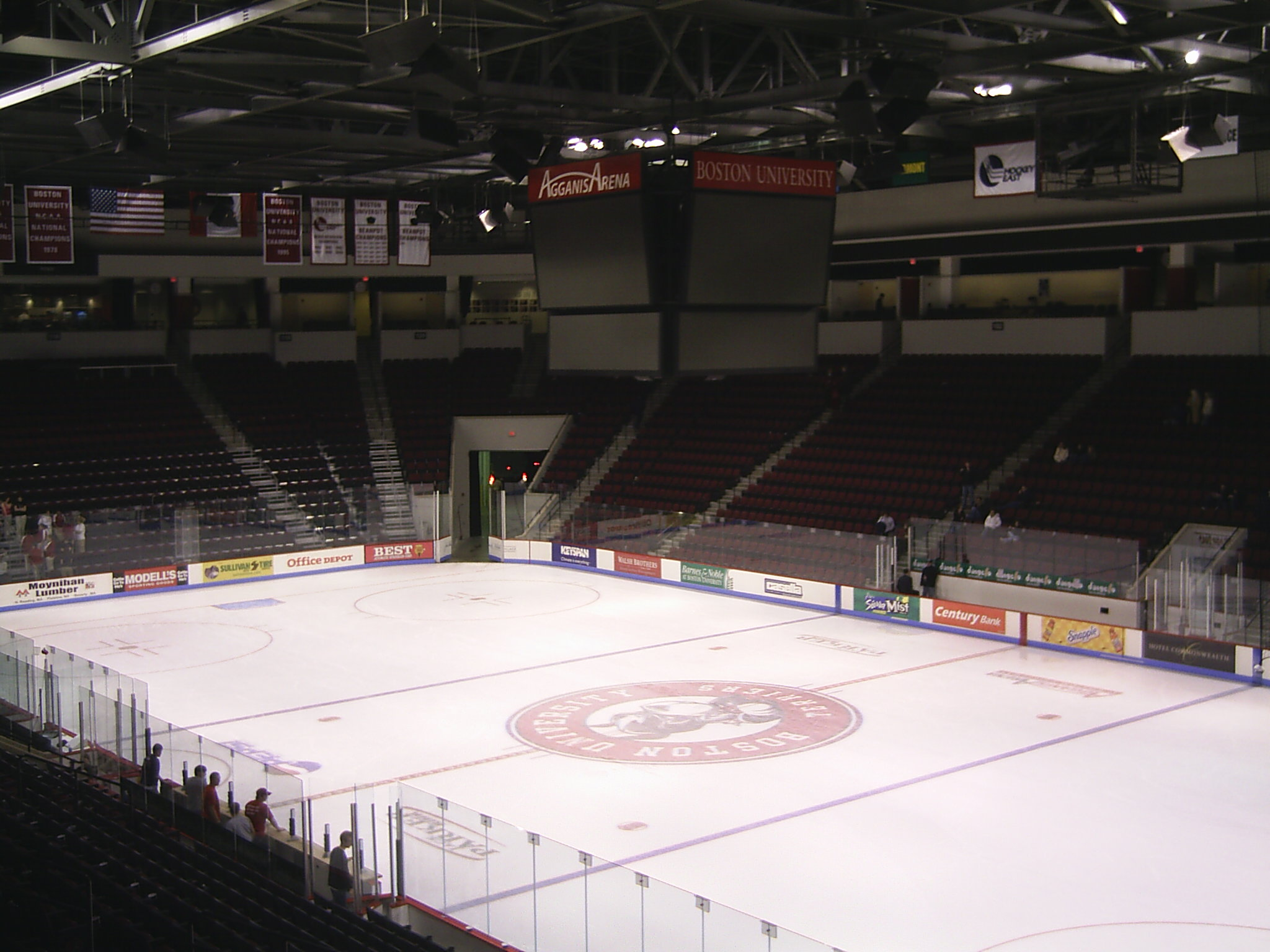
Agganis Arena following a hockey game

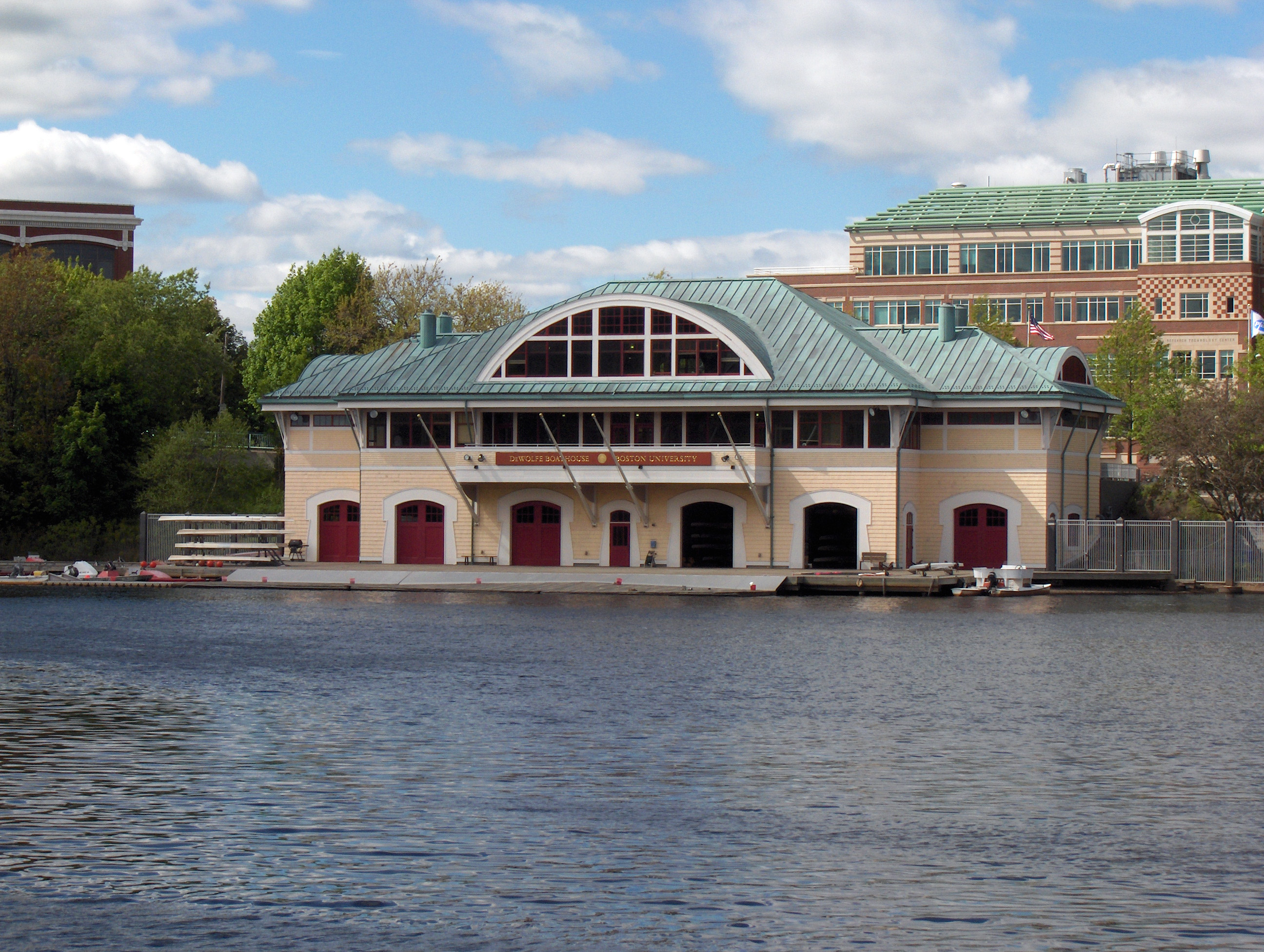
DeWolfe Boathouse

Boston University's NCAA Division I Terriers compete in men's basketball, cross country, golf, ice hockey, rowing, soccer, swimming, tennis, track, and lacrosse, and in women's basketball, dance, cross country, field hockey, golf, ice hockey, lacrosse, rowing, soccer, softball, swimming, tennis, and track. Boston University athletics teams compete in the Patriot League, Hockey East, and Coastal Athletic Association conferences, and their mascot is Rhett the Boston Terrier. As of 1 July 2013, a majority of Boston University's teams compete in the Patriot League. On April 1, 2013, the university announced it would cut its wrestling program following the 2013–14 season.

The Boston University men's hockey team is the most successful on campus, and is a storied college hockey power, with five NCAA championships, most recently in 2009. The team was coached by hall-of-famer Jack Parker for 40 seasons, and is a major supplier of talent to the NHL, as well as to the 1980 USA Olympic gold medal-winning men's hockey team. The Terriers have won 32 Beanpot titles, more than any other team in the tournament, which includes Harvard University, Boston College, and Northeastern University. The BU Women's ice hockey team has won 2 Beanpot titles, once in 1981 and once in 2019. Boston University also won a game in 2010 against Boston College at Fenway Park by a score of 3–2, played a week after the NHL Winter Classic.

In July 2024, Macklin Celebrini was drafted first overall to the San Jose Sharks of the NHL. He is the second Terrier to be drafted first overall—with Rick DiPietro going first in 2000 to the New York Islanders.

BU has also won two national championships in women's rowing, in 1991 and 1992.

In 2020, the men's basketball team won the Patriot League Men's Basketball Championship for the first time, but the NCAA men's Division I basketball tournament was canceled due to coronavirus concerns.

The softball team won their fifth Patriot League Championship title in six seasons, defeating Lehigh 1–0 on May 11, 2024.

The women's tennis team has won the most conference titles of any varsity sport at Boston University, and currently holds 28 conference titles across the America East and Patriot League Conferences, having most recently defeated its two major rivals, Navy and Army, back-to-back in the 2025 post-season conference tournament. The women's tennis team has competed in NCAA national competition 19 times.

Boston University's Agganis Arena opened on January 3, 2005, with a men's hockey game between the Terriers and the University of Minnesota Golden Gophers. The arena also hosts non-sporting events, such as concerts, ice shows, and other performances.

Boston University disbanded its football team in 1997. The university used the nearly $3 million from its football program to build the multimillion-dollar John Hancock Student Village and athletic complex. The university also increased funding to women's athletic programs. "By implementing the total plan, we can achieve a much more balanced set of sports programs for both men and women, which is consistent with the philosophy underlying Title IX", said former BU athletic director Gary Strickler.

=== Club sports ===
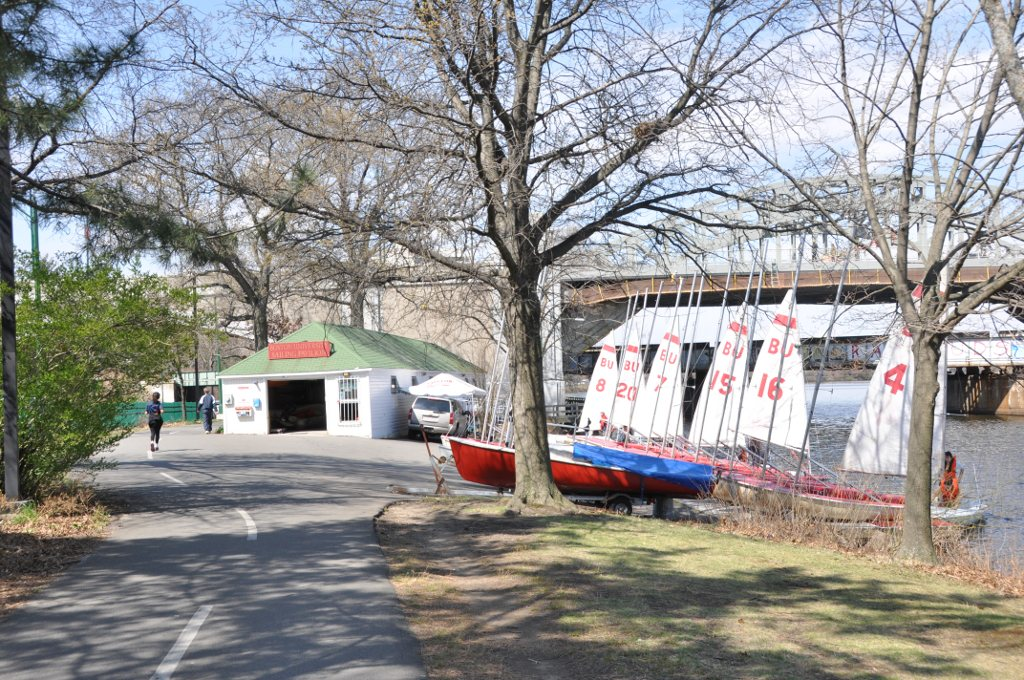
BU Sailing Pavilion

Boston University students also compete in athletics at the club level. Thirty-four club sports are recognized by the university: badminton; baseball; cricket; cycling; equestrian; fencing; figure skating; golf; gymnastics; inline, men's, and women's ice hockey; jiu-jitsu; kendo; kung fu; women's and men's rugby; sailing; Shotokan karate; ski racing; snowboarding; men's and women's soccer; squash; women's synchronized skating; synchronized swimming; table tennis; triathlon; women's and men's ultimate frisbee; men's and women's volleyball; and women's and men's water polo.

The BU Sailing Team is one of the most successful teams in college sailing. The team has won seven National Championships, most recently in 1999. They have also had three team members graduate as "College Sailor of the Year". Notable alumni of the team include Ken Read, skipper for PUMA Ocean Racing in the Volvo Ocean Race, and 2012 US Sailing Rolex Yachtsman of the Year nominee, John Mollicone.

The BU Figure Skating Team has won seven Intercollegiate National Figure Skating Championships and has not finished outside of the top three since 2009. They are the most decorated team in collegiate figure skating.

The BU Men's Club Volleyball team won the NCVF 1AA National Championship in 2016.

The BU Roller Hockey Team advanced to the NCHRA Tournament in 2001, 2002, and 2003. The team advanced all the way to the Final Four in 2001.

Both Men's and Women's Intervarsity Table Tennis Teams have attended the National Collegiate Table Tennis Tournaments and ranked as high as the top 10 nationwide.

== Notable alumni and academics ==
Among its alumni and current or past faculty, the university counts 9 Nobel Laureates, 23 Pulitzer Prize winners, 10 Rhodes Scholars, 6 Marshall Scholars, 14 Academy Award winners, 11 Emmy Award winners, and 9 Tony Award winners. BU also has three MacArthur Fellows and Fulbright Scholars among its past and present graduates and faculty. In 1876, BU professor Alexander Graham Bell invented the telephone in a BU lab.

== In popular culture ==
Boston University has sometimes been referenced in popular culture. For example, in 1962, Timothy Leary performed his Marsh Chapel Experiment, also known as the "Good Friday Experiment", in the university's Marsh Chapel. The experiment investigated whether psilocybin (the active principle in psilocybin mushrooms) would act as a reliable entheogen in religiously predisposed subjects. Boston University's campuses have also appeared in several movies, including The Social Network and Ghostbusters (2016).

== See also ==
- Boston University Police Department
- Boston University Tanglewood Institute
- Einstein Papers Project
- Framingham Heart Study
