= Bay State =

Bay State may refer to:

- Massachusetts, nicknamed the "Bay State", a U.S. state with shores on Massachusetts Bay, Cape Cod Bay, Buzzards Bay and Narragansett Bay
- Bay State College, a defunct private university in Boston, Massachusetts
- Bay State Conference, a high school athletic conference in Massachusetts
- Bay State (TV series), the Boston University-produced soap opera
- Bay State Road, a street on the Boston University campus
- Bay State (musical instrument brand), a brand of musical instrument made in the 19th century by John C. Haynes & Co.
