= WTBU (Boston University) =

Student radio station at Boston University

Coordinates: 42°21′0.73″N 71°5′39.9″W

WTBU Radio
- United States
- Broadcast area: Boston University campus
- Frequency: 89.3 MHz
- Branding: WTBU

Programming
- Format: College radio (free-form/sports/news)

Ownership
- Owner: Boston University College of Communication

History
- First air date: 1960; 66 years ago
- Call sign meaning: Terriers of Boston University

Links
- Website: sites.bu.edu/wtbu headphones.bu.edu/live wtbu.bu.edu:1800

WTBU (89.3 MHz) is a student-managed and operated radio station at Boston University (BU). Under Title 47 CFR Part 15, it does not require a license, and operates legally under special "low power" rules (not to be confused with LPFM FCC licensed stations). The operation does not qualify for an official call sign; thus the identification as "WTBU" is a self-assigned branding.

WTBU has a block-format programming schedule, with individual DJs allowed to play whatever they choose during their weekly shifts (usually two hours in length). Overall the sound skews mostly to rock, but can vary significantly, including pop, rap, and dance.

WTBU is on the air 20 hours a day, any day that the BU dorms are open (at least eight months of the year). During the summers the studios may be used for special classroom exercises by the Boston University College of Communication (COM).

Taking advantage of the large number of broadcast journalism majors at COM, there are regular newscasts and sports updates. There is also extensive live coverage of BU sporting events, like hockey, basketball, soccer and more.

WTBU is entirely student managed. There is a faculty advisor with some oversight duties. Virtually all positions are unpaid volunteers. There is an informal policy of only having current students to be on the air; community volunteers and alumni are not allowed.

There is no formal class curriculum specifically for radio broadcasting at BU, save for some broadcast journalism classes that include radio.

== History ==
The earliest known reference to WTBU comes from the 1960 Boston University HUB (the name for the student yearbook at the time). Some students listed both WBUR and WTBU, suggesting that originally there was some overlap in staff between the two stations.

The studios were originally located on the second floor of the George Sherman (student) Union building. In 1969 it moved to the first floor of the Myles Standish Hall dormitory. In 1982, it moved into the new Myles Standish Annex, where the defunct Grahm Junior College was; the actual broadcast from the new space was delayed several months due to a broken water main. In the late 1980s, the basement studios were completely refurbished with new soundproofing and angled windows. In 1997, WTBU moved to third floor of the College of Communication building at 640 Commonwealth Avenue in Boston, taking over much of the space vacated by WBUR when it moved to 890 Commonwealth Avenue. Both stations remain in those spaces today.

WTBU air studio in COM, circa 1997 right after moving in

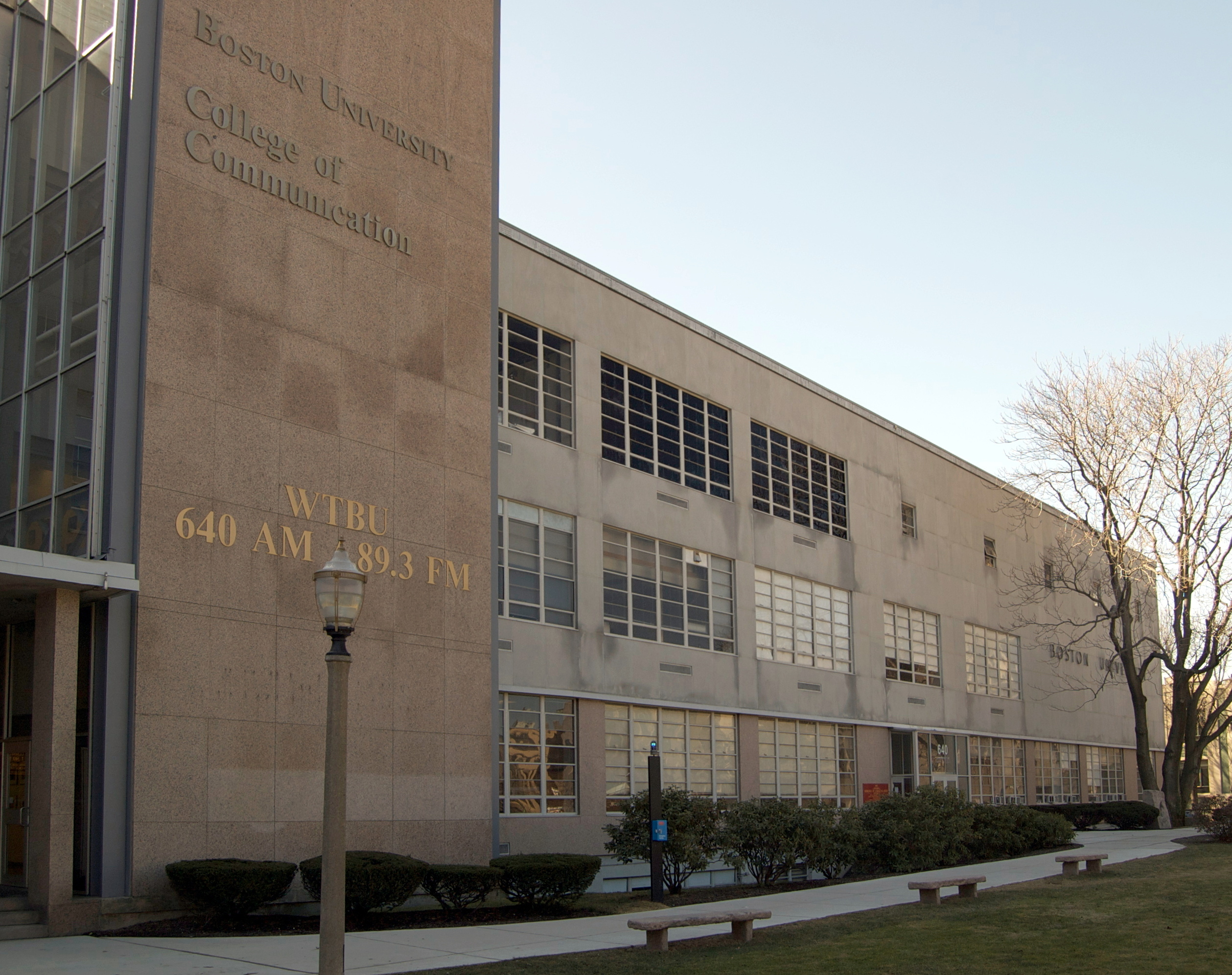
WTBU as advertised on Boston University's Building, 2009

The heyday of WTBU seems to be in the late 1960s and early 1970s. While WBUR was suffering controversy after controversy (in 1964, a long process started of appointing professionals to run WBUR, only to have to fire them and start over again-a process that lasted until the early 1970s). During that time, WTBU enjoyed a significant boost in student attention from displaced WBUR volunteers and overall attention paid to "underground" radio stations by student protesters. As late as 1971 there were articles touting awards WTBU was winning (Station Manager George Schweitzer won the United Press International Broadcast Documentary Award First Prize), special broadcasts they were running (the Distinguished Lecture Series, for example) and being a core member of the "Ivy Network Corporation", a collaboration between WTBU, WZBC, WBRS, WHRB, WTBS, WZLY and WBRU.

At some point in the 1980s, the tradition of "Cram Jams" was formally instituted. This refers to the last week or two of the semester, when finals are being taken. The entire WTBU schedule is revised and DJs tend to play music they feel is especially relevant to test-taking.

In the mid-to-late-1990s there was a general drop in interest in college radio, WTBU included; but by 2000, renewed interest in media in society had brought WTBU back up to near-24/7 broadcasting during the academic year. On Halloween night of 1999, WTBU started streaming on the web as a means of finally reaching both the campus as well as alumni. This drew WTBU national attention when Bill Rigby, the station manager at that time, was featured in the New York Times discussing the station's expansion to online. Today WTBU has over 100 student volunteers every semester.

== Notable alumni ==
WTBU alumni include comedian Jeffrey Ross and radio personality Howard Stern, who attended BU in the mid-1970s. As Stern mentioned in his book Private Parts, WTBU was the first station to fire him. Stern's show,the King Schmaltz Bagel Hour, once aired a segment called "Making the Bishop Blush", in which they pretended a local Catholic bishop was in the studio. They proceeded to make lurid statements and asked if the bishop was blushing yet. Then-Program Director Hank Sennott was listening and fired Stern on the spot.

== Awards ==
WTBU won Station of the Year from CMJ in 2012, 2013 and 2014.

It was nominated for mtvU Woodie Award in 2014 and 2015.

== News operation ==
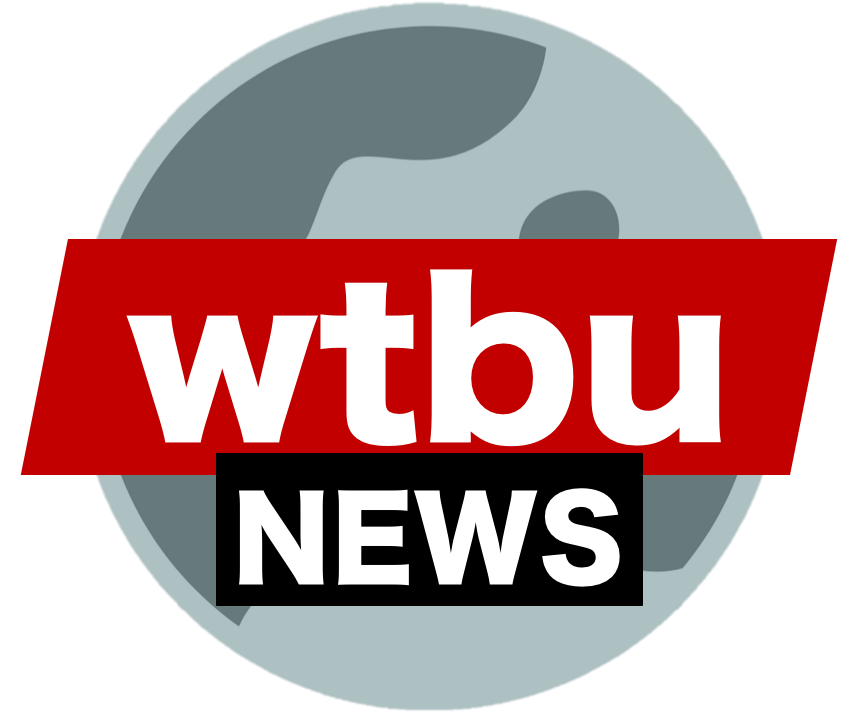
WTBU News Logo

After a three-alarm fire destroyed the WTBU studios in March 2016, a new state-of-the-art studio was built on the third floor of the College of Communication at Boston University. This allows for even more live shows and performances, including WTBU News, the sole news department at WTBU radio.

Immediately after the fire, WTBU's News team was a strong four anchors. In the following four years, the team expanded from four to 56 active staff members as of the 2020 fall semester. Most of this growth came during an international pandemic, as the station turned to remote programming. Instead of four anchors, the team is now composed of producers, editors, associate editors, online media editors, correspondents and reporters, with opportunities for staff to grow into and create new positions.

From March to September 2020, WTBU News produced two weekly shows remotely, including work from reporters around the world, as the team grew from 18 to 56. With so many new reporters, this allowed for more special packages and a restructuring of the show's content.

As of November 2020, WTBU News airs on Tuesday and Thursday nights from 6–8 pm as a mix of both live and remote reporting with proper social distancing and mask wearing. The show includes New England, National, International, Entertainment, Sports news, which have been stalwarts for WTBU News throughout the years. Additionally, WTBU News brings listeners a campus report, highlighting important news and events on BU's campus, an elections/COVID-19 update and an arts and culture update for Boston.

In addition to the twice weekly show on WTBU radio, WTBU News launched a daily news podcast during the pandemic as well. Starting in May 2020, WTBU News Today launched on multiple platforms, including Spotify, Apple Podcasts and Anchor. The podcast is roughly 5 minutes, bringing listeners the day's top headlines.

WTBU News's latest projects include a full night of election coverage on November 3, 2020. Six hours of coverage from 8 pm – 2 am brought listeners updates as polling numbers came in and states were called for either President Trump or former Vice President Joe Biden. The show aired special packages on swing states, key senate races and Massachusetts's polling sites.

Although the show has roots in radio and audio, new staff members created a video team to add visuals to their reporting for the WTBU radio website and WTBU News's social media. The video team is still forming, as the ongoing COVID-19 pandemic limits in-person capabilities.

== Engineering notes ==
WTBU is a Part 15 station, which means that it operates without an FCC license, but within the legal power limits. These limits are the equivalent to about one-tenth of a watt, and unlike antenna-based stations, "carrier current" works on a building-by-building basis – that is, if you are inside, say, Kilachand Hall, you can hear WTBU on 640AM. But walk outside and within 25 ft the signal will disappear.

There are radiating cable FM transmitters (broadcasting at 89.3 MHz) in the Warren Towers and West Campus dormitories, and carrier current transmitters (broadcasting at AM 640 kHz) in the Kilachand Hall, 610 Beacon Street, and Danielsen Hall dormitories, as well as one in the COM building itself.

Since the early-2000s, WTBU also relies on its webcast, and on an audio feed to the campus cable BUTV channel 6, to reach its listeners.

== Relation to WBUR ==
While WBUR-FM is also owned by Boston University, it is an independently operated professional NPR news/talk station. There are a few work-study positions at WBUR-FM and sometimes they are filled by WTBU volunteers, but there is no formal connection between the stations.

== See also ==
- Campus radio
- List of college radio stations in the United States
