= Shelton Hall =

Shelton Hall may refer to:

- Shelton Hall (Boston University), a dormitory at Boston University
- Shelton Hall (England), an estate in Shelton and Hardwick parish, England
