= Welcome Back, Brotter =

Welcome Back, Brotter is a television series broadcast on butv10 on Boston University's campus. The show follows the misadventures of two loser college roommates on the quest for popularity in their big city school.

== Awards ==
Welcome Back, Brotter won a College Emmy in 2013.

It also received a Telly Award in 2012. The 33rd Annual Telly Awards specifically honored the Golden Age of Television-themed episode "Allston All-Nighter."

The show then won the following year in the 34th Annual Telly Awards, taking home the prize for the science fiction-themed episode "Back To The Brotter." The series is the first in the network's history to win two Telly Awards in two consecutive years.

11Creative Productions, which produces the show, also won the Grand Prize in the 2009 Boston University "Your Take" Short Film Festival while Brotter won the 2011 Boston University's Funniest Student competition.

== Show format ==
Each episode parodies a different visual and narrative style. Such formats have included mockumentary filmmaking, action parodies, in-studio informercials, voice-over narration, and laugh tracks.

There is usually a cold open. The theme song, "Oh, Brotter," which plays the opening and closing credits, is written and performed by Brian Engles.

== Show history ==
Welcome Back, Brotter is produced by 11C Productions. The company's name derives from the place where the producers met: 11C, the College of Communication floor (Floor 11) of Warren Towers' Shields Tower (Tower C).

In 2009, when 11C Productions was founded, the production company started producing Welcome Back as a webseries. Ryan came up with the idea for the pilot after recognizing that Brotter's last name rhymed with the popular show Welcome Back, Kotter. The first webisode was co-written, directed, and edited by John Sanderson.

In 2011, the three became Executive Producers when buTV10 picked up the webseries as a televised production. Equipped with more than 20 Production Assistants, the show currently airs on-campus on Channel 10, which reaches nearly 30,000 students and 10,000 faculty members. All episodes and satirical promos are also available and free online.

== Press ==
The television debut of Welcome Back, Brotter was the subject of an article in BU Today by New York Times Magazine writer Susan Segilson. Bostonia magazine selected the feature as one of their Web Exclusives.

Welcome Back, Brotter was also the subject of articles in The Daily Free Press in 2009, The Quad in 2010, and Boston.com in 2013.
