= Boston University Housing System =

Housing system for Boston University

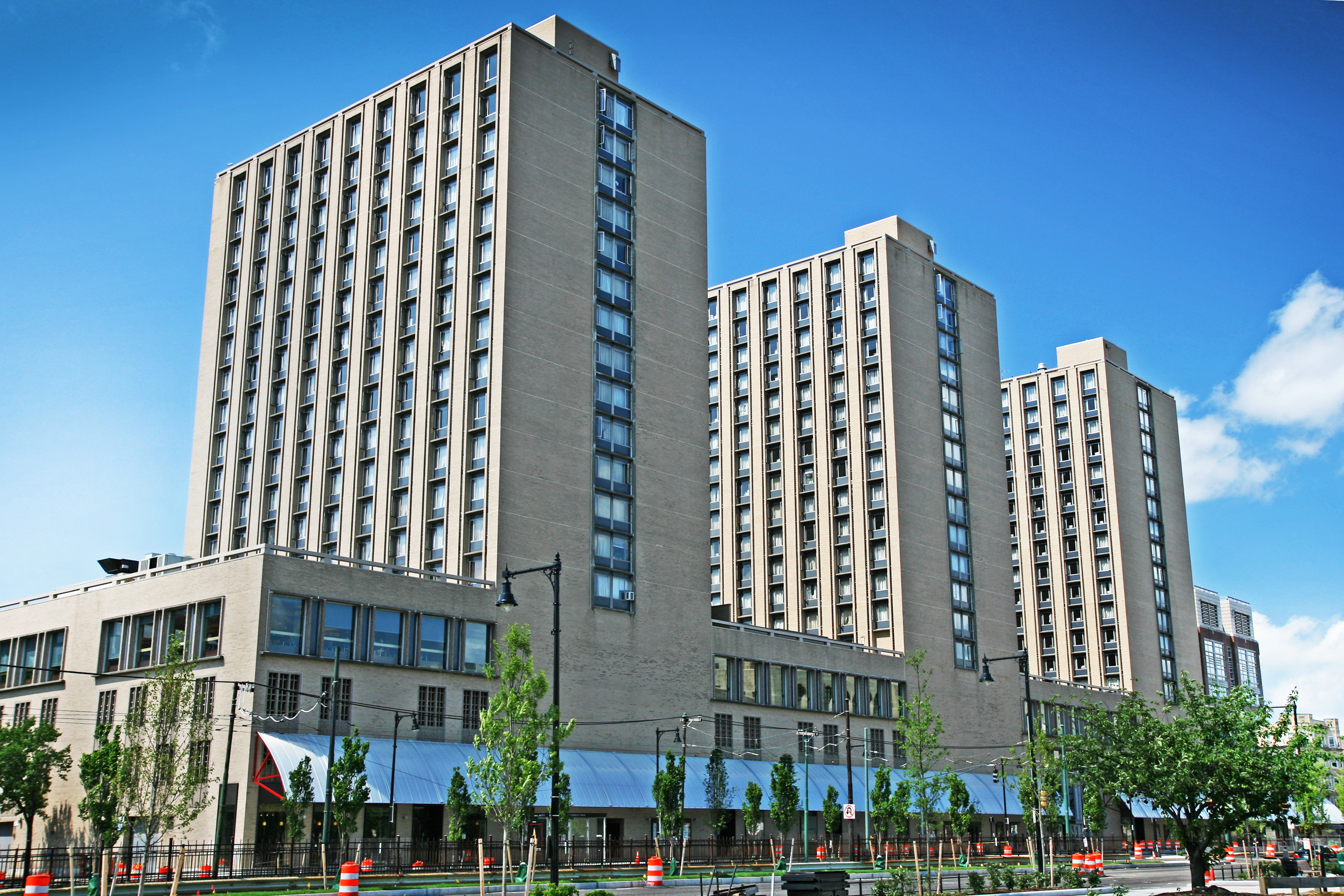
Seen here from Commonwealth Avenue, Warren Towers constitutes the second-largest non-military dorm in the country.

The Boston University housing system is the 2nd-largest of any private university in the United States, with 76% of the undergraduate population living on campus. On-campus housing at BU is an unusually diverse melange, ranging from individual 19th-century brownstone town houses and apartment buildings acquired by the school to large-scale high-rises built in the 60s and 2000s.

Though originally a commuter school, the University now guarantees the option of on-campus housing for four years for all undergraduate students. This is a challenge considering the size of BU's undergraduate population and its urban setting. BU has met this goal every year, often by using area hotels, though since fall 2009, with the completion of its new 960-bed 26-story dorm, the school says it has accommodated all students who wish to live on campus without using hotel space.

== Housing versus Residence Life ==
Boston University operates residences collaboratively through Residence Life and Housing. While the two areas work collaboratively, each department reports to different areas of University leadership. Housing reports to the Vice President of Auxiliary Services and is centered on providing operational and occupancy management. Meanwhile, Residence Life is structured under the Associate Provost and Dean of Students and is centered on providing day-to-day student service, support, and programs based out of local Residence Life offices located near or within each residence.

=== Housing ===
Boston University Housing is based at 25 Buick Street, and employs a number of full and part-time staff, as well as students who manage the many components that support Housing at Boston University.

Housing is responsible for the areas of Residential Safety, housing assignments, room changes, mail, keys (in coordination with local Residence Life offices), university-provided furnishings, appliances in university-owned residences, and the Terrier Card Office. Boston University Housing also works collaboratively with other departments across campus, such as Facilities Management & Planning, and within Auxiliary Services to coordinate laundry, vending, rentals, summer storage, dining services, vending services, and events & conferences.

=== Residence life ===
The Residence Life team delivers a range of programs and services to students, including specialty communities, Residence Hall Associations, the Faculty-in-Residence program, crisis intervention, conflict mediation, enforcement of residential rules and regulations, and information about campus resources.

Residence Life is one of the few departments at the University with an on-call system that allows staff to be available to assist students, parents, and members of the University community 24 hours a day, seven days a week, and 365 days a year.

==== Live-in professional staff ====
Residence Life employs 27 live-in workers at the "administrator" and "senior staff" level in the following roles:

- Assistant Dean of Students and Director of Residence Life
- Senior Associate Director of Residence Life
- Associate Director of Residence Life for Administration
- Associate Director of Residence Life for Student and Staff Development
- Assistant Director of Residence Life for Lower Bay State Road
- Assistant Director of Residence Life for South Campus
- Assistant Director of Residence Life for Upper Bay State Road
- Assistant Director of Residence Life for Upper Commonwealth Avenue
- Assistant Director of Residence Life for Warren Towers
- Assistant Director of Residence Life for West Campus
- Residence Hall or Area Directors

== Housing selection ==
Every spring, returning students who have submitted a housing guarantee payment for the ensuing academic year are entered into a lottery to determine their priority in selecting housing. Priority is assigned within classes, with seniors receiving the lowest (best) numbers, and second-semester freshmen the highest. This means the "worst" senior number is always better than the best junior number, etcetera. Entering freshmen and transfer students are allocated housing based on an online housing questionnaire.

== Dining services ==
Boston University requires that all students living in dormitories be enrolled in a year-long meal plan. These meal plans are optional for residents of on-campus apartments. The plans offer differing ratios of meals and dining points, depending on which one is chosen. Meals are used to gain access to one of the university's three residential dining service locations at West Campus, Warren Towers and Marciano Commons on an all-you-can-eat basis, and dining points can be used at designated eateries around campus on a cash basis. A Kosher plan exists which can be used at the Kosher dining hall at Granby Commons.

== Large dormitories ==
=== 610 Beacon Street ===
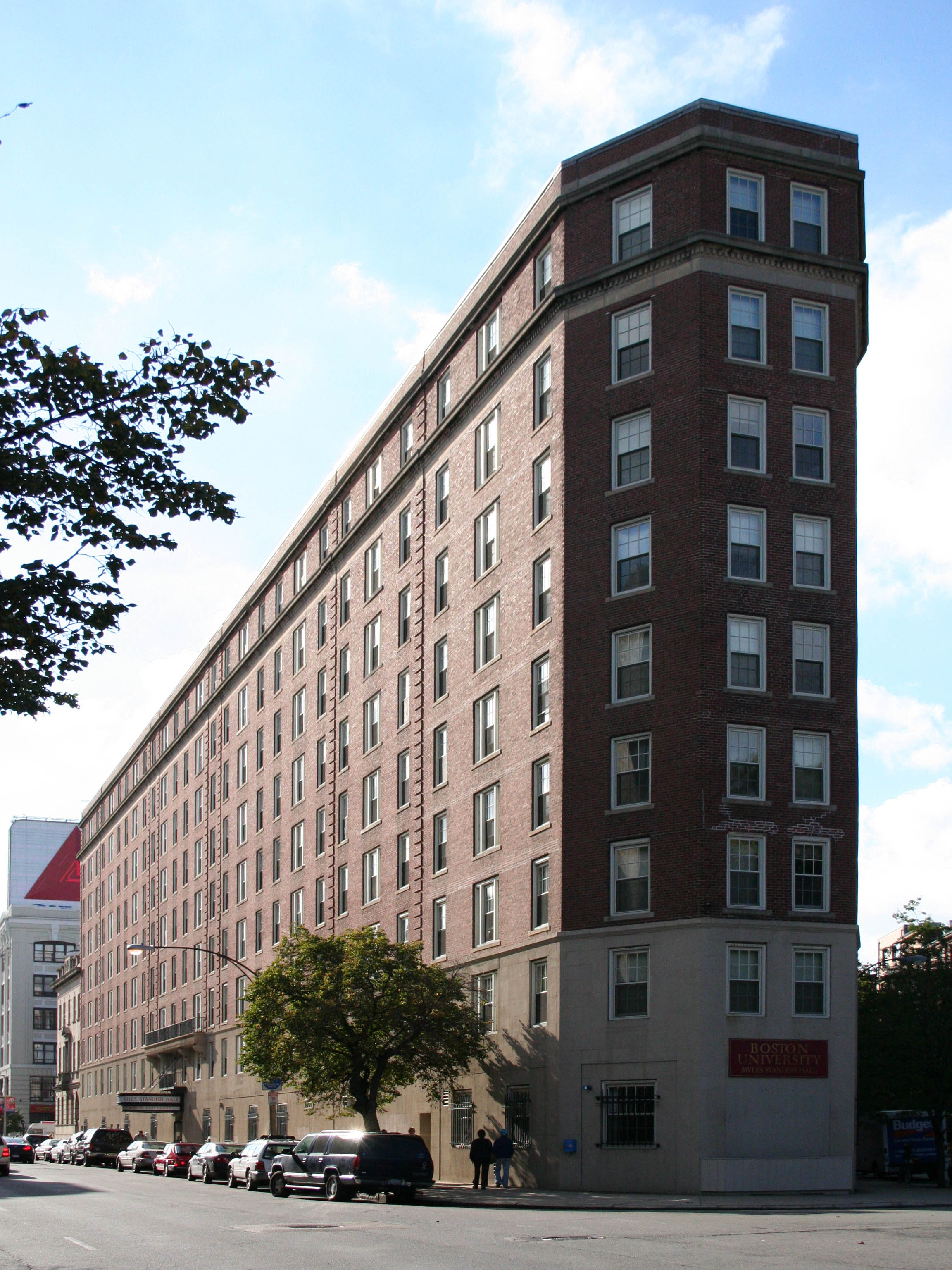
610 Beacon Street, formerly known as and still referred to as Myles Standish Hall

BU's first large dormitory was a former hotel. The Myles Standish Hotel in Kenmore Square was built in 1925 and was purchased by BU in 1949. Today Myles Standish Hall and the attached Myles Annex (a separate building purchased for housing in 1980 after the closure of Graham Junior College) together house over 730 students. A 2018 renovation permanently connected Myles Annex to the main part of Myles Standish Hall.

Myles is configured as a semi-suite residence. The typical suite consists of 2 single rooms and 1 double occupancy room sharing a bathroom. Common areas include group study rooms, music practice rooms, a community kitchen and a games room.

In 2021, the Massachusett Tribe at Ponkapoag requested Boston University to rename Myles Standish Hall to "Wituwamat Memorial Hall", after a leading Native American figure massacred by Myles Standish. President Robert A. Brown rejected this request due to the historic significance of the name. However, in May 2024, the Myles Standish name was removed, and the building was officially renamed "610 Beacon Street" after its address.

=== Kilachand Hall ===
Kilachand Hall, previously named Shelton Hall, was built as a Sheraton Hotels and Resorts-branded hotel in 1923 and bought by BU and converted to dorm space in 1954. Playwright Eugene O'Neill died in suite 401 on the 4th floor of Kilachand Hall. In his honor, the 4th floor was named a specialty housing area called the Writer's Corridor. It is said that this corridor is haunted by the playwright. The building houses 418 residents. The ninth floor consists of a study lounge that provides an impressive view of Cambridge and the Charles River. The Kilachand Hall dining hall was closed after the 2011–2012 year when a larger dining hall called Marciano Commons opened across the street.

=== Towers ===
The Towers is one of the three Boston University dormitories traditionally intended for freshmen and sophomores, the others being Warren Towers and West Campus. The building comprises two towers, each nine floors high and linked at ground level by a single story structure housing common facilities. It is located on the eastern end of campus, next to Wheelock College of Education and Human Development and behind the Questrom School of Business. It appeared in the movie 21 as the dormitory which housed MIT student Ben Campbell (Jim Sturgess).

=== Warren Towers ===
Warren Towers is the largest dorm on campus, housing roughly 600 students in each of its three towers. Access to the building is via escalator to the fourth floor, where the building's dining hall and other amenities are located. Floors 5–18 are residential floors. The first three floors and basement house a university parking garage and street-level retail establishments.

Warren Towers is a mostly first-year student residence, though there is also significant retention of sophomores. The majority of rooms are double-occupancy with identical floor plans. Additional room types include single-occupancy rooms, quadruple-occupancy rooms, and a second type of double-occupancy room with a floor plan that is almost twice the size of a standard double room.

=== West Campus ===
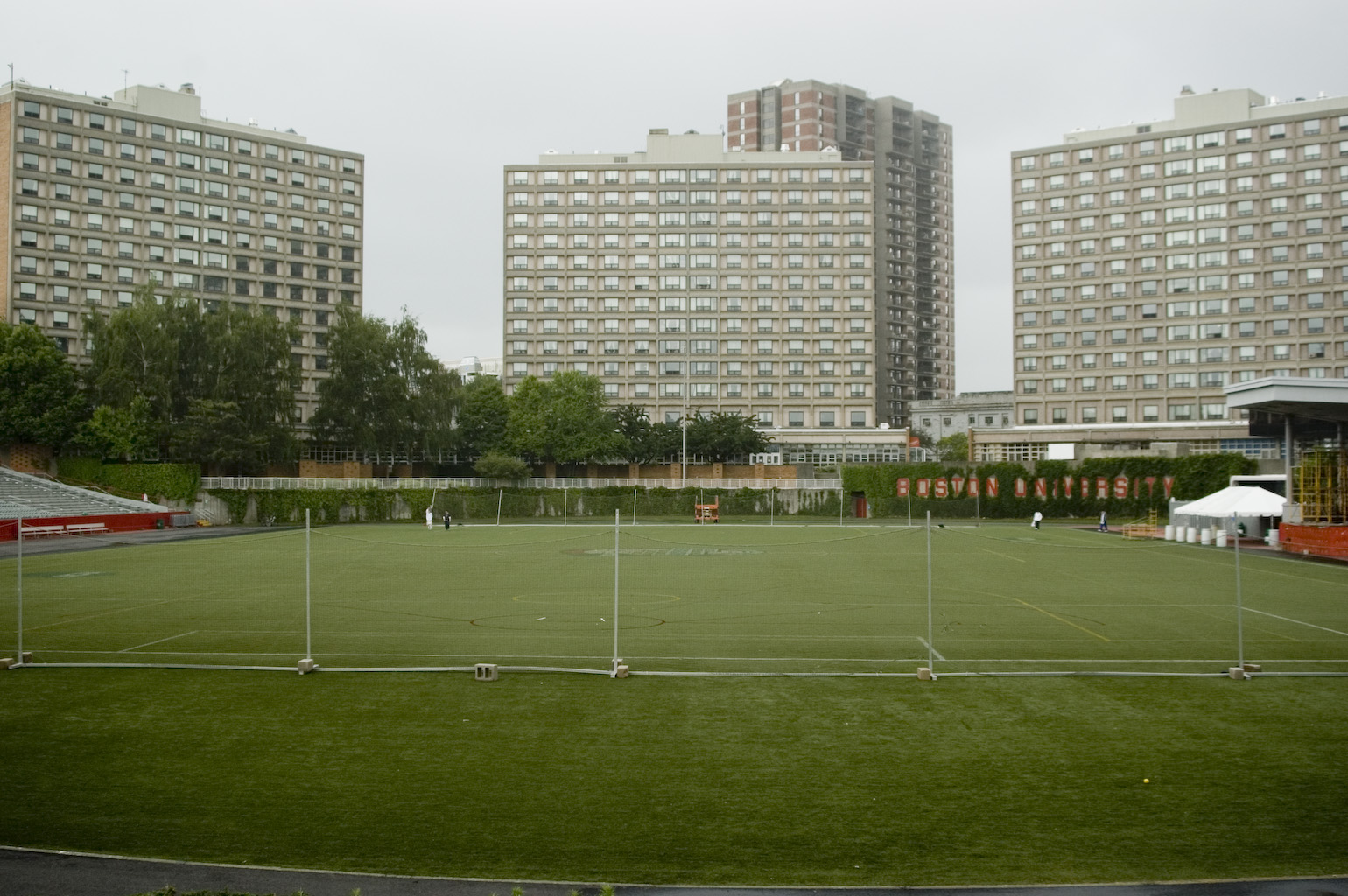
West Campus' three high-rise dorms overlook Nickerson Field.

At the western edge of campus surrounding BU's Nickerson Field is West Campus, with three high-rises each housing well over 600 residents. They are named Claflin, Sleeper, and Rich Hall after BU's founders. Residents of West generally prefer it over other locations and cite its "campusy" feel and proximity to the Student Village complex and other athletic facilities. Student athletes are abundant here, for that reason. CGS, CFA, and SHA students also tend to prefer living at West Campus, as it is the closest dormitory style residence to those three schools.

All the buildings provide students with a study room.

=== Danielsen Hall ===
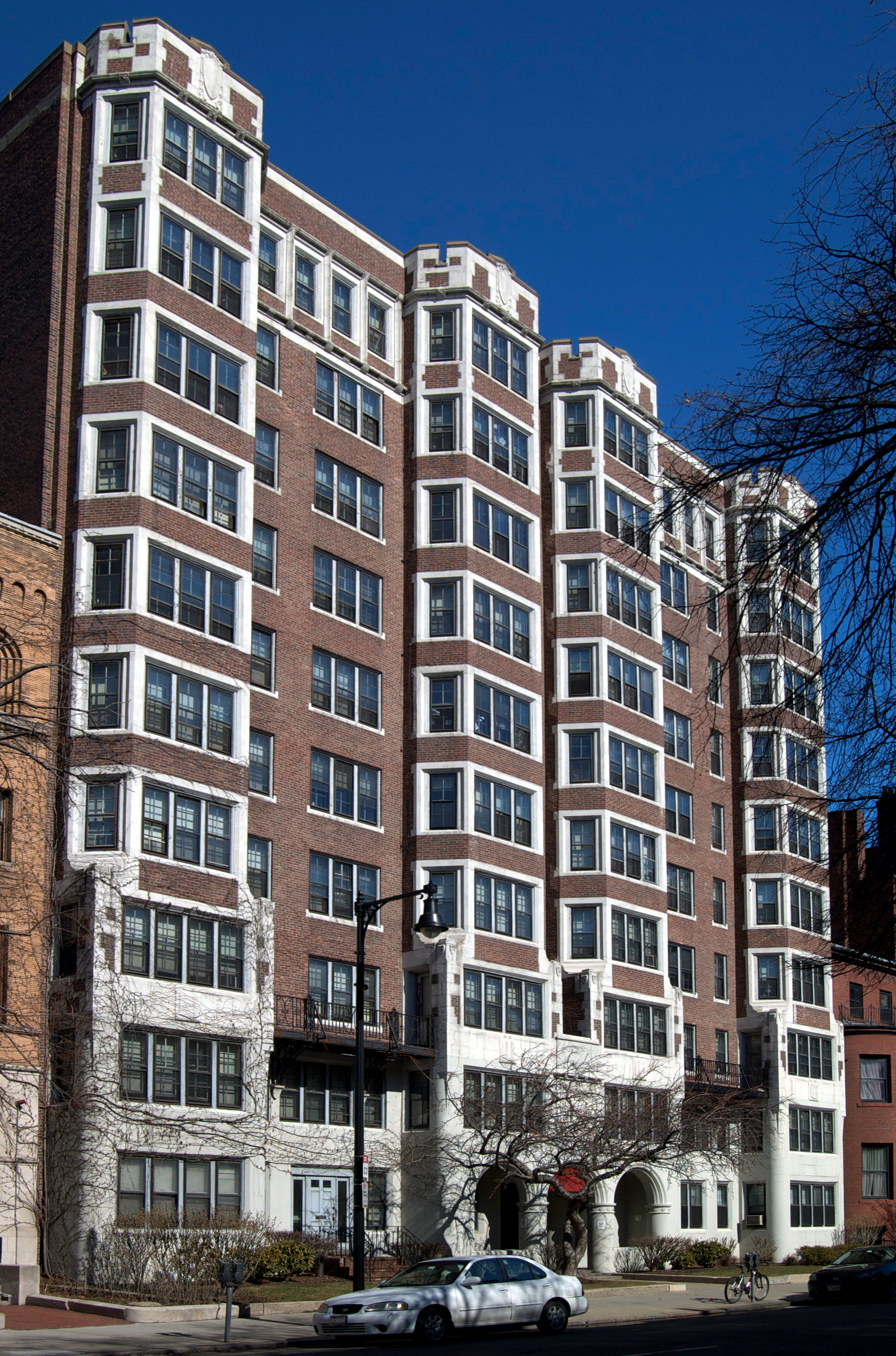
Danielson Hall on Beacon Street

Often forgotten, Danielsen Hall actually demarcates the BU campus’ easternmost limit, at its 512 Beacon Street address. Danielsen residents eat at Marciano Commons, or another dining location. However, the dorm does have a kitchen located in the basement. Danielsen, while a bit of a distance from central campus, has the advantage of being closer to the city. Newbury Street, for example is just a few blocks away. The Boston University Shuttle (BUS) picks up in front of Danielsen regularly, making the distance to campus much more tolerable.

== Small dormitories, apartments, and suite style ==
=== Bay State Road ===
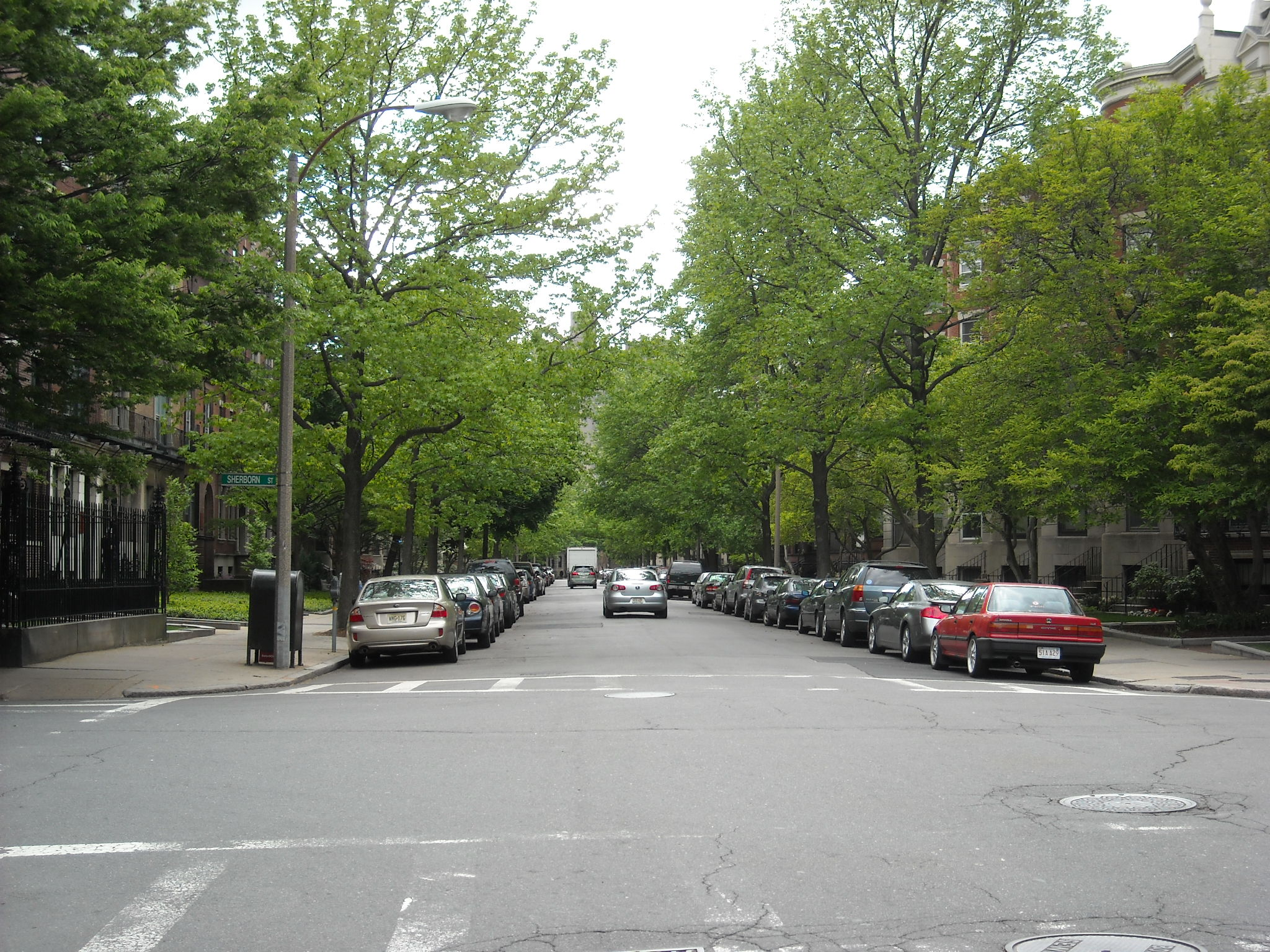
Bay State Road is now primarily BU student housing.

Once an up-and-coming neighborhood of affluent Boston Brahmins, the majority of Bay State Road is now owned by Boston University for housing and office use. Due to their small size, the brownstones on Bay State are inherently suited for use as specialty housing, and many are used in this fashion.

When used as a dormitory, most of the Bay State Road residences are divided into double and triple rooms with some singles. Floors also consist of less than 10 students. Most houses have floors that share a bathroom, a room for the resident assistant on the ground floor, and laundry facilities in the basement. Some rooms have private bathrooms. While some of the houses are rather well-worn, BU has undertaken a project that each summer renovates selected residences to restore the Bay State Road houses to their 19th-century appearance and ambience.

=== South Campus ===
South Campus is a student residential area south of Commonwealth Avenue and separated from the main campus by the Massachusetts Turnpike. Some of the larger buildings in that area have been converted into dormitories, while the rest of the South campus buildings are apartments. All were originally constructed as commercial apartment buildings and later purchased by the University. Aside from the characteristic red plaques at their entrances, South Campus buildings are indistinguishable from the other private residences in the area. Since there are no central dining facilities in the South Campus area, students from these dormitories can dine at Warren Towers or other facilities on the main campus.

=== 10 Buick Street ===
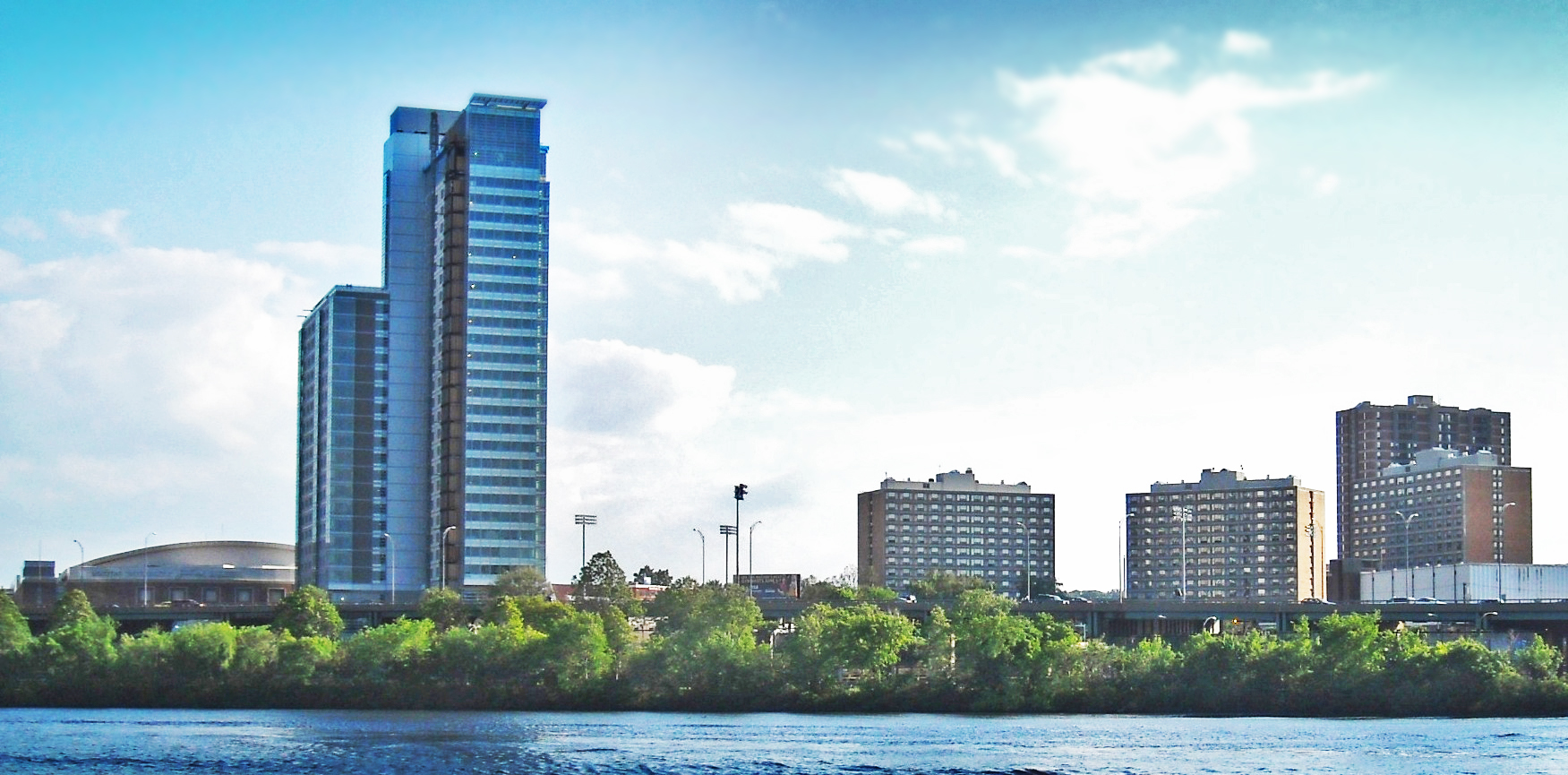
The 2008 26-story tower of Student Village juxtaposed to the 1960s dorms of West Campus

Boston University's principal apartment-style housing area is officially called 10 Buick Street, a part of the John Hancock Student Village project which includes the adjacent Fitness and Recreation Center and the Agganis Arena. Students most commonly refer to this residence as the "Student Village", or "StuVi" (pronounced stoo-vee) for short. The apartments at 10 Buick Street are open to juniors and seniors only, and house more than 800 students in apartments. Each apartment has either two or four private bedrooms, one or two common bathrooms (one for doubles, two for quads), a common living room, and a common kitchen.

The building has two towers that are connected up to the ninth floor and rise separately to 18 floors in West Tower and 15 floors in East tower. The West Tower has apartments on floors 1–17, the 18th floor is the Student Atrium with views of Boston and the Charles River. The East Tower has residences on floors 2–15, with the 1st floor being a marketplace. The 10 Buick Street Market and Cafe has a soup & salad bar, a small selection of household items, drinks and snacks, as well as sandwiches and bagels. The basement has a laundry, mailboxes, a study lounge, as well as study and music rooms.

In 2003, the director of the student village began publishing a monthly newsletter for residents called The Villager. In 2004, the publication was redesigned to include recipes, a quiz, and an advice column. Since August 2004, The Villager has been printed bi-weekly. Ten Buick Street is the only on-campus residence at Boston University to feature a publication of this type.

=== 33 Harry Agganis Way ===
Boston University's newest residence, which opened in the fall of 2009, accommodates 960 residents in two towers. The 26-story tower houses juniors and seniors in an apartment-style setting. These apartments are two-bedroom apartments for two students, or four-bedroom apartments for four students. All apartments have one bathroom, one living room, and one kitchen. The 19-story tower houses sophomores, juniors and seniors residing in suite (dormitory-style) settings. The suites house eight students each; half of the residents reside in four single bedrooms, while the other half occupy two double bedrooms. Each suite has two bathrooms and one living room.

=== 1019 Commonwealth Avenue ===
Located across the street from West Campus, 1019 is suite-style housing without kitchens. Thus, residents eat at the West Campus dining hall. The suites have three double rooms which share a bathroom and common room. During the summer, Boston University sometimes uses 1019 as temporary lodging for conference attendees and other visitors.

=== Fenway Campus ===
Boston University's Fenway Campus is located in the Riverway area near South Campus. The campus is composed of multiple undergraduate and graduate residences: Riverway House, Pilgrim House, and Campus Center & Student Residence. These residences include dorm-style and suite-style rooms with single, double, triple, and quadruple occupancy. They also offer study lounges, laundry rooms, vending machines, internet access, and a dining hall (located at Campus Center Student Residence). Fenway campus was integrated into Boston University after a merger between Boston University and Wheelock College in 2018.

== Other housing locations ==
Aside from these main residential areas, smaller residential dormitories are scattered along Commonwealth Avenue between main school buildings, including 722-728 Commonwealth Avenue, located across from CVS on St. Mary's street.

=== Hotels: The Hyatt and Holiday Inn Brookline ===
Due to housing capacity shortages, many incoming students are temporarily housed in hotels during the fall semester. These hotels include the Hyatt Regency in Cambridge on the opposite bank of the Charles, and the Holiday Inn in Brookline, both a manageable walk to main campus with free shuttle bus service provided to students in the Hyatt.

=== 575 Commonwealth Avenue ===
One of the hotels frequently used in this way was the former Howard Johnson's hotel at 575 Commonwealth Avenue, next to the Questrom School of Business' Rafik Hariri Building. In 2001, the University closed the hotel (which it owned) and converted the building into a full-time dormitory, now known as 575 Commonwealth Avenue. Rooms are commonly divided into triples, although there are a few doubles and singles. Every room comes with its own bathroom and air conditioning, a luxury not present in most rooms on campus. This 8-story building, not including the basement, includes the first floor lobby, 6 floors for bedroom dorms, and an eight floor study area. The first floor lobby also has two lounge areas, where students can choose to study or hang out by playing pool or watching TV. Students lovingly refer to it as either 575 or the HoJo.

== Capacity problems ==
Between 2002 and 2008, The University was criticized for overbooking its housing for the fall semester as a result of its large student population and its guarantee of on-campus housing for four years. As a result, many freshmen were moved to nearby hotels to accommodate the overflow. BU's Daily Free Press published several articles relating to the university's inability to provide "acceptable housing" for its students. With the opening of StuVi-II in Fall 2009, the school's 960-bed 19 and 26 story towers, BU said it would be able to house the nearly 80 percent of its 16,000 undergraduates who want to live on campus without using hotels.

In the past, the Boston University Office of Housing was criticized for reserving a certain percentage of each dormitory for underclasses. This caused complaints from upperclassmen who were relegated to living in substandard housing due to spots in prime housing being taken by freshmen and sophomores, squeezing the upperclassmen out of the already crowded, at the time, housing system. Additionally, some freshmen placed into predominantly upperclassmen dorms are unsatisfied with their assignments because of the difficulty of engaging with other underclassmen in these locations.
