= List of radio stations in Greater Boston =

The Greater Boston Area is currently the tenth-largest radio market in the United States. While most stations originate in Boston, other stations in this list includes stations like Greenfield, but still serving under the name.

== Broadcast radio ==
=== AM Stations ===
Call sign	Frequency	Location	Format	Brand Name	Language	Affiliation/Owner
WEZE	590	Boston	Christian radio	590 AM The Word	English	Salem Radio Network/Salem Media Group (Salem Communications Holding Corporation)
WTBU	640	Boston Universitycampus	Music/Sports/News	WTBU	English	Boston University College of Communication
WRKO	680	Boston	News/talk	WRKO AM 680	English	ABC News Radio, Compass Media Networks, Premiere Networks, Total Traffic and Weather Network/iHeartMedia
