= Delaina Dixon =

American entertainment journalist

- Education: Boston University; College of Communication
- Occupation(s): Entertainment journalist Television host

Delaina Dixon is an entertainment journalist and television host. She was a co-host of VH1's morning show The Gossip Table and is the editor-in-chief of the entertainment and lifestyle website DivaGalsDaily.com.

== Education ==
Dixon attended Boston University's College of Communication, where she co-created the long-running student-run drama series Bay State.

== Career ==
The editor-in-chief and a contributing columnist to DivaGalsDaily.com, Dixon was previously Entertainment Editor for OK! magazine in the US and wrote for TV Guide online.

The Gossip Table debuted on June 3, 2013, with Dixon as one of five entertainment columnists presenting entertainment news and gossip. In May 2013 TGT executive producer Shane Farley called Dixon and her four co-hosts "the best in the business."

In October 2013, Jet magazine announced a collaboration with Dixon in which she and her staff at DivaGalsDaily.com would be regular contributors to the magazine's website, JETMag.com.
