= Chloe Melas =

American journalist

Chloe Elizabeth Melas
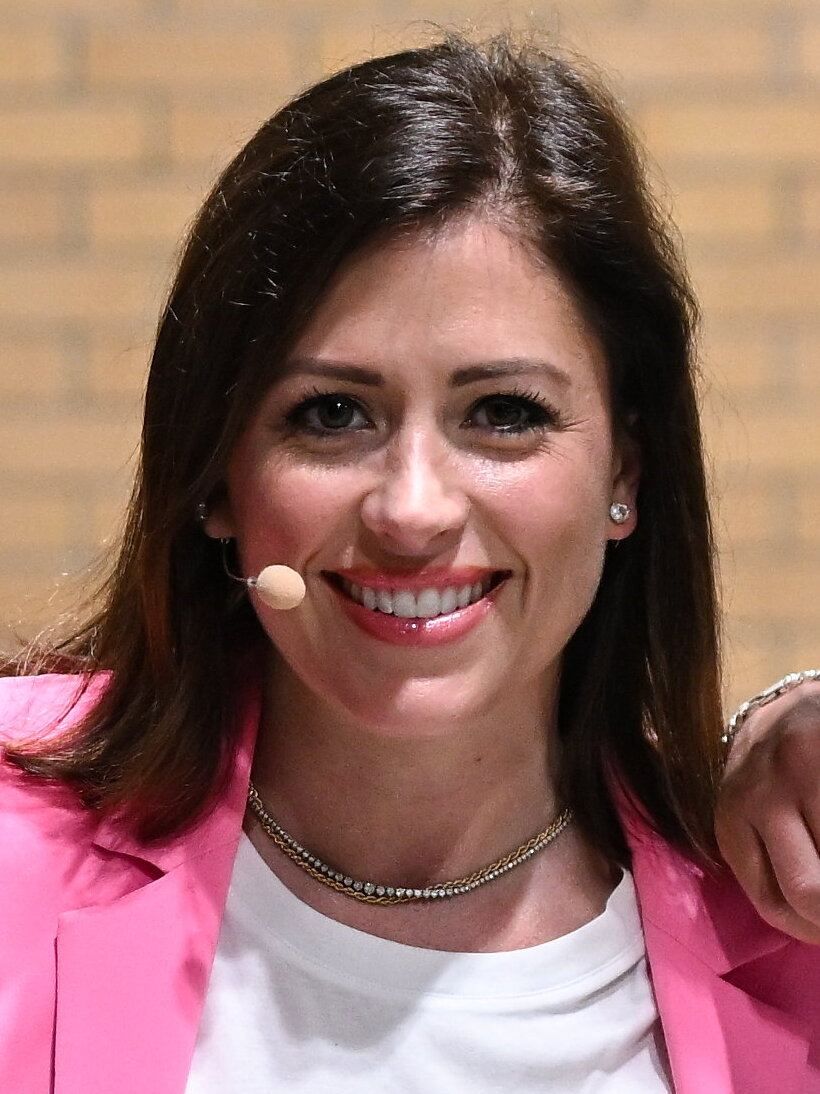
- Melas in 2024
- Education: Auburn University
- Occupation: Journalist
- Employer: NBC News
- Spouse: Brian Mazza
- Children: 2

Chloe Elizabeth Melas is an American journalist currently serving as an entertainment correspondent for NBC. She was previously a reporter for CNN from 2016 to 2023. Prior to her time at CNN, she was the senior entertainment reporter for Hollywood Life and the host of VH1's morning TV show The Gossip Table. In 2018, she faced a backlash after accusing Morgan Freeman of sexual misconduct; her accusations are disputed.

== Education ==
Melas graduated from Auburn University in 2008 with a degree in radio, television and film.

== Journalism career ==
Melas began her career at CNN as a news assistant. She left in 2009 after meeting editor Bonnie Fuller, helping her launch Hollywood Life. Melas eventually became the site's senior entertainment reporter. In 2010, she hosted her own weekend entertainment segment on New York City's WNYW television station. In 2011, she also became the host of Penske Media Corporation's ENTV, where she filmed spots for ION, Yahoo!, and Vodafone.

In 2013, Melas became one of the hosts of VH1's morning show The Gossip Table. The show ran for four seasons until it was cancelled in September 2015.

In 2014, Melas joined the New York City television station WPIX as its weekly Hot List contributor, where she discussed the biggest entertainment news of the week every Friday morning. Melas has been a contributor on Fox & Friends, HLN, The Wendy Williams Show, The Insider, The Today Show, and elsewhere.

In 2015, Melas became the brand ambassador for women's clothing line Maggy London.

In 2023, Melas published her late grandfather's WWII memoir, Luck of the Draw which became a New York Times bestseller in its first week.

On August 16, 2023, Melas announced that she had left CNN and was joining NBC.

=== Reporting on Morgan Freeman ===
In 2017, Melas covered a publicity event for the film Going in Style, starring Morgan Freeman. Melas claimed that Freeman made several inappropriate remarks to her. She reported this to CNN, which informed a third-party investigation division via the Warner Brothers human resources department; Time Warner could not corroborate her account and CNN's own HR department which investigated her complaint found that it was "not supported by the facts". Melas "heard rumblings about Mr. Freeman's behavior with other women" and decided to pursue the story.

On May 24, 2018, Melas and CNN media and entertainment deputy editor An Phung reported that eight people said they had experienced harassment or inappropriate behavior from Freeman. Subsequently, Melas said on air that she was sexually harassed by Freeman and showed a clip of him alongside co-stars Michael Caine and Alan Arkin. She said Freeman's comment, "Boy, do I wish I was there", was directed at her; he said it was made in response to a story Caine was telling. Freeman responded in a statement the same day, "Anyone who knows me or has worked with me knows I am not someone who would intentionally offend or knowingly make anyone feel uneasy. I apologize to anyone who felt uncomfortable or disrespected — that was never my intent." Tyra Martin, who was named in Melas' report, later said that she should not have been: "I'm sorry for anyone who's had an unfortunate experience or feels harassed or assaulted. That wasn't my experience with Morgan Freeman."

Following continued news coverage, Freeman's attorney wrote to CNN president Jeff Zucker asking for a retraction and apology, saying the reporting was false and lacked editorial control due to one of the reporters, Melas, herself being an alleged victim; they said she induced the alleged witnesses to make claims. CNN said those claims were unfounded and stood by its reporting, saying they would continue covering the story. Melas received death threats following her reporting on Freeman according to CNN's General Counsel, David Vigilante.

== Personal life ==
In late 2012, Melas met New York City restaurateur Brian Mazza. They were married in New York City on October 25, 2014. In 2017, the couple had a son, a second son was born in July 2019. Both children were conceived with the use of in vitro fertilisation due to a diagnosis of poor ovarian reserve and low sperm count.

Melas is the granddaughter of noted navigator of the 100th Bomb Group, Frank Murphy. She wrote the foreword of his published book, Luck of the Draw. He is portrayed in Steven Spielberg's Masters of the Air.

Melas has ulcerative colitis.
