= Isaac Rich =

American businessman and philanthropist (1801–1872)

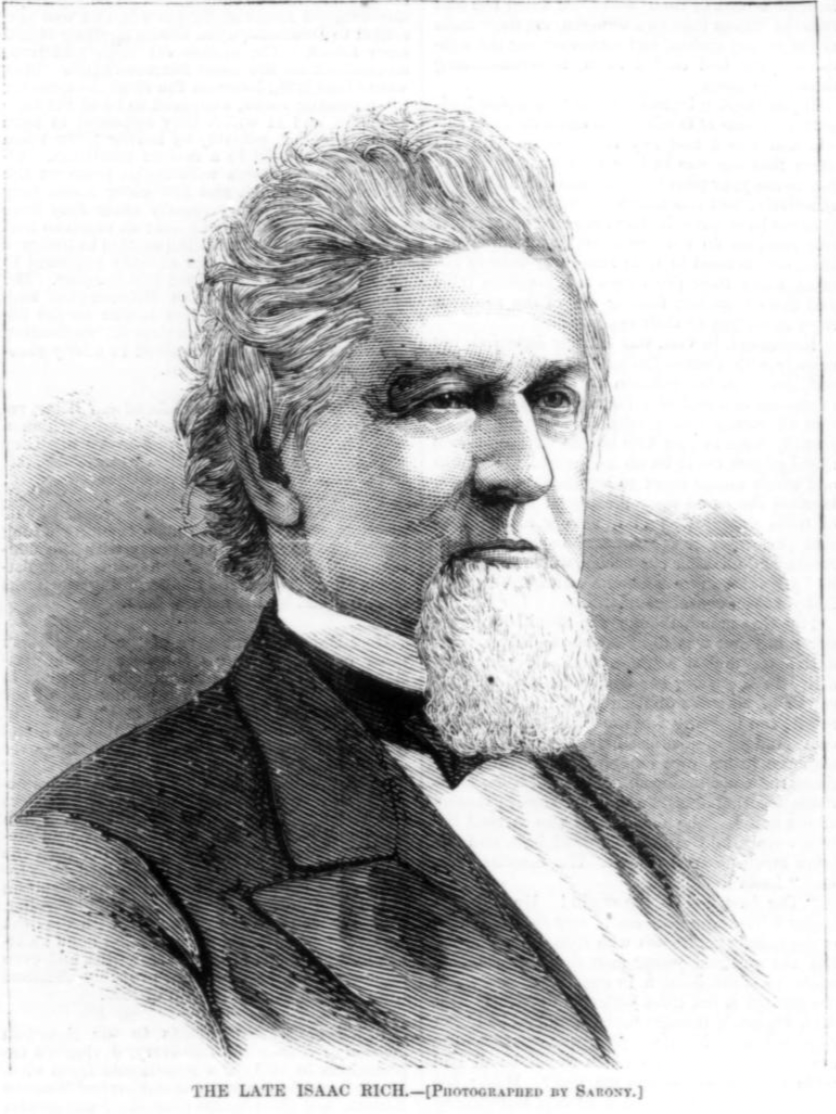
- Born: October 24, 1801; Wellfleet, Massachusetts
- Died: January 13, 1872 (aged 70); Boston, Massachusetts
- Spouse: Sarah Rich (m. 1822)

Isaac Rich (October 24, 1801 – January 13, 1872) was a prominent Boston merchant and philanthropist.

== Biography ==
Born in Wellfleet, Massachusetts to a poor family his father died when he was young. At the age of 14 he went to Boston where he assisted his father selling fish. Upon his fathers death he opened an oyster stall at Faneuil Hall. He was given a loan by the proprietor of the Tremont Hotel allowing him to expand his seafood business into salmon. He purchased a number of fishing vessels and expanded his business considerably in the following decades.

Rich expanded into shipping, warehousing, the dry goods business, and banking. He made a considerable fortune and became a millionaire. Rich died on January 13, 1872 after a period of illness lasting a few weeks. Rich was buried at the Mount Auburn Cemetery.

Rich joined the Methodist Episcopal Church at a young age. He was an active member of the North Bennet Street congregation.

== Philanthropy ==
Rich made significant contributions to charity. Of note was his donation of 10,000 dollars to Wesleyan University for the construction of a Rich Hall, originally a library but now the '92 theater. Rich additionally gave 100,000 dollars at the request of College Founder Wilbur Fisk Rich left the majority of his estate, estimated to be worth 1.7 million dollars at the time, to Boston University. Rich Hall on the University's West Campus is named in his honor.
