= Warren Towers =

Boston University dormitory

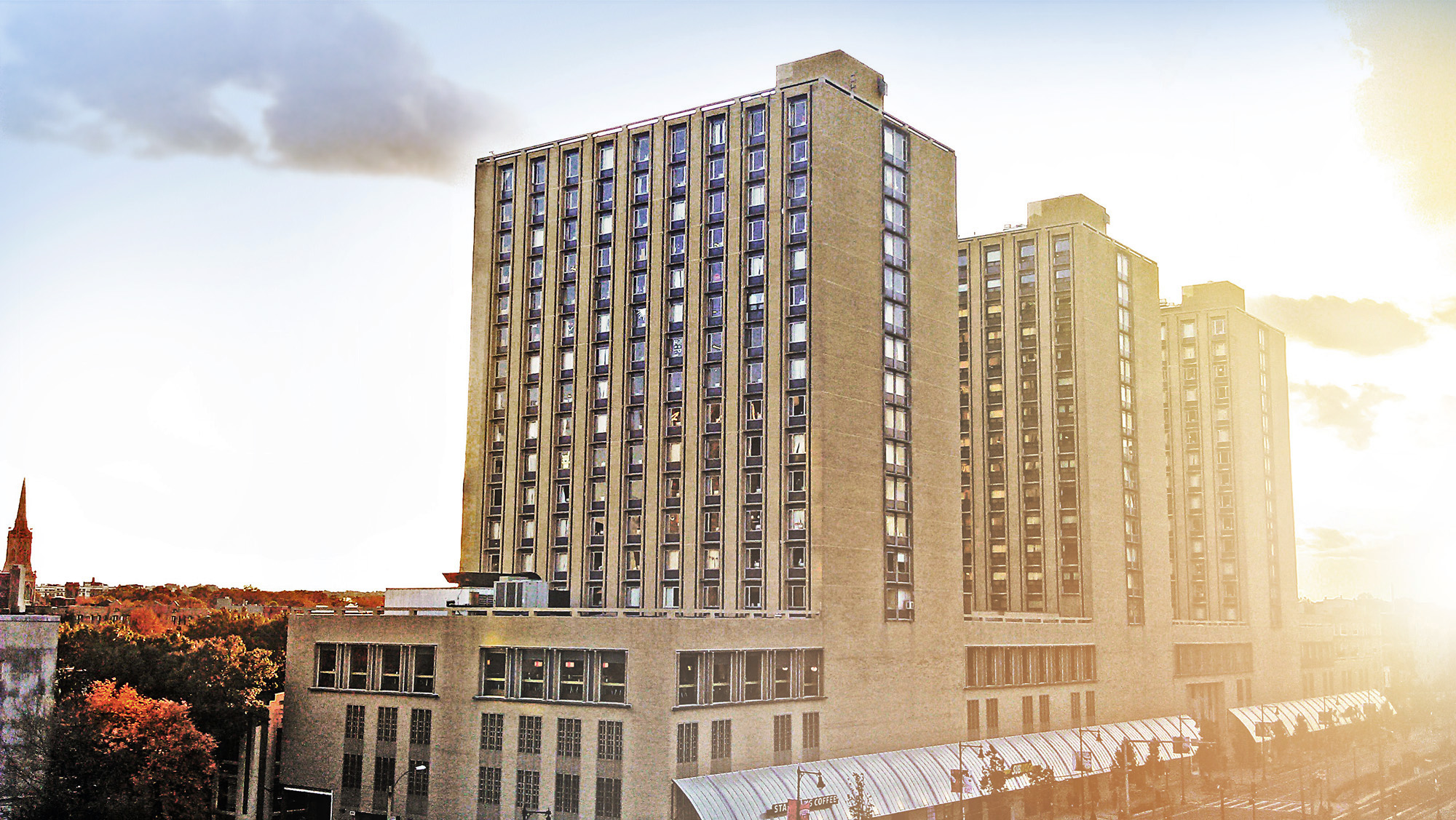
- Warren Towers during sunset.

General information
- Type: Dormitory
- Location: 700 Commonwealth Avenue; Boston, Suffolk County, Massachusetts 02215; United States
- Coordinates: 42°20.945′N 71°6.215′W
- Completed: 1967
- Owner: Boston University

Technical details
- Floor count: 18

Website
- www.bu.edu/housing/residences/largedorms/warren

Warren Towers is one of the three Boston University dormitories traditionally intended for underclassmen, the others being The Towers and West Campus. The building is located at central campus, next to the College of Communication (COM) and across from the College of Arts and Sciences (CAS). Housing approximately 1800 students, it is the second-largest non-military dormitory in the country, behind Jester Center at The University of Texas at Austin. The closest MBTA stop is Boston University East on the Green Line B branch, located directly in front of B and C Towers, in a center reservation on Commonwealth Avenue.

== Name ==
=== Original name ===
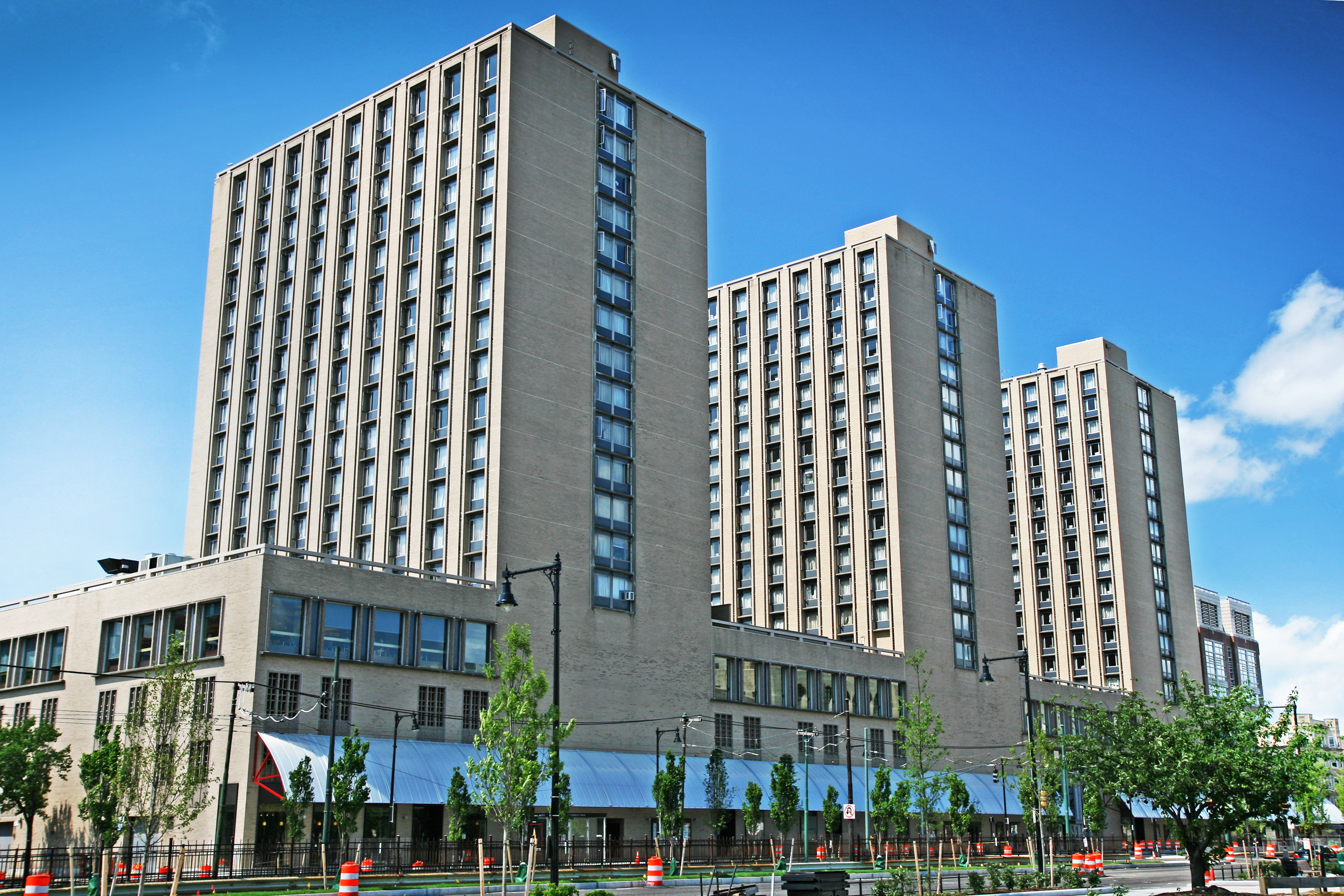
Warren Towers

Originally, the building's name was simply "700", in reference to its 700 Commonwealth Avenue address. Its three towers were simply called, from east to west (left to right in the above photo), A Tower, B Tower, and C Tower. The building was first occupied in 1966; residents lived in A and B Towers while construction of C Tower was completed (this fact gave birth to the student "legend" that C Tower was constructed of spare parts from A and B towers). The third tower was completed and occupied in 1967.

=== Renaming ===
In 1976 the building was rechristened "Warren Towers" as a tribute to three generations of the Warren family at Boston University: William Fairfield Warren (the university's first president), William Marshall Warren (a Dean of the College of Arts and Sciences; son of William Fairfield Warren), and Shields Warren (a famous physician; son of William Marshall Warren and grandson of William Fairfield Warren). Additionally, each tower was renamed in honor of one of the men; A Tower is now "Fairfield Tower", B Tower is "Marshall Tower", and C Tower is "Shields Tower". Bronze plaques in the main lobby commemorate the three men. Although these are the formal names of the towers, it is rare to hear anyone refer to them in this way; the A/B/C convention is far more popular.

== Gender segregation ==
The facility opened before the introduction of coeducational housing at BU, and as such A and B Towers housed women, and C Tower men. This reflected the high female-to-male ratio, a statistic that BU is still known for today. Although the building is now coeducational, some floors remain exclusively male or female. When in use by the university's summer programs (Academy of Media Production, High School Honors, Summer Challenge, Upward Bound, Upward Bound Math Science, Visual Arts’ Summer Institute, Summer Theatre Institute, Program in Mathematics for Young Scientists), one tower is exclusively male, while a second is exclusively female.

== Layout ==
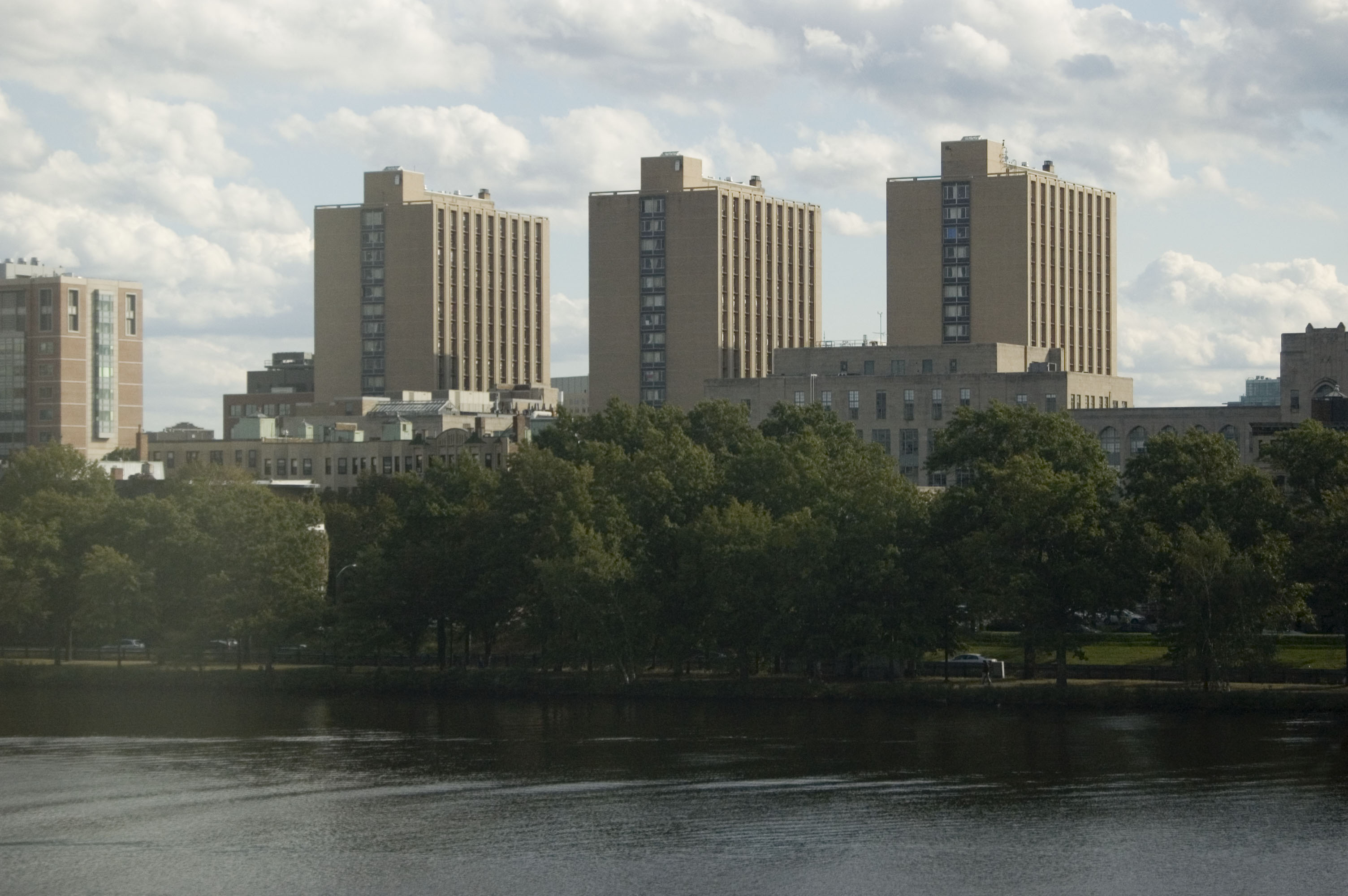
Warren Towers rises over the Charles River.

Warren Towers, 18 stories in height, is the largest dormitory on the Boston University campus. Its three towers sit atop a four-story base structure. The first three floors (and a basement) are a university parking facility; the fourth floor contains the dorm's lobby, dining hall, and other amenities including study lounges and laundry rooms.

Each of the tower's 14 residential floors house approximately 40 residents, including the Resident Assistant (RA). Most floors are divided into 18 doubles, four singles (including one for the RA), and a quad, though there are exceptions to this. For example, some floors in C Tower are home to faculty-in-residence, for whom small apartments have been created from the existing floor plan. All floors have two shared bathrooms, with gender depending on the makeup of the floor.

In addition, all floors have a common room, except floors 5A and 5B, where a small laundry room is provided, and floor 17 of tower B, which is a boiler room for the facility. Like other campus housing facilities throughout campus, some floors are designated for certain schools. For example, the 11th floor of C Tower house only communication students.

== Retail space ==
Originally the building presented one long blank wall along the 700 block of Commonwealth Avenue, with the exception of the plate-glass entryway leading to the escalator banks. One of the initiatives undertaken early in the tenure of President John Silber was to carve retail space out of the building at street level, to generate income. Today retail establishments accessible at street-level include Bank of America and Citizens Bank ATMs, Subway, Basho Express, a Japanese fusion to-go restaurant, and a City Convenience store. A Taco Bell closed in April 2008.

In the 1980s, retail tenants included Rumple's (a full-service restaurant; this space later became a Taco Bell); Nikki's sandwich shop (immediately west of the escalator entrance for the dormitory); and a Store 24 convenience store, which later converted to a university-owned "City Convenience" store.

== Parking ==
Despite the ample parking space afforded by the multileveled garage in the lower section of the building, designated as Lot K, residential student parking is not permitted. The exception to this is for a short time around move-in and move-out periods when parking is free and the elevator banks are permitted to drop to the third floor of the garage, bypassing security and easing the moving experience.

At all other times parking is for faculty and staff by permit from the Office of Parking Services, commuter student parking after 3pm by permit, or on a cash basis (the university leverages its close proximity to Fenway Park during baseball season to generate income in this way). Overnight parking is forbidden.

== The Big U ==
Neal Stephenson's satirical first novel, The Big U, was loosely based on his experiences in Warren Towers, and is set in a fictional dormitory similar to Warren — with eight towers instead of three, but connected at a commons above ground level.
