= 575 Commonwealth Avenue =

Coordinates: 42°20′58″N 71°5′55″W

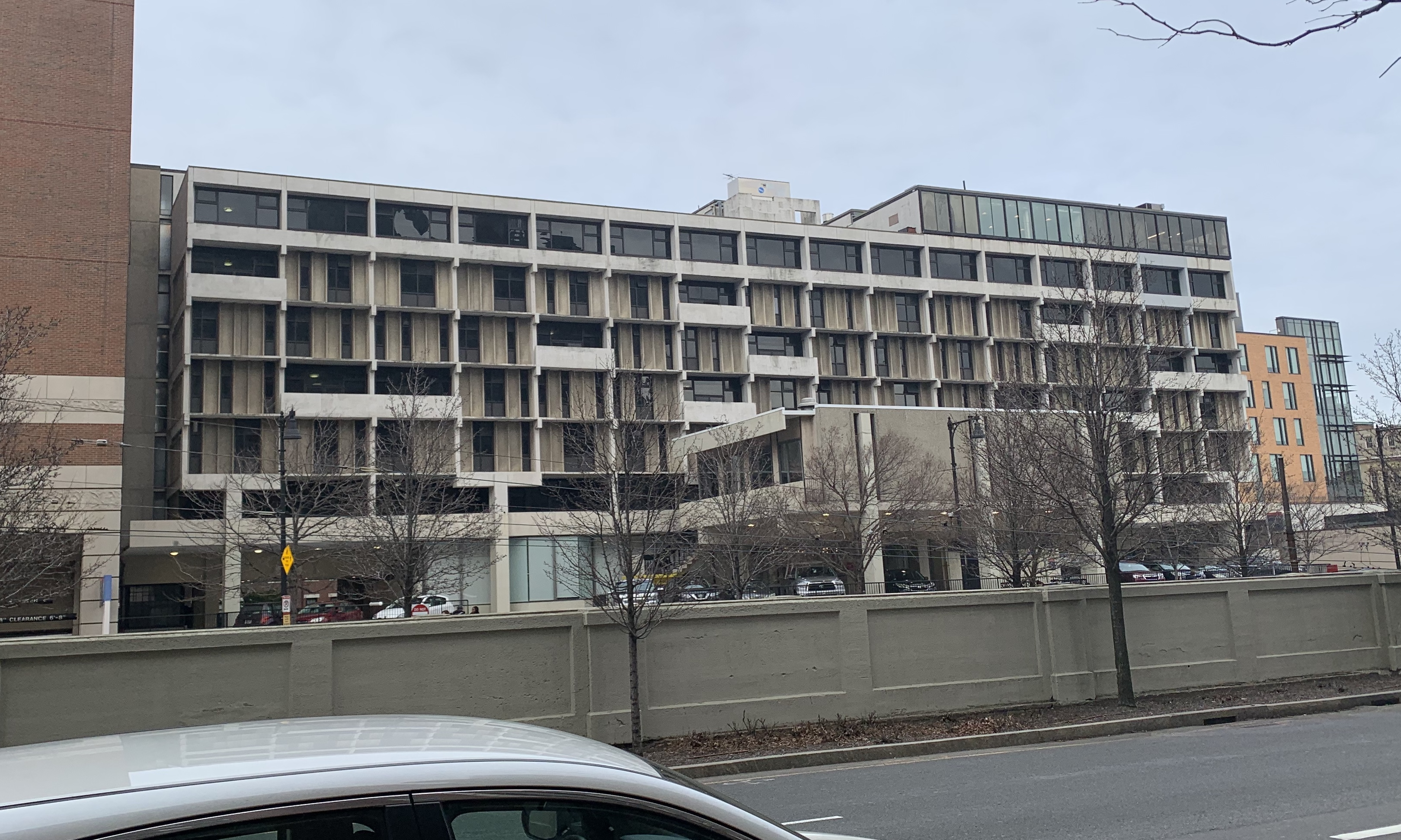
- Former names: Howard Johnson's Hotel, Fenway Commonwealth Motor Hotel
- Alternative names: HoJo

General information
- Location: 575 Commonwealth Avenue, Boston, MA
- Opened: 1963
- Owner: Boston University

Technical details
- Floor count: 7

Other information
- Parking: Underground garage

575 Commonwealth Avenue is a dormitory at Boston University. Until 2001 the building was a Howard Johnson hotel owned by the university. It is located in Kenmore Square next to the Rafik B. Hariri Building, which houses the Questrom School of Business.

== History ==
The building at 575 Commonwealth Avenue opened in November 1963 as the Fenway Commonwealth Motor Hotel. It contained 150 rooms and a 135-car garage. It was the third hotel in the Commonwealth Motor Hotel chain. In 1975 the hotel became a Howard Johnson's.

The seventh floor was home to a cocktail lounge. Originally known as the Cartoon Room, it later became a Top 40 club called the Up and Up Lounge. In 1983 it became a jazz club known as the Starlight Roof. Among the artists to perform at the Starlight were Ruby Braff, Tanya Hart, Tal Farlow, Phil Wilson, Scott Hamilton, Guy Van Duser, Marian McPartland, and Chris Connor. The lounge's final incarnation was as a nightclub known as the Lava Bar.

On March 6, 1981, a four alarm fire broke out in the hotel. Twenty guests had to be rescued from balconies and window ledges. Six guests and two firefighters were treated for smoke inhalation.

In 1987, the hotel's swimming pool was closed from August 19 to September 23 for sanitary violations.

In 1992, Boston University purchased the hotel for $7.5 Million. At the time of the purchase, the university stated that the building would most likely be renovated to serve as a conference center, possibly in conjunction with the Boston University School of Management that was going to be built next door. After the purchase, BU leased the building to Howard Johnson Co. BU rented out for its students at the hotel when there was a shortage of student housing.

On February 5, 1994, about 200 people were evacuated from the hotel after a fire broke out on the top floor of the building. Five people were treated for smoke inhalation.

In August 2001, the Boston Redevelopment Authority approved the university's plan to convert the hotel into a dormitory.

== Layout ==
The dorm is coeducational, and houses 456 residents on six residential floors. It lacks a dining facility; residents must eat at one of the three on-campus dining locations (the nearest being 100 Bay State Road). However, residents do enjoy a number of amenities that are unusual for dormitory style housing, owing to the building's previous life as a hotel. These include air conditioning and private bathrooms for each room.

Most rooms are triple occupancy, with very few double and single occupancy rooms also found throughout.

== Nicknames ==
While the University officially refers to the facility as "575 Commonwealth Avenue," students sometimes shorten this to simply "575," but almost exclusively call it "HoJo," in reference to its previous use.

== Parking ==
The building is constructed over a dual-tiered parking garage. Under normal circumstances these parking areas are reserved for staff members with the proper permit. The university also sells spaces during Red Sox games at nearby Fenway Park.

== Hostel use ==
During the summer months 575 is leased by Hostelling International as a destination for tourism. It is known as the Fenway Summer Hostel.
