= Bay State (TV series) =

American college television soap opera

- Genre: Soap opera
- Created by: Delaina Dixon; Tom Rotolo
- Written by: Various
- Country of origin: United States
- No. of seasons: 34
- No. of episodes: 180

Production
- Executive producer: Various
- Running time: 60 minutes/30 minutes (recent)
- Production company: Boston University College of Communication

Original release
- Network: Various (1991–2006); butv10 (2006–present)
- Release: January 1991

Bay State is an ongoing television series broadcast on butv10 on the Boston University campus. Originated in 1991, Bay State is the longest-running continuously produced student soap opera in the United States. The series is set at the fictional Beacon Hill College and focuses on the sordid lives of the students there. The 150th episode of Bay State aired in January 2016.

== History ==
Bay State was created in 1991 by Delaina Dixon and Tom Rotolo, making it the longest-running continuously produced student soap opera in the United States. Dixon was inspired by a 1989 episode of 48 Hours profiling a student soap opera at UCLA called University, which was produced from 1986 to 1990. Entirely student-produced, Bay State originally aired on the Boston University campus via closed-circuit television and screenings, was broadcast by the public-access television service Boston Neighborhood Network, and was eventually streamed on the internet. The Boston University College of Communication premiered its own channel, butv10, on February 22, 2006, which includes Bay State in its ongoing programming.

In 1995, Bay State was featured on MTV News and Extra.

The 150th episode of Bay State aired in January 2016.

== Plot ==
Using the tagline "Sex, drugs and murder", the series is set at the fictional Beacon Hill College and focuses on the sordid lives of the students there. It explores social issues related to college students, as well as the dramatic storylines typical of soap operas.

== Series overview ==
Season	Episodes	Originally released	
Season	Episodes	First released	Last released
1	4	January 1991	April 1991
2	9	September 1991	May 1992
3	10	September 1992	May 1993
4	6	October 15, 1993	April 22, 1994
5	2	October 21, 1994	November 11, 1994
17	5	November 29, 2006	October 16, 2007
18	5	January 18, 2008	May 12, 2008
19	5	November 10, 2008	May 15, 2009
20	6	October 2009	May 5, 2010
21	6	September 2010	May 2011
22	6	September 2011	May 2012
23	5	December 2012	May 2013
24	6	2013	2014
25	6	2014	December 11, 2015
26	4	January 28, 2016	April 4, 2017
27	3	October 31, 2017	March 26, 2018
28	3	April 30, 2018	May 1, 2018
29	7	October 5, 2018	May 8, 2019
30	5	December 27, 2019	May 14, 2021
31	2	February 16, 2022	February 16, 2022
32	2	December 12, 2022	December 12, 2022
33	2	December 19, 2022	December 19, 2022
34	3	May 11, 2023	May 11, 2023

== Notable cast and crew ==
Bay State has featured guest appearances by Days of Our Lives actors Kristian Alfonso, Alison Sweeney and Austin Peck, as well as The Daily Show host Jon Stewart. Miss Hawaii USA 1992 Heather Hays, later a news anchor at KDFW, appeared on the show in 1993. In the 2000s, the series featured Sarah Hartshorne (as "Samantha Carver") before her appearance on The CW's America's Next Top Model in 2007. Kate Hackett, creator of the web series Classic Alice, also appeared on Bay State.

Notable crew members include Dixon, an entertainment journalist and host of VH1's The Gossip Table; Catherine Burns of The Moth; Rotolo, a TV production manager and producer; and Nicole Savini, senior producer of The Colbert Report.

== Awards and nominations ==
Year	Award	Category	Result	Notes
2008	Aegis Award	Student Programming	Won	
2009	Telly Award	TV Programming/Student	Won	
2013	Telly Award	TV Programming/Student	Won	Episode 133
2014	Telly Award	TV Programming/Student	Won	Episode 137
2014	Telly Award	TV Programming/Student	Won	Episode 138
2014	NATAS College/University Student Honoree	Long Form - Fiction	Nominated	Episode 138: "A Cinderella Story"; Lee Ann Carluccio (Producer), Evan Tuohey (Producer)
