= 610 Beacon Street =

College dormitory

Coordinates: 42°20′58.97″N 71°05′39.88″W

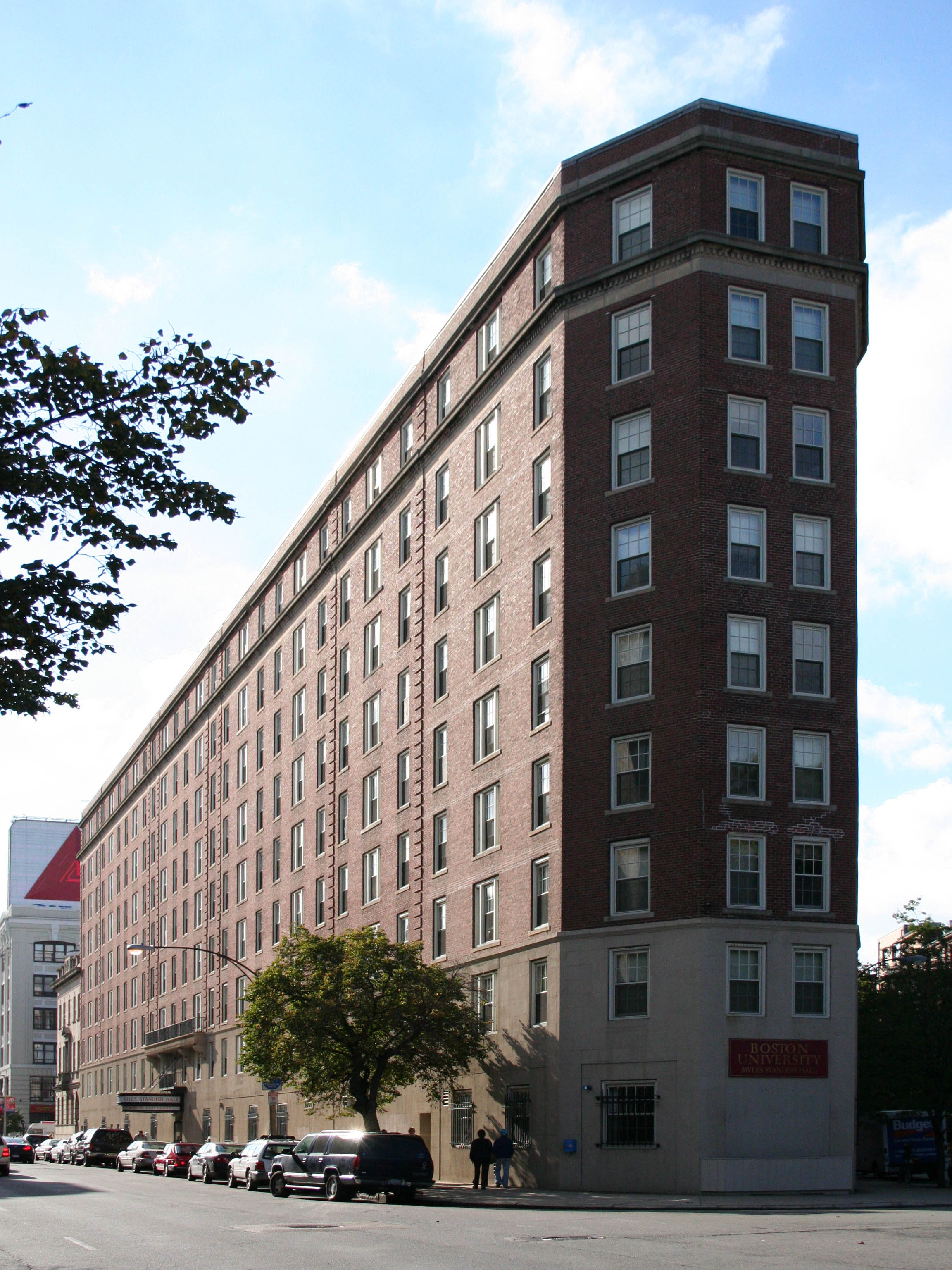

610 Beacon Street, formerly and still commonly referred to as Myles Standish Hall, is a Boston University dormitory located at 610 Beacon Street, in Kenmore Square. Originally constructed in 1925 and opened as the Myles Standish Hotel, it was deemed to be one of the finest hotels in the world. In 1949, BU acquired the building and converted it into a dormitory.

In 2018, BU completed a comprehensive two-year renovation, completely rebuilding the interior of the building. In 2021, the Massachusett Tribe at Ponkapoag requested the dorm be renamed to Wituwamat Memorial Hall to honor a leading Native American figure massacred by Myles Standish. Robert A. Brown, President of Boston University, responded to this effort and stated Standish's "role in the history of the founding of Massachusetts, and thus our nation, was significant. To remove his name from the residence hall would discount his significant role in our history. I am not prepared to remove his name at this time."

However, in May 2024, an article in a university publication announced that in response to a request from the Faculty Council, the name of the building would be changed, noting "the dorm will be known simply by its address, 610 Beacon Street, at least for the time being."

== As a hotel ==
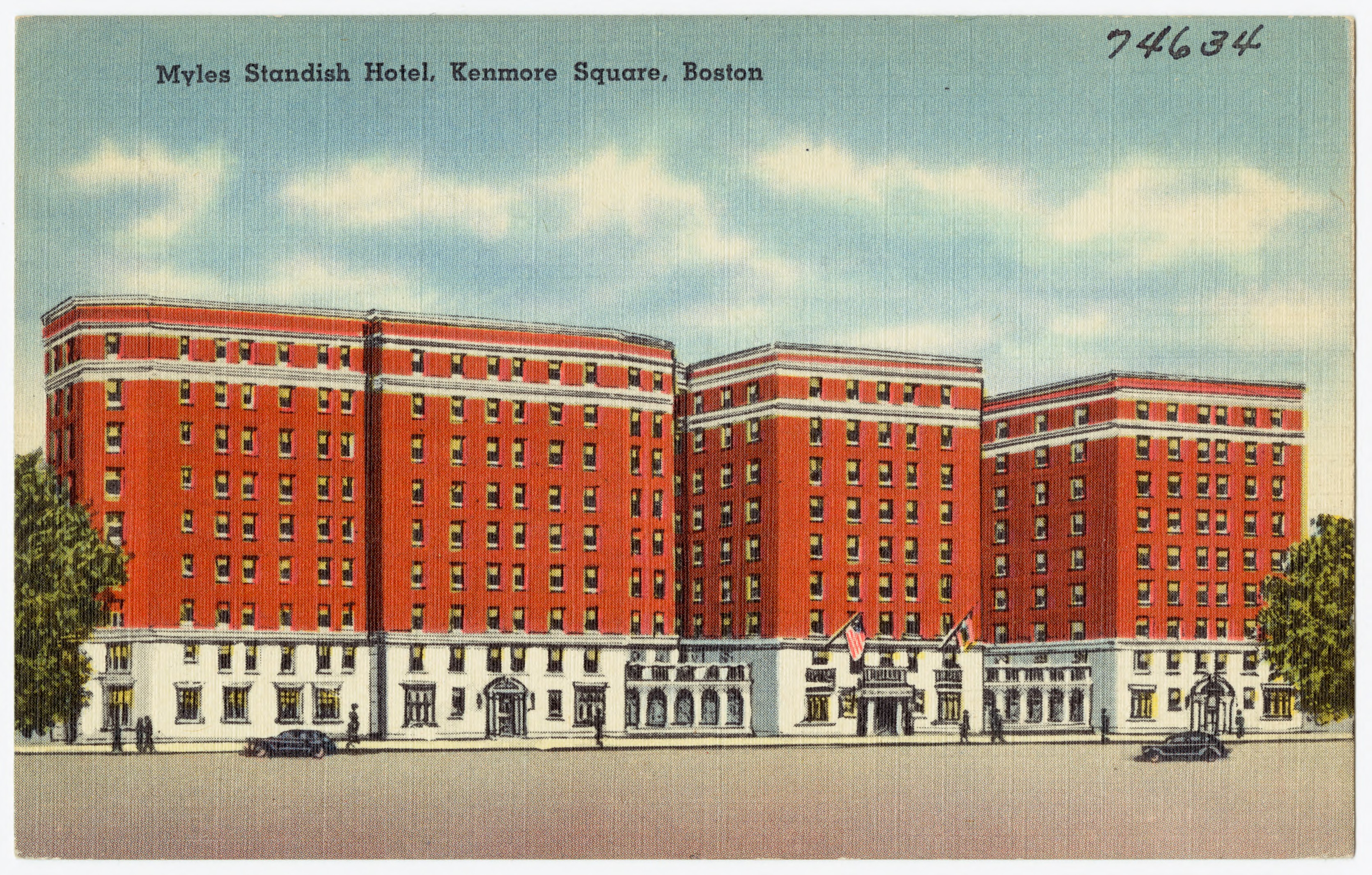
1940s postcard of the hotel

When the doors to the hotel opened in 1928, it offered many amenities and was situated in a prime location in the developing Back Bay neighborhood in Boston next to the Kenmore Square trolley station. It was one of many such hotels, including the Sheraton located just down the street at 91 Bay State Road, which would itself be later purchased by BU and converted into a dormitory.

Due to its proximity to Fenway Park, the hotel was often patronized by visiting baseball clubs. Babe Ruth himself stayed there often and liked suite 818 so much that he made it a habit to request it specifically.

In 1933, Charles Newton took over as manager and rescued it from the Great Depression, turning it into a fashionable apartment hotel. He left when the hotel was sold to the Sheraton Corporation in 1943. In 1949, the building was sold to Boston University.

== Becoming a dormitory ==
The University, experiencing heavy growth due to returning World War II troops making use of their G.I. Bill entitlements, was in desperate need of housing for students, and quickly converted the facility to dormitory use for its male students.

In 1970, Myles made BU history by becoming the first dorm to permit guests of any gender 24 hours a day.

In the summer of 1973, Myles was "condemned" due to structural problems. BU obtained alternate dormitory space that year at Fensgate Hall down Beacon St., with dining across the street at Charlesgate Hall. Myles reopened for the 1974–75 academic year.

In 1979, with the bankruptcy of Grahm Junior College, the University purchased the school's administration building adjacent to Myles. This building had several uses before being permanently converted into dormitory space and annexed to Myles, giving birth to what is now known as Myles Annex. With the renovation of Myles completed in 2018, the Annex is fully integrated into Myles Standish Hall.

== Layout ==
Myles is a nine-story building. The first floor houses the building's mailroom, multiple group study rooms, games room, laundry room, a residence life office and a community kitchen. The dining hall was closed beginning in Fall 2012 with the main dining room being converted into a multipurpose room. The remaining eight floors are residential.

The shape of the building is somewhat unusual. Due to the irregular proportions of the plot of land on which it was built at the intersection of Bay State Road and Beacon Street, the building is known for its sharp point resembling the prow of a ship. This makes for unusual floor plans.

The eight residential levels accommodate 730 residents in a coeducational setting with rooms arrayed in a semi-suite-style setting. There are a variety of suite configurations ranging from two single-bedroom suites to suites with eight single bedrooms. The predominant unit has two single bedrooms and one double-occupancy bedroom sharing a bathroom. Myles' fourth floor is designated as the Global House living/learning community.
