= The Gossip Table =

- Genre: Tabloid/entertainment program
- Created by: Shane Farley; Lee Rolontz; Keshia Williams
- Starring: Rob Shuter; Marianne Garvey; Noah Levy; Chloe Melas; Delaina Dixon
- Country of origin: United States
- Original language: English
- No. of seasons: 3
- No. of episodes: 76

Production
- Executive producer: Shane Farley
- Running time: 22 minutes
- Production company: Cypress E Productions

Original release
- Network: VH1
- Release: June 3, 2013 – June 5, 2015

The Gossip Table is a live daily entertainment news program on VH1 that premiered on June 3, 2013 and last aired on June 5, 2015. Broadcast weekday mornings, the show featured five entertainment columnists presenting entertainment news and gossip.

== Overview ==
Announced in May 2013 as a fill-in for Big Morning Buzz Live while that series was on break, The Gossip Table ran weekdays at 9:00 am for four weeks starting June 3, 2013. It later returned in the 9:30 am slot on September 30, 2013 as a lead-in to Big Morning Buzz Live. Its third season ended on June 5, 2015.

The series featured five entertainment and gossip columnists who break celebrity news "and give their immediate takes in a panel-like discussion."

The Gossip Table was created and executive produced by Shane Farley, and was the first show from his production company Cypress E Productions. Lee Rolontz and Keshia Williams were also executive producers. Both Gossip Table and Big Morning Buzz Live aired live from VH1's Time Square Studios at One Astor Plaza in New York City, in the former home of the MTV series Total Request Live.

On August 25, 2015, VH1 cancelled both Big Morning Buzz Live and The Gossip Table.

== Co-hosts ==
The five original co-hosts of The Gossip Table were Rob Shuter, Marianne Garvey, Noah Levy, Chloe Melas and Delaina Dixon. Perez Hilton had been announced as a replacement host for Noah Levy in July 2015 before the show was cancelled in August 2015.
