= Tanya Hart =

American broadcaster

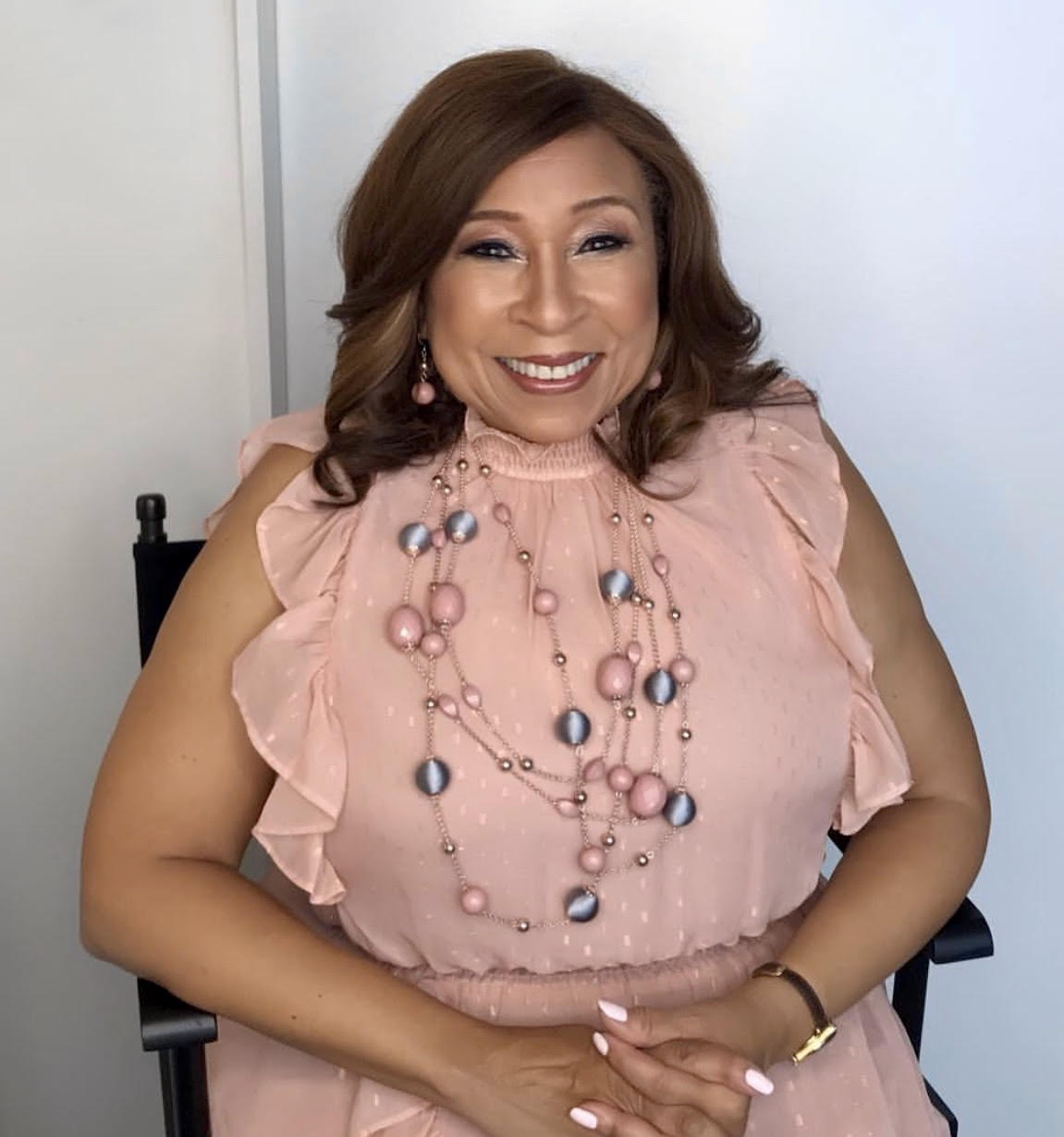
- Hart taping a video special for AURN
- Born: January 29; United States
- Occupations: TV Host, Radio Host, Red Carpet Host & Hollywood Producer
- Known for: American Urban Radio Networks (AURN), BET & E! Entertainment

Tanya Hart is an American television presenter, syndicated radio host and producer. She hosted entertainment programs such as E! Entertainment Television's Gossip Show, and on BET's Live From LA With Tanya Hart. In 2016, she was elected as co-chair of The Caucus for Producers, Writers & Directors, making her the first African-American and first woman to head up the 40-year-old entertainment industry trade organization.

== Television and radio career ==
Tanya Hart is a Los Angeles-based syndicated radio personality who hosts Hollywood Live with Tanya Hart on more than 300 stations for American Urban Radio Networks (AURN). As part of her syndicated show, she produces the daily AURN radio news prep sheet, “Show Props” that is serviced to her radio affiliates.

She was also the very first talk show host on BET where she hosted Live From LA With Tanya Hart and interviewed Hollywood stars such as Ice Cube, John Singleton, Halle Berry, Will Smith, and Smokey Robinson in the 1990s.

While hosting Live From LA With Tanya Hart, she conducted the very first televised interview with rapper Tupac Shakur. Excerpts from her interview with Shakur were featured in the 2003 documentary Tupac: Resurrection, which was nominated for the Academy Award for Best Documentary Feature at the 77th Academy Awards. Additional excerpts from the video were also included in Andrew Acampora's book about Shakur called Tupac: The Modern Day Messiah: The Rose that Had Grown from Concrete.

Hart previously worked at Boston WBZ-TV in a variety of roles, including as host of the public affairs program Coming Together, for which she also interviewed celebrities and news figures. In 1990, she had a one-on-one interview with Winnie Mandela during the world tour of Mandela and her then-husband, Nelson Mandela, for a U.S. television exclusive.

Hart was a contributor for five season on Geraldo and has also appeared on Rolonda, Court TV, Inside Edition, Celebrity Justice, Sally Jessy Raphael, and Forgive or Forget.

In 2005, she released her debut album Tanya Hart Sings.

Hart is an Emmy Award-winning producer for her own company Tanya Hart Communications, Inc. Her multi-media content company that recently produced a national awareness campaign act against HIV/AIDS for the Centers for Disease Control and Prevention (CDC).

She has also produced several documentaries for PBS, as well an audio documentary "Ray Charles: The Music Lives On" that can be heard on British Airways and on iTunes.
