= Butv10 =

Student media network at Boston University

butv10
- Type: Student-run television
- Country: United States
- Owner: Boston University College of Communication (COM)
- Launch date: February 22, 2006
- Official website: http://www.butv10.com

BUTV10 (stylized butv10) is Boston University’s student-operated media production and distribution network. Live-streamed and on-demand programming is available online at butv10.com and on campus television channel 10. The network's production facilities and administrative departments are based at the Boston University College of Communication (COM).

Established in 1984 as BUTV by then COM freshman Staffan Sandberg and rebranded BUTV10 in 2005, the organization produces an array of news, information, sports, drama, comedy, and variety programming. Content has received multiple Associated Press, NATAS, Telly, and Webby Award recognitions.

== Origins ==
BUTV was established in 1984 by COM freshman Staffan Sandberg. Though students produced content under the BUTV umbrella for two decades, Boston University had no formal distribution platform. According to butv10 faculty advisor Christophor Cavalieri, once the campus was wired for cable, the plan for a student-run television station was initiated in September 2005. The name BUTV10 was announced in November 2005, and the channel premiered on February 22, 2006. The student production group was also renamed Growling Dog Productions, as BU's mascot is Rhett the Boston Terrier. The network's production facilities and administrative departments are based at the College of Communication. Membership is open to any BU student.

== Programs ==
Show Name	Genre	Status	Description
Bay State	Drama	Current; 1991–present	Longest-running continuously produced student soap opera in the United States
BU Tonight	Late-night talk show	Past; 2006-?	Late night-style talk show
COED	Situation comedy	Current	Mockumentary-style sitcom focusing on gender-neutral housing
COMlife	Reality	Past; 2014–present	Documentary series about the lives of BU students
Full Circle	Talk show	Past	University-related interviews and performances
Good Morning, BU	Morning show	Current; 2013–present	Live morning news and talk show
The Hungry Terrier	Food	Current; 2014–present	Cooking, dining and food news
Inside Boston	News magazine	Current	Local Boston news and features
The Morning After	Morning show	Current	Morning news and talk show parody
Offsides	Sports talk show	Current	Professional sports news talk show
On That Point	News	Current; 2006–present	Round table debate show covering current events, politics and culture
One-on-Ones	Talk show	Current; 2014–present	Alumni and celebrity interviews
Paper Trail	Drama	Current; 2014–present	Dramatic scripted series about the academic black market
Pinnacle	Film	Past	Narrative and documentary film work created by BU faculty and alumni
Pop Showdown!	Game show	Current	Trivia about music, movies, TV, pop culture and BU itself
Proud to BU	Sports	Current; 2014–present	One-minute segments devoted to BU Athletics
Redstone Showcase	Variety	Past	Films featured in BU's Redstone Film Festival
Rendered	Variety	Past	Showcase of student film, video and broadcast journalism work
Shadows	Drama	Current; 1995–present	Science fiction/supernatural scripted series
Student Shorts	Talk show	Current; 2014–present	Student-produced short films
Terrier Nation	Sports news	Current	SportsCenter-style show covering all BU sports
The Wire	News	Current	Daily news wire
That's Debatable	Talk Show	Past	Controversial issues of the day
Warren Towers	Comedy	Past	Documentary-style comedy about BU dorm life
Welcome Back (formerly Welcome Back, Brotter)	Situation comedy	Past	Sitcom about college friends

== Awards and nominations ==
butv10 has received various awards and nominations. In 2007, Inside Boston executive producers Ted Fioraliso and Brittany Oat won the Fox News Channel College Challenge for a news package on an eminent domain case, receiving cash prizes for themselves and butv10.

Year	Award	Category	Show/Student	Genre	Result	Notes
2008	Telly Award	TV Programming/Student	On That Point	Debate and discussion	Won	
2008	Aegis Award	Student Programming	Bay State	Drama	Won	
2009	Telly Award	TV Programming/Student	Bay State	Drama	Won	
2009	Webby Award	Website/Student	butv10.com	Website	Nominated	One of only five student sites nominated
2010	Telly Award	TV Programming/Student	Inside Boston	News magazine	Won	Episode 1104
2011	Telly Award	TV Programming/Student	On That Point	Debate and discussion	Won	Episode "Living the Dream"
2012	Telly Award	TV Programming/Student	Welcome Back Brotter	Situation comedy	Won	Season 3, Episode 2
2013	Telly Award	TV Programming/Student	Bay State	Drama	Won	Episode 133
2013	Telly Award	TV Programming/Student	Welcome Back Brotter	Situation comedy	Won	Episode "Back to the Brotter"
2013	Telly Award	TV Programming/Student	Inside Boston	News magazine	Won	Election Special
2013	New England Associated Press Student Award	Best Election Coverage	Decision 2012	Election special	Won	Four-hours; televised and live-streamed
2013	New England Associated Press Student Award	Best News Hard Feature	"Aftermath of Superstorm Sandy"	News	Won	
2013	New England Associated Press Student Award	Best Public Affairs Coverage	Inside Boston	News magazine	Won	“Death With Dignity & Medical Marijuana”
2013	NATAS (National Academy of Television Arts and Sciences) College/University Student Award For Excellence (Boston/New England Chapter)	General Assignment - Serious News	"Gun Control"	News	Won	Chris Costa (Reporter)
2013	NATAS College/University Student Award	Public Affairs/Community Service	Inside Boston	News magazine	Won	“Question 3 – Medical Marijuana Initiative”; Christophor Cavalieri (Faculty Advisor), Sandra Hooper (Producer), Victoria Price (Producer), Deedee Sun (Producer)
2013	NATAS College/University Student Award	General Assignment - Serious News	"Medical Marijuana" "Boston Startups"	News	Nominated	Tiana Bohner ("Medical Marijuana" Reporter); Deedee Sun ("Boston Startups" Reporter)
2013	NATAS College/University Student Award	General Assignment - Light News	"Missing Unicorn?" "Chessmaster"	News	Nominated	Luke Jones ("Missing Unicorn?" Reporter); Alexander Hyacinthe ("Chessmaster" Reporter)
2013	NATAS College/University Student Award	Long Form - Non-Fiction	Inside Boston	News magazine	Nominated	“Question 3 – Medical Marijuana Initiative”; Christophor Cavalieri (Faculty Advisor)
2013	NATAS College/University Student Award	Newscast	BUTV News at Noon	News	Nominated	November 7, 2012 broadcast/Election coverage; Susan Walker (Broadcast Journalism Professor/Director), Chris Costa (Student/Anchor), Deedee Sun (Student/Anchor), Victoria Price (Student/Election Correspondent)
2013	NATAS College/University Student Award	Talent	Brooke Singman (Anchor/Reporter)	News	Nominated	
2014	Telly Award	TV Programming/Student	Bay State	Drama	Won	Episode 137
2014	Telly Award	TV Programming/Student	Bay State	Drama	Won	Episode 138
2014	NATAS College/University Student Award	General Assignment - Serious News	Triumph, The Tragedy: Marathon Bombings	News	Won	RD Sahl (Coordinator), Michelle Johnson (Web Site Editor)
2014	NATAS College/University Student Award	Long Form - Fiction	Welcome Back	Situation comedy	Won	Episode "Theodore"; Emily Sheehan (Producer), Sam Hayes (Producer), Amanda Domuracki (Producer)
2014	NATAS College/University Student Award	Short Form - Non-Fiction	"Fishy Science"	News	Won	Victoria Price (Reporter)
2014	NATAS College/University Student Award	Sports	Proud to BU	Sports	Won	John-Michael Sedor (Producer), Christophor Cavalieri (Faculty Advisor)
2014	NATAS College/University Student Award	Editor	COM In A Day	Documentary	Won	Max Belin (Editor/Producer), Micha Sabovik (advisor)
2014	NATAS College/University Student Award	Newscast	TV Newsroom: A Final Exam Live Every Week	News	Nominated	Susan Walker (director)
2014	NATAS College/University Student Award	Short Form - Non-Fiction	"Adderall Abuse" "Alzheimer's Disease"	News	Nominated	Alexa Dragoumis ("Adderall Abuse" Reporter); Tiana Bohner ("Alzheimer's Disease" Reporter)
2014	NATAS College/University Student Award	Long Form - Fiction	Bay State	Drama	Nominated	Episode 138: "A Cinderella Story"; Lee Ann Carluccio (Producer), Evan Tuohey (Producer)
2014	NATAS College/University Student Award	Long Form - Non-Fiction	JFK: A Reporter Remembers	Documentary	Nominated	Patrick Thomas (Reporter)
2014	NATAS College/University Student Award	Commercial	COM In A Day	Documentary	Nominated	Max Belin (Producer), Will Dowsett (Producer), Greg Huntoon (Producer), Aaron Bland (Producer), Micha Sabovik (advisor)
2014	NATAS College/University Student Award	Animation/Graphics/Special Effects	A Death In Dallas	Documentary	Nominated	Patrick Thomas (Reporter), RD Sahl (Editor), Michelle Johnson (Web Editor)
2016	Telly Award (Bronze)	TV Programming/Student	On That Point	Debate and discussion	Won	Season 14, Episode 2: "Syrian Refugee Crisis"
2016	Telly Award (Silver)	TV Programming/Student	Paper Trail	Drama	Won	
2016	NATAS College/University Student Award	Long Form - Non-Fiction	On That Point	Debate and discussion	Won	
2016	NATAS College/University Student Award	Long Form - Fiction	Paper Trail	Drama	Won	
2016	ATAS College Television Awards	Series - Scripted	Paper Trail	Drama	Won	2nd Place (Season 2); Amanda Domuracki, Andrew Fewsmith, Wesley Palmer
