= Boston University West Campus =

Campus in Boston, Massachusetts, USA

Coordinates: 42.352918°N 71.119169°W

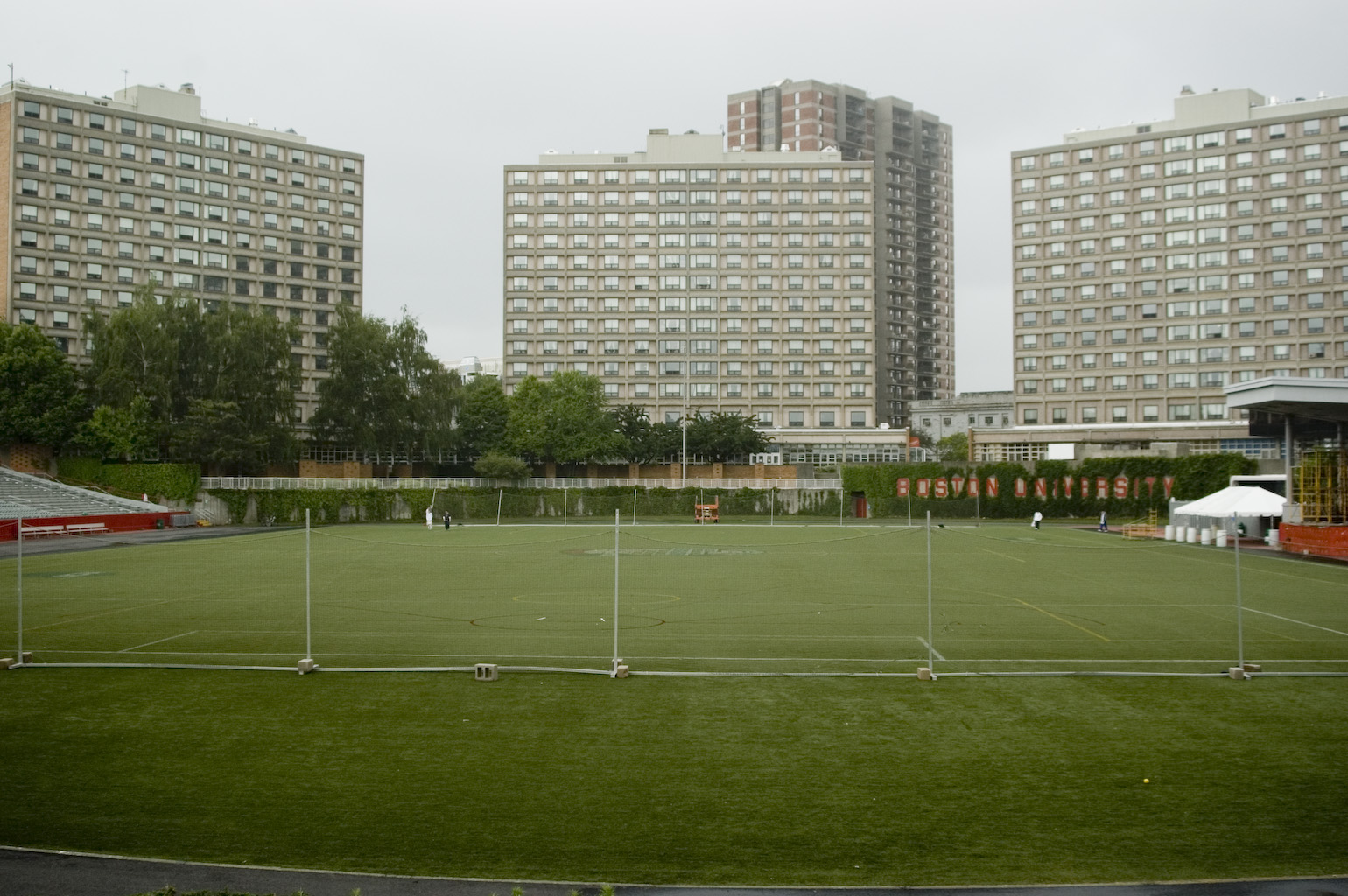
West Campus' three high-rise dorms overlook Nickerson Field.

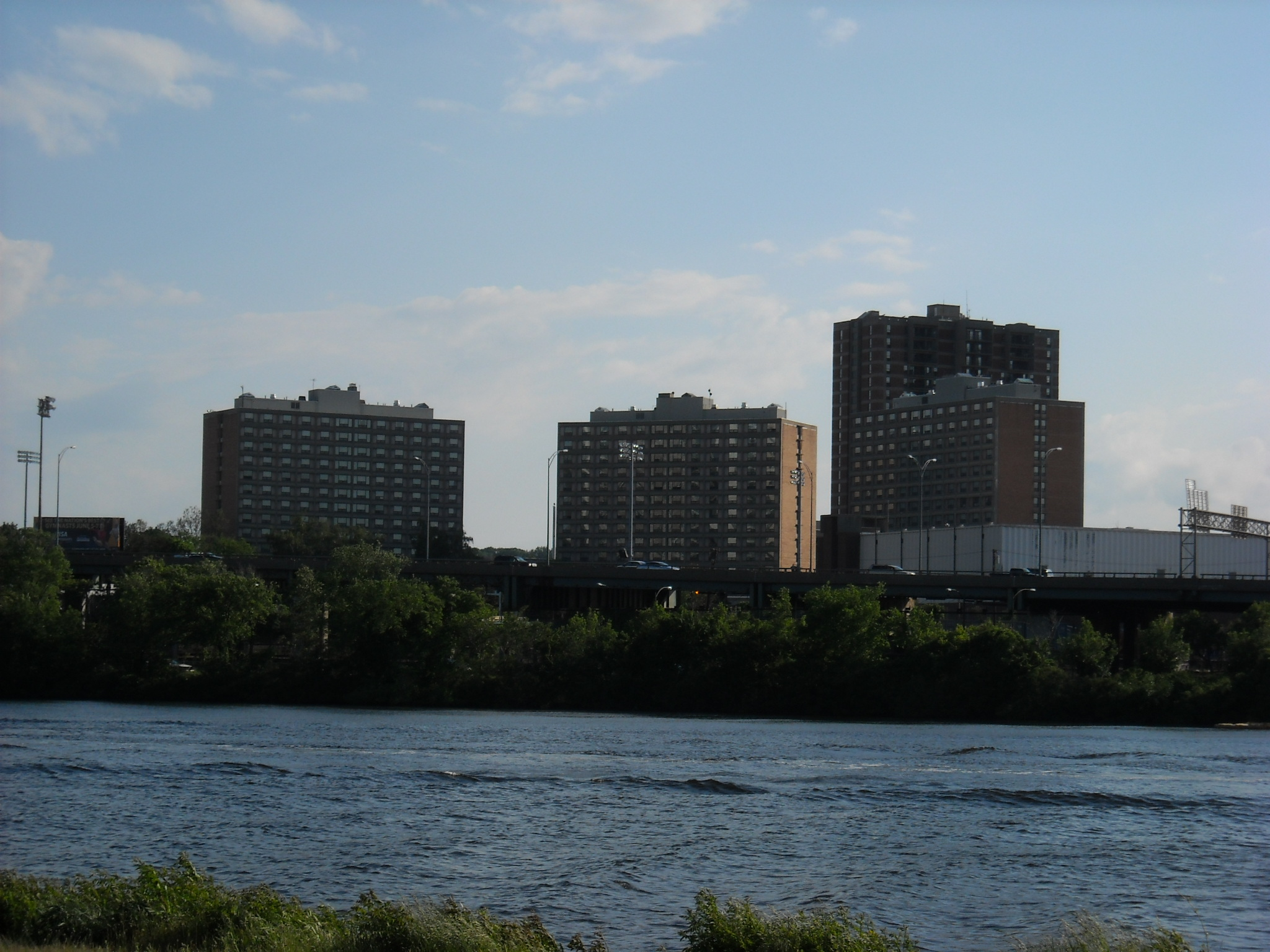
The three dorms seen from across the river

West Campus is an area in the westernmost part of Boston University's Charles River campus in Boston, Massachusetts. The area taken up by West Campus takes up most of the footprint of the former grandstand of Braves Field, whose right field pavilion grandstand is currently used as the primary grandstand for Nickerson Field. The former footprint of the stadium also includes the Case Physical Education Center, whose buildings and adjacent tennis courts take up most of the left field pavilion grandstand area.

West Campus has three high-rises, each housing well over 600 residents. They are named Claflin, Sleeper and Rich Halls after the three founders of Boston University.

West's dining hall differs from the others on campus. Instead of the typical buffet-style cafeteria mode, the dining hall is equipped with numerous food stations (burrito, pasta/Asian noodle toss, vegetarian/vegan, grill, pizza, etc.) where a cook will prepare individual food servings on demand. The dining hall was renovated in the mid-2000s, resulting in a mountain-themed decor.

== Claflin Hall ==
Named after Lee Claflin, Claflin Hall is the building farthest east of the three towers. There are thirteen coed floors, except for the third floor, which is an all-female floor for students in the College of Communication. In 2010, Claflin Hall was the first dorm building in West Campus to be renovated.

Claflin Hall is adjacent to the dining hall, but students must walk to Rich Hall to retrieve their mail and to print in the Resnet computer labs.

== Sleeper Hall ==
Named after Jacob Sleeper, Sleeper Hall is the middle of the three towers. As with Claflin and Rich Hall, the second through thirteenth floors are all residential, with the first floor being home to the Fresh Food Co. dining hall. In 2011, Sleeper Hall was the second dorm in West Campus to be renovated.

The second floor also features study lounges.

== Rich Hall ==
Named after Isaac Rich, Rich Hall is the westernmost of the three towers. The second floor has a different layout than the rest of the building due to its previous use as an infirmary. It contains the most beds of any of the three towers in West Campus. The entire interior of the building was renovated in the summer of 2012, making it the final dorm in West Campus to be modernized.

Unlike Claflin and Sleeper Halls, Rich Hall does not have a dining hall occupying its first floor. Instead, the first floor includes the primary west campus mail room, as well as recently renovated lounge and study areas including a cinema and game room.
