= Kilachand Hall =

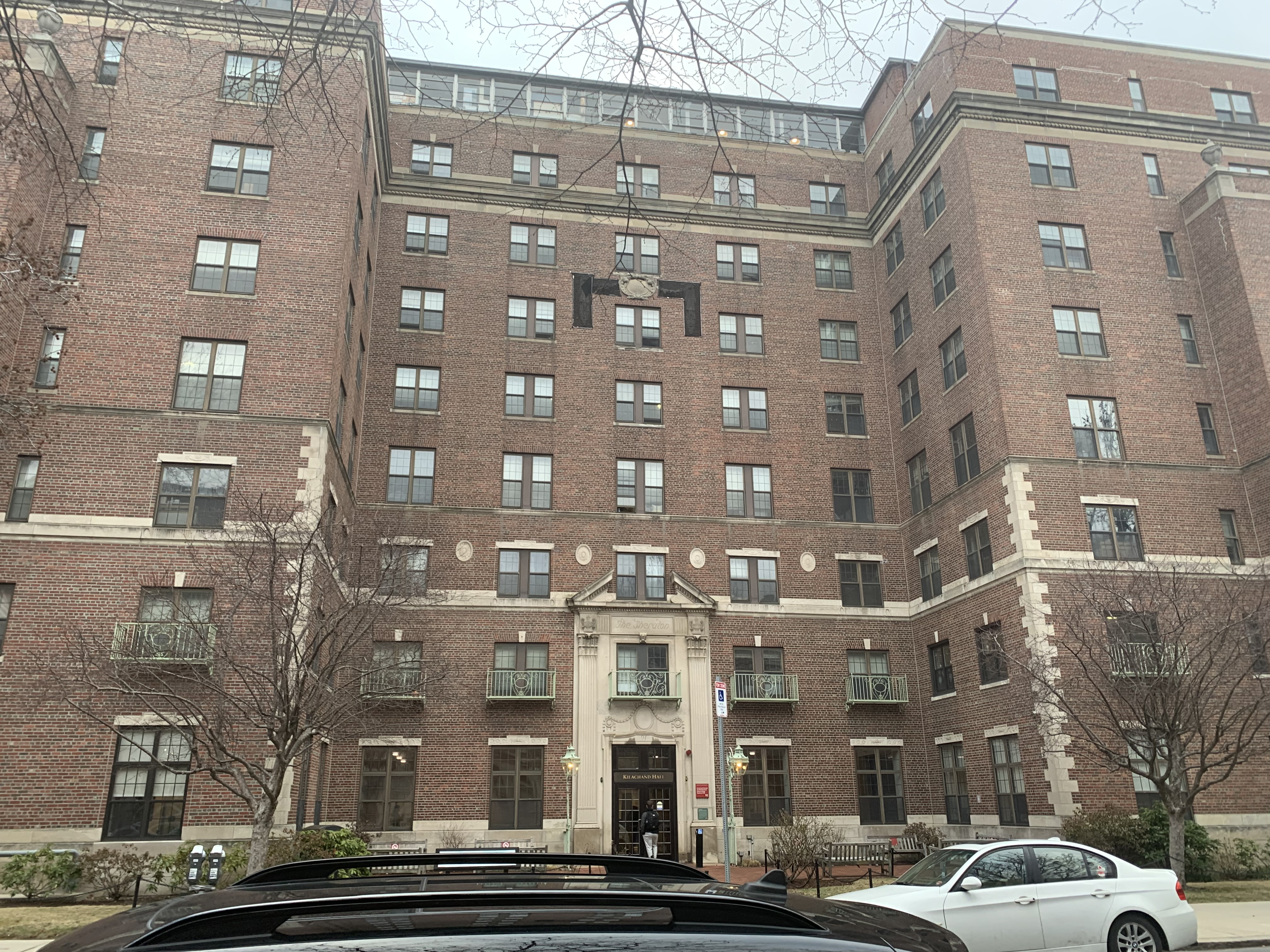
- The front entrance of Kilachand Hall.
- Former names: Shelton Hall, Hotel Sheraton

General information
- Type: Dormitory
- Location: Boston, Massachusetts
- Address: 91 Bay State Road
- Coordinates: 42°21′1″N 71°5′49″W
- Opened: 1923
- Owner: Boston University

Technical details
- Floor count: 9

Kilachand Hall, formerly known as Shelton Hall and before that the Hotel Sheraton, is one of eight dormitories at Boston University. Living quarters are divided into four- and five-person suites, with a few private doubles. It is one of the few dormitories on campus with private bathrooms. The ninth floor consists of a study lounge that provides an impressive view of Cambridge, the Charles River, and Fenway Park.

== History ==
=== Hotel Sheraton ===
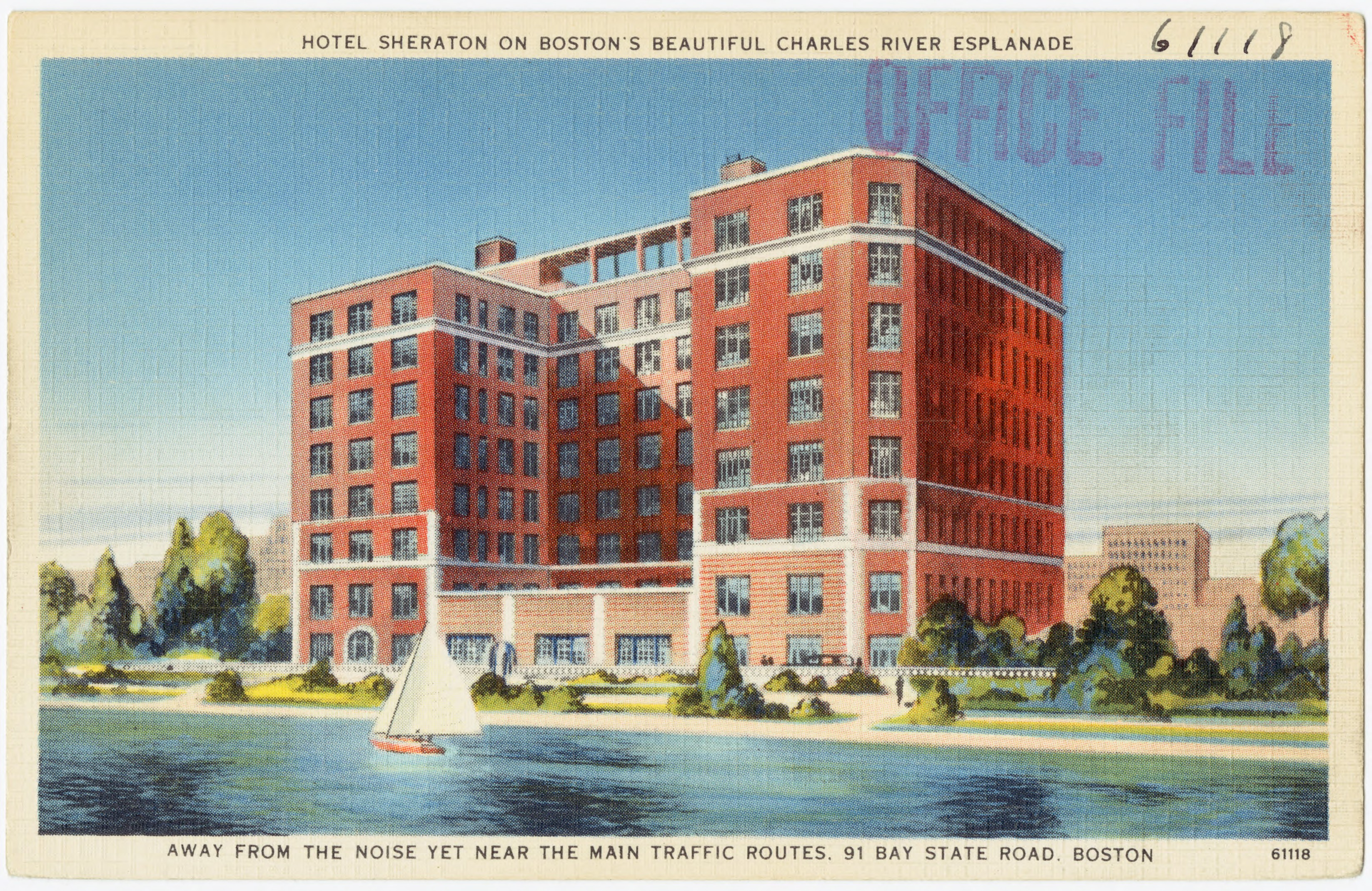
1930s-40s postcard of the hotel

The building was constructed in 1923 as the Sheraton Hotel, by the Bay State Road Company. The name was probably chosen as a reference to furniture designer Thomas Sheraton. Above the entrance the name "Sheraton" can still be seen engraved in the concrete. Unlike the hotels of today, the Sheraton was a type of residential hotel, where it was common for guests to stay for months without signing a lease. The top floor, given its unique views, was used as a ballroom and social space, playing host to jazz bands.

In 1939, Ernest Henderson bought the hotel. At the time, the building had an electric sign on the roof reading "Hotel Sheraton" which would have been too expensive to remove, so he renamed his entire chain Sheraton Hotels, after this property.

=== Shelton Hall ===
In 1950, the building was bought and renamed to the Hotel Shelton. In 1954, Boston University bought the hotel and converted it to a girls-only dormitory of the same name.

In 1953, playwright Eugene O'Neill died in suite 401 on the fourth floor. In his honor, the fourth floor was named a specialty housing area called the Writer's Corridor. School folklore holds that the building is haunted by the playwright. Howard Stern also claims to have lived there.

=== Kilachand Hall ===
In 2013, the building was renamed Kilachand Hall, in accordance with the creation of the Kilachand Honors College. Freshman students in the honors college are required to live on the second, third, fourth, or fifth floor.

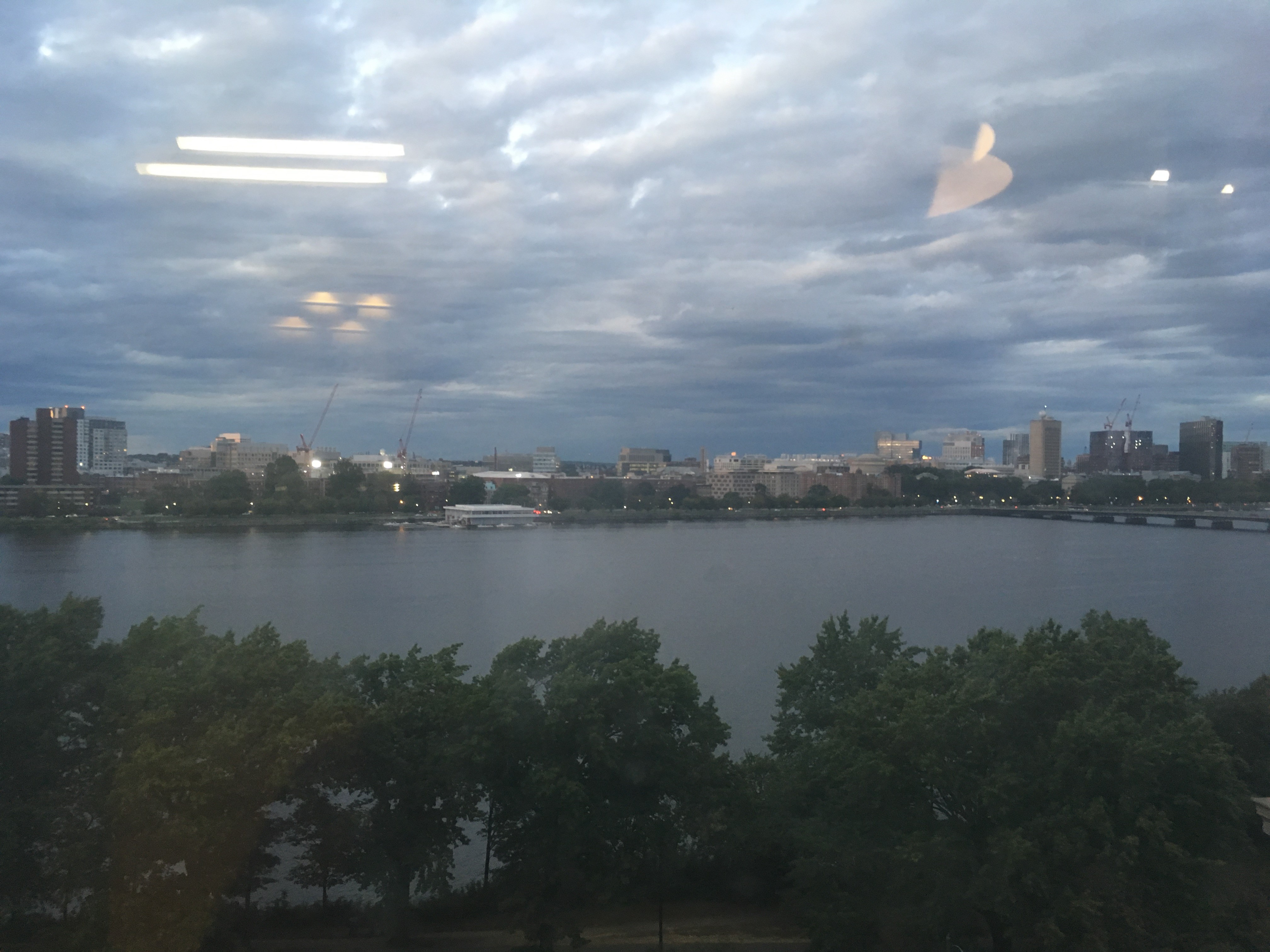
Famous view from the 9th floor

In 2012, the dining hall on the first floor was removed with the opening of a new, larger dining hall, Marciano Commons, across the street. This coincided with a larger renovation of the building that added a study lounge, classroom, and administrative offices for the honors college on the first floor.
