= Bidia Dandaron =

Soviet Buryat Buddhist teacher, author, and dissident (1914–1974)

- Бидия Дандарон
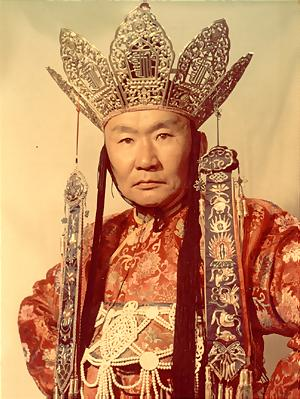

Personal life
- Born: Bidia Dandarovich Dandaron; 28 December [O.S. 14 December] 1914 Ulus of Shalot, Kizhinga, Russian Empire
- Died: 26 October 1974 (aged 59) Vydrino Labor Camp, Vydrino, Buryat Autonomous Soviet Socialist Republic, RSFSR, USSR
- Spouse: Elizaveta Andreevna Shulunova (m. 1931, died) Zundyma Tsydypova (m. 1943)
- Education: Leningrad State University
- Other names: Vidyādhara; Chitta-Vajra (Russian: Читта-Ваджра, romanized: Čitta-Vadžra)
- Occupation: Lama; Buddhologist; Tibetologist; translator

Religious life
- Religion: Buddhism
- Movement: Balagat movement

Senior posting
- Reincarnation: 14th (Buryat) Gyayag Lama Bidiadara Dandaron (Wylie: bidya dha ra)
- Students: Alexander Piatigorsky; Linnart Mäll; Margarita Albedil; Yuri Parfionovich; Oktiabrina Volkova
- Writing career
- Language: Russian; Tibetan
- Subject: Tibetan Buddhism

Bidia Dandarovich Dandaron (Russian: Бидия Дандарович Дандарон; 1914–1974), religious name Chitta-Vajra (Russian: Читта-Ваджра, romanized: Čitta-Vadžra), was a Soviet Buryat Buddhist lama, Tibetologist, Buddhologist and translator, known for being the successor of the Balagat movement. A victim of Soviet religious persecution, Dandaron was imprisoned for a total of 15 years throughout his life and died aged 59 in Vydrino Labor Camp.

== Early life ==
Bidia Dandarovich Dandaron was born on 28 December [O.S. 14 December] 1914 in the Ulus of Shalot, Russian Empire (present-day, Russia) to Balzhima Abudueva and Lama Dorzhi Badmaev (Agvan Silnam Tuzol Dorzhi Shob), a Buryat Lama, Tantric teacher, writer, poet and follower of the Balagat movement.

Dandaron had three older half-siblings from his mother's first marriage to Dandar Bazarov, a Herder. Following the death of her first husband, Abudueva lived with her parents and unofficially with Badmaev. Since Abudueva and Badmaev were not married, both Dandaron and his sister Dashid were given the surname of Abudueva's first husband.

Shortly after his birth, Dandaron was recognised by Lama Lubsan Sandan Tsydenov as the new rebirth of the Gyayag (Wylie: rgya yag) Lama, and given the new name ″Vidyadhara″ (Standard Tibetan: རིག་འཛིན་, romanized: Rigdzin). Tsydenov was the founder and leader of the Balagat movement, which espoused that existing monasteries taught a distorted form of Buddhism and encouraged its followers to establish communities away from both monasteries and people in order to revive true tantric practice. Tsydenov refused to allow a delegation from Tibet to relocation Dandaron to the Tibetan capital monastery of Kumbum Monastery. Due to this refusal, Dandaron is a recognized reincarnation in the line of the Gyayag Lamas as part of the “Buryat” branch alongside the ″Tibetan″ branch.^{α}

In July 1921, at age 7, Tsydenov succeed the title of Dharamarāja of the Balagat movement to Dandaron at a ceremony in Shaluta.

== Education ==
Dandaron received his Buddhist education from Tsydenov as well as his father and other local lamas. In 1926, Dandaron began attending secular school in Kizhinga, where he was taught by the writer Khotsa Namsaraev. In 1929, Dandaron began attending school in Kyakhta, where he meet his future wife Elizaveta Andreevna Shulunova.

In 1933, Dandaron moved to Leningrad (present-day, Saint Petersburg), and studied aeronautical engineering at Leningrad Civil Aviation Institute. In 1936, Dandaron met Agvan Dorzhiev at Datsan Gunzechoinei. Following Dorzhiev's recommendation Dandaron began attending the Tibetan language lectures of Andrey Vostrikov at Leningrad State University.

== Religious life and persecution ==
On 3 June 1937, Dandaron was arrested for counter-revolutionary activities and charged under Article 58 and sentenced to 10 years imprisonment. During his imprisonment Dandaron was tortured and contracted tuberculosis. On 4 February 1943, Dandaron was released due to illness and returned to Buryatia and resumed his religious studies. In 1948, Dandaron moved to Tomsk Oblast in an attempt to escape State surrivillance, but was subsequently arrested again on 10 November 1949 on charges of espionage. During his second imprisonment Dandaron met Vasily Seseman and studied together. Dandaron also studied Tibetan with Lamas from territories occupied by the USSR. In 1956, Dandaron was released with political rehabilitation and travelled to Moscow and Leningrad to find employment at an academic institution, but was unable to find work. During this time Dandaron met with George de Roerich.

Pyotr Khadalov, then head of the Buryat-Mongolian Research Institute of Culture in Ulan-Ude, invited Dandaron to join the institute. Dandaron returned to Buryatia in 1957 and began working at the institute He wrote extensively on Tibetan studies and translated religious and historical literature of Tibet into Russian, publishing over 30 articles and other works. His religious works came to public as samizdat. From 1956 to 1972, Dandaron published more than 30 works on Buddhism and Tibetan culture.

=== Dandaron’s Sangha ===
From the mid-1960s to the early 1970s, young people began travelling to Buryatia to receive Dandaron's Buddhist teachings. Dandaron's students were informally called "Dandaron’s Sangha", and included Alexander Piatigorsky, Linnart Mäll, Margarita Albedil, Yuri Parfionovich and Oktiabrina Volkova.

== Final imprisonment and death ==
In August 1972, Dandaron was arrested and charged under Article 227-1^{β} and Article 147-3^{γ} of the RSFSR Criminal Code. Dandaron was accused of leading a Buddhist "sect" in which he led his followers in "bloody sacrifices", "ritual copulations", and "attempts to murder or beat former members of the sect who had wanted to break with it", and of having "contacts with foreign countries and international Zionism". From 18 to 25 December 1973, Danadaron was tried by Oktyabrsky District Court in Ulan-Ude. Despite the majority of the charges being dropped, Dandaron was convicted for acting as a "guru" to the so-called "Dandaron group" and was sentenced to 5 years at a corrective labor colony as well as the confiscation of property.

Dandaron was imprisoned at Vydrino Labor Camp near Lake Baikal, in the Buryat Autonomous Soviet Socialist Republic (present-day, Buryatia). During imprisonment Dandaron continued to write about, teach and practice Buddhism. Dandaron died aged 59 on 26 October 1974 at Vydrino Labor Camp.

== Personal life ==
In 1931, Dandaron married Elizaveta Andreevna Shulunova, a Buryat student at Leningrad Medical Institute. The couple had a son in 1936. Shulunova died sometime during Dandaron's first imprisonment, whilst travelling from Leningrad to Ulan-Ude.

In March 1943, Dandaron married his second wife Zundyma Tsydypova, a Buryat midwife. Dandaron and Tsydypova had several children.

== Publications ==
- Dandaron, Bidia (1960), Opisanie tibetskikh rukopiseĭ i ksilografov buriatskogo kompleksnogo nauchno-issledovatelśkogo instituta [Description of Tibetan manuscripts and xylographs of the Buryat Complex Research Institute], Moscow: zd-vo Vostochnoĭ Lit-ry.
- Semichov, B. V.; Parfionovich, Yu. M.; Dandaron, B. D.; State Publishing House of Foreign and National Dictionaries. (1963). Parfionovich, Yu. M. (ed.). Kratkij tibetsko-russkij slovarʹ : 21 000 slov [Short Tibetan-Russian dictionary: 21000 words]. Moscow: State Publishing House of Foreign and National Dictionaries; Academy of Sciences of the USSR, Siberian Department, Buryat Complex Scientific Research Institute.
- Dandaron, Bidia (1965). Opisanie tibetskikh rukopiseĭ i ksilografov buriatskogo kompleksnogo nauchno-issledovatelśkogo instituta, vyp. II [Description of Tibetan manuscripts and xylographs of the Buryat Complex Research Institute, vol. II]. Moscow: zd-vo Vostochnoĭ Lit-ry.
- Sumba-Khambo (1972). History of Kukunor, Titled as "Beautiful Notes of a Brahma Song" (in Russian). Translated from the Tibetan by B.D. Dandaron. Moscow.

=== Posthumous publications ===
- Dandaron, Bidia (1995). Montlevich, Vladimir Mikhailovich (ed.). 99 pisem o buddizme i lûbvi 1956-1959 [99 letters about Buddhism and love 1956-1959]. Saint Petersburg: Datsan Gunzechoinei.
- Dandaron, Bidia (1995). Chernaya tetrad. O chetyrekh blagorodnykh istinakh Buddy [Black Notebook. About the Buddha’s Four Noble Truths, in Russian]. Saint Petersburg: Datsan Gunzechoinei. hdl:11222.digilib/136885.

== Notes ==
^α Dandaron holds the title of ″14th (Buryat) Gyayag Lama Bidiadara Dandaron″ (Wylie: bidya dha ra), alongside ″14th (Tibetan) Gyayag Lama Lozang Tenpay Gyatsen″ (Wylie: blo bzang bstan pa’i rgyal mtshan; 1916–1990) of the Tibetan branch.
^β Article 227: Infringement of Person and Rights of Citizens under Appearance of Performing Religious Ceremonies.
^γ Article 147-3: Swindling Causing Significant Lose to Victim or Committed by an Especially Dangerous Recidivist.

== Sources ==
- Dandaron, Bidia Dandarovich, an entry in: The modern encyclopedia of Russian and Soviet history, Volume 7. Bruce F. Adams (Ed.), Academic International Press, 2006, ISBN 0-87569-142-0, ISBN 978-0-87569-142-8 pages 177–179
- John Snelling. Buddhism in Russia. Element, 1993. ISBN 1-85230-332-8, ISBN 978-1-85230-332-7 pages 260–264
- A Chronicle of human rights in the USSR., issues 7–12, Khronika Press., 1974 (page 52 Dandaron Necrology)
