= Harold C. Case =

American university president and clergyman

Harold Claude Case
- Born: 1902; Cottonwood Falls, Kansas
- Died: February 20, 1972 (aged 69–70)
- Education: Baker University; Boston University School of Theology; Northwestern University; Harvard University
- Occupations: academic administrator preacher
- Spouse: Phyllis Kirk
- Children: Harold Robert Case; Rosanna Case

Harold Claude Case (1902 – February 20, 1972) was an American academic administrator and Methodist preacher. He served as president of Boston University from 1951 to 1967 and was later named acting president of Whittier College.

== Biography ==
Born in Cottonwood Falls, Kansas, Case earned degrees from Baker University and the Boston University School of Theology. He also studied at Northwestern University and Harvard University. After his ordination, he led congregations in Glencoe, Illinois, Pasadena, California, Topeka, Kansas, and Scranton, Pennsylvania. Case was named Boston University president on January 16, 1951, and inaugurated on June 3. During his sixteen years in office, dorms were expanded in West Campus. Other construction projects included the building of the Warren Towers, the BU Law Tower, the George Sherman Union, the Mugar Memorial Library, and the Boston Medical Center. In total, Case oversaw the construction of 68 buildings. Along with a desire to transform Boston University into a leading research institution, Case further changed campus culture from one that primarily attracted male, commuter students, to one that became more gender-integrated and residential. Boston University established the Harold C. Case Scholarship in his honor upon Case's retirement in 1967. Case Gym, constructed in 1972, was named in his honor. In 1970, Case was awarded an honorary Doctor of Laws (LL.D.) degree from Whittier College.

After a one-year stint at Whittier College, Case traveled to Africa and Asia, giving talks on educational problems facing new schools. He died at his home in Annisquam, Massachusetts on February 20, 1972, aged 69.

Case was married to Phyllis Kirk, with whom he had two children, Harold Robert and Rosanna Case.
