= Mark Petrov =

- Марк Евгеньевич Петров
- Born: 1933; Leningrad
- Died: 2004 (aged 70–71); Vyborg
- Education: Leningrad Higher School of Art and Industry
- Occupation: graphic design

Mark Petrov (1933–2004) was a Soviet artist and graphic designer.

== Biography ==
Mark Petrov was born in Leningrad in 1993. He studied in Leningrad Secondary Art School together with Aleksandr Arefjev, Alexander Traugot, Rodion Gudzenko, and Sholom Shvarts. He's considered a part of the so-called Arefiev's circle, an informal group of Leningrad-based artists. He also was a friend of the poet Roald Mandelstam. In 1949, he was accepted to the Leningrad Higher School of Art and Industry.

He underwent internship in his alma mater and later worked in the Leningrad Art Foundation and the Leningrad Branch of the Art Fund of the RSFSR (from 1962 to 1972). There he befriended Eugene Mikhnov-Voytenko, a notable Leningrad non-conformist artist. Petrov was laid off for being a part of an underground buddhist group of Bidia Dandaron. Following the criminal proceedings for joining a religious and philosophy group, he moved to Vyborg. He died there in 2004.

== Works ==
Artworks and design works of Mark Petrov are included in the collections of the State Russian Museum collection, the Tsarskoe Selo Collection State Museum, the Museum of Nonconformist Art; some are privately owned.

=== Design ===
Petrov was among the key Soviet minimalist designers of his time and notanbly influenced the Leningrad tradition of design. His works were a notable part of the visual style of the city.

Petrov worked on advertisement posters and logotypes for Aeroflot, posters and tickets for the Leningrad Zoo, covers for gramophone records, postcards, decorative paper, industry exhibitions catalogues, souvenir matchboxes with Leningrad's landmarks, etc. He also developed the first Leningrad Metro scheme which serves as basis for modern metro schemes of the city.

=== Art ===
For most of his career, Petrov combined design with art practices. His abstract works researched the conflict between an individual and the state as well as the concept of violence as the norm of the Soviet society.

Petrov's best known works were created during Khrushchev's Ottepel and Brezhnev's times. His artistic style was influenced by cubist art and abstract works by Mark Rothko, Pavel Filonov, and Kazimir Malevich. Nikolai Blagodatov, a known collector of nonconformist art considered Petrov the successor of the 1920s Leningrad art tradition. Eugene Orlov, the curator of Petrov's postmortem exhibitions, emphasized that the artist was among the founding fathers of nonconformist art in Leningrad.

== Exhibitions ==
- 2010 — Towards the unknown, the Museum of Nonconformist Art, Saint Petersburg
- 2011 — In the kingdom of formal figures, NameGallery, Saint Petersburg
- 2013 — Hot Cold Pavilion, Etagi Loft, Saint Petersburg
- 2013 — Industrial Graphics, Formula Gallery, Saint Petersburg
- 2018 — In the search of contemporary style. The experience of Leningrad-based artists (the late 1950s to the mid-1960s), Marble Palace of the State Russian Museum
- 2015 — The Art of Hopelessness, the Museum of Nonconformist Art, Saint Petersburg
