= David Zilberman =

David Zilberman may refer to:

- David Zilberman (wrestler) (born 1982), Canadian Olympic freestyle wrestler
- David B. Zilberman (1938–1977), Russian-American philosopher and sociologist
- David Zilberman (economist) (born 1947), Israeli-American economist and professor
