= Lee McIntyre =

American philosopher

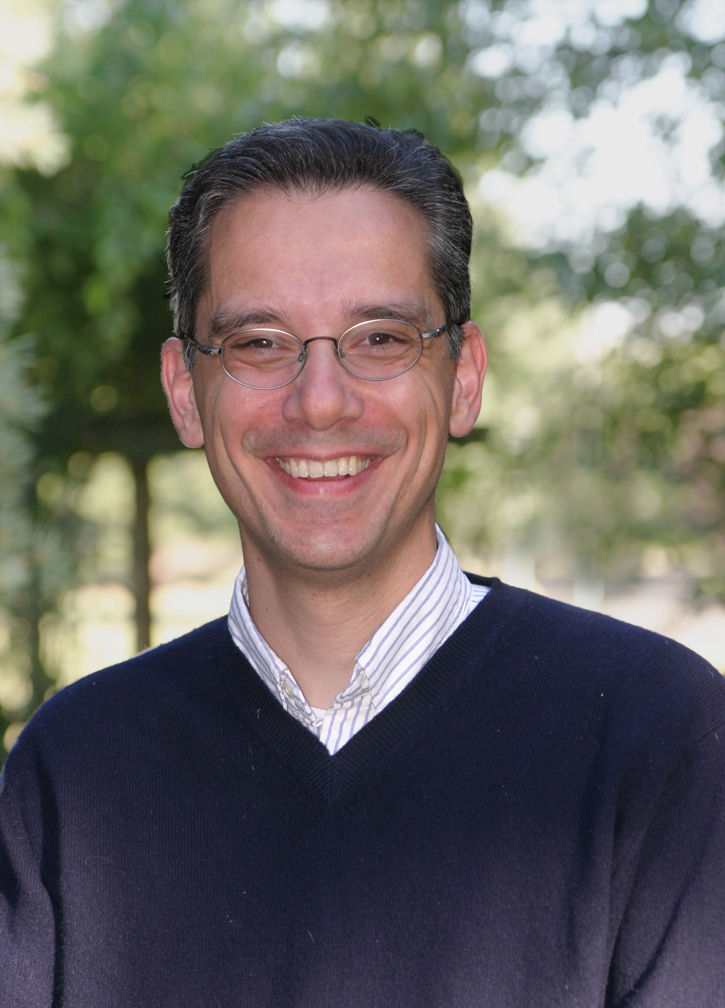
- Born: Lee Cameron McIntyre; 1962 (age 63–64); Portland, Oregon, US
- Education: Wesleyan University (BA); University of Michigan (MA, PhD)
- Occupations: Philosopher, author, educator
- Writing career
- Period: 1994–present
- Genres: Non-fiction, crime fiction, thriller
- Website: leemcintyrebooks.com

Lee Cameron McIntyre (born 1962) is an American author, researcher, and academic. He is a research fellow at the Center for Philosophy and History of Science at Boston University and an instructor in ethics at Harvard Extension School. He has published numerous nonfiction book and articles on the philosophy of the social sciences and attempts to undermine science. In 2023, he became a fellow with the Committee for Skeptical Inquiry.

== Early life ==
McIntyre was born in 1962 in Portland, Oregon. He earned a B.A. in philosophy of social science from Wesleyan University and an M.A. and Ph.D. in philosophy from the University of Michigan. McIntyre's doctoral dissertation was on the status of law-like explanations in the social sciences.

== Career ==
From 1991 to 1992, McIntyre was a research associate at the Boston University Center for Philosophy and History of Science. In 1992, he was a visiting lecturer at Tufts Experimental College. He was an assistant professor of philosophy at Colgate University from 1993 to 1999. McIntyre was a visiting scholar at the Santa Fe Institute in 1997.

In 2000, McIntyre became a special assistant to the executive dean of the faculty of arts and sciences at Harvard University. In addition, he was an instructor of ethics at the Harvard Extension School and was the executive director of the Institute for Quantitative Social Science at Harvard University. He is a research fellow at the Boston University Center for Philosophy and History of Science.

McIntyre was an associate editor in the research department of the Federal Reserve Bank of Boston. In 2023, he became a fellow with the Committee for Skeptical Inquiry.

== Body of work ==
=== Nonfiction books ===
Many of McIntyre's nonfiction books are concerned with the nature of scientific knowledge generation and validation. These include Explaining Explanation: Essays in the Philosophy of the Special Sciences, Laws and Explanation in the Social Sciences, Dark Ages: The Case for a Science of Human Behavior, and Respecting Truth: Willful Ignorance in the Internet Age.

In his 2018 book Post-Truth, he explored the environment and "atmosphere" surrounding the concept of post-truth. Carlos Lozada, reviewer for The Washington Post, wrote that Post-Truth "convincingly tracks how intelligent-design proponents and later climate deniers drew from postmodernism to undermine public perceptions of evolution and climate change."

In his 2019 book, The Scientific Attitude: defending science from denial, fraud, and pseudoscience, McIntyre describes scientific thinking and the demarcation problem as a willingness to revise an opinion after discovering new evidence. Publishers Weekly said that the book "articulates why the pursuit of scientific truths, even if inevitably flawed and subject to human error, matters." Harriet Hall reviewed the book for Skeptical Inquirer Magazine and wrote that McIntyre tries to explain science by explaining what it is not. The Scientific Attitude was also reviewed in The Guardian.

McIntyre was also the co-editor of three anthologies: Readings in the Philosophy of Social Science, Philosophy of Chemistry, and Philosophy of Chemistry, 2nd edition.

=== Essays and articles ===
McIntyre is the author of numerous philosophical essays that have appeared in Biology and Philosophy, The Chronicle of Higher Education, The Humanist, The New York Times, Perspectives on Science, Philosophy of the Social Sciences, Synthese, Teaching Philosophy, Theory and Decision, and The Times Higher Education Supplement. New Statesman published his article, "Why Donald Trump and Vladimir Putin Lie... and Why They Are So Good At It" in January 2018. His "How to Reverse the Assault on Science" was published in the Scientific American blog in 2019. McIntyre's article "Flat Earthers and the Rise of Science Denial in America" was reprinted as the cover story of Newsweek on July 14, 2019.

=== Fiction ===
McIntyre also writes suspense fiction. His novel The Sin Eater is a thriller published in 2019.

=== Presentations ===
Michael Shermer invited McIntyre to present on his program Science Salon # 77: The Scientific Attitude: Defending Science from Denial, Fraud, and Pseudoscience. On March 17–20, 2021, McIntyre presented at the first Global Congress on Scientific Thinking and Action; in his presentation, "Science Denialism", he discussed his conversations with flat earth believers, which would become the basis of his book, How to Talk to a Science Denier. He stressed the importance of face-to-face conversations and gaining the trust of the people you are trying to convince.

== Awards and recognition ==
His book Post-Truth was named book of the week by Fareed Zakaria of CNN. It was also the winner of the CHOICE Outstanding Academic Titles for 2018.

== Selected publications ==
=== Book ===
Year	Title	Publisher	ISBN
1994	Readings in the Philosophy of Social Science. (co-editor with Michael Martin)	MIT Press	ISBN 9780262631518
1996	Laws and Explanation in the Social Sciences: Defending a Science of Human Behavior	Westview Press	ISBN 0813328284
2006	Philosophy of Chemistry: Synthesis of a New Discipline. (co-editor with Davis Baird and Eric Scerri)	Springer Publishing	ISBN 1402032560
2006	Dark Ages: The Case for a Science of Human Behavior	Bradford Books	ISBN 0262512548
2012	Explaining Explanation: Essays in the Philosophy of the Special Sciences	University Press of America	ISBN 0761858695
2014	Philosophy of Chemistry: Growth of a New Discipline, 2nd ed.. (co-editor with Eric Scerri).	Springer Publishing	ISBN 9401793638
2015	Respecting Truth: Willful Ignorance in the Internet Age	Routledge	ISBN 9781138888814
2017	The Routledge Companion to Philosophy of Social Science	Routledge	ISBN 9780367871574
2018	Post-Truth	MIT Press	ISBN 9780262535045
2019	The Scientific Attitude: Defending Science from Denial, Fraud, and Pseudoscience	MIT Press	ISBN 0262039834
2019	The Sin Eater	Braveship Books	ISBN 1640620885
2019	Philosophy of Science: A Contemporary Introduction	Routledge	ISBN 978-1138331518
2021	How to Talk to a Science Denier: Conversations with Flat Earthers, Climate Deniers, and Others Who Defy Reason	MIT Press	ISBN 0262046105
2021	The Art of Good and Evil	Braveship Books	ISBN 978-1640621473
2022	A Companion to Public Philosophy	Wiley-Blackwell	ISBN 978-1119635222
2023	On Disinformation: How to Fight for Truth and Protect Democracy	MIT Press	ISBN 978-0262546300

=== Articles ===
- "Editorial Introduction: Empiricism in the Philosophy of Social Science". Synthese. vol. 97, no. 2 (1993): 159.
- "Complexity and Social Scientific Laws". Synthese. vol. 97, no. 2 (1993): 209–227.
- "The Case for the Philosophy of Chemistry" with Eric R. Scerri. Synthese. vol. 111, no. 33 (1997): 213–232.
- "The Dark Ages of Social Science". The Humanist (2007).
- "Making Philosophy Matter—or Else". The Chronicle of Higher Education (December 11, 2011).
- "The Attack on Truth". The Chronicle of Higher Education (June 8, 2015).
- "The Price of Denialism". The New York Times (November 7, 2015)
- "Why Donald Trump and Vladimir Putin Lie... and Why They Are So Good at It". New Statesman (January 3, 2018)
- "Flat Earthers, and the rise of science denial in America". Newsweek (May 14, 2019).
- "How to Reverse the Assault on Science". Scientific American. (May 22, 2019).
