= Linnart Mäll =

Estonian historian, orientalist and politician

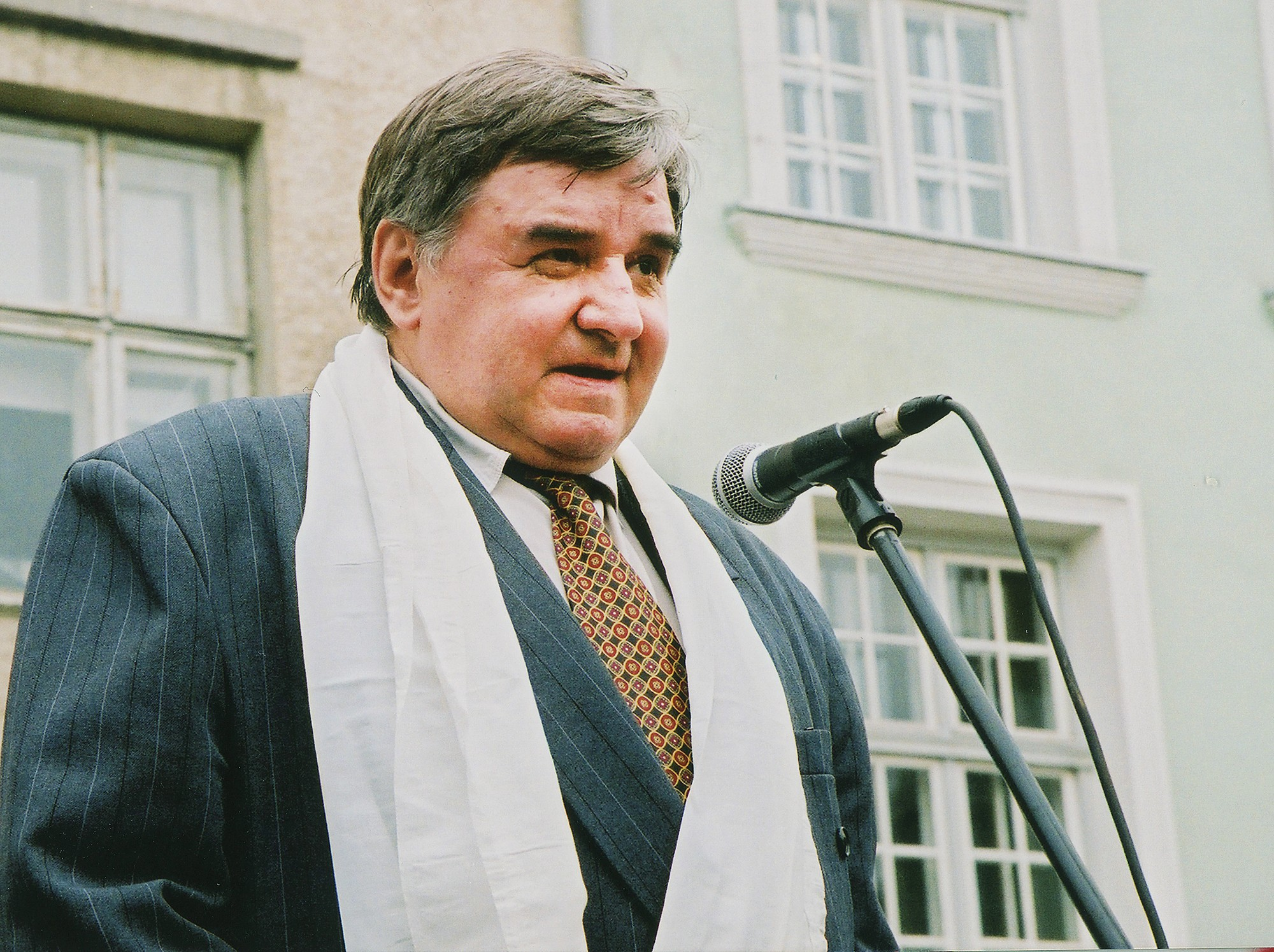
Mäll in 2001

Linnart Mäll (7 June 1938 – 14 February 2010) was an Estonian historian, orientalist, translator and politician.

== Biography ==
Born in Tallinn, Estonia, Mäll graduated from the University of Tartu in 1962 with a major in general history. He followed graduation with postgraduate studies at the Institute of Oriental Studies of the Russian Academy of Sciences at the USSR Academy of Sciences (1964–1966) and Department of History, University of Tartu (1966–1969); 1985 Cand. Hist. (PhD) in history, PhD thesis "Ashtasāhasrikā Prajñāpāramitā as a Historical Source".

Since 1994 he was Head of the Centre for Oriental Studies, senior research fellow, Department of History, Faculty of Philosophy, University of Tartu. From 1969 to 1973 he served as lecturer of the Chair of General History at Tartu State University. Later he was dismissed for anti-communist views and subsequently worked for ten years as engineer of the Cabinet for Oriental Studies. He was partly rehabilitated in 1983 and promoted to head of the Laboratory for History and Semiotics (1983–1991). He later served as head of the Laboratory for Oriental Studies (1991–1994).

His main research fields included: Buddhist Mahāyāna texts, Buddhist mythology, classical Indian literature and culture, classical Chinese texts, Tibetan Buddhist texts and the history of small nations and peoples.

He was one of the first who applied the methods of semiotic analysis for investigation of Buddhist texts and other texts of classical Oriental thought. Mäll was one of the central figures of the branch of oriental studies in the Tartu-Moscow Semiotic School in 1960–70s. In the 1990s he worked on the elaboration of the conception of humanistic base texts; since 1998 the initiator and head of the research project "Humanistic base texts in the history of mankind"; and author of ten books and over one hundred academic articles.

Mäll was inspired to become a Buddhist and buddhologist by well-known Estonian theologian and philosopher Uku Masing in the early 1960s. He later studied under and worked together with several Buddhist and non-Buddhist teachers and scholars including Nikolai Konrad, Alexander Piatigorsky, Oktiabrina Volkova, Youri Parfionovich, Lev Menshikov and Lama Bidia Dandaron. He was a teacher and spiritual master for many Estonian Buddhists and orientalists of the younger generation. In the 1990s he established close ties with The Dalai Lama and served as the main organizer of both of his visits to Estonia (1991 and 2001). Mäll was the founder and director of the first Mahāyāna Institute (which existed from 1991 to 1994).

He was awarded the Order of the White Star, IV degree in 2001, and the Medal of Freedom of the Government of the Chechen Republic of Ichkeria in exile in March 2004.

Mäll died of cancer in Tartu on 14 February 2010.

== Academic associations ==
His membership in the academic associations is as follows:

- Estonian Oriental Society, founder and president in 1988–2001, since 2001 honorary president;
- American Oriental Society;
- Learned Estonian Society;
- Academic Baltic-German Cultural Society in Tartu;
- Academic Historical Society;
- Estonian Writers' Association and
- Estonian Tibetan Cultural Society, honorary member.

== Other groups ==
- Dr. Mäll was one of the founders and first chairman of the Unrepresented Nations and Peoples Organization, 1991–1993; *Member of the Estonian Congress and Estonian Committee (Estonian: Eesti Komitee), 1990–1992;
- member of the Estonian Constitutional Assembly, 1991–1992;
- Vice Chairman of the Estonian National Independence Party, 1992–1994;
- founder and president of the Estonian Paneuropean Union since 1992.

== See also ==
- Buddhism in Estonia
- Uku Masing
