= Vydrino =

Vydrino Выдрино
- Settlement
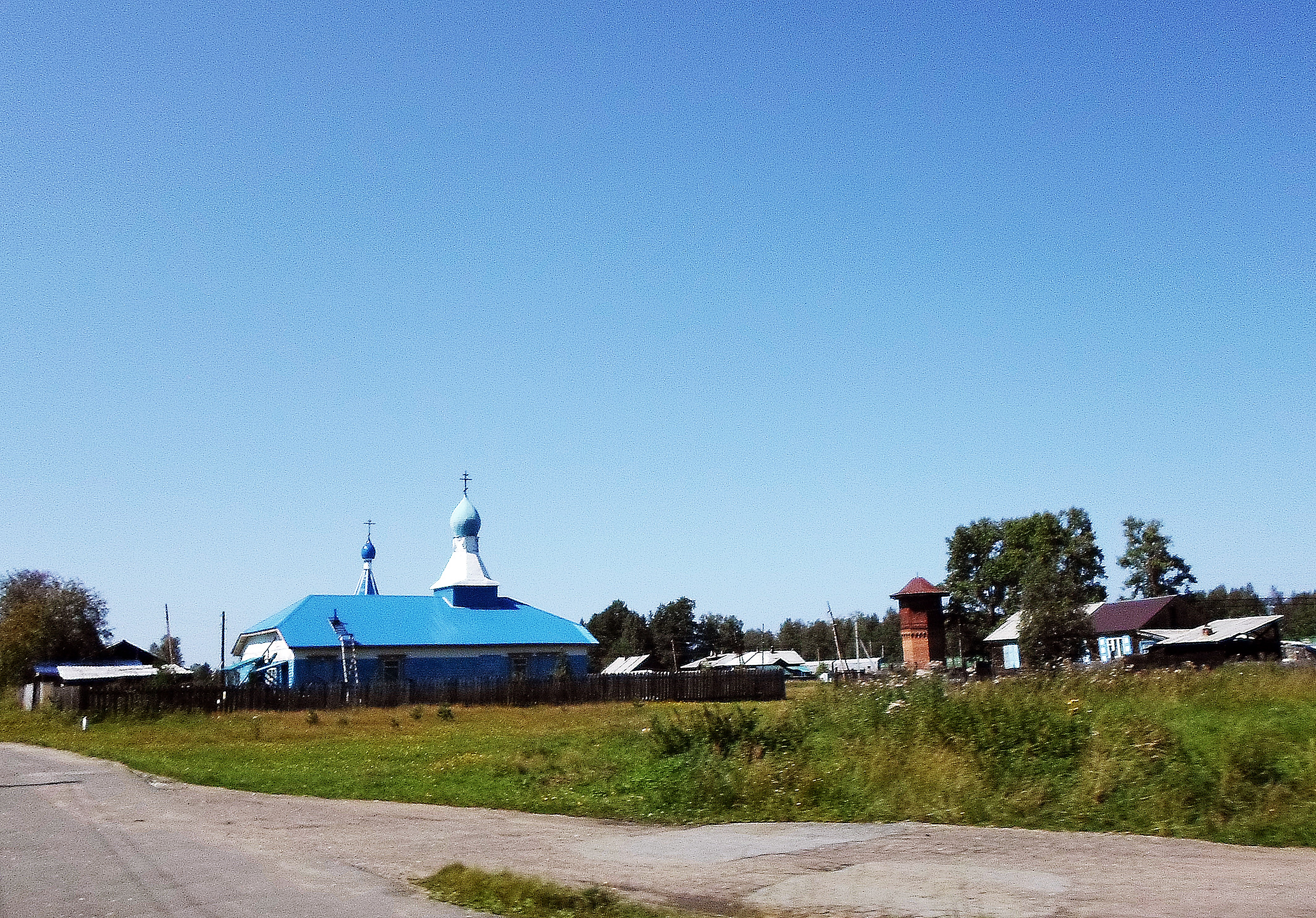

- Location within Republic of Buryatia Location within Russia
- Coordinates: 51°27′N 104°38′E
- Country: Russia
- Region: Republic of Buryatia
- District: Kabansky District
- Time zone: UTC+8:00

Vydrino (Russian: Выдрино) is a rural locality (a settlement) in Kabansky District, Republic of Buryatia, Russia. The population was 796 as of 2010. There are 8 streets.

== Geography ==
Vydrino was established in 1902. It is located 149 km southwest of Kabansk (the district's administrative centre) by road. Kedrovaya is the nearest rural locality. In 1974, the famous Buddhist teacher and scholar Bidia Dandaron died in a Prison colony close to Vydrino.
