= Odesa State Environmental University =

Public university in Odesa, Ukraine

Coordinates: 46.3999°N 30.7415°E

- Одеський державний екологічний університет
- Active: 1932–2024
- Affiliations: Odesa University (since 2024), Ministry of Education and Science of Ukraine
- Rector: Sergiy Stepanenko
- Location: Odesa, Ukraine
- Website: odeku.edu.ua
- Location within Odesa Oblast Location within Ukraine

The Odesa State Environmental University (Ukrainian: Одеський державний екологічний університет, romanized: Odeskyi derzhavnyi ekolohichnyi universytet) was a university in Odesa, Ukraine. Since July 2024, part of ONU as its faculty.

== History ==
The university was founded on May 1, 1932 in Kharkiv as the Kharkiv Institute of Hydrometeorological Engineering. In the beginning of World War II the institute was evacuated to Ashgabat until August 1944. On July 4, 1944, it was relocated from Ashgabat to Odesa and renamed the Odesa Hydrometeorological Institute (OHMI). In 2001, the Odesa Hydrometeorological Institute received a new name - Odesa State Environmental University.

== Structure ==
=== Institutes and faculties ===
- Hydrometeorological Institute;
- Faculty of Ecology and Economics;
- Faculty of Conservation;
- Faculty of Computer Science;
- Faculty of Master's and Postgraduate Studies;
- Correspondence department.

=== Colleges ===
- Odesa College of Computer Technology (formerly Odesa Machine Building College);
- Kharkiv Hydrometeorological College;
- Kherson Hydrometeorological College.

=== Other ===
- Preparatory department;
- Center for Postgraduate Education;
- Center of Master's Training at the Naval Hydrophysical Institute of the National Academy of National Affairs of Ukraine;
- Department of Military Training (Ministry of Defence).

Since 1993, the university has had a three-stage system of training specialists.

== Graduates ==
The University has produced more than 30,000 certified specialists. Since 1953, the university has been training foreign nationals; 1,600 engineers, researchers, and trainees. More than 200 personnel officers who are graduates of the university serve in the Armed Forces of Ukraine.

=== Notable alumni ===
- Olena Khomrova.
- Ivan Mishyn.
- David B. Zilberman.

== See also ==
List of universities in Ukraine
