= Howard Bernard Gotlieb =

American archivist

Howard B. Gotlieb
- Born: October 24, 1926; Bangor, Maine, U.S
- Died: December 1, 2005 (aged 79); Boston, Massachusetts, U.S.
- Education: Ph.D., Oxford University
- Occupation: Archivist

Howard Bernard Gotlieb, Ph.D. (October 24, 1926 – December 1, 2005) was an American archivist, and the founding director of Special Collections at Boston University, which was established as an archive center in 1963. In 2003, the center was renamed The Howard Gotlieb Archival Research Center in his honor. Gotlieb acquired substantial holdings to the archive from individuals who played a significant part in the fields of journalism, literature, film, and political and religious movements. The archive includes historical documents donated by individuals such as letters written by Bette Davis, important papers from Martin Luther King Jr. donated before the Selma to Montgomery marches, jokes written by Groucho Marx, Fred Astaire’s tap dancing shoes, hundreds of documents from Dan Rather, and notes for a book first titled "Great White" that was later changed to "Jaws" written by Peter Benchley.

Gotlieb worked at Yale prior to becoming the director of Special Collections at Boston University in 1963. Since that time, the BU's collection has grown to over 140,000 rare books.

== Early life and education ==
Gotlieb was born October 24, 1926, in a small Jewish community in Bangor, Maine. His parents were Maurice and Eva (née Goldstein) Gotlieb. He collected stamps as a child and discovered archival work as a member of the US Army Signal Corps in postwar Germany, where his job was gathering the papers of Nazi officials.

Gotlieb earned a bachelor's degree in history from George Washington University, in Washington, DC, a master's degree in history from Columbia University in New York and a doctorate in international relations from Oxford.

== Career ==
After working for several years as a foreign correspondent for a small press agency in Europe, Gotlieb was hired by Yale as a teaching associate in history and as an archivist of historical manuscripts.

He then worked as a curator of historical manuscripts at Yale and published a biography of William Beckford. He moved to work at Boston University in 1963 where he became founding director of Special Collections.

== Howard Gotlieb Archival Research Center ==
Boston University's rare book and manuscript collections are held in the Howard Gotlieb Archival Research Center, formerly called the Twentieth Century Archives. The Research Center was renamed in his honor on the 40th anniversary of his appointment. It is housed in the Mugar Library and is open to the public for research and viewing. Gotlieb's extensive correspondence, said to fill 100 filing cabinets, is being catalogued for availability by researchers.

== Death ==
Gotlieb died December 1, 2005, at a Boston hospital at the age of 79. According to the university, the cause of death was complications from surgery. Private funeral services were held where he was buried in Mount Auburn Cemetery in Cambridge, Massachusetts.
