= Alfred I. Tauber =

American philosopher (born 1947)

Alfred I. Tauber (born 1947) is an American philosopher and historian of science, who, from 1993 to 2010, served as director of the Boston University Center for Philosophy and History of Science at Boston University.

Tauber has published extensively on 19th and 20th century biomedicine, the development of modern immunology, the doctor-patient relationship, and contemporary science studies. He is the 2008 recipient of the Science Medal from the University of Bologna in Bologna, Italy, and Doctor of Philosophy honoris causa from the University of Haifa in Haifa, Israel, in 2011. Since 2013, he has been chairman of the board of governors of the University of Haifa.

== Research ==
Tauber's key publications fall into three areas: He published the first philosophical study of contemporary immunology, The Immune Self: Theory or Metaphor? (Cambridge 1994), which became the second monograph of a quartet tracing the theoretical development of this science. In these works and various critical papers he has argued that the prevailing self/nonself paradigm inadequately models immune tolerance and over-emphasizes host defense at the expense of cooperative ecological relationships. By advocating a cognitive view of immune functions, he presents physiological autoimmunity and symbiotic relationships as alternate immune frameworks for modeling normal immunity. His Immunity: The Evolution of an Idea (Oxford 2017) summarizes this interpretation.

In medical ethics, Tauber has focused on the doctor-patient relationship: In Confessions of a Medicine Man (MIT 1999), he promoted the foundational status of the ethics of medicine and thus firmly placed science and technology in the employ of the moral mandate of health care. Patient Autonomy and the Ethics of Responsibility (MIT Press 2005) extended this argument with a description of "relational autonomy" to define the moral status of the patient, coupled with advocacy of patient-centered medicine.

His third area of interest has centered on the replacement of reified notions of science with an epistemology thoroughly melded with human-centered interests and intentions. In seeking a comprehensive understanding of scientific practice and application, Tauber argues for a "moral epistemology", a philosophy that builds upon the collapse of the fact/value distinction to define the interplay of various values in the diversity of science's methodologies and interpretations. More specifically, he is concerned with the nature of knowing that translates objective knowledge into personal meaning. His Thoreau and the Moral Agency of Knowing (California 2001) illustrates the composite character of personal identity that such an approach presents, one in which moral agency broadly defines personal identity. These studies have been extended in critiques of psychoanalytic portrayals of the ego that place Freud in imagined dialogues with philosophers of his own era in Freud, the Reluctant Philosopher (Princeton 2010) and with Adorno, Heidegger, and Wittgenstein in Requiem for the Ego (Stanford 2013).

While primarily teaching and writing in science studies and bioethics, Tauber originally trained as a biochemist and hematologist and has published over 125 research publications in biochemistry and cell biology.

Since 2004, Tauber has held a part-time visiting professorship at Tel Aviv University in Tel Aviv, Israel, where he teaches in the Cohn Institute for the History of Science and Ideas.

== Personal ==
Tauber is married to Paula Fredriksen and has 5 grandchildren.

== Selected books ==
- Immunity: The Evolution of an Idea, New York: Oxford University Press, 2017.
- Requiem for the Ego. Freud and the Origins of Postmodernism, Stanford: Stanford University Press, 2013.
- Freud, the Reluctant Philosopher, Princeton: Princeton University Press, 2010.
- Science and the Quest for Meaning, Waco, TX: Baylor University Press, 2009.
- Patient Autonomy and the Ethics of Responsibility, Cambridge: The MIT Press, 2005.
- Henry David Thoreau and the Moral Agency of Knowing. Berkeley and Los Angeles: University of California Press, 2001. (Paperback 2003)
- Confessions of a Medicine Man: An Essay in Popular Philosophy Cambridge: The MIT Press, A Bradford Book, 1999 (Paperback 2000). Awarded "Outstanding Academic Title" by Choice (journal of the American Library Association) and First Prize, Allied Health category, by the American Medical Writers Association. Korean translation 2004; Spanish translation, 2011.
- Podolsky, S. H. and Tauber, A. I. Generation of Diversity. Clonal Selection Theory and the Rise of Molecular Immunology, Cambridge: Harvard University Press.
- The Immune Self: Theory or Metaphor? New York and Cambridge: Cambridge University Press, 1994 (Paperback 1996). Italian translation, L'immunologia Dell'io, Milano: McGraw Hill Libri Italia, 1999.
- Gourko, H., Williamson, D.I. and Tauber, A.I. (Edited, translated, and annotated) The Evolutionary Biology Papers of Elie Metchnikoff. Dordrecht: Kluwer Academic Publishers, 2000.
- Tauber A.I. and Chernyak L. Metchnikoff and the Origins of Immunology: From Metaphor to Theory New York: Oxford University Press, 1991.

== See also ==
- American philosophy
- List of American philosophers
- Philosophers of science
