= Alexander Piatigorsky =

Russian philosopher

Alexander Moiseyevich Piatigorsky
- Александр Моисеевич Пятигорский
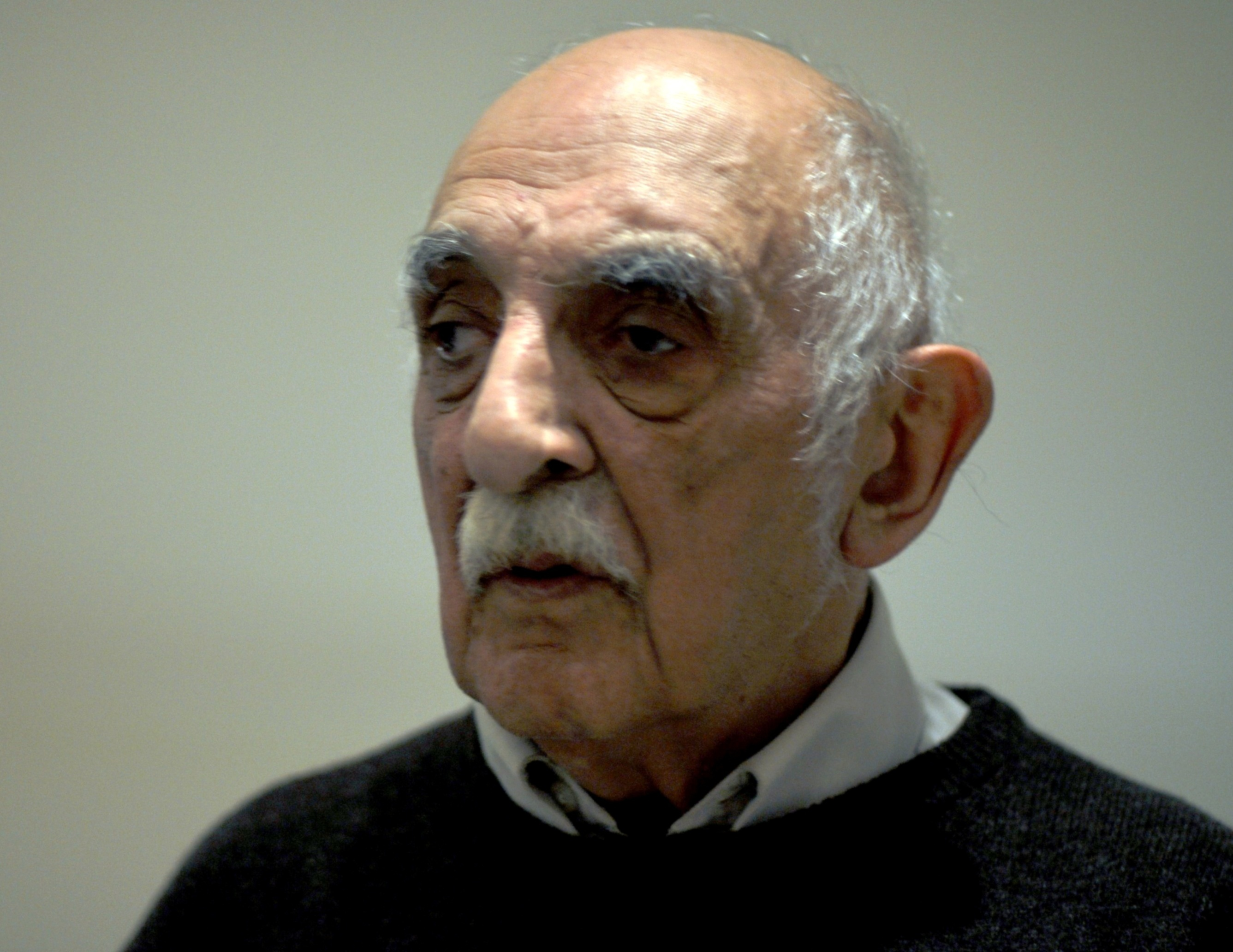
- Alexander Piatigorsky in 2009
- Born: 30 January 1929; Moscow, Soviet Union
- Died: 25 October 2009 (aged 80); London, England

Philosophical work
- Era: Contemporary
- School: Analytic
- Main interests: South Asian philosophy and culture, semiotics

Alexander Moiseyevich Piatigorsky (/pjɑːtɪˈɡɔːrski/; Russian: Александр Моисеевич Пятигорский; 30 January 1929 – 25 October 2009) was a Soviet dissident, Russian philosopher, scholar of Indian philosophy and culture, historian, philologist, semiotician, writer. Well-versed in the study of language, he knew Sanskrit, Tamil, Pali, Tibetan, German, Russian, French, Italian and English. In an obituary appearing in the English-language newspaper The Guardian, he was cited as "a man who was widely considered to be one of the more significant thinkers of the age and Russia's greatest philosopher." On Russian television stations he was mourned as "the greatest Russian philosopher."

== Early years ==
Piatigorsky was born in Moscow. His father, Moshe, an engineer and lecturer at the Stalin metallurgical college was sent to a weapons production facility in the Urals (city of Nizhny Tagil) at the outbreak of World War II, where he took up a post as chief engineer in weapons production. Alexander worked in the plant during the war. Being a poor student of mathematics, chemistry and physics, Alexander was expelled from school twice, but at this time he learned Latin and some other languages out of sheer curiosity. He was a voracious reader, and read just about everything he could get his hands on.

== Studying and work in USSR ==
At Moscow State University he studied philosophy, graduating in 1951. He moved to Stalingrad where he taught high-school history before returning to Moscow to join the Institute of Oriental Studies as "a specialist in Tamil languages and Hindu studies." He compiled the first Russian–Tamil dictionary in 1960. In 1963, influenced by Juri Lotman who was working in Tartu University, he was involved with Lotman, Vyacheslav Ivanov, Vladimir Toporov and others, in the establishment of Tartu-Moscow Semiotic School. The School developed the theoretical foundations and nomenclature for a new approach in semiotics for the study of society, consciousness and culture.

In 1964, Piatigorsky's friend, poet Joseph Brodsky, was handed down a five-year sentence of internal exile. The following year, in support of the writers Yuli Daniel and Andrey Sinyavsky, Piatigorsky with other Russian intellectuals:

"...signed a letter deploring the violation of the writers' human rights, and later took part in the first human rights demonstration in Pushkin Square."

His investigations and theoretical observations of the role played by thinking and philosophy in ancient South Asian culture and society were viewed with suspicion by some as a subtly indirect way of attacking the Soviet system. Knowing themselves to be likely targets of KGB surveillance, he and his fellow Indologists would gather in a room of the Moscow Institute of Oriental Studies where they would enter into "fiery debates... in Sanskrit." He was expelled from the Oriental Institute in 1968.

Piatigorsky continued to lecture at the University of Moscow. He pursued his Indological investigations, increasingly dealing with Buddhist thought, and continued with more general work on the metatheory of consciousness, psychology, semiotics and philosophy in general, while collaborating with various Russian philosophers and thinkers outside of Indology. Chief among them was his close friend, philosopher Merab Mamardashvili. Influenced by German Idealism, Mamardashvili was a Deputy Editor of the leading journal, Voprosy Filosofii ("Problems of Philosophy"), and was also a principal representative of the so-called "Moscow School of Methodology." Participants in the Moscow School seminars included: Alexander Zinoviev, Evald Ilyenkov, Georgy Shchedrovitsky, Boris Grushin, Lefebvre, and others. The School is believed by some to be the source of the most important developments in philosophy in the post-War period, rivaling anything done in the Western analytical tradition. The School remains virtually unknown in the West because its members were forced to operate behind the "Iron Curtain" in a context of severely reduced operational visibility and Soviet-style repression. One of his friends was also an indologist and culture theoretician David Zilberman, who in 1968–1972 was a postgraduate student working under prof. Yuri Levada. Together they used to discuss problems of consciousness development. After they both migrated they kept friendship and continued research co-operation till Zilberman's death in July 1977. Piatigorsky's book" Myshlenie i nablyudenie" (Thinking and Observation), published in Riga in 2002, was dedicated to David Zilberman and included an explicit confession of Zilberman's influence on the author's thought.

In 1972, Piatigorsky's Buddhist teacher Dandaron was arrested by Soviet authorities. A number of Dandaron's students were imprisoned. Dandaron was sent to a Soviet labor camp where he perished in 1974. During the same period, Mamardashvili and Piatigorsky co-authored: "Symbol and Consciousness: Metaphysical Discussion of Consciousness, Symbolism and Language" Jerusalem (1982), in Russian. This abstract and complex text, combining Western and Eastern terms, is considered by some to be the most significant philosophical work written in the Russian language. The text:

"...explores the theory of consciousness, and is a kind of philosophical conversation between [Mamardashvili and Piatigorsky], from the respective perspectives of Edmund Husserl's Phenomenology and the Buddhist School of Vijnanavada."

Written in the two years before Piatigorsky left the Soviet Union for Britain in 1974, the manuscript was spirited out of the country by the British-Czech social philosopher Ernest Gellner. It is worth noticing that the text was written in a deteriorating situation of renewed political repression of the Russian intelligentsia by the Soviet state. The 'tightening of restrictions' followed a brief period of relaxation of Soviet controls on intellectual activity which had taken place from the mid-1960s until the early 1970s.

== Leaving Soviet Union and career at SOAS, University of London ==
Departing the Soviet Union in 1974 for Israel, Piatigorsky made his way to Oxford University where he had been invited to give some lectures. But early times in London were severe for his family (at the moment of departure he has some children and pregnant wife). He arrived to London in the summer and had no normal job, he earned only 6.5 pounds a day. He accepted some invitations to lecture, but decided to stay in London. At Oxford he quickly became acquainted with Isaiah Berlin and Leszek Kołakowski. He joined the staff of the School of Oriental and African Studies, The University of London, as lecturer in 1975 with the commendation of Berlin who at one point is reported to have said: "Piatigorsky is quite simply a genius!" It is remarkable that Piatigorski didn't consider himself a dissident, he left Soviet Union just because he was bored, he felt that something was missing there.

While at SOAS, Piatigorsky wrote numerous journal articles and Introductions and chapters to books in various academic fields. He wrote several larger scholarly works including: The Buddhist Philosophy of Thought (1984), Mythological Deliberations (1993), and Who's Afraid of Freemasons? (1997). The work on Freemasonry was a bestselling book on the sociology and philosophy of religious belief. In 1991, he was made Professor of the Ancient History of South Asia, a position from which he retired in 2001 as Emeritus Professor.

During the final two decades of his life, Piatigorsky wrote a number of philosophical novels in Russian, one of which earned him the Andrei Bely prize in 2000. His first, The Philosophy of a Small Street, was published in Moscow in 1994. The book was well-received, further establishing his reputation in Russian intellectual circles, while placing him in the forefront of public consciousness. Remember the Strange Person (1999) and An Ancient Man in the City (2001) followed. As a novelist he joins the select company of those few philosophers who successfully managed to cross over into the world of literature, including Jean-Paul Sartre, Albert Camus, Umberto Eco, and Alexander Zinoviev. He also crossed over successfully into the world of cinema. He was made the subject of 'Philosopher Escaped' (2005) a documentary film directed by Uldis Tirons about the life of a philosopher, and he played "the part of an Indian merchant in his friend Otar Iosseliani's film Hunting Butterflies."

Piatigorsky disliked traditional academic jargon and for most of his life he upheld the principle that scholars should publish as little as possible on the grounds that publishing interrupts thinking. His lecture style was lively and distinctive: he was able to speak with considerable effect about the most abstruse and difficult concepts. Pacing back and forth, smoking, when it was still permitted, he sometimes stopped to observe his cigarette as it burned, pausing before making the next point. He was never known to consult notes. He was married four times and had five children; Galia, Max, Ilya, Veronica and Anna. He died suddenly on 25 October 2009.

== Works ==
- Пятигорский А. М., Рудин С. Тамильско-русский словарь. – М., 1960 (In Russian)
- Пятигорский А. М. Материалы по истории индийской философии. – М., 1962 (In Russian)
- A. Piatigorsky, D. Zilberman The Emergence of Semiotics in India (1976)
- Пятигорский А. М., Мамардашвили М. К. Символ и сознание. Метафизические рассуждения о сознании, символике и языке. – Иерусалим, 1982 (reprinted М., 1997) (In Russian)
- A. Piatigorsky Buddhist Studies: Ancient and Modern (1983)
- A. Piatigorsky The Buddhist philosophy of thought. – Totowa, N. J., 1984
- A. Piatigorsky Mythological Deliberations. – L., 1993
- Пятигорский А. М. Избранные труды. – М., 1996 (In Russian)
- A. Piatigorsky Who’s Afraid of Freemasons? The Phenomenon of Freemasonry. – L., 1997
- A. Piatigorsky The Bhagavat Gita (Element Classic of World Spirituality Editions (1997)
- Пятигорский А. М. Мышление и наблюдение (Рига, 2002) (In Russian)
- Пятигорский А. М. Избранные труды. – М.: 2005 (In Russian)

=== Fiction and essays ===
- Пятигорский А. М. Философия одного переулка (London, 1989, М., 1994) (In Russian)
- Пятигорский А. М. Вспомнишь странного человека (М., 1999) (In Russian)
- Пятигорский А. М. Рассказы и сны. (М., 2001) (In Russian)
- Пятигорский А. М. Древний человек в городе (М., 2001) (In Russian)
- Пятигорский А. М. Непрекращаемый разговор (М., 2004) (In Russian)

== See also ==
- Chancery Slavonic
