= Andrey Vostrikov =

Andrei Vostrikov
- Андрей Иванович Востриков
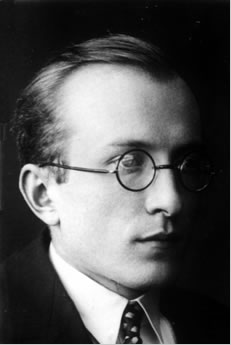
- Born: October 23, 1902; Saratov Governorate, Russian Empire
- Died: September 26, 1937 (aged 34); Moscow, Soviet Union
- Education: Petrograd University
- Employer: Institute of Oriental Studies of the Russian Academy of Sciences
- Known for: Tibetan Historical Literature

Andrey Ivanovich Vostrikov (Russian: Андрей Иванович Востриков; 23 October 1902 – 26 September 1937) was a Russian orientalist and scholar of Tibetology, Indology, and Mongolian studies. He is best known for his posthumously published work Tibetan Historical Literature (1962) and is considered "one of the most influential early historians of Tibet". He was executed at the age of 34.

Vostrikov was born in the Saratov Governorate into the family of a rural priest. He graduated from Petrograd University in 1924, where he studied under Fyodor Shcherbatskoy and Boris Vladimirtsov. His academic training under these scholars deeply influenced his later work in Buddhist philosophy and Tibetan studies.

Following his graduation, Vostrikov dedicated himself to research and teaching. He worked at the Asiatic Museum, the Institute of Buddhist Culture, and taught at several higher education institutions in Leningrad, including his alma mater.

From 1930, he served as a senior researcher at the Institute of Oriental Studies of the Academy of Sciences of the USSR. Between 1927 and 1932, he undertook annual field trips to the Aginsky Datsan in Buryatia, where he collaborated with learned lamas to study Tibetan translations of Indian philosophical treatises and their commentaries.

In early 1937, he was appointed head of the Tibetan section at the Institute of Oriental Studies. Vostrikov’s career was abruptly ended during the Great Purge. He was arrested in April 1937 and executed in Moscow in September of the same year. He was posthumously rehabilitated in 1956.

Vostrikov’s academic interests focused primarily on Buddhist philosophy, particularly the Nyāya system, the doctrines of Vijñānavāda, and the Kalachakra tantra. He prepared several studies on Buddhist logic, based on the works of Dharmakirti and Vasubandhu, as well as a comprehensive edition of the Kalachakra Tantra. Many of his manuscripts were never published during his lifetime and were subsequently lost following his arrest. Among these was his English-language monograph The Logic of Vasubandhu, which disappeared in India, where it had been sent for publication.

His best-known work, Tibetan Historical Literature, was published in 1962 and includes a valuable appendix containing a table for converting Tibetan calendar dates into the European chronology. An English translation appeared in Calcutta in 1970 and is still considered one of the best historical surveys of Tibetan literature.
