= Roald Mandelstam =

Russian poet and writer

- Born: September 16, 1932; Leningrad, Soviet Union
- Died: February 26, 1961; Leningrad, Soviet Union
- Occupations: Poet, Writer
- Spouse: Nina Vladimirovna Markevich
- Parent(s): Charles Yakovlevich Gorovich (father), Elena Iosifovna Mandelstam (mother)

Roald Charlesovich Mandelstam (Russian: Роа́льд Ча́рльсович Мандельшта́м; September 16, 1932 – February 26, 1961) was a Russian poet and writer. He was born in Leningrad and lived there during the Soviet era.

Mandelstam's patronymic name appears as "Charlesovich" in his birth and death records, but it is inscribed as "Charlzovich" on his gravestone.

== Biography ==
Born in Leningrad, September 16, 1932.

He studied at the Polytechnic Institute, then at the Faculty of Oriental Studies Saint Petersburg State University. He did not finish his education; because of the severe form of tuberculosis he could not work anywhere else and almost never left the house.

In 1954 he married Nina Markevich, a poet (1931–1992).

Repeatedly he tried to publish his poems, but had no publications in his lifetime. His poetry was first published in Russia after the collapse of the Soviet Union in 1991.

In the late 1950s his health rapidly deteriorated, he had to be treated in hospitals repeatedly.

On January 26, 1961, he died in the hospital from a hemorrhage and was buried in the Krasnenkoye Cemetery in Leningrad.

== Bibliography ==
- Ivanov, Boris, compiler. (2011). Peterburgskaia poėziia v litsakh : ocherki. Ivanov, B. (Boris), 1928-, Иванов, Б. (Борис), 1928-. Moskva: Новое литературное обозрение. ISBN 978-5-86793-798-0. OCLC 697266189.
