= Vidyadhara (Buddhism) =

Buddhist term meaning 'knowledge holder'

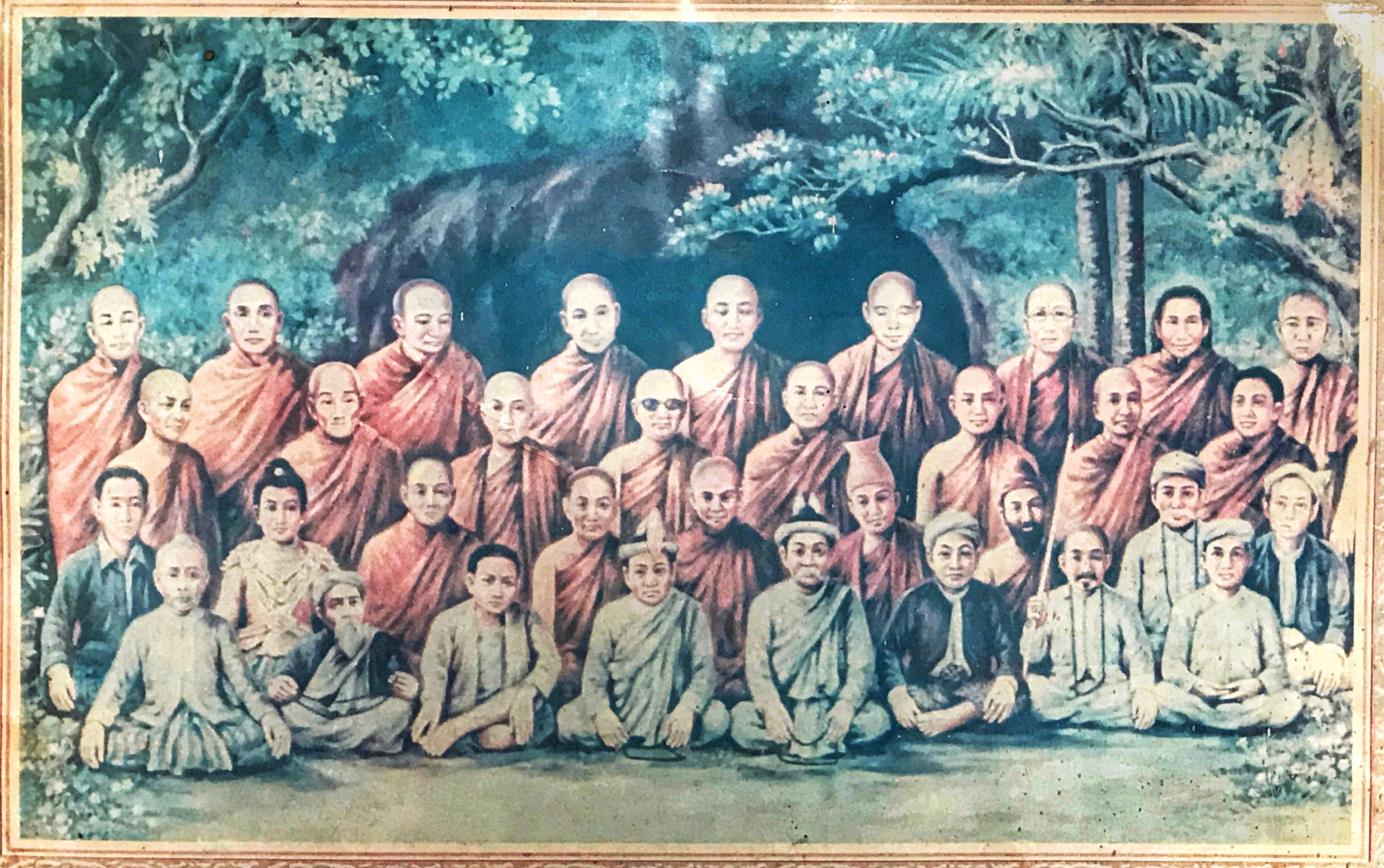
- Notable Burmese Vidyadharas
- Sanskrit: Vidyadhara
- Pāli: Vijjadhara
- Burmese: Weizza
- Chinese: Xian
- Japanese: Sennin
- Tibetan: Rigdzin

Vidyadhara (Sanskrit: Vidyadhara; meaning 'Knowledge-holder','Awareness-Holder') is the word in Buddhist literature for a person having the great knowledge (vidya) of mantras and samatha. A realized master on one of the four stages on the tantric path of Mahayoga.

Four levels of a vidyadhara which are specific to the Dzogchen or Nyingma tradition:

1. matured vidyadhara
2. vidyadhara with power over life
3. mahamudra vidyadhara
4. spontaneously accomplished vidyadhara

== Rigdzin Dupa ==
The Rigdzin Dupa, Vidyadharas Gathering, enshrines sacred treaties, revealing the profound views, powerful meditations, sacred conduct and ultimate Vajrayana teachings in Tibetan Buddhism. It is the inner Guru Rinpoche practice from the Longchen Nyingtik, the terma revelation of Jigme Lingpa.

== See also ==
- Mahasiddha
- Muni
- Rigdzin
- Rishi
- Weizza
- Xian
