= Boston University Center for Philosophy and History of Science =

Boston University Center for Philosophy and History of Science is an interdepartmental, interuniversity forum on the nature of science, and each year organizes the Boston Colloquium for Philosophy of Science.

== History ==
The Center for Philosophy and History of Science was founded in 1960 as an interdisciplinary, interuniversity collaboration, based at Boston University, with a small seed grant from the National Science Foundation. The Center was an offshoot of the Institute for the Unity of Science, which was itself the American transplant of the Vienna Circle. The Institute's central figure, Philipp Frank, had been one of the Vienna Circle's member and founder, and took part in the development of the Center's Colloquium series. The Center was founded by Robert S. Cohen, who was a professor of philosophy and physics at BU, and Marx W. Wartofsky, a professor of philosophy at BU. In 1993, Alfred I. Tauber, the Zoltan Kohn Professor of Medicine and Professor of Philosophy at Boston University, was appointed director, succeeding Professor Cohen. In 2010, Alisa Bokulich was appointed director.

There is only one older such center in North America, and that is the University of Minnesota’s Center for Philosophy of Science, which was founded in 1953 around Herbert Feigl. Both Herbert Feigl and Philipp Frank fled Europe for the U.S. when the Nazi’s came to power.

Beginning in 1963, the proceedings of many colloquia were published in the series Boston Studies in the Philosophy of Science (first by the D. Reidel Publishing Company, then by Kluwer Academic Publishers, Dordrecht, and now by Springer). Under the editorship of Robert Cohen, the "Boston Studies in the Philosophy of Science" produced more than 200 volumes in the areas of philosophy of the natural and social sciences, logic, mathematics, and the history and social relations of science.

Over the past 50 years, the Colloquium has hosted talks by the most prominent figures in the philosophy of science.

== Activities ==
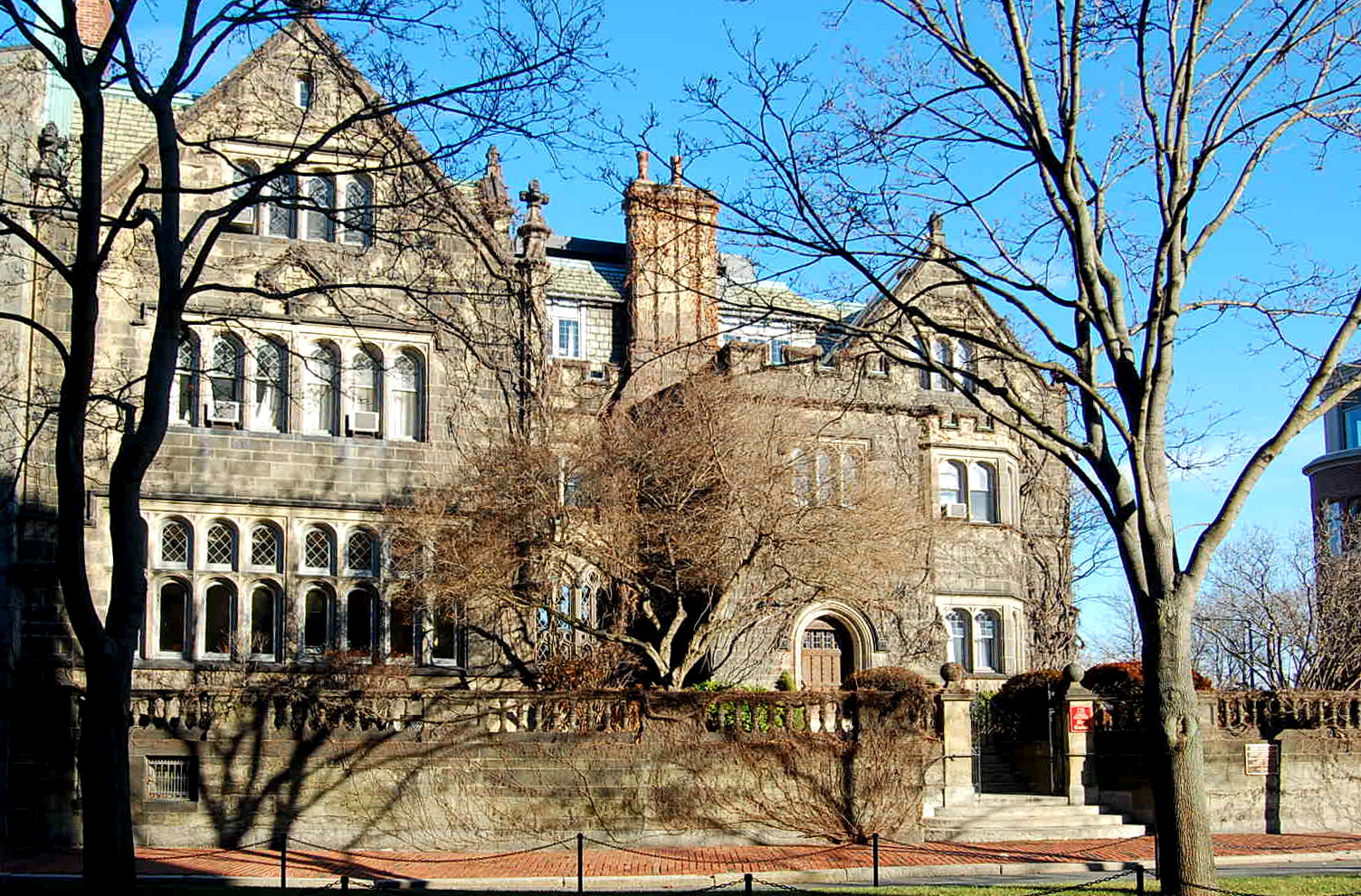
The BU Castle on Bay State Road, one of the locations for the Colloquium

Each year, the Center hosts the Boston Colloquium for Philosophy of Science, an eclectic program of symposia and lectures about all aspects of the philosophy and history of the sciences, mathematics, and logic.

=== Affiliated Center (Einstein Studies) ===
The CPHS is closely linked to the Center for Einstein Studies, also based at Boston University. The Center for Einstein Studies is directed by John Stachel. Boston University's Mugar Memorial Library holds a complete copy of physicist Albert Einstein's papers. Such copies, whose originals are in the Hebrew University of Jerusalem, can only be found at Boston University, Princeton University, and at the California Institute of Technology where the Einstein Papers Project is now located.
