= Shaluta =

Shaluta Шалута
- Settlement
- Location within Republic of Buryatia Location within Russia
- Coordinates: 51°36′N 107°21′E
- Country: Russia
- Region: Republic of Buryatia
- District: Ivolginsky District
- Time zone: UTC+8:00

Shaluta (Russian: Шалута; Buryat: Шулуута, Shuluuta) is a rural locality (a settlement) in Ivolginsky District, Republic of Buryatia, Russia. The population was 34 as of 2010. There is 1 street.

== Geography ==
Shaluta is located 20 km southeast of Ivolginsk (the district's administrative centre) by road. Kardon is the nearest rural locality.
