= David B. Zilberman =

Russian-American Philosopher (1938-1977)

David Beniaminovich Zilberman
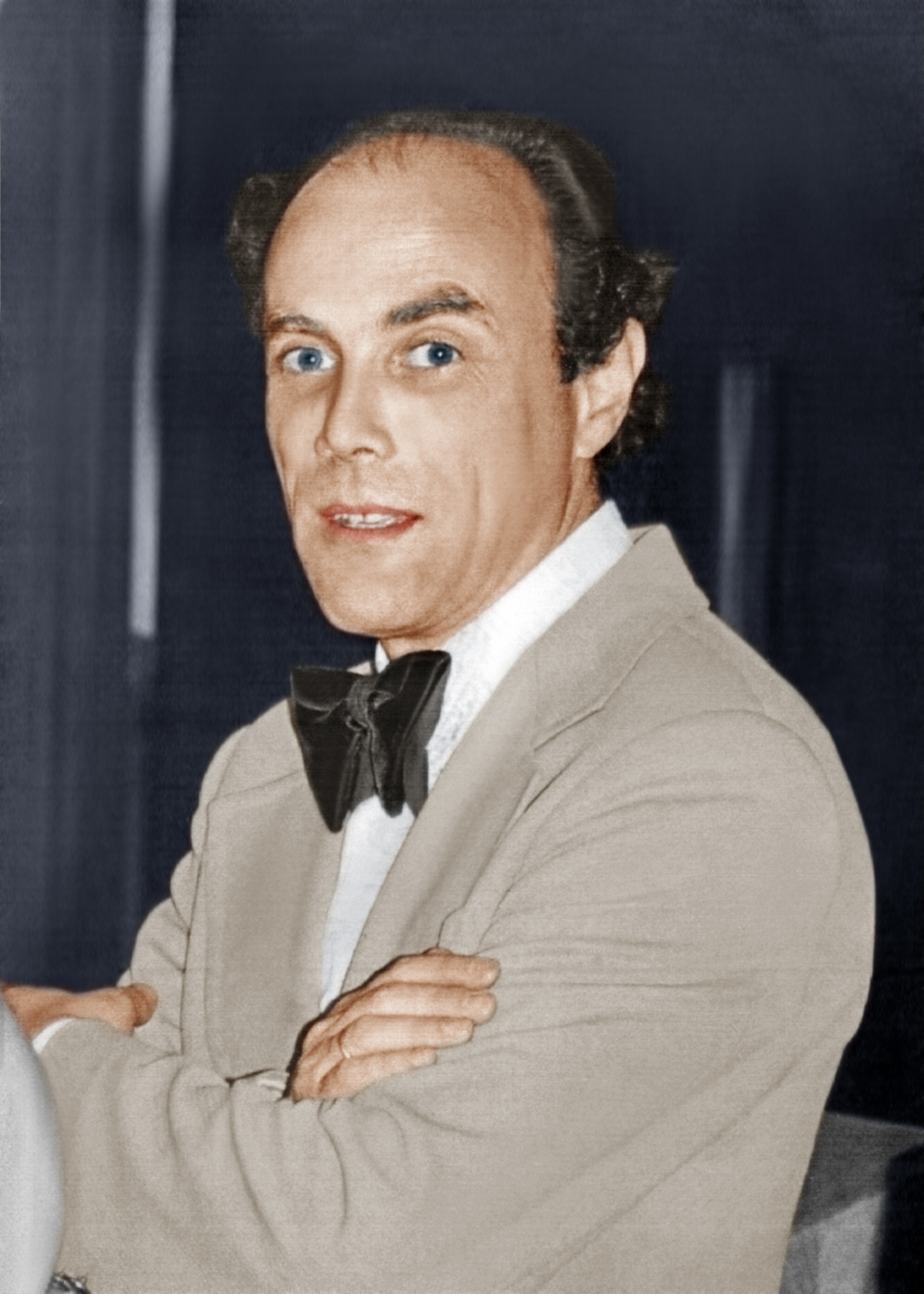
- Born: May 25, 1938; Odessa, Soviet Union
- Died: July 25, 1977 (aged 39); Boston, US

Philosophical work
- Era: 20th-century philosophy
- Region: Western philosophy · Vedanta · Vijnanavada · Hegel's phenomenology · Heidegger's hermeneutics · Bakhtin's semiotics · modern Anglo-American philosophy of language
- Notable ideas: Modal methodology · comparative sociology · cultural traditions · comparative philosophy · Indian philosophy

David Beniaminovich Zilberman (Russian: Дави́д Бениами́нович Зильберма́н; May 25, 1938, Odessa – July 25, 1977, Boston) was a Russian-American philosopher and sociologist, scholar of Indian philosophy and culture. He was well-versed in the study of languages and knew Russian, Sanskrit, English, Slavic languages, Ancient Greek, French, and German.

== Life and work ==
=== USSR ===
David Zilberman was born in Odessa, Ukraine on May 25, 1938, to Benjamin Zilberman, an engineer-economist, and Riva Timaner, a medical doctor. He graduated from high school in 1955. In 1962, Zilberman was awarded an engineering and meteorology degree from the Odessa State Environmental University. From 1962 until 1966, Zilberman was employed as a meteorologist at the local airport in Ashgabat, Turkmenistan, in Central Asia.

Zilberman began his Indological studies in 1962. He met and became friends with the academician Boris Smirnov, a medical doctor, a Sanskritist, and a leading theosopher in Russia. Zilberman studied Sanskrit under Smirnov while pursuing Indological investigations in logic, Indian yoga, and ritual. In Turkmenistan, he also studied a number of languages in addition to Sanskrit, including Ancient Greek, Latin, basic Romano-Germanic languages, and some Slavic languages, and he began writing philosophical essays.

In 1966 Zilberman returned to Odessa. He continued his philosophical studies on his own and participated in the Colloquium for Philosophy & History at Odessa State University (organized by Professor Avenir Ujemov Head of the Department of Philosophy). In 1968 he completed a two-year program at the State Institute of Intellectual Property. During that period, Zilberman worked at the Odessa State Environmental University performing research, and he worked for a time at a Construction & Development firm for the Black Sea Fleet as a Patent Lawyer.

In 1968 Zilberman was introduced to Professor Georgy Schedrovitsky who headed the Moscow School of Methodology. Schedrovitsky recommended Zilberman to one of Russia's leading sociologists, Professor Yuri Levada, for the post-graduate program at the Institute for Concrete Sociological Research (IKSI) in Moscow. Zilberman participated in the organized by Levada Methodological seminar which united supporters of many different scientific areas and was for a long time considered a semi-legal institution. Zilberman was also a participating member of the Moscow School of Methodology. Participants in the Moscow School seminars included: Alexander Zinoviev, Evald Ilyenkov, Georgy Schedrovitsky, Alexander Piatigorsky, Merab Mamardashvili, Vladimir Lefebvre, Boris Grushin, Oleg Genisaretsky and others. The School was believed by some to be the source of the most important developments in philosophy in the post-War period, rivaling anything done in the Western analytical tradition. The Moscow School of Methodology remains virtually unknown in the West.

During these years Zilberman translated numerous Hindu and Buddhist texts, poetic abstracts from "The Mahabharata", and part of the Tattva-Cintamani tetralogy from Sanskrit. He wrote articles on Indian philosophy and Buddhism, on sociology and anthropology, and on the sociological theory of tradition, a largely overlooked topic in modern social science.

Zilberman worked closely with Alexander Piatigorsky, writing a number of articles for The Great Soviet Encyclopedia. After leaving the USSR they remained close friends and continued their collaborative research and publication efforts until Zilberman's death in July 1977.

In 1972, while Zilberman was finalizing his research he discovered a new distinctive type of methodological-philosophical thinking "unlike the known types" and reflected this elaboration in his Тhesis, A Study of Cultural Traditions. This discovery became his central preoccupation and the focus of his efforts for the rest of his life. Zilberman called this pioneering method "Modal Methodology" or "Modal Metaphysics." At this early stage, Zilberman came up with his visionary idea that analogy is one of the fundamental techniques for interpreting tradition in the spirit of contemporary values and demands, and that the problem of analogy must be lively discussed in psychological and sociological contexts within the philosophy of science.

Completed in 1972, the Тhesis was accepted but remained unpublished due to the unexpected and sudden Soviet suppression of sociological and related research (an event described in Zilberman's "Post-Sociological Society"). The IKSI was closed and it essentially disappeared. Its members were forced to operate behind the Iron Curtain in a context of severely limited public visibility and without proper scientific recognition under conditions of heightened Soviet-style repression.

In 1972, due to an offer accepted by Zilberman to publish an article about Kabbalah abroad, he reportedly became a target of KGB surveillance. Leaving Moscow, Zilberman returned again to Odessa. To earn a living he undertook numerous translations for the Moscow Patriarchy, translating much of the Oxford Theological Dictionary from English to Russian, as well as the History of French Royal Court from French.

Zilberman translated into Russian the book by D. Ingalls "Materials For The Study Of Nyaya Nyāya Logic." [With the title in Russian: Vvedenie v Indijskuyu Logiku Navya-Nyāya (Introduction to Indian Logic Navya-Nyāya), ed. V. Smirnov. Moscow: Nauka.] and wrote an introductory section to the work dealing with some epistemological aspects of Indian formal logic. The book was published in 1974 in Moscow but without his name as the translator. A copious Introductory essay by Zilberman was withdrawn and replaced by a brief Editorial Introduction signed by the book editor.

=== United States ===
In 1973, David Zilberman and his family emigrated to the United States. In 1973 Zilberman received a position as a Visiting Assistant Professor in the Department of Anthropology at Hunter College in New York. In September 1974, Zilberman accepted a position as a Post-doctoral Fellow with the Committee on South Asian Studies at the University of Chicago.

For the last two years of his life, Zilberman taught at Brandeis University, Waltham, MA, first in the Department of Anthropology, and later in the Department of Philosophy and History of Ideas. Zilberman taught a variety of courses in Indian and Western philosophy and related disciplines. He applied the theory of Modal Methodology analyzing philosophical traditions of classical Indian and modern Western philosophy. David Zilberman planned to finish the book on Indian (as a comparison with Western) theories of analogy and to continue his fundamental research in India. Meanwhile, Zilberman started a book dedicated to thorough research and analysis of Russian Soviet Philosophy (the manuscript titled Moscow School of Methodology was left unfinished). David Zilberman died on July 25, 1977, in a car-bicycle collision while returning home from his last seminar with the students at Brandeis University.

His wife Elena Michnik-Zilberman lives in New York, the younger daughter Alexandra Zilberman lives in New York, and the older daughter Natalya Carney lives in Massachusetts. His sister Rachel Zilberman lives in Chicago.

== Legacy ==
David Zilberman created a distinctive type of methodological-philosophical thinking, which he called "Modal Methodology" or "Modal Metaphysics", and through this practice defined the "Sum of the Metaphysics". Zilberman attempted to develop the Philosophia Universalis from classical Hindu philosophies and apply it as a new synthesis to Western philosophy. Piatigorsky's book "Myshlenie i Nablyudenie" (Thinking and Observation), published in Riga in 2002, was dedicated to David Zilberman and included an explicit confession of Zilberman's influence on the author's thought. Some contemporary Russian philosophers consider themselves to be David Zilberman followers. Zilberman's archive is saved in the Special Collections of the Mugar Memorial Library. Boston University. Zilberman's archive is also preserved in the Special Collections at the Chicago University Library Research Center at Milton Singer Papers. In 1987–1988 at Boston Colloquium for the Philosophy of Science, there was held a Symposium In Memory of David Zilberman. In 1993–1994 at Boston Colloquium for the Philosophy of Science, Professor H. Gourko made a presentation of "Zilberman's Modal Methodology: a New Approach to Philosophy-Building".

== Works ==
- Semiotic Function of Kabbalah Mystical Experience in the Interpretation of Historical Situations --in: “David B. Zilberman: Selected Essays,” pp. 113-127, Springer, November, 2023.
- The Jewish Minority in the Soviet Ukraine. - in: Minutes of the Seminar in Ukrainian Studies, Harvard university. 1974, o. 6.
- Races and Peoples:Modern Ethnic and Racial Problems. Ethnography, Academy of Sciences, Moscow, 1972. p.351, English summary. Reviewed by David B.Zilberman, University of Chicago - in: American Anthropologist [the flagship journal of the American Anthropological Association], 1975, pp. 929–930.
- A Critical Review of E. Conze's translation of «The Large Sutra on Perfect Wisdom»--in: The Journal of Asian Studies, November, 1975.
- A Critical Review of D. Kalupahana's «Causality: The Central Philosophy of Buddhism»- - in: The Journal of Asian Studies, May, 1976.
- Iconic Calculus? – in: General Systems, vol. XXI, 1976, pp. 183–186.
- Ethnography in Soviet Russia. - in: Dialectical Anthropology, Vol. 1, No. 2, Feb. 1976, pp. 135–153
- Dissent in the Soviet Union. - In: Liberation, vol. 20, no.6, Fall 1977, pp. 3–8, edited by R.Cohen, Boston University.
- Approaching Discourses between Three Persons on Modal Methodology and Summa Metaphysicorum-- in: “David B. Zilberman: Selected Essays,” pp. 55-81, Springer, November, 2023.
- A Social Portrait of the soviet Intelligentsia. A review. - In: Theory and Society, 5 (1978), pp. 277–282.
- On Cultural Relativism and 'Radical Doubt'. - In: Science, Politics and Social Practice, BSPS, vol. 164, 1995, pp. 359–372 . Also in: “David B. Zilberman: Selected Essays,” pp. 83-94, Springer, 2023.
- The Emergence of Semiotics in India: Some Approaches to Understanding Laksana in Hindu and Buddhist Philosophical Usages. – in: Semiotica vol. 17, n. 3, 1976, pp. 255–265 (article written together with A.Piatigorsky). Also in: “David B. Zilberman: Selected Essays,” pp. 33-42, Springer, 2023.
- Orthodox Ethics and the Matter of Communism – in: “David B. Zilberman: Selected Essays,” pp. 207-268, Springer, November, 2023.
- Culture-Historical Reconstruction and Mythology in the Anthropology of Paul Radin - in: Dialectical Anthropology, Volume 6, June 1982, Issue 4, pp 275–290. Also in: “David B. Zilberman: Selected Essays,” pp. 95-112, Springer, 2023.
- Semantic Shifts in Epic Composition: On the «Modal» Poetics of the Mahabharata. — Semiosis, Michigan, 1984 and in:- “David B. Zilberman: Selected Essays,” pp. 3-31, Springer, 2023.
- Dialectical Psychology (Some Notes on Aristotle's De Anima) – in: “David B. Zilberman: Selected Essays,” pp. 181-204, Springer, 2023.
- Orthodox Ethics and the Matter of Communism. (In Russian) - I. Limbakh Pub.; Russia, Saint Petersburg, 2014.
- The Post-Sociological Society. – In: Studies in the Soviet Thought, vol. 18, 1978, pp. 261–328.
- DET POSTSOSIOLOGISKE SAMFUNN, av professor David B. Zilberman – translation into Norwegian of, in: online Journal Soviet Philosophy, Norway, June 2006.
- The Birth of Meaning in Hindu Thought — Dordrecht; Boston: D. Reidel Pub.; Norwell: Kluwer Academic, 1988.
- Understanding Cultural Traditions Through Types of Thinking. abstract from PhD Thesis – In: The Birth of Meaning in Hindu Thought, Chapter VIII.
- Genesis of Values in Hindu Philosophy (In Russian) transl. from English by Helena Gourko, ed. A. Ogurtsov, — Moscow: Editorial, 1998.
- Understanding Cultural Tradition (In Russian) — ed. O. Genisaretsky: Institute for Development in name of G.Schedrovitsky; Pub. ROSSPEN (series “Book of the world”), Russia, Moscow, 2015.
- Analogy in Indian and Western Philosophical Thought. — Ed. H.Gourko, R.Cohen, Dordrecht: Springer, 2006.
- Understanding Cultural Tradition. — Ed. Boris Oguibenine. Motilal Banarsidass Publishing House (mlbd.in), India, New Delhi, 2021.
- David B. Zilberman: Selected Essays. — Ed. Giridhari Lal Pandit, Springer, 1st ed. 2023 edition (11 Nov. 2023).
- Hegel and Mīmāṃsā: Thinking as Ritual (Outlines of the Imperative Grammar)--in: “David B. Zilberman: Selected Essays,” pp. 131-134, Springer, November, 2023.
- The Anticipation of Awakening--in: “David B. Zilberman: Selected Essays,” pp. 135-138, Springer, November, 2023.
- Reflections on Ontology in Six Darśanas--in: “David B. Zilberman: Selected Essays,” pp. 139-162, Springer, November, 2023.

== Selected bibliography ==
- Piatigorsky A. Preface — in: David B. Zilberman “The Birth of Meaning in Hindu Thought” / Robert S. Cohen Piatigorsky(ed.) D.Reidel Publishing Company, 1988, pp. xiii-xv.
- Ethel Dunn Reply to Zil'berman. — Dialectical Anthropology.
- John W. Cole Anthropology Comes Part-Way Home: Community Studies in Europe. — Annual Review of Anthropology. Vol. 6 (1977), pp. 349–378
- George Dalton Further Remarks on Exploitation: A Reply to Newcomer and to Derman and Levin. — American Anthropologist. New Series, Vol. 79, No. 1 (Mar., 1977), pp. 125–134
- Wong, Ka-Ying Timothy Western sociological theory and the Chinese cultural tradition: an assessment, University of Manitoba (Faculty of Graduate Studies (Electronic Theses and Dissertations)), 1988
- Pandit G.L. Rediscovering Indian philosophy: Review of “The Birth of Meaning in Hindu Thought”.— Delhi, University of Delhi, 1989.
- Callewaert W.M. Book Review: “The Birth of Meaning in Hindu Thought”.— Tijdschrift voor Filosofie, v51 n4 (19891201): p. 736 (1 page). Published By: Peeters Publishers, 1989. .
- Piatigorsky A. A Talk on Zilberman's Ideas on Philosophy as an Object of Science — in: Articles / Philosophy , March 22, 1988.
- Pandit G.L. “Rediscovering Indian Philosophy: Out of Text and Into Text”. — H.S. Prasad (ed.), Philosophy, Grammar and Indology, Essays in Honor of Professor Gustav Roth, Indian Books Centre, Delhi, University of Delhi, 1992, pp.41-51.
- Savely Senderovich "Romanticism as a Historico-Typological Category: Methodological Reflections" - in: Jr. Romantic Russia, vol. 1, pp. 17-44, by Charles Schlacks, University of South California, LA, ©1997.
- Oleg Genisaretsky. David Zilberman. On the Possibility of Philosophy. Correspondence: 1972-1977, Moscow, "Put," 2001 (in Russian).
- Nirmalangshu Mukherji. Academic Philosophy in India.— Economic and Political Weekly. Vol. 37, No. 10 (Mar. 9-15, 2002), pp. 931–936. Published By: Economic and Political Weekly
- Shaw J. L. Book Review: “The Birth of Meaning in Hindu Thought”.— International Studies in Philosophy vol.23 (1):143-144. Published By: Center for Interdisciplinary Studies in Philosophy, Interpretation, and Culture, at Binghamton University, archived by PhilPapers, 1991. .
- Gourko H. Introductory Essay. In Analogy in Indian and Western Philosophical Thought. — Dordrecht: Springer, 2006., pp.1-41.
- Hans van Ditmarsch • Rohit Parikh • R. Ramanujam: Logic in India—Editorial Introduction, Journal of Philosophical Logic., Bs. As. Argentina, Universidad de Salamanca Mar del Plata, September 2011.
- Dhruv Raina Decolonization and the Entangled Histories of Science and Philosophy in India.— Polish Sociological Review. No. 178 (2012), pp. 187–201. Published By: Polskie Towarzystwo Socjologiczne (Polish Sociological Association)
- Hans van Ditmarsch • Rohit Parikh • R. Ramanujam: Logic in India—Editorial Introduction, Journal of Philosophical Logic., University of Sevilla, Camilo José Cela s/n, 41018 Sevilla, Spain, 2015.
- Materialism of the Charvaka and rationalism of the Buddha, Posted by Sreenivasaraos on October 11, 2012, in Charvaka, Indian Philosophy.—
- Gourko H. “From Apocalyptic to Messianic: Philosophia Universalis” – PAIDEIA Contemporary Philosophy, BU, 2014.
- Bilimoria, P. Article “Thinking Negation in Early Hinduism and Classical Indian Philosophy”, Springer, 2017
- Dhruv Raina "Translating the “Exact” and “Positive” Sciences: Early Twentieth Century Reflections on the Past of the Sciences in India" , Jawaharlal Nehru University, New Delhi, 2015.
- Bhattacharya P. Article “The Lost Mahabharata of Jaimini”.— Abridged version of K.K.Handique Memorial Lecture delivered by the author at The Asiatic Society , Calcutta, August 2017.
- Joachim Zweynert Interests versus Culture in the Theory of Institutional Change? — Theory and Society
- Joachim Zweynert Contextualizing critical junctures: What Post-Soviet Russia Tells us about Ideas and Institutions. — Theory and Society
- Paris J.B. and Vencovská, A. “The Indian Schema as Analogical Reasoning”, Cited by 2 Related articles. Manchester Institute for Mathematical Sciences School of Mathematics, University of Manchester, 2016.
- Roy Tzohar “A Yogacara Buddhist Theory of Metaphor", Oxford University Press, Apr 9, 2018, 256 pages.
- Piatigorsky A. Preface — in: David B. Zilberman “Understanding Cultural Tradition” ed. - Boris Oguibenine. Motilal Banarsidass Publishing House (mlbd.in), India, New Delhi, 2021. pp. x-xi.
- Genisaretsky O. A few words about David Zilberman and his philosophizing — in: David B. Zilberman “Understanding Cultural Tradition” ed. - Boris Oguibenine. Motilal Banarsidass Publishing House (mlbd.in), India, New Delhi, 2021. pp. xviii-xxiv.
- Nemtsev M. Yu. – David B. Zilberman (1938-1977) in: Filosofia: An Encyclopedia of Russian Thought.
- Michnik-Zilberman E. Biographical notes on a remarkable life — in: David B. Zilberman “Understanding Cultural Tradition” ed. - Boris Oguibenine. Motilal Banarsidass Publishing House (mlbd.in), India, New Delhi, 2021. pp. xii-xvii.
- Zilberman R. On the Possibility of Love. The Joy and Bitterness of Life-long Span. The Story of Philosopher David Zilberman. , “Aletheia”, St. Petersburg, Russia, 2015. (in Russian).
- Gourko H. Modal Methodology of David Zilberman. Minsk: Econompress, Belarus, 2007. (in Russian).
- Fedoseev V. A. Resource of Methodology by David B. Zilberman for Philosophy of Education, ISBN 978-5-903931-72-9, St. Petersburg, Russia, 2010 (in Russian).
- Saman Pushpakumara "Edmund Husserl's Transcendence of Early Buddhist Theory of Consciousness" – The International Journal of Business and Social Research (IJBSR) Vol. 4 No. 3 (2014): March.
- Gourko H. "'Philosophology' of David Zilberman" in “David B. Zilberman: Selected Essays,” pp. ix-xxiii, Springer, November, 2023.
- Piatigorsky A. On the Philosophical Work of Zilberman in “David B. Zilberman: Selected Essays,” pp. 43-53, Springer, November, 2023.
- Pandit G.L. Methodological and Epistemological Priority of the Text with Structural Design: David B. Zilberman as Philosopher-Methodologist in “David B. Zilberman: Selected Essays,” pp. xxv-xxxiv, Springer, November, 2023.
