= Mugar Memorial Library =

Library for Boston University in the United States

Coordinates: 42.351°N 71.108°W

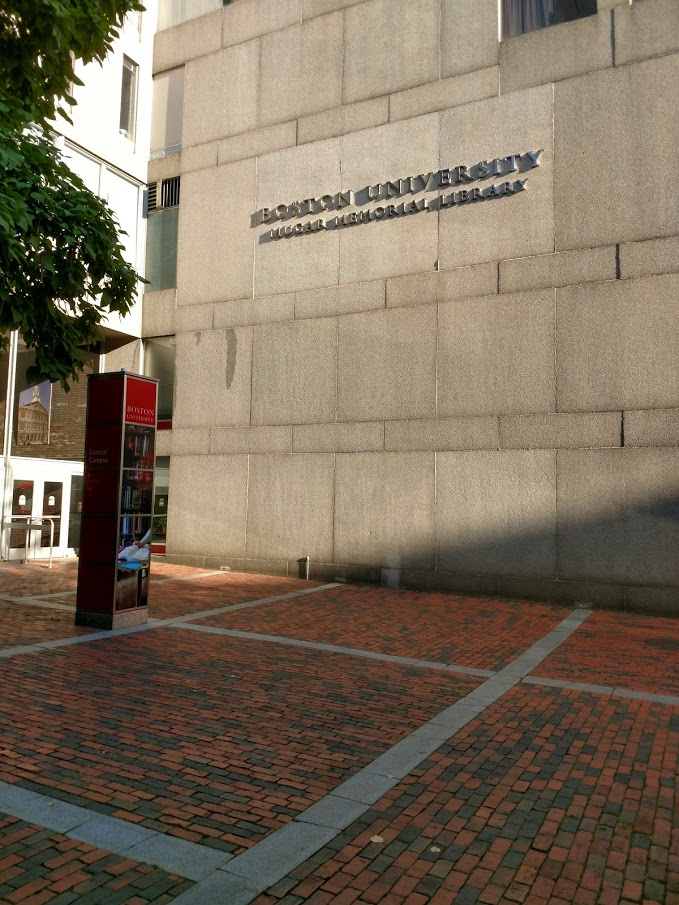
- Location: Boston, Massachusetts, US
- Type: Library
- Established: 1966

Other information
- Affiliation: Boston Library Consortium
- Website: www.bu.edu/library/

The Mugar Memorial Library is the primary library for study, teaching, and research in the humanities and social sciences for Boston University. It was opened in 1966. Stephen P. Mugar, an Armenian immigrant who was successful in the grocery business, provided the naming gift to commemorate his parents. Mugar's entrance carries an inscription from Stephen honoring his parents.

In coming to America from Armenia my parents opened the door of Freedom to me. America's public schools & libraries opened my eyes to the unlimited opportunity in this great land, as well as the privileges and obligations of citizenship. May this library serve over the years as a similar inspiration to all who use it. In memory of my father and mother Sarkis and Vosgitel Mugar. By their grateful son

– Stephen P. Mugar –

== Services ==
Mugar is home to many services for the Boston University community. In addition to library services such as circulation, reference, interlibrary loan, reserves and research data management, the library also has an Information Services and Technology Help Desk and provides printing, scanning, and copying services.

== Collections ==
Mugar provides access to a variety of academic databases, eJournals, eBooks, and print resources. These research materials are developed by librarians in collaboration with the faculty, staff, and students of Boston University.

== Branch libraries ==
=== African Studies Library ===
The African Studies Library (ASL) was founded in 1953 and is located on the sixth floor of the Mugar Memorial Library, accessible by the North elevator. Its primary function is to support Boston University's African Studies Center and all undergraduate, graduate, and faculty research on Africa. Students and faculty from area institutions and the general public are welcome to consult the collections. In addition to the circulating Africana collections, the ASL also houses several special collections. The staff provides a variety of services including reference assistance, library orientation and instruction, and individual consultations.

=== Astronomy Library ===
The Michael D. Papagiannis Astronomy Library (725 Commonwealth Avenue), collection includes books in all areas of the field, current journals, and a comprehensive collection of sky atlases and maps. The Astronomy Library supports BU's astronomy and astrophysics programs as well as research conducted by faculty and staff of the Astronomy Department, the Center for Space Physics, and the Institute for Astrophysical Research.

=== Frederick S. Pardee Management Library ===
The Frederick S. Pardee Management Library (595 Commonwealth Avenue, third floor), named for its benefactor, provides resources and services supporting the faculty and students in Boston University's Questrom School of Business. The Pardee Management Library is located on the second and third floors of the Rafik B. Hariri Building at 595 Commonwealth Avenue, and provides an extensive collection of print and electronic resources in business, management, and related subjects. In addition to its holdings, the Pardee Library offers reference services, library classes, and individual consultations.

=== Music Library ===
The Music Library on the second floor of Mugar Library includes books, scores, periodicals, recordings, and videos. The staff supports teaching, research, and exploration through the collection, and offers additional services including course building, reserves, and instructional sessions.

=== Pickering Educational Resources Library ===
The Pickering Educational Resources Library (2 Silber Way, basement level) supports Boston University's Wheelock College of Education & Human Development faculty and students through research services, instruction, and collection development. The great majority of education collections are available electronically. Pickering holds books on educational practice, books for children and young adults, and pre-K–12 educational kits.

=== Science and Engineering Library ===
The Science and Engineering Library (38 Cummington Mall) is the primary library resource for study, teaching, and research in the sciences and engineering on Boston University's Charles River Campus. The Science and Engineering Library supports the Astronomy, Biology, Chemistry, Computer Science, Earth & Environment, Mathematics & Statistics, and Physics departments, the College of Engineering, and associated research labs and centers. In addition to extensive holdings, the library provides reference assistance, group instruction, and access—by-request to early volumes of leading journals.

=== Stone Science Library ===
The Stone Science Library (675 Commonwealth Avenue) brings together books, journals, atlases, maps, photographs, and more in support of the Archaeology, Earth & Environment, and Earth Science and Geology departments, as well as the Center for Archaeological Studies, and the Center for Remote Sensing.

The Stone Science Library's non-circulating holdings include some 9,700 books and journals, 5,000 maps, and the Will Myers Aerial Photograph Archive, among many other resources. The main focus of the collections is on archaeological and remote sensing materials.

== Additional Boston University libraries and archives ==
=== Howard Gotlieb Archival Research Center ===
The center was known as the Special Collections when created in 1963. It was renamed to Howard Gotlieb Archival Research Center in 2003 to honor its founder, Howard Bernard Gotlieb.

The University's rare book and manuscript collections are held in the Howard Gotlieb Archival Research Center, formerly called the Twentieth Century Archives. The Research Center is housed on the fifth floor of the Mugar Library (accessible by the South elevator) and is open to the public for research and viewing. The Center's reception area also includes a large display area where examples of its holdings are on display. There is also a reading room for studying its materials. Research scholars must make appointments at least two days in advance to use papers from the collections.

The Archives also maintain a large public display area on the first floor of the Mugar library, displaying highlighted samples from the collections of dozens of notable persons from the 20th century and beyond. Smaller display cases scattered throughout the Mugar Library exhibit selections from the Archives.

The Contemporary Collection was established starting in 1963, and includes personal papers and artifacts owned by well-known authors, musicians, actors, and other artists, as well as politicians, scientists, and other celebrities primarily but not limited to the 20th century. The Contemporary Collection constitutes the majority of the Archives's holdings, and include former BU professor and prolific author Isaac Asimov's papers, which fill 464 boxes on 232 feet (71 m) of shelf space, as well as the archives of Bette Davis, Gene Kelly, Adele Astaire, Martin Luther King Jr., David B. Zilberman and many other notable individuals from the twentieth century. Also included are original manuscripts and papers of American spy novelist Dan Sherman and the same again for many another of the mystery/espionage genre.

In addition, the Historical Collection includes papers and artifacts from before the 20th century. The History of Nursing Collection, the official BU Archives, and a Rare Book Collection comprise the remainder of the Archive holdings.

Because the Einstein Papers Project was formerly located at Boston University Center for Einstein Studies, the Library holds a complete copy of Albert Einstein's papers. The originals are at the Hebrew University of Jerusalem; complete copies can only be found at Boston University, Princeton University, and at the California Institute of Technology, where the Einstein Papers Project is now located.

=== Samuel M. Fineman Law Library and Pappas Law Library ===
The Samuel M. Fineman Law Library and the Pappas Law Library (765 Commonwealth Avenue) provide scholarly resources, collections, and services to support the research needs of the students and faculty at Boston University School of Law as well as other legal researchers at Boston University. The law library contains federal and state primary legal materials; major serials, treatises, and other secondary materials; legal documents and reports; and international law materials.

=== Medical Library ===
The Alumni Medical Library serves as the library and knowledge-based literature and information provider to the faculty, staff, and students of Boston University Schools of Medicine, Dental Medicine, Public Health, and the Boston Medical Center. The library is located at 80 East Concord Street, in the BU Medical Campus in the South End district of Boston.

=== School of Theology Library ===
The collections of the School of Theology (745 Commonwealth Avenue) are developed in concert with those of Mugar Memorial Library. The School of Theology library concentrates on theology, Bible, church history, ministry, and historic Judaism, while Mugar collects in comparative religion and the academic disciplines of religion, philosophy, sociology, including contemporary Jewish life and culture.

== Architecture ==
Mugar Library was designed by the Cambridge firm of Sert, Jackson & Gourley led by Josep Lluís Sert. It was part of a master plan for the Charles River Campus that also included the George Sherman Union and the Law Tower.

== Mugar Library layout ==
In front of Mugar Memorial Library and adjacent to the nearby George Sherman Union, the courtyard provides a space for students to congregate and study. Many benches flank the Courtyard and the area is the scene of assiduous gardening, with a great deal of cultivation taking place throughout the spring and summer. The courtyard is most often used in the spring and summer. The area offers a full view of Commonwealth Avenue as well as an adjacent courtyard where bicycle storage is available.

The basement contains the Krasker Film and Video services, current periodicals, microfilm and microfiche readers and printers, and a study area.

The ground floor contains the Research Center, IT Help Center, Print Center, Circulation, Reserves, and the Information Commons. Computer access is restricted to members of the Boston University community; however, guests can be provided access by the staff. The ground floor also houses rotating exhibits from the Howard Gotlieb Archival Research Center, including an exhibit of Napoleon Bonaparte's death mask. The security booth is also located on the 1st floor near the building exit.

The second floor houses the Music Library, with a diverse collection of works ranging from classical, jazz, and rock, to contemporary artists. Musical scores are included in the collection as are records, CDs, cassettes and 8-track tapes. The Arthur Fiedler Reading Room, and the Listening Room are located on this floor.

The third floor contains the PAL Study Lounge as well as offices for many administrative functions of the Library. Technical services are on this floor, as are many of the librarian offices. The Martin Luther King Jr. reading room, offering some of the work of Boston University's most famous alumnus, is also located on the third floor.

The fourth floor contains study carrels for users with disabilities. Classics, history, linguistics, politics, geography, sports, philosophy, religion, education, law, and photography are all on the fourth floor. The fourth floor also contains the library staff lounge.

The fifth floor contains study carrels and contains collections related to language and literature. The Howard Gotlieb Archival Research Center is also located on this level, but is not directly accessible from the main library stacks.

The sixth floor houses the African Studies Library.

== External links and references ==
- About the Mugar Memorial Library
