= George Sherman Union =

Student union building at Boston University

Coordinates: 42.351°N 71.109°W

Boston University George Sherman Union
- Sherman Union
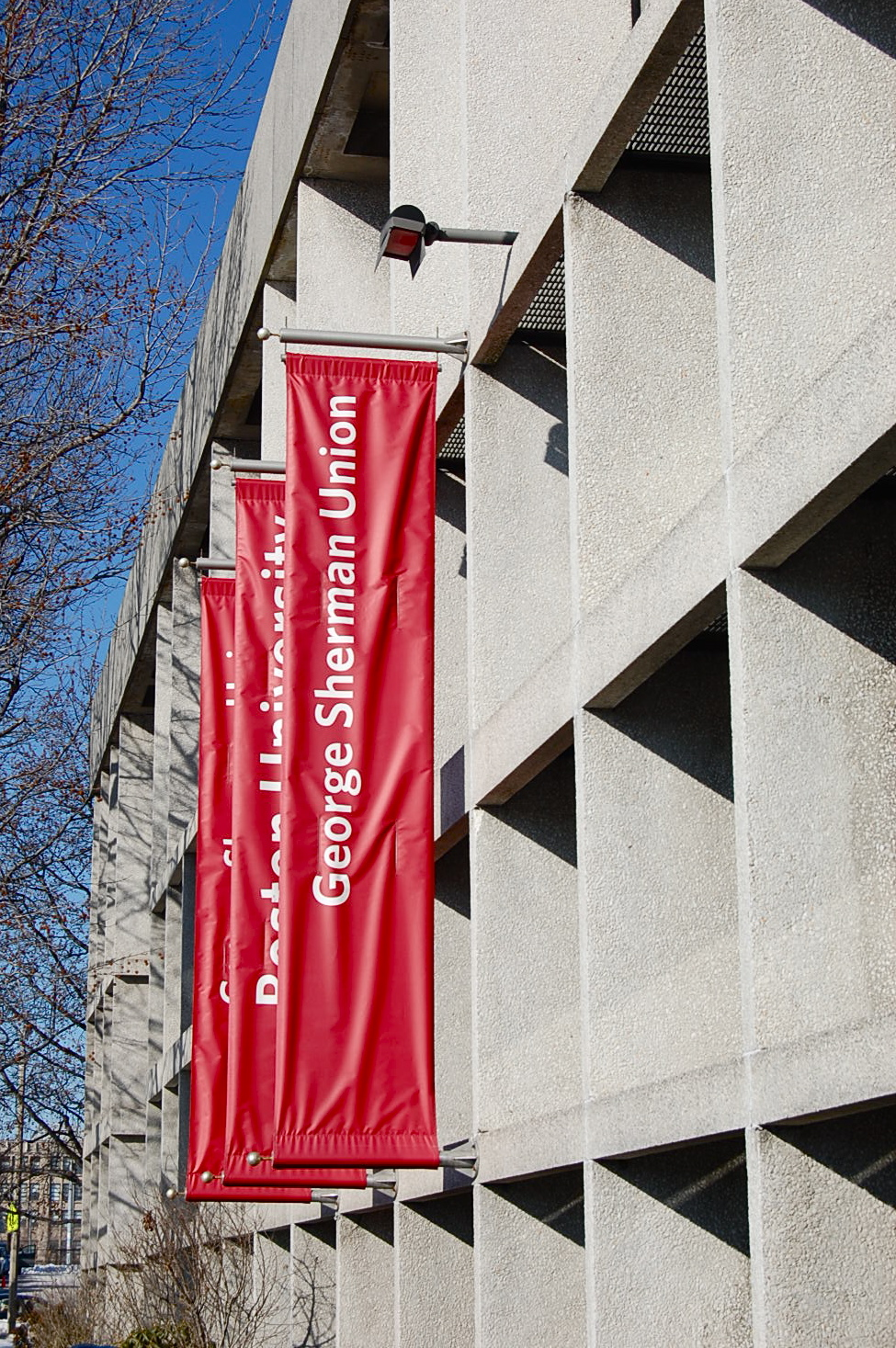
- Concrete facade of the George Sherman Union
- Interactive map of the Boston University; George Sherman Union area

General information
- Type: Student union
- Architectural style: Brutalist
- Construction started: 1963
- Renovated: 2020

Design and construction
- Architect: Josep Lluís Sert

Website
- http://www.bu.edu/gsu

The George Sherman Union (GSU) is the student union building at Boston University and Boston University Academy. The Brutalist-styled building opened in Spring 1963. When it opened, the Union had a 10-lane bowling alley in its basement. The building is named for the Boston industrialist, philanthropist, and Boston University benefactor. The Union was modeled after similar student centers in Midwestern universities.

Inside are many of Boston University's administrative offices, a nine-restaurant food court, two bank branches, several auditoriums and other open space, as well as the BU Scarlet Safewalk service. The GSU abuts Mugar Memorial Library, the school's main library.

Students come to the GSU to organize events, gather and exchange information, and meet people. It provides an atmosphere for study and conversation. As the community center of Boston University, it provides cultural, social, and recreational programs that supplement regular classroom education. The facilities of the George Sherman Union are reserved for the exclusive use of students, faculty, staff, and alumni of Boston University.

The GSU was one of many buildings benefitting from renovations during the summer of 2010. The Union Hall food court and study lounges were later renovated again, completing in August 2020. The East Campus Boiler Plant, which heats and cools the GSU was converted from oil to natural gas, reducing the University's carbon footprint by 3%. More wireless access points were added, as well as compost and recycling receptacles to encourage the university's dedication to become more green.
