= Institute for Mongolian, Buddhist and Tibetan Studies =

Research institute in Ulan-Ude, Russia

Institute for Mongolian, Buddhist and Tibetan Studies of the Siberian Branch of the Russian Academy of Sciences
- Институт монголоведения, буддологии и тибетологии СО РАН
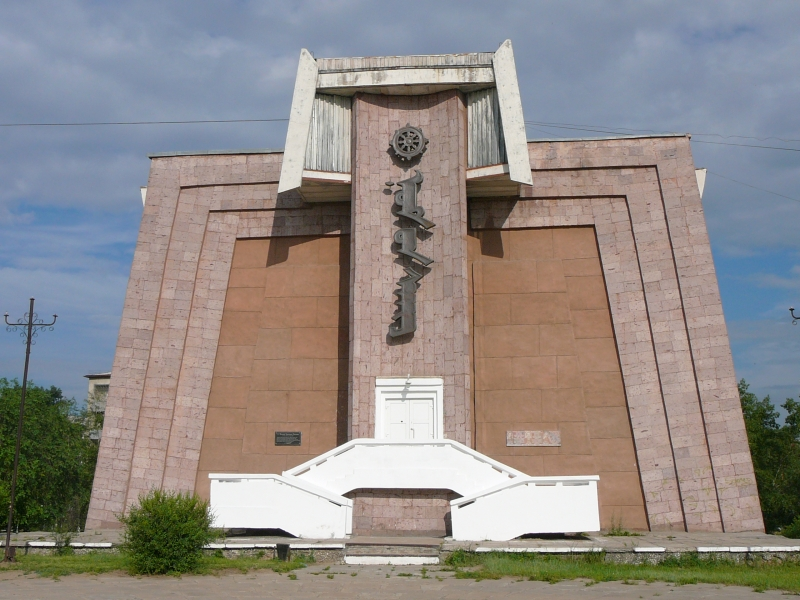
- Abbreviation: IMBT SB RAS
- Formation: 1922; 104 years ago
- Type: Research institute
- Headquarters: Ulan-Ude, Russia
- Staff: 88
- Website: imbt.ru

Institute for Mongolian, Buddhist and Tibetan Studies of the Siberian Branch of the Russian Academy of Sciences (Russian: Институт монголоведения, буддологии и тибетологии СО РАН, romanized: Institut mongolovedeniya, buddologii i tibetologii SO PAN) is a public research institution in Ulan-Ude, Russia, and a constituent institution for oriental studies under the Buryat Science Centre of the Russian Academy of Sciences. It was founded on July 1, 1922 as the Buryat Scholarly Committee under the leadership of Bazar Baradin, with the objective of studying history, language, and culture of Buryatia. In 1949, it entered the Siberian Branch of the Academy of Sciences of the USSR under the name of Buryat-Mongolian Scientific and Research Institute of Culture.

The Institute consists of six scientific departments: Department for Philosophy, Cultural and Religious Studies, Department of Linguistics; Department of Literature and Folklore Studies, Department of History, Ethnology and Sociology, Department for History and Culture of Central Asia, and the Centre for Oriental Manuscripts and Xylographs.

The Institute's Centre for Oriental Manuscripts and Xylographica houses a unique collection of over 40,000 17—early 20 century Buddhist manuscripts and printing blocks in Mongolian and Tibetan languages, as well as Russian Old Believers books and manuscripts. Most of the collection consists of books and manuscripts confiscated from Buddhist datsans and private libraries during the Soviet anti-religious campaign.

The institute has 88 research staff, including one academician of the RAS, one corresponding member of the RAS, 28 D.Sc. and 60 PhD.

In 1941, Nicholas Poppe was a member of the institute's scientific council.
