= 2024 Boston University strikes =

Labor strike in Massachusetts, United States

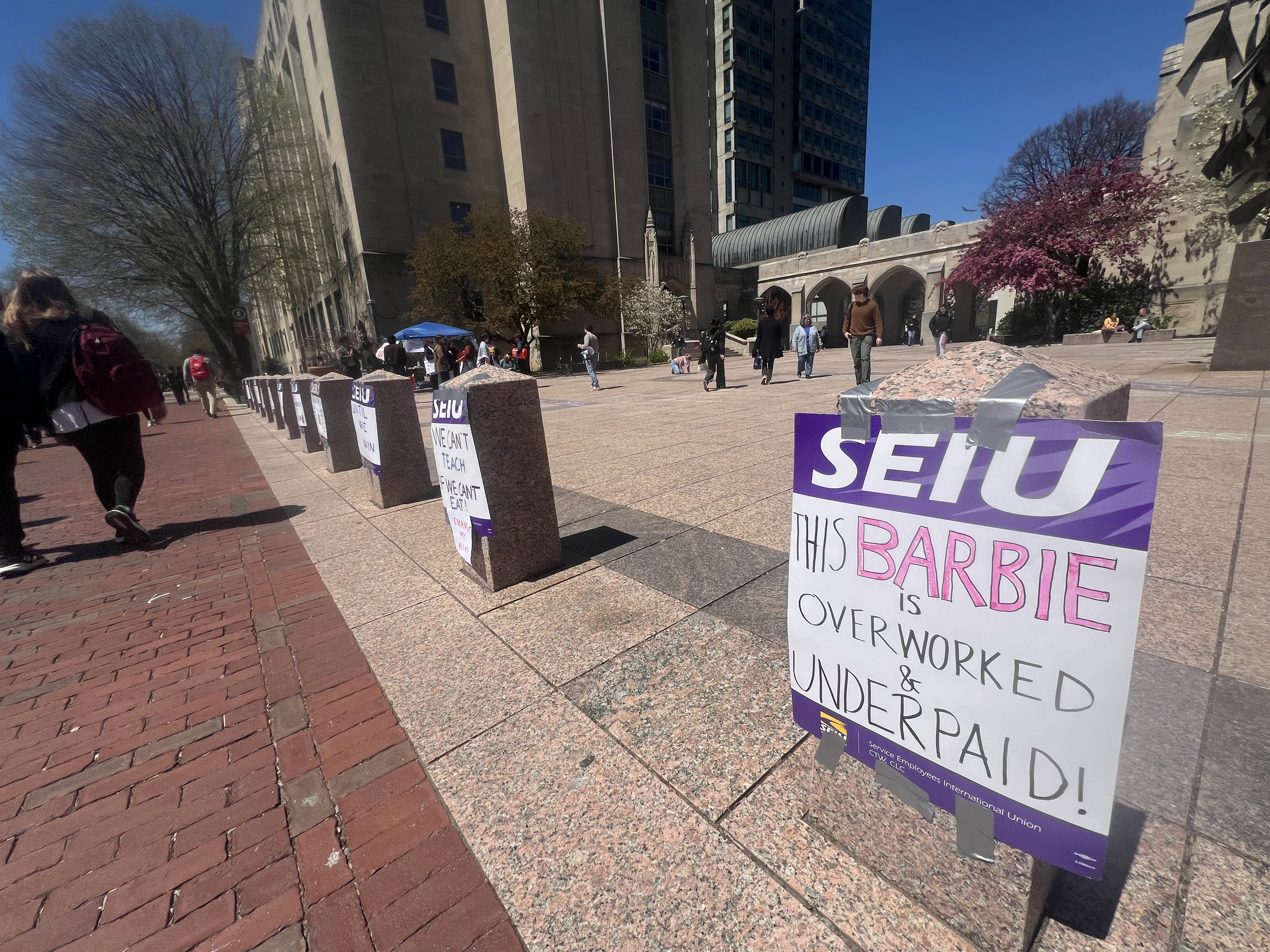
- Signs at Marsh Plaza referencing the 2023 Barbie movie
- Date: BUGWU: March 25 – October 17, 2024 (6 months, 3 weeks and 1 day. 206 days); BU ResLife Union: April 12 – 15, 2024 (4 days); August 31 – September 6, 2024 (6 days)
- Location: Boston, Massachusetts, United States
- Goals: BUGWU: Increased wages; Healthcare and childcare benefits; Disability and public health protections; Parent and caregiver protections; BU ResLife: Increased wages; Enhanced CPR and Narcan training; Summer health and safety measures; Improved health and COVID protections
- Methods: Strike action; Work stoppage; Picketing
- Status: BUGWU: Contract ratified between BUGWU and BU covering some demands; BU ResLife: Contract ratified between BU ResLife Union and BU covering most demands

Parties
Boston University Graduate Workers Union: 3,500+ members, striking worker number unknown; Boston University Residence Life Union: 300 members, 50-75 on strike; Service Employees International Union Local 509	Boston University

The 2024 Boston University strikes were labor strikes in Boston, Massachusetts by graduate students and residential life workers at Boston University. The first strike began on March 25, 2024, ending October 17, 2024, and was organized by the Boston University Graduate Workers Union (BUGWU) labor union, which is affiliated with the Service Employees International Union Local 509. It was the longest strike the university has experienced since a 1979 strike which lasted two weeks and four days. A concurrent strike by the Boston University Residence Life Union (BU ResLife Union) labor union, also affiliated with SEIU 509, ran for four days starting on April 12, 2024. The ResLife Union would begin another strike on August 31, 2024, starting a second concurrent strike with BUGWU, and concluding on September 6. On August 20, 2024, the BUGWU strike would become the longest higher education student worker strike in the past decade, surpassing the previous 147-day record set by University of Michigan graduate students in 2023, and reported by BUGWU to be the longest graduate strike in American history.

== Background ==
In 1979, Boston University experienced a strike as a result of backlash over policies by the university's president John Silber. The union behind this strike, the Boston University - American Association of University Professors, found itself decertified following a ruling NLRB v. Yeshiva University stating that university professors were not protected under the National Labor Relations Act of 1935. The university did not see another major strike until 45 years later following a 2016 National Labor Relations Board decision that allowed students to unionize.

== Boston University Graduate Workers Union ==
=== History ===
The university's graduate workers began organizing efforts in late 2020 as a result of the COVID-19 pandemic, in an effort to implement a safer workplace. Graduate workers then voted to affiliate with Service Employees International Union (SEIU) Local 509 in mid-2021, which also represents adjunct professors, lecturers, and residential advisors. In September 2022, graduate workers began a successful public campaign of union authorization forms, advocating for improvements in wages, workload protections, healthcare and coverage, support for international students, and housing. In December 2022, BU's graduate workers voted 1,414 to 28 in favor of unionization, officially forming the Boston University Graduate Workers Union (BUGWU).

==== Contract negotiations ====
BUGWU sought negotiations with Boston University's negotiation team starting in July 2023, holding at least one session a month. The first meeting saw two articles proposed, with the total number since expanding to 40, of which three have been rejected and seven have been tentatively agreed upon as of April 2024. In September 2024, there were 15 tentative agreements, 4 rejected articles, and 18 pending articles, with BUGWU alleging that 15 articles are being refused to be countered by BU.

=== BUGWU strike ===
Disagreements in pay, healthcare, and benefits prompted BUGWU to move towards voting to authorize a strike. The union moved towards a strike by citing the MIT living wage calculator's estimation of $62,000 a year to live in Boston as being significantly above their pay of $27,000-$40,000 a year. BUGWU also cited greater access to healthcare for workers and their dependents. They highlighted freedom from rent burden, 12-month stipends, disability and public health protections, and parent and caregiver protections. BUGWU held a strike authorization vote from February 28 to March 11, 2024, with 90% voting in favor. They also filed an Unfair Labor Practice with the NLRB against the university, totaling six as of April 2024.

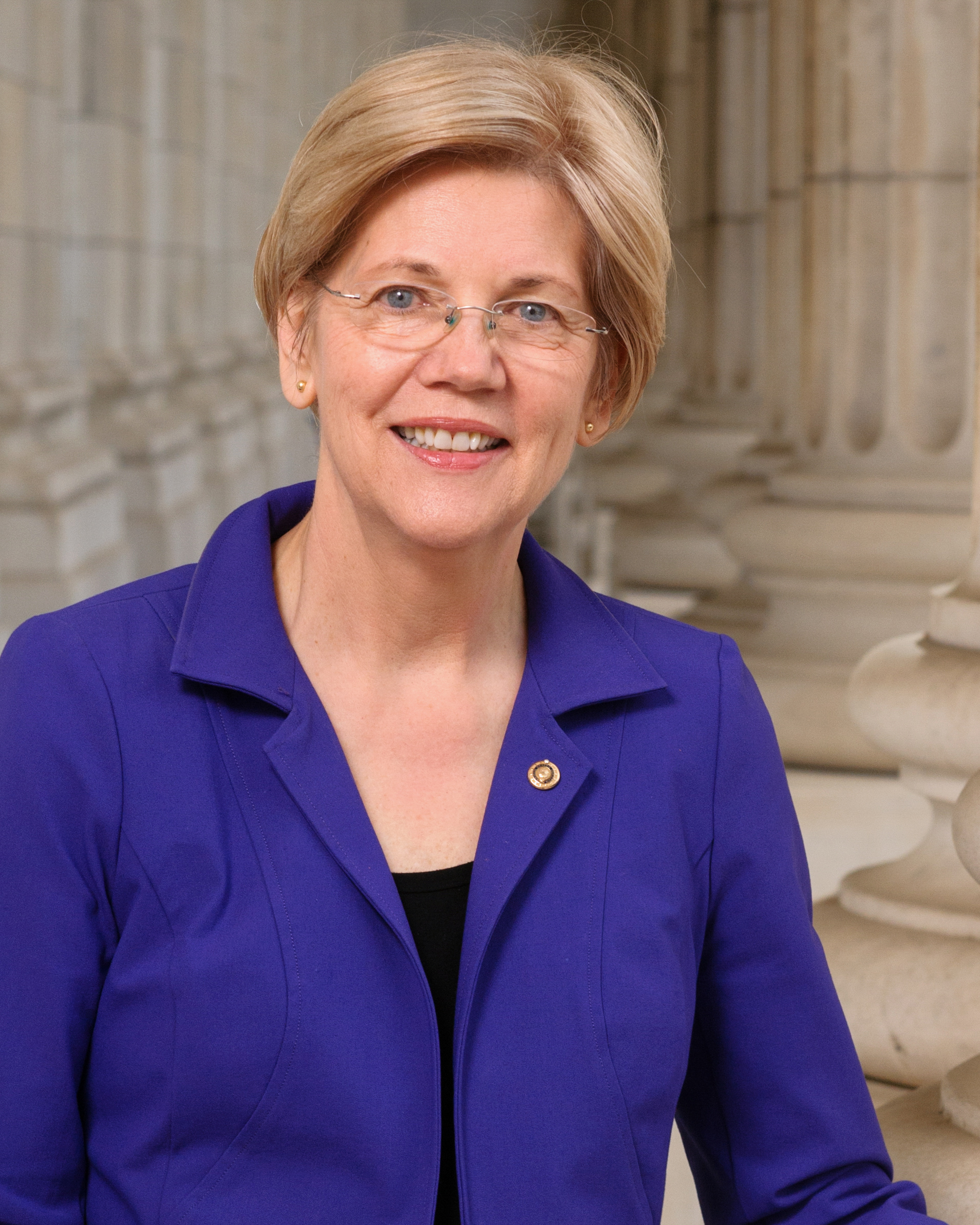
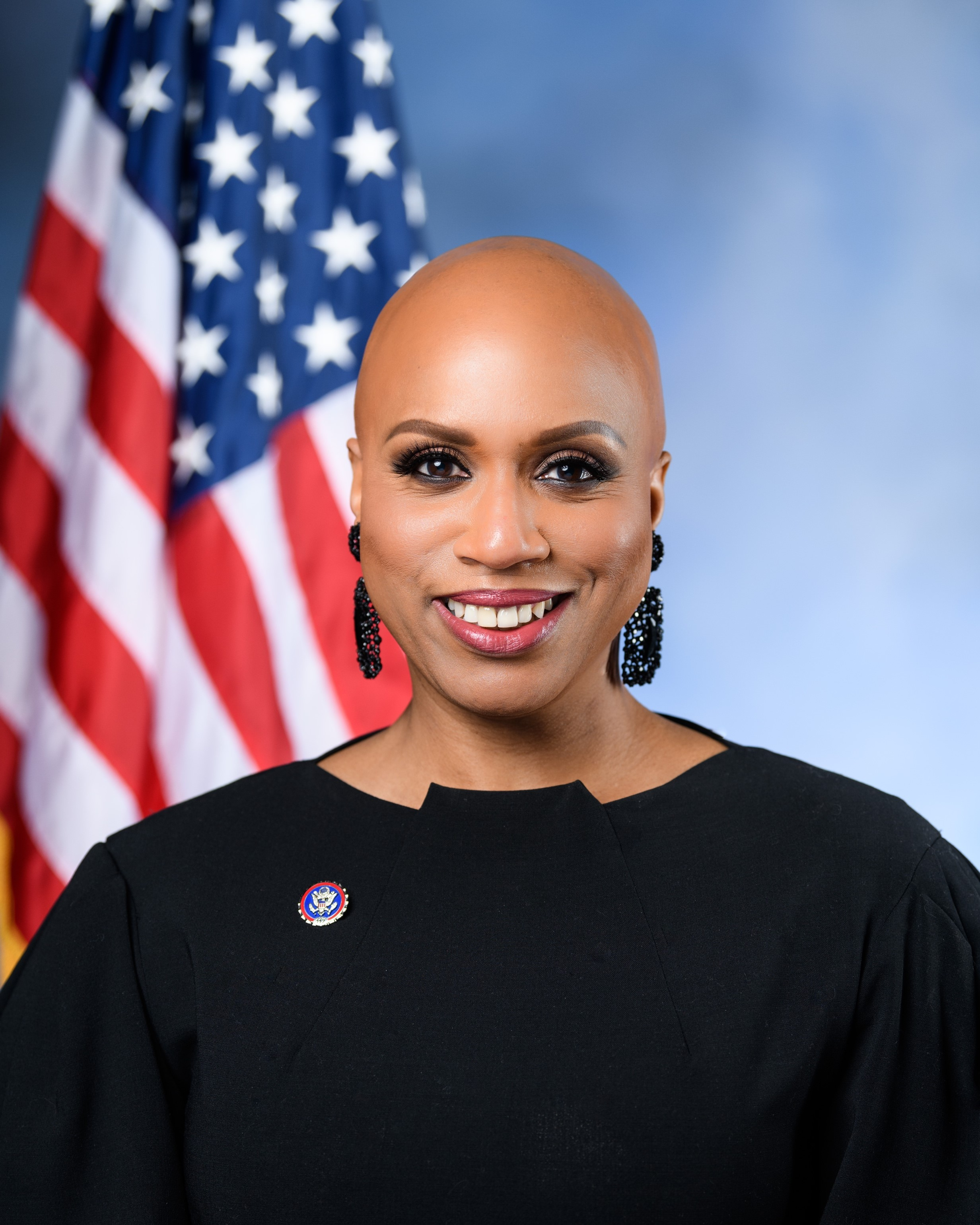
U.S. Senator Elizabeth Warren and Representative Ayanna Pressley attended picket lines in support of the strikers.

==== Strike Begins ====
On March 25 at noon, BUGWU began their strike with a rally at Marsh Plaza, the center of the school's campus. This included speeches by graduate workers, Representative Ayanna Pressley, whose district includes the university, and Senator Elizabeth Warren, who represents Massachusetts. BUGWU stated that they would continue to picket on weekdays at both the Charles River and Medical campuses until their demands were met.

==== Subsequent Protests ====
BUGWU has held subsequent protests following their initial rally, such as picketing at BU's commencement, a walkout on the first day of classes, and other smaller events.

On September 27, BUGWU would protest the inauguration of the university's new president, Melissa L. Gilliam, claiming that she has not divested investments nor met with BU unions.

==== Support ====
Various people and groups have shared their support for BUGWU, including Senator Bernie Sanders of Vermont, SAG-AFTRA, Boston City Council, State Representative Mike Connolly, the university's student government, and other graduate and teacher unions. Boston University's student government would also pass a resolution in support of the ResLife strike.

==== University Reaction ====
Boston University's Office of the Provost updated their payroll policy as a result of the strike, requiring all graduate workers to attest to working weekly in order to receive their stipends. In response, graduate workers union filed an Unfair Labor Practice with the NLRB against the university, alleging wage theft. BUGWU urged their workers not to fill out anything without speaking to union representatives first.

Graduate workers claimed instances of intimidation, surveillance, and harassment. Students putting up union fliers claimed they have been questioned by administrative workers, while departments like the Center for Computing & Data Sciences have enforced flier restrictions in their building according to claims by BUGWU. Graduate workers alleged that their private offices were raided for pro-union materials. Others reported that personal items had been taken as well, although the union states that the Dean of Arts and Sciences told department heads the raids would cease.

Boston University would file an unfair labor practice against the union for picketing actions on May 10, 2024.

===== Use of Artificial Intelligence =====
On March 28, 2024, the dean of the Boston University College of Arts and Sciences sent an email to staff and faculty suggesting the use of generative artificial intelligence to give students feedback on assignments in the absence of graduate workers. Multiple news organizations reported on the dean's suggestion, sparking backlash from both students and professors.

==== Strike Ends ====
A contract would be agreed by both sides on October 16, 2024 with 87% of union voters in favor, ending the strike. Out of 41 articles proposed, 38 were accepted.

=== Suspension of Humanities and Social Science Ph.D. Programs ===
Boston University sent an email to Ph.D. applicants in mid-November, 2024, announcing that they would not be accepting applications for the upcoming academic year in American and New England Studies, Anthropology, Classical Studies, English, History, History of Art and Architecture, Linguistics, Philosophy, Political Science, Religion, Romance Studies, and Sociology graduate programs. The university has not given a statement about the suspension.

An email would be obtained by Inside Higher Ed written by Stan Sclaroff and Malika Jeffries-EL, two deans of the university's College of Arts and Sciences, where the BUGWU's contract was cited as imposing a strained budget, and that the College of Arts of Sciences within Boston University will need to become more economically independent to accommodate doctoral programs. The dean would cite a 2022 Ph.D. Task Force on Ph.D. Education report for their decision, which included challenges such as an increased cost of living, low rate of tenure-track faculty from graduate programs, and increasing graduate worker unionization.

==== Reactions ====
Multiple media outlets would report on the suspension and the email sent by the CAS deans, including WBUR, The Boston Globe, GBH, ARTnews, and Boston.com.

A communications director for SEIU 509, which BUGWU is affiliated with, would offer a statement to ARTnews saying that they reject the idea that the BUGWU contract has caused labor costs to increase to a point that necessitated these programs being suspended and commenting on the university's long-term goals.

== Boston University Residence Life Union ==
Resident assistants (RAs) began organizing in early 2023 after calls for the formation of a labor union in 2021. After holding a rally in support of the BU ResLife Union in February 2023, it was announced that a majority of the 280 RAs had signed union authorization forms; a month later, 92% of the RAs voted to form a union and join SEIU Local 509. Their formation would be supported by a resolution adopted by the City Council of Boston.

This union, composed of both undergraduate and graduate students, advocated for a $15 an hour wage, meal plans for non-dormitory workers instead of a $15 per week stipend, improved CPR and Narcan training, crisis intervention, mental health care, summer safety measures, and backpay. They have also criticized BU's RA grade point average policy, which maintains that RAs must keep a GPA of 2.7 and above, as being used by the university to unfairly fire union members and remove housing. Claiming that the university did not begin enforcing the policy until after members began unionizing, the BU ResLife Union would file an unfair labor practice. They have filed several others with the NLRB.

=== Contract negotiations ===
The BU ResLife Union began contact negotiations with Boston University in December 2023, proposing 28 articles, with five having been tentatively agreed upon as of April 2024. The BU ResLife Union threatened to strike if their demands were not met by the university, holding a strike authorization vote between April 2 and April 11, and striking from April 12 to 15. After failing to reach a tentative agreement following the strike, the ResLife union would once again hold a successful strike authorization vote in August 2024 and begin striking on August 31. They would stop on September 6 at 4 PM.

=== Strikes ===
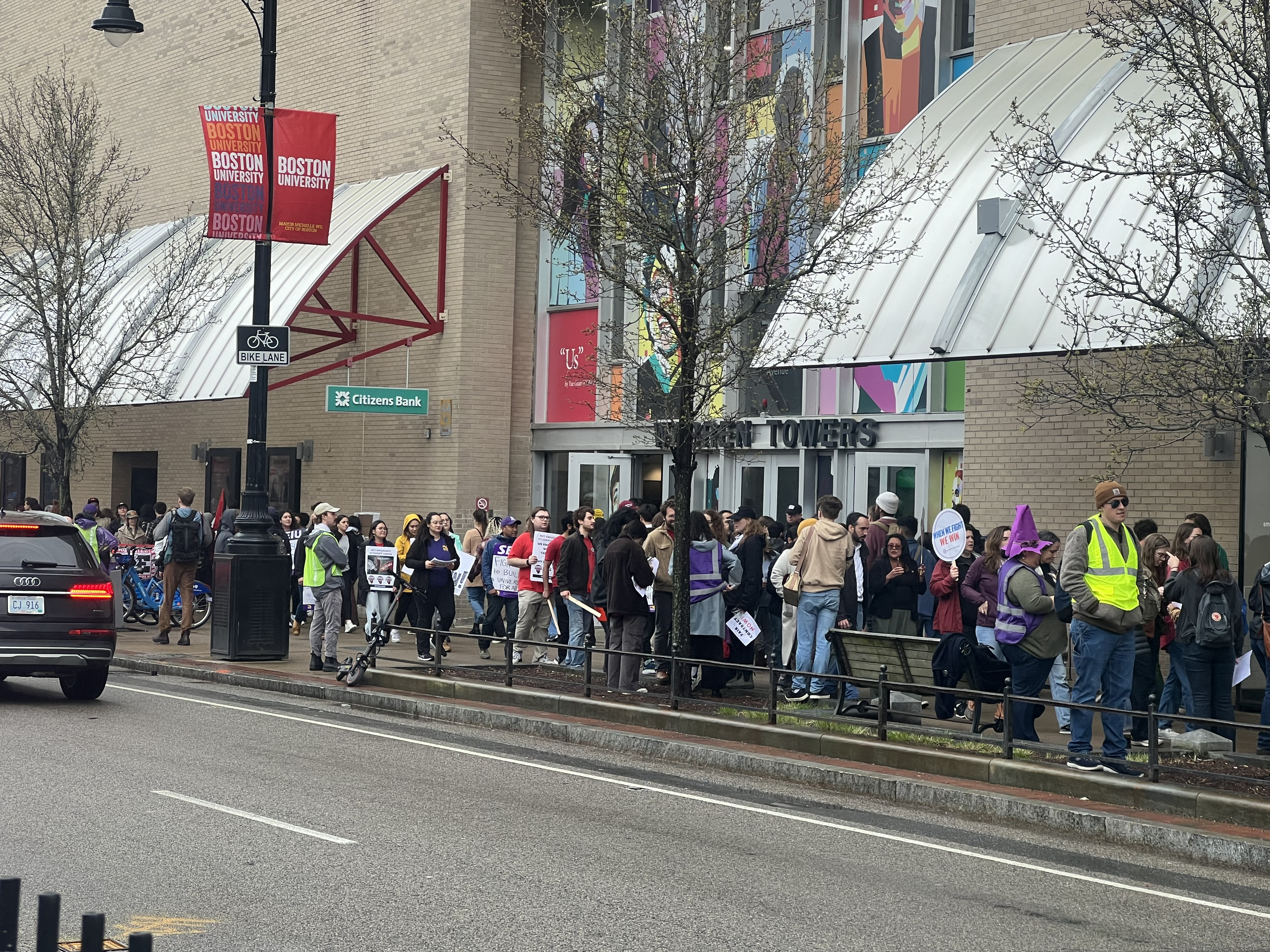
BUGWU, BU ResLife Union, and others in solidarity march in front of Warren Towers

After the strike authorization vote passed and bargaining was unsuccessful, the union began a four-day strike, from April 12 to 15. The union stated that they would not fulfill ResLife responsibilities during the strike, such as being on-call or holding conflict mediation. The strike coincided with the 2024 Boston Marathon, a school holiday that sees many parties held, and ran concurrently with the ongoing BUGWU strike.

The ResLife union would vote in favor by 90% to authorize a second strike, again concurrent with the ongoing BUGWU strike, which began on August 31, 2024 with RAs staging a walkout. Initial numbers reported approximately 50 of the 300 union members are striking, though BU has reported the number has grown to around 75. The initial strike coincided with move-in dates for students and did not specify whether it would last for a specific period like the previous strike, though it was later confirmed to be an open-ended strike.

==== University Reaction ====
During the first ResLife strike in April, the university stated that they would continue to allow workers to access their rooms and dining plans, not charging them a daily rate. The university also stated that professional ResLife staff would fill in during strike.

As a result of the second strike, BU would send a letter after a September 5, 2024 bargaining session that they would begin to charge for room and dining plans for striking union workers. This would result in the ending of the strike a day later.

==== Contract ====
The BU ResLife Union would reach a tentative agreement on September 17, 2024 that would cover most of the union's demands, including new policies on fair compensation, meal plans, just cause protection, and GPA policies being changed. The contract would be ratified with a 100% yes vote on September 27, 2024.

== See also ==
- Student protest
- 1979 Boston University strike
- Graduate student employee unionization
