= 1979 Boston University strike =

1979 labor strike in Boston, Massachusetts, US

- Date: April 5–14, 1979 (Faculty, 1 week and 2 days); April 5–23, 1979 (Clerical workers and librarians, 2 weeks and 4 days)
- Location: Boston, Massachusetts, United States
- Caused by: Disagreements over terms of a new labor contract
- Methods: Picketing; Strike action
- Result: 32.5 percent pay increase for faculty; Union recognition for clerical workers and librarians

Parties
Boston University - American Association of University Professors; Boston University Staff Organizing Committee (Distributive Workers of America District 65); Service Employees International Union Local 925	Boston University

The 1979 Boston University strike was a labor strike involving employees at Boston University, a private university in Boston, Massachusetts, United States. The strike was participated by faculty members, clerical workers, and librarians, which began on April 5 up to April 23.

The changes and regulations implemented under the presidency of John Silber, who became president of the university in 1971, were the major reasons behind the strike. Over the next few years, Silber made many changes that proved unpopular with the university's faculty, and in 1975, the university's chapter of the American Association of University Professors (BU-AAUP) voted to act as a collective bargaining unit. Silber initially challenged the legality of the union, but by 1978, a court ruling mandated that the university had to commence negotiations with the union. Over the next few months, neither side came to a solid agreement, with pay increases being a particular point of contention.

In early 1979, the union began preparing for strike action, and on April 5, following a disagreement over a tentative agreement that had previously been reached, the union went on strike. That same day, clerical workers and librarians (unionized under the Distributive Workers of America and the Service Employees International Union, respectively) also voted to go on strike, partially in an act of solidarity with the AAUP and partially as a way to receive union recognition. The strike resulted in the cancellation of several hundred classes and particularly affected the College of Liberal Arts. On April 14, the faculty voted to end the strike after the university agreed to the previous tentative agreement, with the provision that they not perform any sort of sympathy strike with other unions. The clerical workers and librarians remained on strike for several more days despite this, and some professors tried to hold classes on locations away from the university as a show of solidarity with the strikers. They finally ended their strike on April 23 after the university agreed to recognize the two unions.

A year after the strike, the U.S. Supreme Court ruled that faculty at private universities were not protected to unionize under the terms of the National Labor Relations Act of 1935, and as a result, when the BU-AAUP's contract expired in 1982, the union became decertified. For this reason, historian Gary Zabel calls the strike a Pyrrhic victory for the faculty.

== Background ==
=== President Silber and opposition from faculty ===
In 1971, academic John Silber became the president of Boston University (BU). Silber had previously worked at the University of Texas at Austin, where he had established a reputation as a New Deal liberal. However, by the late 1960s, Silber had grown hostile to the New Left and student activist groups such as the Students for a Democratic Society and embraced a more rigidly conservative stance on politics. Early in his presidency at BU, Silber made a series of decisions that proved unpopular with members of the university's faculty. In particular, Silber pushed for departments to hire friends of his at an inflated pay and vetoed some recommendations for academic tenure, particularly for professors who had expressed a left-leaning political stance. By 1976, the faculty senate for BU voted 377–117 in a vote of no confidence, asking Silber to resign, as did eight members of the BU board of trustees. Additionally, the Massachusetts branch of the American Civil Liberties Union (ACLU) accused Silber in 1979 of violating academic freedom and basic civil liberties, stating that they had never received as many complaints targeting a single institution as they had with regards to Silber's administration at BU.

Around the same time that Silber joined BU, there had been a nationwide push for unionization among professors at American universities. In 1967, the first labor union representing professors at a bachelor degree granting college was established as a local union of the American Federation of Teachers at what is now the University of Massachusetts Dartmouth. By 1975, dozens of universities and over 200 two-year colleges were unionized, representing approximately 15 percent of all professors in the United States. The American Association of University Professors (AAUP), a professional association that primarily concerned itself with defending academic freedom, also became involved in this wave when several of its university chapters began to engage in collective bargaining with their universities. In May 1975, the BU chapter of the AAUP (which represented 440 of BU's almost 850 fulltime professors) held a representation election, supervised by the National Labor Relations Board, that lead to the BU-AAUP becoming a collective bargaining union. However, the university refused to recognize the union and engaged in a legal dispute that led to an April 1978 order by the United States Court of Appeals for the First Circuit that the university had to recognize the union and enter into negotiations with it. While the university appealed the decision to the United States Supreme Court, they still had to commence negotiations while their appeal was pending.

=== Clerical workers and librarians organize ===
As the faculty was organizing, the clerical workers and librarians were working alongside them. Shortly after BU-AAUP held its representation election, these workers formed the Boston University Staff Organizing Committee, which consisted of about 800 clerical workers. This group, which published a newsletter and communicated with clerical workers at other universities such as Harvard University and the Massachusetts Institute of Technology, unionized with the New York City-based Distributive Workers of America District 65. Meanwhile, a group of about 25 librarians unionized with Local 925. This local union was a joint collaboration organized by the Service Employees International Union and 9to5, National Association of Working Women, a feminist labor organization that had been founded in Boston in 1973. Both of these unions had held representation elections of their own by 1979, but the university refused to negotiate with them and instead filed legal action wherein they questioned the legitimacy of the elections.

=== Tentative agreement reached ===
While negotiations continued between the university and BU-AAUP, both sides began to prepare for possible strike action. The union and university were primarily at odds with regards to pay increases, highlighted by a letter released by a trustee in January 1979 that read, "More than anything else, we seek tranquility on campus. But if this university is to be shut down, it is better that it be shut down by a strike than as a bankrupt institution." At the time, the university stated that the union was seeking a 44 percent pay increase over the duration of the three-year contract, which the trustees stated would seriously hurt the university financially. By March, the union had reduced this amount to 14 percent for the first year and two smaller amounts for the next two years of the contract, but the two sides remained at an impasse. That same month, the union voted to strike on March 21 and March 22 unless progress was made in negotiations, but this was called off on March 20. However, the union also voted to strike on April 4 unless an agreement had been made by March 30. On March 31, the university and union came to an agreement that would see changes in governance and tenure rules as well as a 32.4 percent salary increase over the course of the three-year contract. Additionally, the contract would expire at the beginning of that year's academic term, which the union felt increased their leverage in future contract negotiations by allowing for strike action that would affect that academic term.

As part of the agreement (which was solidified with a public handshaking between Silber and negotiators), both side's bargaining units would present the agreements for deliberation amongst their respective sides for a maximum of 72 hours before a straightforward yea or nay vote. On April 2, faculty members voted 252–17 to approve the contract, while the following day the board of trustees were set to vote. However, instead of voting, the board asked for changes to the contract that would have moved the contract's expiration date to the end of the academic term and barred governance from counting towards faculty member's service requirements. The previous day, Silber had held a closed-doors meeting at the Algonquin Club with several prominent members of the board. According to historian Gary Zabel, the decision to ask for these changes had been determined then. The union was outraged with this reneging, and on April 3, BU-AAUP member and sociology professor George Psathas interrupted Silber while he was lecturing at the Boston University School of Law to announce that the faculty would strike on April 5.

== Course of the strike ==
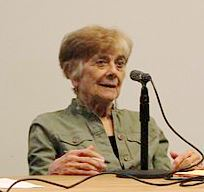
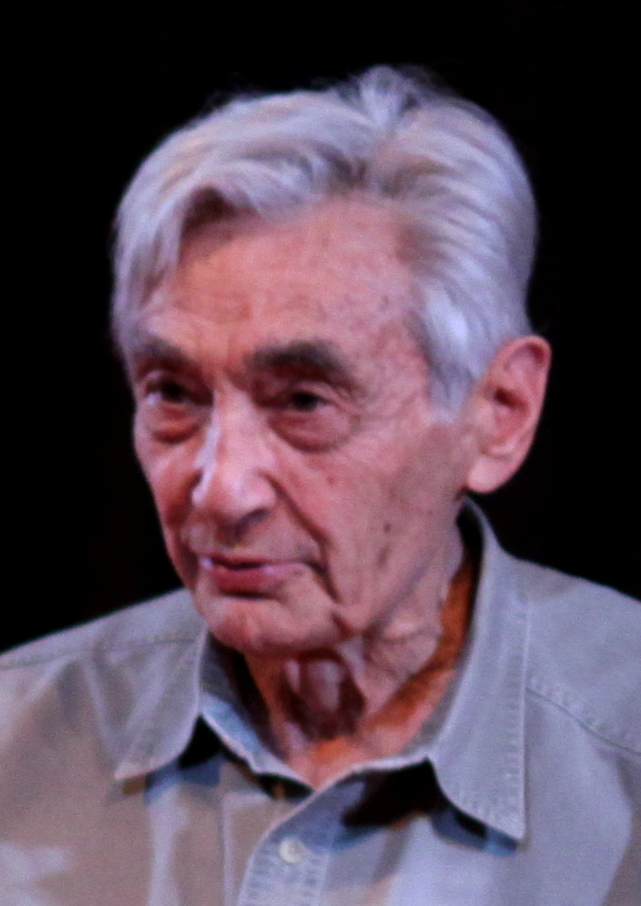
BU professors Frances Fox Piven (left) and Howard Zinn were both involved in the strike.

The strike commenced on the morning of April 5, with picketing occurring throughout BU's campus. About 400 professors participated, with some picketing with signs that included quotes from Paul the Apostle, William Shakespeare, and Voltaire. BU's student newspaper The Daily Free Press reported that many undergraduate students were supportive of the strike, and that support from graduate students was even stronger, with several grad students forming the Graduate Employees Organizing Committee to coordinate support. By the end of the first day, the union reported that about 100 percent of the professors in the College of Liberal Arts were on strike. However, the majority of the professors in both the College of Engineering and the School of Law continued to hold classes. According to The Harvard Crimson, about 80 percent of the roughly 900 professors at BU cancelled their classes for the day. Shortly after the strike began, the clerical workers and librarians voted to also go on strike, both as a representation strike and as a solidarity action with the faculty members. Additional support for the strike came from the maintenance workers, whose union allowed members to participate in the strike on an individual basis. On the first day, The New York Times reported that the events at BU were "something like a general strike". On April 9, the students' union at BU announced they were filing a class-action lawsuit seeking tuition reimbursement for classes cancelled due to the strike.

After about one week, the university moved to end the strike by approving the tentative agreement as it was originally written, though with an agreement that BU-AAUP would not participate in sympathy strikes, effectively meaning that the faculty would go back to work despite the clerical workers and librarians continuing to strike. While some faculty members wished to continue the strike in support of District 65 and Local 925, many members of the BU-AAUP were expressing a desire to return to work, and prominent member Marx W. Wartofsky urged the members to agree to the deal. On April 14, the union voted 271–23 to approve the contract. A majority of the professors returned to work, though some refused to hold classes and others, such as Frances Fox Piven and Howard Zinn, tried to hold classes in locations outside of the university. The Harvard Crimson reported that up to 150 professors were holding classes in this manner in order to show some solidarity with the other unions. Meanwhile, District 65 and Local 925 continued to strike until Silber covertly told them that the administration would agree to recognize the unions if they called off their strike and did not make public his communications with them. The unions approved and ended their strike as well, having gained recognition and new labor contracts. Their strike officially ended on April 23.

== Aftermath ==
Following the strike, Silber sought to fire five professors who remained on strike in support of District 65 and Local 925, including Zinn, but a campaign organized by Nobel Prize-winner George Wald caused Silber to abandon these efforts. In December 1979, the faculty once again voted to urge for Silber's removal, but these calls were dismissed by Silber and other members of the board of trustees. In 1980, the U.S. Supreme Court ruled in the court case NLRB v. Yeshiva University that professors at private universities were not protected to unionize under the terms of the National Labor Relations Act of 1935, as they held managerial powers. As a result, in 1982, when the labor contract with BU-AAUP expired, the university sought and attained decertification for the union. In retrospect, Zabel called the strike a Pyrrhic victory and stated that Silber's eventual success in breaking the union was emblematic of university administrations' efforts to "regain lost ground" following the radical period of the 1960s and 1970s. In spite of the opposition he faced, Silber managed to solidify his power amongst the university's administration, and remained the university's president until his resignation in 2000.

== See also ==
- 2024 Boston University strike

== Sources ==
- Zabel, Gary (2009). "The Boston University Strike of 1979". In Brenner, Aaron; Day, Benjamin; Ness, Immanuel (eds.). The Encyclopedia of Strikes in American History. M. E. Sharpe. pp. 690–697. ISBN 978-1-317-45707-7.
