= American Association of University Professors =

Nonprofit charitable organization

- Formation: 1915
- Type: Nonprofit charitable organization
- Headquarters: Washington D.C.
- Location: United States
- Members: Professors and professional university staff
- Official language: English
- Executive Director: Mia McIver
- President: Todd Wolfson
- Website: www.aaup.org

The American Association of University Professors (AAUP) is an organization of professors and other academics in the United States that was founded in 1915 in New York City and is headquartered in Washington, D.C. AAUP membership includes over 500 local campus chapters and 30 state organizations. In 2026, there were approximately 42,000 members.

Since June 2022, the AAUP has been affiliated with the American Federation of Teachers.

The AAUP's stated mission is to advance academic freedom and shared governance, to define fundamental professional values and standards for higher education, and to ensure higher education's contribution to the common good. Founded in 1915 by Arthur O. Lovejoy and John Dewey, the AAUP has helped shape American higher education by developing standards and procedures that maintain quality in education and academic freedom in the country's colleges and universities.

== Background ==
=== Issues around academic freedom and tenure before the AAUP ===
In the 1890s and early 1900s, there were a number of attempts to dismiss college faculty members from their academic posts, including a failed attempt to dismiss Richard Ely at the University of Wisconsin in 1894. Edward Bemis was dismissed from a post at the University of Chicago in 1895 and George D. Herron from one at Grinnell College in 1899.

Perhaps most prominent of these incidents was the 1900 dismissal of eugenicist, economics professor, and sociologist Edward Alsworth Ross from Stanford University. Ross's work criticizing the employment of Chinese laborers by the Southern Pacific Railroad, run by Stanford's founder Leland Stanford, led Leland's widow, Jane Stanford, to intervene and, over the president's and faculty's objections, succeed in getting Ross dismissed. A number of faculty colleagues resigned in protest, including Arthur O. Lovejoy.

== History ==
After resigning from Stanford, Lovejoy taught at several universities before landing at Johns Hopkins in 1910. In 1913, he convinced 17 other full professors to reach out to professors at nine other universities inviting them "to discuss the need for a society of professors from all fields".

In January 1915, the Association of University Professors was formed after a series of meetings held at the Chemists' Club in New York City. John Dewey served as president of the organization and Lovejoy as secretary.

In February 1915, the dismissals of two professors and two instructors at the University of Utah by President Joseph T. Kingsbury—and the subsequent resignations of 14 faculty members in protest—launched the AAUP's first institutional academic freedom inquest. An earlier 1911 controversy at Brigham Young University in Provo, Utah, had involved some of the same professors.

The AAUP's involvement in the case happened somewhat by accident. In April 1915, Lovejoy read in the Evening Post that it was "impossible to judge the merits of the case, but that the facts would doubtless be investigated by the newly formed Association of University Professors and would duly be given the public in time." He then felt it was the AAUP's duty to investigate the case further.

In December 1915, the inaugural volume of the Bulletin of the American Association of University Professors was published, including the document now known as the 1915 Declaration of Principles on Academic Freedom and Academic Tenure—the AAUP's foundational statement on the rights and corresponding obligations of members of the academic profession.

=== Censured institutions ===
The AAUP censures institutions that violate standards of academic freedom and tenure and sanctions institutions that have infringed university governance standards through "serious departures by the administration and/or governing board from generally accepted standards of college and university government".

In 1930, the University of Mississippi, Mississippi State University, and Mississippi University for Women were placed on a list of "non-recommended" institutions after Mississippi Governor and Ku Klux Klan member Theodore G. Bilbo fired all three institutions' presidents as well as 179 faculty members.

The censure list was officially created in 1938. Between that year and 2002, 183 colleges and universities were placed on the list at various times. As of 2024, 59 institutions are on AAUP's censure list.

=== Conflict with religious institutions ===
In its 1940 statement on academic freedom, there was a carve-out that permitted religious institutions to limit academic freedom if the limitations were clearly stated. In 1970, the AAUP criticized its 1940 statement, positing that most religious institutions "no longer need or desire" to limit academic freedom.

In 1988, the AAUP offered another interpretation, that the "1970 de-endorsement clause" requires a religious institution to forfeit its "right to represent itself as an 'authentic seat of higher learning.'" But the AAUP's Committee A did not endorse it, so whether a religious institution can limit academic freedom if those limitations are clearly stated appears to be unresolved.

The AAUP has censured numerous religious institutions, including the Catholic University of America in 1990 and Brigham Young University in 1998.

=== Collective bargaining ===
In 1979, the AAUP chapter at Boston University engaged in a strike that lasted one week. It was later decertified in 1982.

AAUP currently represents more than 65 collective bargaining affiliates nationwide, mainly in the public sector.

In 1980, the Supreme Court of the United States decided NLRB v. Yeshiva University, which created "major roadblocks to unionization" among "faculty members at private colleges and universities". Still, the AAUP has collective bargaining affiliates at several private colleges and universities, mainly where the chapter had already existed before 1980. AAUP collective bargaining chapters represent full-time faculty at private institutions, include those at Adelphi University, Bard College, Curry College, D'Youville University, Edward Waters University, Fairfield University, Hofstra University, LeMoyne-Owen College, Long Island University Arnold & Marie Schwartz College of Pharmacy, New York Institute of Technology, Niagara University, Oakland University, Rider University, St. John's University, the University of Scranton, and Utica University.

Among private institutions, the AAUP represents part-time faculty at Emerson College, Manhattanville University, and Suffolk University, among others.

Several university chapters have been involved in labor strikes, including Wright State University and Oregon Tech in 2021, and Rutgers University in 2023.

=== 21st century ===
The AAUP has released several reports on contingent faculty. In 2003, it released its major policy statement titled "Contingent Appointments and the Academic Profession". The statement made recommendations in two areas: increasing the proportion of faculty appointments that are on the tenure line as well as improving job security and due process protections for those with contingent appointments. In 2006, the AAUP adopted a policy dealing with job protections that should be afforded to part-time faculty members.

In 2009, AAUP began its reorganization among its think tank, its non-organized advocacy chapters, and its support for collective bargaining chapters.

Since 2010, the AAUP has published the Journal of Academic Freedom, an online-only open-access annual journal.

In 2022, after more than 10 years of a joint organizing agreement with the American Federation of Teachers (AFT), the two organizations agreed to expand their partnership, including sharing resources. AAUP President Irene Mulvey said the goal was to advocate for faculty's right to collective bargaining and expand organizing activities to community colleges and with graduate students in right-to-work states.

In August 2024, AAUP president Todd Wolfson called U.S. Senator JD Vance a "fascist" during that year's presidential election. This foreshadowed battles to come, as AAUP has opposed many of the Trump administration's higher education policies and sued to stop the recommended funding cuts to Ivy League institutions.

== Academic freedom and tenure ==
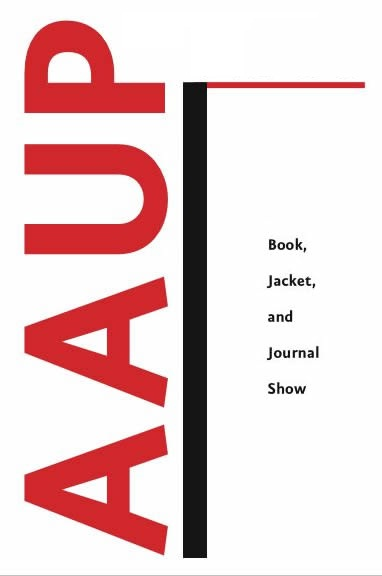
AAUP

As the AAUP details the history of its policy on academic freedom and tenure, the association maintains that there "are still people who want to control what professors teach and write." The AAUP's "Statement of Principles on Academic Freedom and Tenure" is the definitive articulation of the principles and practices and is widely accepted by the academic community. The association's procedures ensuring academic due process remain the model for professional employment practices on campuses throughout the country.

At the time, the ideas of academic freedom at the time were not entirely well received, and even the New York Times criticized the declaration, but that today the statement remains "almost as nearly inviolate as the U.S. Constitution."

The AAUP offers the original principles, including the 1940 interpretations of the statement and a 1970 interpretation, which codified evaluation of the principles since the time they were adopted. The statement is straightforward, based on three principles of academic freedom. Briefly summarized, the first principle says that teachers are entitled to "full freedom in research and in publication of the results" and that the issue of financial gains from research depends on the relationship with the institution. The second principle of academic freedom is that teachers should have the same freedom in the classroom. The third asserts that college and university professors are citizens and should be free to speak and write as citizens "free from institutional censorship."

According to the 1970 interpretation, the statement is not a "static code but a fundamental document to set a framework of norms to guide adaptations to changing times and circumstances." The commentary iterates key points of the 1940 interpretations. The statement does not discourage controversy but emphasizes professionalism, holding that professors should be careful "not to introduce into their teaching controversial matter which has no relation to their subject."

The statement is based on five principles:

1. The terms of appointment are to be stated in writing.
2. The conditions and length of time professors are given to attain tenure is clearly stated
3. During the probationary period before attaining tenure, the teacher "should have all the academic freedom that all other members of the faculty have."
4. Both the faculty and the institution's governing board should judge whether tenure is to be granted or denied and terms for appeal of the decision to deny tenure should be clearly stated.
5. If the faculty member is not granted tenure appointment for reasons of financial restraint upon the university, the "financial exigency should be demonstrably bona fide."

The interpretive statement also maintains that while professors have the rights of citizens, both scholars and educational officers "should remember that the public may judge their profession and their institution by their utterances", noting that every effort should be made "to indicate they are not speaking for the institution". The comments provide for further insights into the evaluation for tenure appointment and direct to the "1968 Recommended Institutional Regulations on Academic Freedom and Tenure", which recommends policy based upon the 1940 statement and later documents on standards for faculty dismissal.

=== Academic freedom and the Supreme Court ===
In Sweezy v. New Hampshire (1957), the Supreme Court of the United States acknowledged academic freedom's essential role as a protected right under the First Amendment. The case set a precedent that significantly influenced university policies nationwide, affirming the importance of academic discourse and inquiry without governmental interference. But "at the time of the Sweezy decision, the AAUP was deeply ambivalent about the constitutionalization of academic freedom, because some members feared the long-term consequences of having judges rather than professors elaborate and apply the protective rules of academic life."

In Keyishian v. Board of Regents (1967), the constitutionality of and legal basis for AAUP's principles of academic freedom were established.

== Shared governance in colleges and universities ==
The American Association of University Professors published its first "Statement on Government of Colleges and Universities" in 1920, "emphasizing the importance of faculty involvement in personnel decisions, selection of administrators, preparation of the budget, and determination of educational policies. Refinements to the statement were introduced in subsequent years, culminating in the 1966 "Statement on Government of Colleges and Universities."

The statement was jointly formulated by the American Association of University Professors, the American Council on Education (ACE), and the Association of Governing Boards of Universities and Colleges (AGB). It clarifies the respective roles of governing boards, faculties, and administrations. The document does not provide a "blueprint" to the governance of higher education.

The statement's purpose is not to provide principles for relations with industry and government, though it establishes direction on "the correction of existing weaknesses". Rather, the statement aims to establish a shared vision for the internal governance of institutions. Student involvement is not addressed in detail. The statement concerns general education policy and internal operations with an overview of the formal roles for governing structures in the organization and management of higher education.

=== Sanctioned institutions ===
Fourteen U.S. colleges are on AAUP's list of sanctioned institutions for violations of shared governance, include three community colleges, ten four-year colleges and universities, and an independent law school.

== Leadership ==
=== Presidents ===
Number	Name	Dates	Subject	Institution
1	John Dewey	1915–1916	Philosophy	Columbia University
2	John Henry Wigmore	1916–1917	Law	Northwestern University
3	Frank Thilly	1917–1918	Philosophy	Cornell University
4	John Merle Coulter	1918–1919	Botany	University of Chicago
5	Arthur Oncken Lovejoy	1919–1920	Philosophy	Johns Hopkins University
6	Edward Capps	1920–1921	Philology	Princeton University
7	Vernon Lyman Kellogg	1921 (acting)	Zoology	National Research Council
8	Edwin R. A. Seligman	1921–1922	Political Science	Columbia University
9	J. V. Denney	1922–1924	English	Ohio State University
10	Armin Otto Leuschner	1924–1926	Astronomy	University of California, Berkeley
11	William T. Semple	1926–1928	Classics	University of Cincinnati
12	Henry Crew	1928–1930	Physics	Northwestern University
13	William B. Munro	1930–1932	Government	Harvard University
14	Walter Wheeler Cook	1932–1933	Law	Johns Hopkins University
15	Samuel Alfred Mitchell	1934–1936	Astronomy	University of Virginia
16	Anton Julius Carlson	1936–1938	Physiology	University of Chicago
17	Mark H. Ingraham	1938–1940	Mathematics	University of Wisconsin
18	Frederick S. Deibler	1940–1942	Economics	Northwestern University
19	William Thomas Laprade	1942–1944	History	Duke University
20	Quincy Wright	1944–1946	International Law	University of Chicago
21	Edward C. Kirkland	1946–1948	History	Bowdoin College
22	Ralph H. Lutz	1948–1950	History	Stanford University
23	Richard Harrison Shryock	1950–1952	History	Johns Hopkins University
24	Fred B. Millett	1952–1954	English Literature	Wesleyan University
25	William E. Britton	1954–1956	Law	University of Illinois
26	Helen C. White	1956–1958	English	University of Wisconsin
27	Hiram Bentley Glass	1958–1960	Biology	Johns Hopkins University
28	Ralph F. Fuchs	1960–1962	Law	Indiana University
29	Fritz Machlup	1962–1964	Economics	Princeton University
30	David Fellman	1964–1966	Political Science	University of Wisconsin
31	Clark Byse	1966–1968	Law	Harvard University
32	Ralph S. Brown, Jr.	1968–1970	Law	Yale University
33	Sanford Kadish	1970–1972	Law	University of California, Berkeley
34	Walter Adams	1972–1974	Economics	Michigan State University
35	William Warner Van Alstyne	1974–1976	Law	Duke University
36	Peter O. Steiner	1976–1978	Law and Economics	University of Michigan
37	Martha Friedman	1978–1980	Library	University of Illinois Urbana-Champaign
38	Henry T. Yost	1980–1981	Biology	Amherst College
39	Robert A. Gorman	1981–1982	Law	University of Pennsylvania
40	Victor J. Stone	1982–1984	Law	University of Illinois, Urbana-Champaign
41	Paul H. L. Walter	1984–1986	Chemistry	Skidmore College
42	Julius G. Getman	1986–1988	Law	University of Texas at Austin
43	Carol Simpson Stern	1988–1990	Performance Studies	Northwestern University
44	Barbara Bergmann	1990–1992	Economics	American University
45	Linda Ray Pratt	1992–1994	English	University of Nebraska
46	James Perley	1994–1998	Biology	College of Wooster
47	James T. Richardson	1998–2000	Judicial Studies	University of Nevada, Reno
48	Jane Buck	2000–2006	Psychology	Delaware State University
49	Cary Nelson	2006–2012	English	University of Illinois, Urbana-Champaign
50	Rudy Fichtenbaum	2012–2020	Economics	Wright State University
51	Irene Mulvey	2020–2024	Mathematics	Fairfield University
52	Todd Wolfson	2024–present	Media Studies	Rutgers University–New Brunswick

=== Secretaries, general secretaries, and executive directors ===
Apart from the elected leadership, the AAUP has been led in its day-to-day operations by what has been at various times called a secretary, later a general secretary, and most recently an executive director, and includes the following people:

Name	Dates	Title
Arthur Oncken Lovejoy	1915–1929	Secretary
Harry Walter Tyler	1929–1933	General Secretary
Walter Wheeler Cook	1934–1935	General Secretary
Harry Walter Tyler	1935–1936	Acting General Secretary
Ralph Himstead	1936–1955	General Secretary
George P. Shannon	1955	Acting General Secretary
Ralph F. Fuchs	1955–1957	General Secretary
Robert K. Carr	1957–1958	General Secretary
William P. Fidler	1958–1967	General Secretary
Bertram H. Davis	1967–1974	General Secretary
Joseph Duffey	1974–1976	General Secretary
Jordan E. Kurland	1977	Acting General Secretary
Morton S. Baratz	1977–1979	General Secretary
Martha Friedman	1979–1980	Interim General Secretary
Irving J. Spitzberg, Jr.	1980–1984	General Secretary
Ernst Benjamin	1984–1994	General Secretary
Mary A. Burgan	1994–2004	General Secretary
Roger W. Bowen	2004–2007	General Secretary
Ernst Benjamin	2007–2008	Interim General Secretary
Gary Rhoades	2009–2011	General Secretary
Martin Snyder	2011–2013	Senior Associate General Secretary
Julie Schmid	2013–2023	Executive Director
Nancy Long	2023–2024	Interim Executive Director
Aaron Nielson	2024–2025	Interim Executive Director
Mia McIver	2025–present	Executive Director

== See also ==
- National Conference of University Professors (UK)
- Professors in the United States
- University organizations (annotated list)
