= Irene Mulvey =

American mathematician

- Education: Wesleyan University (PhD)
- Occupation: Mathematician
- Employer: Fairfield University
- Organization: American Association of University Professors

Irene Mulvey is an American mathematician and progressive activist.

== Career ==
Mulvey completed her doctoral dissertation, titled Periodic, Recurrent and Non-Wandering Points for Continuous Maps of the Circle at Wesleyan University in 1982, where she was advised by Ethan Coven. She was appointed to a professorship at Fairfield University in 1985.

=== President of the American Association of University Professors ===
In July 2020, Mulvey was elected president of the American Association of University Professors, succeeding Rudy Fichtenbaum, serving in that role until June 2024. During her tenure as AAUP President, she claimed that state bills targeted at diversity, equity and inclusion programs damage not only higher education but also democracy.
