= Studies in Applied Mathematics =

- Discipline: Applied Mathematics
- Language: English

Publication details
- Former name(s): Journal of Mathematics and Physics
- History: 1920–present
- Publisher: Wiley–Blackwell (U.S.)
- Frequency: 8/year
- Impact factor: 3.000 (2020)

Standard abbreviations
- ISO 4: Stud. Appl. Math.

Indexing
- ISSN: 0022-2526 (print); 1467-9590 (web)

Links
- Journal homepage

The journal Studies in Applied Mathematics is published by Wiley–Blackwell on behalf of the Massachusetts Institute of Technology.

It features scholarly articles on mathematical applications in allied fields, notably computer science, mechanics, astrophysics, geophysics, biophysics, and high-energy physics. Its pedigree came from the Journal of Mathematics and Physics which was founded by the MIT Mathematics Department in 1920. The Journal changed to its present name in 1969.

The journal was edited from 1969 by David Benney of the Department of Mathematics, Massachusetts Institute of Technology.

According to ISI Journal Citation Reports, in 2020, it ranked 26th among the 265 journals in the Applied Mathematics category.
