= George B. Thomas =

American mathematician

- Born: January 11, 1914; Boise, Idaho, U.S.
- Died: October 31, 2006 (aged 92); State College, Pennsylvania, U.S.
- Education: Cornell University
- Scientific career
- Fields: Mathematics
- Workplaces: Massachusetts Institute of Technology
- Doctoral advisor: Burton Wadsworth Jones

George Brinton Thomas Jr. (January 11, 1914 – October 31, 2006) was an American mathematician and professor of mathematics at the Massachusetts Institute of Technology (MIT). Internationally, he is best known for being the author of the widely used calculus textbook Calculus and Analytic Geometry, known today as Thomas' Textbook.

== Early life ==
Born in Boise, Idaho, Thomas' early years were difficult. His father, George Brinton Thomas Sr., was a bank employee, and his mother, Georgia Fay Thomas (née Goin), died in the 1919 Influenza Epidemic, just eight days before his fifth birthday. His father remarried shortly thereafter, to Lena Steward. They lived in a tent with a wooden floor and a coal stove.

After his stepmother Lena died from complications due to childbirth, the father and son moved to the Spokane Valley in Washington State, where they both attended Spokane University. George Thomas Sr. married again, to Gertrude Alice Johnson. Thomas began attending Washington State College (now Washington State University), after Spokane University went bankrupt. There, he earned a B.A. in 1934 and an M.A. in 1936, both in mathematics and mathematics education.

On August 15, 1936, Thomas married Jane Heath at her family's home in South Bend, Washington. The couple lived in Pullman, Washington for a year; Thomas worked at a local shoe store to save money for further graduate education.

In 1937, Thomas was accepted into the graduate mathematics program at Cornell University, where he worked as an instructor while pursuing his research in number theory.

== Academic career ==
Thomas finished his doctoral work in 1940 and was immediately hired by MIT for a one-year teaching appointment. He was well liked at MIT, and was invited to join the faculty after his teaching fellowship ended.

During the Second World War, Thomas was involved in early computation systems and programmed the differential analyzer to calculate firing tables for the Navy.

In 1952, George and Jane Thomas moved into the Conantum community in Concord, Massachusetts, where many younger Harvard and MIT faculty members lived.

=== Calculus and Analytic Geometry ===
In 1951, Addison-Wesley was then a new publishing company specializing in textbooks and technical literature. The management was unhappy with the calculus textbook they were then publishing, so they approached Thomas, asking if he could revise the book. Instead, he went ahead with an entirely new book. The first edition came out in 1952; Calculus and Analytic Geometry became one of the most famous and widely used texts on the subject. For many of the later editions (from the 5th onwards), Thomas was assisted by co-author Ross L. Finney, which gave rise to the text's metonym Thomas & Finney; such was its ubiquity in calculus teaching.

==== Thomas' Calculus ====
Following Ross Finney's death in 2000, the text has simply been known as Thomas' Calculus from the 10th edition onward. The 15th edition, now edited by contemporary authors, is the most recent version of the text.

=== Commitment to education ===
Thomas became involved with math and science education in America's primary and secondary schools some years before the Soviet Union launched Sputnik. From 1955 to 1957, he served on the board of governors of the Mathematical Association of America and was the group's first vice president from 1958 to 1959.

From 1956 to 1959, he served on the executive committee of the mathematics division of the American Society for Engineering Education. He also served on the Commission on Mathematics of the College Entrance Examination Board. Thomas used the positions to speak out on mathematics education reform in high schools and universities.

In the late 1950s, Thomas went to India with a grant from the Ford Foundation to train mathematics instructors.

At MIT, Thomas continued to teach recitation sections at MIT, normally taught by grad students, until at least 1977, eschewing the big lecture hall for more hands-on teaching of 20-30 students twice a week.

== Later life ==
Jane Thomas died in 1975 from breast cancer. In 1980, Thomas married Thais Erving; she died in 1983, also from breast cancer.

In 1978, Thomas retired from full-time teaching, although he continued to edit new editions of Calculus and Analytic Geometry. He became interested in religion, attending the Unity Church and later taking up Christian Science.

On October 31, 2006, Thomas died in Foxdale Village at State College, Pennsylvania, a retirement community centered around the needs of retired academics.

== Books ==
- Thomas, George B. (1951). Calculus and Analytic Geometry. Addison Wesley.
- Thomas, George B.; Frederick Mosteller; R.E.K. Rourke (1961). Probability and Statistics. Addison Wesley.

== See also ==
- MIT Mathematics Department
- Mathematics education in the United States
