= MIT Department of Mathematics =

Academic department at the Massachusetts Institute of Technology

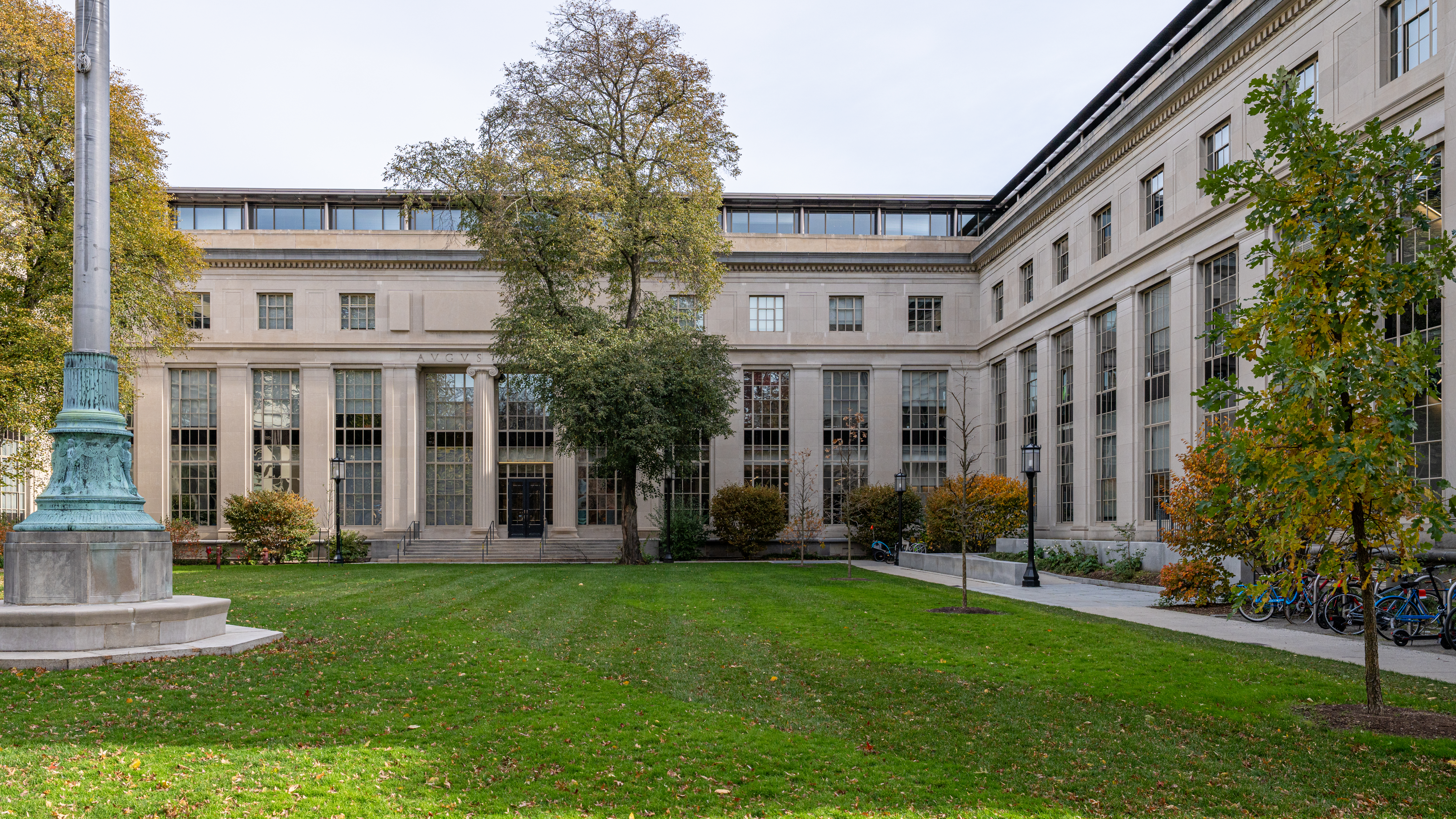
The Simons Building (Building 2)

The Department of Mathematics is a department of the MIT School of Sciences at the Massachusetts Institute of Technology.

The current faculty of around 50 members includes Wolf Prize winner Michael Artin, Shaw Prize winner George Lusztig, Gödel Prize winner Peter Shor, and numerical analyst Gilbert Strang.

== History ==
Originally under John Daniel Runkle, mathematics at MIT was regarded as service teaching for engineers. Harry W Tyler succeeded Runkle after his death in 1902, and continued as its head until 1930. Tyler had been exposed to modern European mathematics and was influenced by Felix Klein and Max Noether. Much of the early work was on geometry.

Norbert Wiener, famous for his contribution to the mathematics of signal processing, joined the MIT faculty in 1919. By 1920, the department started publishing the Journal of Mathematics and Physics (in 1969 renamed as Studies in Applied Mathematics), a sign of its growing confidence; the first PhD was conferred to James E Taylor in 1925.

Among illustrious members of the faculty were Norman Levinson and Gian-Carlo Rota. George B. Thomas wrote the widely used calculus textbook Calculus and Analytical Geometry, known today as Thomas' Calculus. Longtime faculty member Arthur Mattuck received several awards for his teaching of MIT undergraduates.

== Rankings and reputation ==
In the 2023 U.S. News & World Report rankings of the U.S. graduate programs for mathematics, MIT's program was ranked tied for first place, with Princeton University.
