= Harry Walter Tyler =

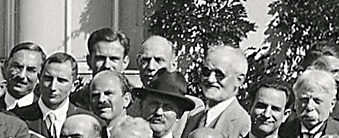
- Tyler (3rd from right, with sun glasses) at the International Congress of Mathematicians, Zürich 1932
- Born: April 16, 1863; Ipswich, Massachusetts, U.S.
- Died: February 3, 1938 (aged 74); Washington D.C., U.S.
- Education: BS, Chemistry 1884; PhD, 1889
- Alma mater: Massachusetts Institute of Technology (B.S., 1884); Universität Erlangen (Ph.D., 1889)
- Spouse: Alice Irving Brown
- Scientific career
- Fields: Chemistry, Mathematics
- Institutions: Massachusetts Institute of Technology
- Theses: The Decomposition of Hexane at High Temperatures (1884); Beziehungen zwischen der Sylvester'schen und der Bézout'schen Determinante (1889)
- Doctoral advisors: Paul Gordan, Max Noether

Harry Walter Tyler (April 16, 1863 – February 3, 1938) was an American chemist and university administrator. He was an active member of the science and education scholarly communities in the late 19th and early 20th centuries. After receiving his Bachelor of Science from the Massachusetts Institute of Technology (MIT) in 1884, he taught and served in various administrative positions at the Institute from 1884 until his retirement in 1930.

== Career ==
Outside of MIT he was a founding member of both the College Entrance Examination Board in 1901 and the History of Science Society in 1924.

He served as secretary of the American Association of University Professors (AAUP) for twenty years, and as leader of the organization from 1930-1933 and again from 1935 to 1936.

After retiring from MIT, he worked in Washington, D.C., at the Library of Congress as Consultant in Science, and later as Honorary Consultant.

== See also ==
- MIT Mathematics Department
