= Ralph S. Brown =

American lawyer

Ralph Sharp Brown (1913–1998) was a law professor at Yale Law School from 1946 to 1983 and an expert on competition, copyright law, government security and individual rights. After his 1983 retirement to emeritus status he taught at New York Law School until 1998. He was co-author, with Benjamin Kaplan of the Harvard Law School, of one of the first casebooks on copyright and unfair competition law. Brown was also a recognized expert in legal rights and issues relating to defamation, privacy, and publicity.

== Life and career ==
Brown was born April 1, 1913, in Federalsburg, Maryland, and graduated from Phillips Exeter Academy. He received a B.A. in 1935 and an LL.B. in 1939 from Yale. After law school, he joined the New York firm of Wright, Gordon, Zachry & Parlin (1940–41), then moved to Washington to serve as a lawyer in the Office of Price Administration (1941–42), but joined the Navy and served from 1942-46. He was appointed to the Yale law faculty in 1946 after returning from naval service in World War II.

At Yale Law School, he served as associate dean from 1965 to 1970. For many years, he was a member of the board of governors of the Yale University Press (YUP), and served as chairman of YUP's Committee on Publications from 1966 to 1979. Brown was a member of the national board of directors of the American Civil Liberties Union (ACLU) from 1955 to 1991 and served on its executive committee, 1970-1974 and 1986-1990. He was a member of the council of the American Association of University Professors (AAUP) 1958-1960 and 1964-1967. He served as president of AAUP, 1968-1970, and general counsel, 1983-1986. Professor Brown chaired that organization's Committee on Academic Freedom and Tenure from 1973-1975. He was a founding board member of the Society of American Law Teachers. He died on June 17, 1998.

One of the basic themes in Brown's writing was the importance to consumers of not letting intellectual property protection expand too far into what had been the public domain, in the name of suppressing "free riders." In a 1986 paper he gave on "the kind of free-riding that both arouses moral indignation in some people, and arguably saps the initiative of innovators," he examined the difficulties of the various proposed solutions and suggested:

The fourth possibility is to do nothing. Let the free-riders ride. This is often a good thing; for consumers it is such a good thing that I will not take time to defend it. It does require judges to be deaf to complaints that "It isn't fair."

Brown followed this up with an admonition to the bar: "Do not be greedy; do not try to pile one on top of the other. . . . I think it's unholy, if not unconstitutional, to carve up the public domain."
