= Rudy Fichtenbaum =

American academic

Rudy H. Fichtenbaum is an American economist. He is a professor emeritus at Wright State University, and in 2012, was elected the president of the American Association of University Professors.

On February 19, 2026 he was removed by judicial order from his position as board chair of the Ohio State Teachers Retirement System for corruption. He was found to have violated his fiduciary duty by secretly communicating with outside financial start-ups in order to steer a contract award.
