= Edward Webster Bemis =

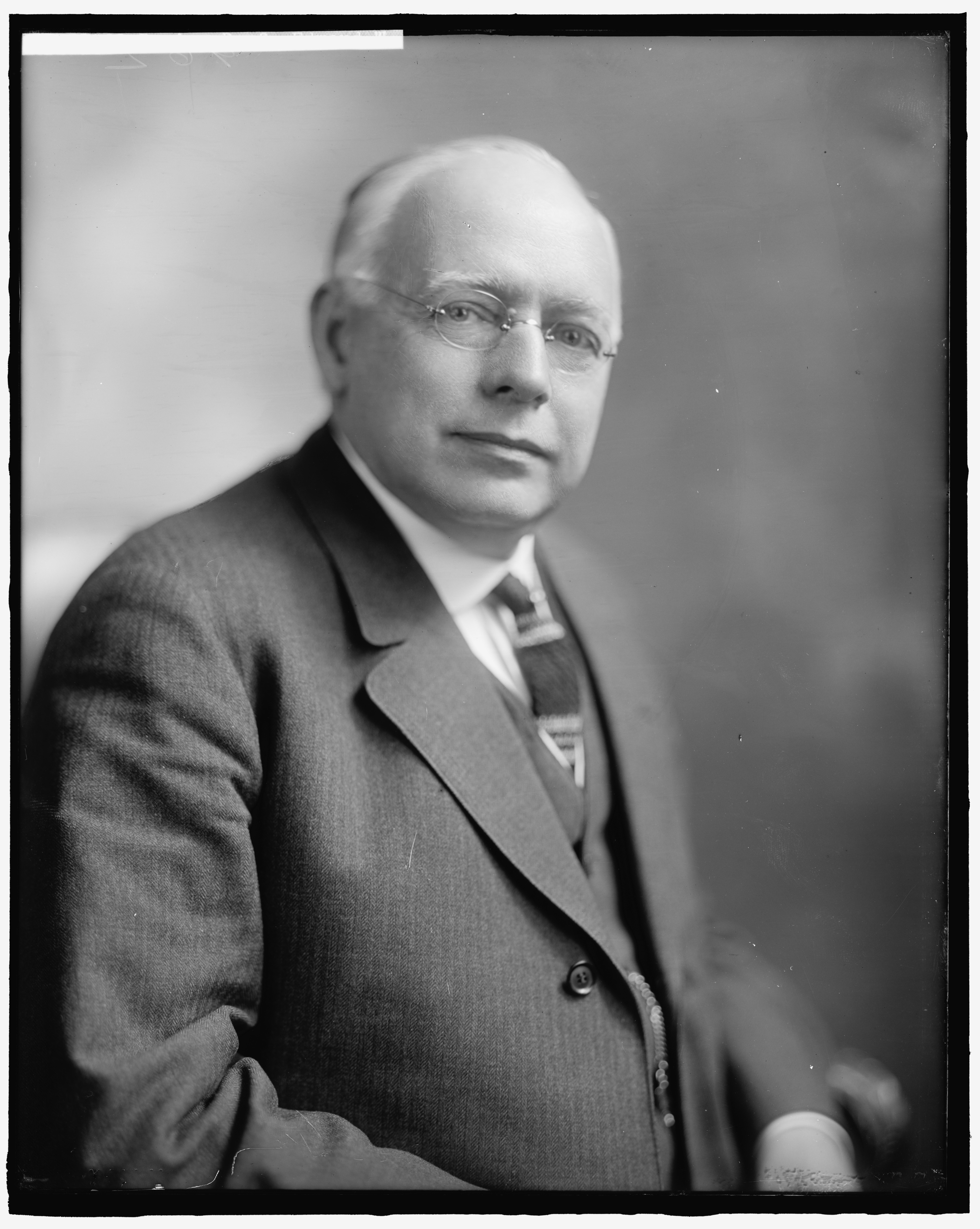
- Born: April 7, 1860; Springfield, Massachusetts
- Died: September 25, 1930 (aged 70)

Edward Webster Bemis (7 April 1860 – 25 September 1930) was an American economist and a public utility expert. He was a proponent of municipal ownership.

== Biography ==
He graduated from Amherst College in 1880, and received a degree of PhD in 1885 at Johns Hopkins University after over three years' advanced work in economics and history. In 1887 he suggested the use of literacy test as a device to restrict the total number of immigrants coming into the United States. He was a pioneer lecturer in the university extension system, 1887–1888; professor of economics and history, Vanderbilt University, 1889–1892; and associate professor of economics, University of Chicago, 1892–1895. At the latter institution, he was obligated to leave either because of his “radical” viewpoint or that he simply was not a good lecturer. He was assistant statistician to the Illinois bureau of labour statistics in 1896, and in 1897 he was professor of economics and history in the Kansas State Agricultural College.

He was superintendent of the city water department of Cleveland, Ohio, 1901–1909; deputy commissioner of water supply, gas and electricity of New York City, 1910; consulting expert for cities and states on public utilities after 1910. He became a member of the advisory board, valuation division, Interstate Commerce Commission; city representative on board of supervising engineers, Chicago Traction; and director of valuations of public utilities for the District of Columbia, the city of Dallas, Texas, and other places.

== Works ==
- History of Co-operation in the United States (1888)
- Municipal Ownership of Gas in the U.S. (1891)
- The Homestead Strike (1894)
- Municipal Monopolies (1899)

He did many scientific studies of co-operation, trades unions, immigration, etc., but after 1900 chiefly confined his writing to technical reports for various public bodies.

== Family ==
He married Annie L. Sargent on 28 October 1889, and they had three children.

== Footnotes ==
- Rines, George Edwin, ed. (1920). "Bemis, Edward Webster" . Encyclopedia Americana.
- Chisholm, Hugh, ed. (1911). "Bemis, Edward Webster" . Encyclopædia Britannica (11th ed.). Cambridge University Press.
- "The Encyclopedia of Cleveland History: Edward Webster Bemis".
