= Boston University College of Arts and Sciences =

School of Boston University

Coordinates: 42.3485°N 71.1007°W

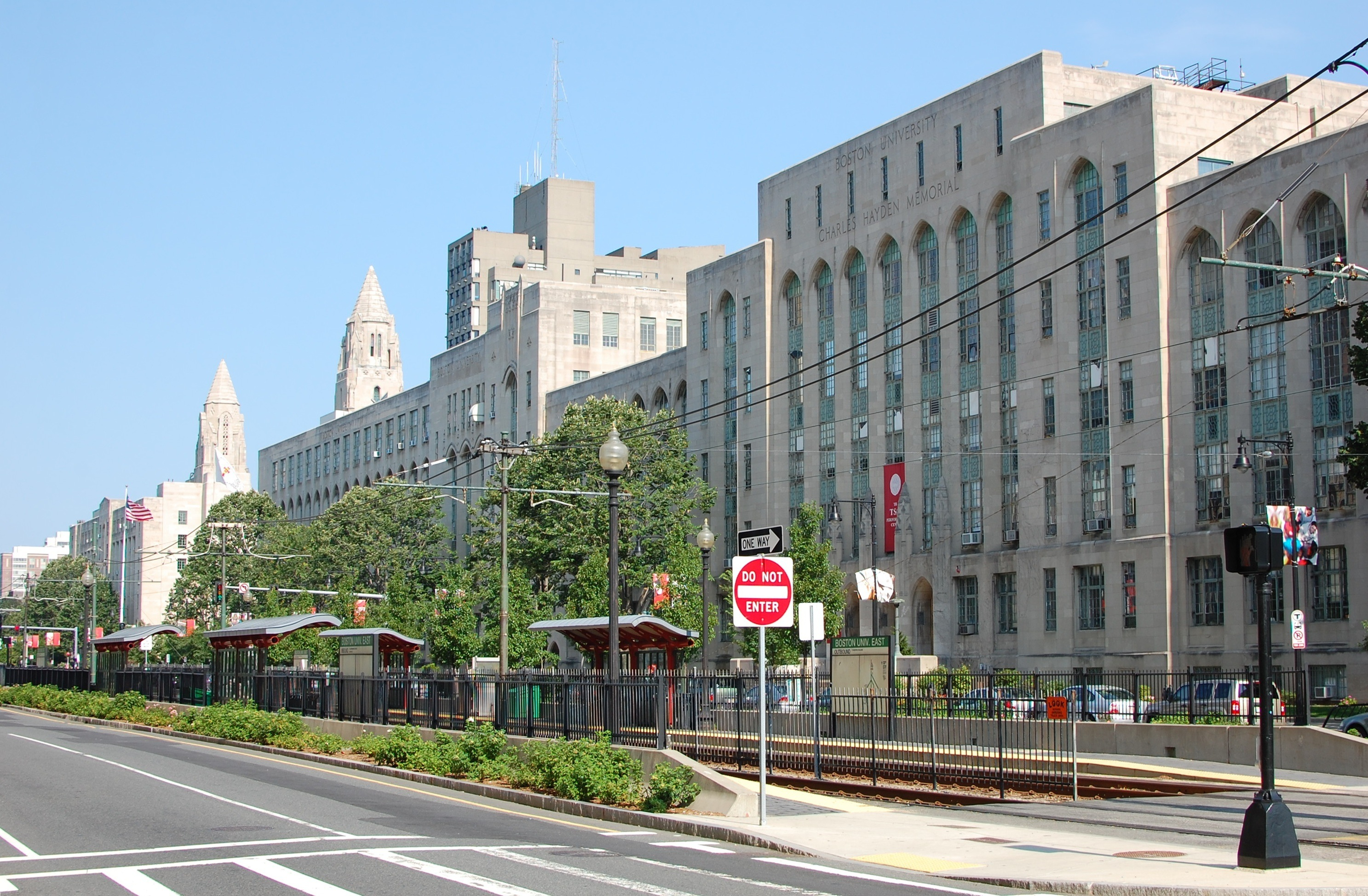
- The College of Arts and Sciences Building
- Type: Private
- Established: 1873; 149 years ago
- Parent institution: Boston University
- Dean: Stan Sclaroff
- Students: 7,819
- Location: 725 Commonwealth Ave, Boston, Massachusetts, U.S., Boston, Massachusetts, U.S.
- Website: bu.edu/cas

The Boston University College of Arts and Sciences (CAS), which includes the Graduate School of Arts and Sciences (GRS), is the largest school at Boston University, offering Bachelor of Arts degrees in 25 departments and nearly 25 interdisciplinary programs, including those offered through the Pardee School of Global Studies. The departments and programs fall into four broad categories (natural science, social science, humanities, and math & computer science) and encompass over 3,500 courses and over 100 undergraduate majors and minors. Graduate students can earn a master's or Ph.D. in nearly 50 fields. More than 8,000 undergraduates and 2,000 graduate students attend the College of Arts & Sciences each year.

CAS was founded in 1873 as the College of Liberal Arts, with Rev. John W. Lindsay serving as the first dean, and was renamed to the College of Arts & Sciences in 1996. The School of All Sciences, which would later become the Graduate School of Arts & Sciences, opened a year later in 1874. Currently, CAS has over 100,000 living alumni and GRS has over 23,000.
