= NLRB v. Yeshiva University =

- Supreme Court of the United States

Argued October 10, 1979 Decided February 20, 1980
- Full case name: National Labor Relations Board v. Yeshiva University
- Citations: 444 U.S. 672 (more) 100 S. Ct. 856; 63 L. Ed. 2d 115

Case history
- Prior: 582 F.2d 686 (2d Cir. 1978); cert. granted, 440 U.S. 906 (1979).

Court membership
- Chief Justice Warren E. Burger Associate Justices William J. Brennan Jr. · Potter Stewart; Byron White · Thurgood Marshall; Harry Blackmun · Lewis F. Powell Jr. William Rehnquist · John P. Stevens

Case opinions
- Majority: Powell, joined by Burger, Stewart, Rehnquist, Stevens
- Dissent: Brennan, joined by White, Marshall, Blackmun

Laws applied
- National Labor Relations Act 1935

National Labor Relations Board v. Yeshiva University, 444 U.S. 672 (1980), is a US labor law case about the scope of labor rights in the United States.

== Facts ==
The Yeshiva University Faculty Association (a labor union) asked the National Labor Relations Board to be certified as the official bargaining agent for teaching and professorial staff at Yeshiva University. University management argued that the staff should not qualify as "employees" under the National Labor Relations Act of 1935 §2(11) as they had sufficient supervisory authority. The staff contended that, while they managed their teaching and curriculum, they did not have effective authority over managerial power.

== Judgment ==
A majority of the Supreme Court, 5 to 4, held that full-time university professors are excluded from collective bargaining rights, on the theory that they exercise "managerial" discretion in academic matters. Justice Lewis F. Powell Jr. delivered the majority opinion, which Chief Justice Warren Burger and Justices Potter Stewart, William Rehnquist, and John Paul Stevens joined.

Justice William J. Brennan Jr. dissented, joined by Justices Thurgood Marshall, Byron White, and Henry Blackmun. Brennan wrote that management was actually in the hands of university administration, not professors.

the Board reached the correct result in determining that Yeshiva's full-time faculty is covered under the NLRA. The Court does not dispute that the faculty members are "professional employees" for the purposes of collective bargaining under § 2(12), but nevertheless finds them excluded from coverage under the implied exclusion for managerial employees."2 The Court explains that "[t]he controlling consideration in this case is that the faculty of Yeshiva University exercise authority which in any other context unquestionably would be managerial." Ante, at 686. But the academic community is simply not "any other context." The Court purports to recognize that there are fundamental differences between the authority structures of the typical industrial and academic institutions which preclude the blind transplanting of principles developed in one arena onto the other; yet it nevertheless ignores those very differences in concluding that Yeshiva's faculty is excluded from the Act's coverage.

As reflected in the legislative history of the Taft-Hartley Amendments of 1947, the concern behind the exclusion of supervisors under § 2(11) of the Act is twofold. On the one hand, Congress sought to protect the rank-and-file employees from being unduly influenced in their selection of leaders by the presence of management representatives in their union. "If supervisors were members of and active in the union which represented the employees they supervised it could be possible for the supervisors to obtain and retain positions of power in the union by reason of their authority over their fellow union members while working on the job." NLRB v. Metropolitan Life Ins. Co., [1968] USCA2 573; 405 F.2d 1169, 1178 (CA2 1968). In addition, Congress wanted to ensure that employers would not be deprived of the undivided loyalty of their supervisory foremen. Congress was concerned that if supervisors were allowed to affiliate with labor organizations that represented the rank and file, they might become accountable to the workers, thus interfering with the supervisors' ability to discipline and control the employees in the interest of the employer.

Identical considerations underlie the exclusion of managerial employees. See ante, at 682. Although a variety of verbal formulations have received judicial approval over the years, see Retail Clerks International Assn. v. NLRB, 125 U.S.App.D.C. 63, 65-66, 366 F.2d 642, 644-645 (1966), this Court has recently sanctioned a definition of "managerial employee" that comprises those who " 'formulate and effectuate management policies by expressing and making operative the decisions of their employer.' " See NLRB v. Bell Aerospace Co., 416 U.S., at 288, 94 S.Ct. at 1768. The touchstone of managerial status is thus an alliance with management, and the pivotal inquiry is whether the employee in performing his duties represents his own interests or those of his employer. If his actions are undertaken for the purpose of implementing the employer's policies, then he is accountable to management and may be subject to conflicting loyalties. But if the employee is acting only on his own behalf and in his own interest, he is covered under the Act and is entitled to the benefits of collective bargaining.

After examining the voluminous record in this case, the Board determined that the faculty at Yeshiva exercised its decisionmaking authority in its own interest rather than "in the interest of the employer." 221 N.L.R.B. 1053, 1054 (1975). The Court, in contrast, can perceive "no justification for this distinction" and concludes that the faculty's interests "cannot be separated from those of the institution." Ante, at 688. But the Court's vision is clouded by its failure fully to discern and comprehend the nature of the faculty's role in university governance.

Unlike the purely hierarchical decisionmaking structure that prevails in the typical industrial organization, the bureaucratic foundation of most "mature" universities is characterized by dual authority systems. The primary decisional network is hierarchical in nature: Authority is lodged in the administration, and a formal chain of command runs from a lay governing board down through university officers to individual faculty members and students. At the same time, there exists a parallel professional network, in which formal mechanisms have been created to bring the expertise of the faculty into the decisionmaking process. See J. Baldridge, Power and Conflict in the University 114 (1971); Finkin, The NLRB in Higher Education, 5 U.Toledo L.Rev. 608, 614-618 (1974).

What the Board realized—and what the Court fails to apprehend is that whatever influence the faculty wields in university decisionmaking is attributable solely to its collective expertise as professional educators, and not to any managerial or supervisory prerogatives....

== See also ==
- United States labor law
