= List of The Sims video games =

This is a list of The Sims games and their expansion packs, usually developed by Maxis and published by Electronic Arts.

== The Sims era ==
=== Base game ===
- The Sims (2000, Microsoft Windows, Classic Mac OS, macOS; 2003, Linux)

==== Expansion packs ====
- The Sims: Livin' Large (2000; The Sims: Livin' It Up in the UK, Ireland and Portugal)
- The Sims: House Party (2001)
- The Sims: Hot Date (2001, Microsoft Windows; 2002, macOS)
- The Sims: Vacation (2002; The Sims: On Holiday in the UK, Ireland, China and Portugal)
- The Sims: Unleashed (2002, Microsoft Windows; 2003, macOS)
- The Sims: Superstar (2003)
- The Sims: Makin' Magic (2003, Microsoft Windows; 2004, macOS)

==== Compilation packs ====
- The Sims Collector's Edition (2001; includes Livin' it Up; Europe only)
- The Sims Party Pack (2001; includes House Party; Europe only)
- The Sims Deluxe Edition (2002; includes Livin' Large, The Sims Creator and exclusive items)
- The Sims Double Deluxe (2003; includes content from Deluxe Edition, House Party and bonus items)
- The Sims Mega Deluxe (2004; includes content from Double Deluxe and Hot Date; The Sims Party Pack on macOS; Windows version exclusive to North America)
- The Sims Triple Deluxe (2004; includes content from Double Deluxe and On Holiday; UK and Ireland only)
- The Sims Full House (2004; includes all expansion packs; Australia, New Zealand and South Africa)
- The Sims Complete Collection (2005; includes content from Double Deluxe and all expansion packs)
- The Sims Expansion Collection (2005; released in three volumes, all North America only)
  - The Sims: Expansion Collection Volume One (includes Unleashed and House Party)
  - The Sims: Expansion Collection Volume Two (includes Hot Date and Makin' Magic)
  - The Sims: Expansion Collection Volume Three (includes Vacation and Superstar)
- The Sims Expansion Three-Pack (2005; released in two volumes)
  - The Sims: Expansion Three-Pack Volume 1 (includes Unleashed, Superstar and House Party)
  - The Sims: Expansion Three-Pack Volume 2 (includes Hot Date, Vacation and Makin' Magic)
- The Sims Legacy Collection (2025 re-release of Complete Collection; includes all expansion packs and bonus content from Deluxe Edition and Double Deluxe, as well as a bonus Throwback Fit Kit for The Sims 4)

=== Console edition ===
- The Sims (2003; PlayStation 2, GameCube, Xbox)

=== Spin-offs ===
- SimsVille (cancelled; Microsoft Windows)
- The Sims Online (2002; Microsoft Windows)
- The Sims Bustin' Out (2003, PlayStation 2, GameCube, Xbox, Game Boy Advance; 2004, N-Gage)
- The Urbz: Sims in the City (2004; GameCube, PlayStation 2, Xbox, Game Boy Advance, Nintendo DS)

== The Sims 2 era ==
=== Base game ===
- The Sims 2 (2004, Microsoft Windows; 2005, macOS)

==== Expansion packs ====
- The Sims 2: University (2005)
- The Sims 2: Nightlife (2005, Microsoft Windows; 2006, macOS)
- The Sims 2: Open for Business (2006)
- The Sims 2: Pets (2006)
- The Sims 2: Seasons (2007)
- The Sims 2: Bon Voyage (2007)
- The Sims 2: FreeTime (2008)
- The Sims 2: Apartment Life (2008)

==== Stuff packs ====
- The Sims 2: Holiday Party Pack (2005; The Sims 2: Christmas Party Pack in the UK and Ireland)
- The Sims 2: Family Fun Stuff (2006, Microsoft Windows; 2007, macOS)
- The Sims 2: Glamour Life Stuff (2006, Microsoft Windows; 2007, macOS)
- The Sims 2: Happy Holiday Stuff (2006, Microsoft Windows; 2007, macOS; The Sims 2: Festive Holiday Stuff in the UK and Ireland)
- The Sims 2: Celebration! Stuff (2007)
- The Sims 2: H&M Fashion Stuff (2007)
- The Sims 2: Teen Style Stuff (2007)
- The Sims 2: Kitchen & Bath Interior Design Stuff (2008)
- The Sims 2: IKEA Home Stuff (2008)
- The Sims 2: Mansion & Garden Stuff (2008)

==== Editions and compilation packs ====
- The Sims 2 Special DVD Edition (2004; includes the game on DVD rather than CD and a bonus DVD with exclusive content)
- The Sims 2 Holiday Edition (2005; includes Holiday Party Pack; North America only)
- The Sims 2 Holiday Edition (2006; includes Happy Holiday Stuff, as well as content from the previous Holiday Edition in North America only)
- The Sims 2 Deluxe (2007; includes Nightlife and a new bonus DVD)
- The Sims 2 Double Deluxe (2008; includes content from Deluxe and Celebration! Stuff)
- The Sims 2 University Life Collection (2009; includes University, IKEA Home Stuff and Teen Style Stuff)
- The Sims 2 Best of Business Collection (2009; includes Open for Business, H&M Fashion Stuff and Kitchen & Bath Interior Design Stuff)
- The Sims 2 Fun with Pets Collection (2010; includes Pets, Family Fun Stuff and Mansion & Garden Stuff)
- The Sims 2 Ultimate Collection (2014; includes all DLC; exclusively available through Origin via free codes from EA until 2018)
- The Sims 2 Super Collection (2014; includes all expansion packs up to Bon Voyage and all stuff packs up to Happy Holiday Stuff; macOS only)
- The Sims 2 Legacy Collection (2025 re-release of Ultimate Collection; includes all DLC except IKEA Home Stuff, as well as a bonus Grunge Revival Kit for The Sims 4)

=== Console and mobile editions ===
- The Sims 2 (2005; GameCube, PlayStation 2, Xbox, Game Boy Advance, Nintendo DS, PlayStation Portable, Java ME)
  - The Sims 2 (Game Boy Advance)
  - The Sims 2 (Nintendo DS)
- The Sims 2: Pets (2006, GameCube, PlayStation 2, Game Boy Advance, Nintendo DS, PlayStation Portable; 2007, Wii)
- The Sims 2: Castaway (2007, Wii, PlayStation 2, PlayStation Portable, Nintendo DS; 2008, Mobile; 2009, Windows Phone, BlackBerry)
- The Sims 2: Apartment Pets (2008; Nintendo DS)
- The Sims DJ (2008; iPod)
- The Sims Bowling (2008; iPod)
- The Sims Pool (2008; iPod)

=== The Sims Stories ===
- The Sims Life Stories (2007; Microsoft Windows, macOS)
- The Sims Pet Stories (2007; Microsoft Windows, macOS)
- The Sims Castaway Stories (2008; Microsoft Windows, macOS)

== MySims ==
- MySims (2007, Nintendo DS, Wii; 2008, Microsoft Windows, Mobile; 2009, BlackBerry)
- MySims Kingdom (2008; Wii, Nintendo DS)
- MySims Party (2009; Wii, Nintendo DS)
- MySims Racing (2009; Wii, Nintendo DS)
- MySims Agents (2009; Wii, Nintendo DS)
- MySims SkyHeroes (2010; Wii, Nintendo DS, PlayStation 3, Xbox 360)

=== Compilation ===
- MySims: Cozy Bundle (2024, Nintendo Switch; 2025, Microsoft Windows; includes MySims and MySims Kingdom)

== The Sims 3 era ==
=== Base game ===
- The Sims 3 (2009; Microsoft Windows, macOS)

==== Expansion packs ====
- The Sims 3: World Adventures (2009)
- The Sims 3: Ambitions (2010)
- The Sims 3: Late Night (2010)
- The Sims 3: Generations (2011)
- The Sims 3: Pets (2011)
- The Sims 3: Showtime (2012)
- The Sims 3: Supernatural (2012)
- The Sims 3: Seasons (2012)
- The Sims 3: University Life (2013)
- The Sims 3: Island Paradise (2013)
- The Sims 3: Into the Future (2013)

==== Stuff packs ====
- The Sims 3: High-End Loft Stuff (2010)
- The Sims 3: Fast Lane Stuff (2010)
- The Sims 3: Outdoor Living Stuff (2011)
- The Sims 3: Town Life Stuff (2011)
- The Sims 3: Master Suite Stuff (2012)
- The Sims 3: Katy Perry's Sweet Treats (2012)
- The Sims 3: Diesel Stuff (2012)
- The Sims 3: 70s, 80s, & 90s Stuff (2013)
- The Sims 3: Movie Stuff (2013)

==== Store DLC worlds ====
- The Sims 3: Riverview (2009)
- The Sims 3: Barnacle Bay (2010)
- The Sims 3: Hidden Springs (2011)
- The Sims 3: Lunar Lakes (2012)
- The Sims 3: Lucky Palms (2012)
- The Sims 3: Sunlit Tides (2012)
- The Sims 3: Monte Vista (2012)
- The Sims 3: Aurora Skies (2013)
- The Sims 3: Dragon Valley (2013)
- The Sims 3: Midnight Hollow (2013)
- The Sims 3: Roaring Heights (2013)

==== Compilation packs ====
- The Sims 3 Collector's Edition (2009; includes an exclusive in-game car and a USB flash drive in a plumbob-shaped case)
- The Sims 3 Holiday Collector's Edition (2009; includes content from the regular Collector's Edition, Christmas-themed in-game music and items and a Christmas-themed desktop wallpaper)
- The Sims 3 Commemorative Edition (2010; includes in-game items, a book, a poster and an art book)
- The Sims 3 Deluxe (2010; includes Ambitions)
- The Sims 3 Starter Pack (2013; includes Late Night, High End Loft Stuff and additional downloadable content)

=== Console and handheld editions ===
- The Sims 3 (2009; iOS, Android, Bada, Symbian, BlackBerry Curve, Windows Phone, N-Gage 2.0)
- The Sims 3 (2010, Nintendo DS, PlayStation 3, Xbox 360, Wii; 2011, Nintendo 3DS)
- The Sims 3: World Adventures (2009; iOS, Mobile)
- The Sims 3: Ambitions (2010; iOS, Mobile)
- The Sims 3: Pets (2011; Xbox 360, PlayStation 3, Nintendo 3DS)
- The Sims 3: Supernatural (2012; Blackberry Curve)

=== The Sims Medieval ===
- The Sims Medieval (2011; Microsoft Windows, macOS)
  - The Sims Medieval: Pirates and Nobles (2011; expansion pack)
  - The Sims Medieval Deluxe Edition (2011; compilation of the base game and Pirates and Nobles)
- The Sims Medieval (2011, iOS; 2013, Windows Phone)

=== The Sims Social ===
- The Sims Social (2011; Facebook)

== The Sims FreePlay ==
- The Sims FreePlay (2011, iOS; 2012, Android; 2013, Windows Phone, BlackBerry 10)

== The Sims 4 ==
=== Base game ===
- The Sims 4 (2014, Microsoft Windows; 2015, macOS; 2017, PlayStation 4, Xbox One)

==== Expansion packs ====
- The Sims 4: Get to Work (PC, 2015; consoles, 2018)
- The Sims 4: Get Together (PC, 2015; consoles, 2018)
- The Sims 4: City Living (PC, 2016; consoles, 2017)
- The Sims 4: Cats & Dogs (PC, 2017; consoles, 2018)
- The Sims 4: Seasons (2018)
- The Sims 4: Get Famous (PC, 2018; consoles, 2019)
- The Sims 4: Island Living (2019)
- The Sims 4: Discover University (2019)
- The Sims 4: Eco Lifestyle (2020)
- The Sims 4: Snowy Escape (2020)
- The Sims 4: Cottage Living (2021)
- The Sims 4: High School Years (2022)
- The Sims 4: Growing Together (2023)
- The Sims 4: Horse Ranch (2023)
- The Sims 4: For Rent (2023)
- The Sims 4: Lovestruck (2024)
- The Sims 4: Life & Death (2024)
- The Sims 4: Businesses & Hobbies (2025)
- The Sims 4: Enchanted by Nature (2025)
- The Sims 4: Adventure Awaits (2025)
- The Sims 4: Royalty & Legacy (2026)

==== Game packs ====
- The Sims 4: Outdoor Retreat (PC, 2015; consoles, 2018)
- The Sims 4: Spa Day (PC, 2015; consoles, 2019)
- The Sims 4: Dine Out (PC, 2016; consoles, 2018)
- The Sims 4: Vampires (2017)
- The Sims 4: Parenthood (PC, 2017; consoles, 2018)
- The Sims 4: Jungle Adventure (2018)
- The Sims 4: StrangerVille (2019)
- The Sims 4: Realm of Magic (2019)
- The Sims 4: Star Wars: Journey to Batuu (2020)
- The Sims 4: Dream Home Decorator (2021)
- The Sims 4: My Wedding Stories (2022)
- The Sims 4: Werewolves (2022)

==== Stuff packs ====
- The Sims 4: Luxury Party Stuff (PC, 2015; consoles, 2017)
- The Sims 4: Perfect Patio Stuff (PC, 2015; consoles, 2017)
- The Sims 4: Cool Kitchen Stuff (PC, 2015; consoles, 2017)
- The Sims 4: Spooky Stuff (PC, 2015; consoles, 2018)
- The Sims 4: Movie Hangout Stuff (PC, 2016; consoles, 2019)
- The Sims 4: Romantic Garden Stuff (PC, 2016; consoles, 2018)
- The Sims 4: Kids Room Stuff (PC, 2016; consoles, 2018)
- The Sims 4: Backyard Stuff (PC, 2016; consoles, 2018)
- The Sims 4: Vintage Glamour Stuff (PC, 2016; consoles, 2017)
- The Sims 4: Bowling Night Stuff (PC, 2017; consoles, 2019)
- The Sims 4: Fitness Stuff (PC, 2017; consoles, 2019)
- The Sims 4: Toddler Stuff (PC, 2017; consoles, 2018)
- The Sims 4: Laundry Day Stuff (2018)
- The Sims 4: My First Pet Stuff (PC, 2018; consoles, 2020)
- The Sims 4: Moschino Stuff (2019)
- The Sims 4: Tiny Living Stuff (2020)
- The Sims 4: Nifty Knitting Stuff (2020)
- The Sims 4: Paranormal Stuff (2021)
- The Sims 4: Home Chef Hustle Stuff (2023)
- The Sims 4: Crystal Creations Stuff (2024)

==== Kits ====
- The Sims 4: Throwback Fit Kit
- The Sims 4: Country Kitchen Kit
- The Sims 4: Bust the Dust Kit
- The Sims 4: Courtyard Oasis Kit
- The Sims 4: Industrial Loft Kit
- The Sims 4: Fashion Street Kit
- The Sims 4: Incheon Arrivals Kit
- The Sims 4: Blooming Rooms Kit
- The Sims 4: Modern Menswear Kit
- The Sims 4: Carnaval Streetwear Kit
- The Sims 4: Decor to the Max Kit
- The Sims 4: Moonlight Chic Kit
- The Sims 4: Little Campers Kit
- The Sims 4: First Fits Kit
- The Sims 4: Desert Luxe Kit
- The Sims 4: Pastel Pop Kit
- The Sims 4: Everyday Clutter Kit
- The Sims 4: Bathroom Clutter Kit
- The Sims 4: Simtimates Collection Kit
- The Sims 4: Greenhouse Haven Kit
- The Sims 4: Basement Treasures Kit
- The Sims 4: Book Nook Kit
- The Sims 4: Grunge Revival Kit
- The Sims 4: Poolside Splash Kit
- The Sims 4: Modern Luxe Kit
- The Sims 4: Castle Estate Kit
- The Sims 4: Goth Galore Kit
- The Sims 4: Urban Homage Kit
- The Sims 4: Party Essentials Kit
- The Sims 4: Riviera Retreat Kit
- The Sims 4: Cozy Bistro Kit
- The Sims 4: Storybook Nursery Kit
- The Sims 4: Artist Studio Kit
- The Sims 4: Sweet Slumber Party Kit
- The Sims 4: Cozy Kitsch Kit
- The Sims 4: Secret Sanctuary Kit
- The Sims 4: Comfy Gamer Kit
- The Sims 4: Casanova Cave Kit
- The Sims 4: Refined Living Room Kit
- The Sims 4: Business Chic Kit
- The Sims 4: Sweet Allure Kit
- The Sims 4: Sleek Bathroom Kit
- The Sims 4: Restoration Workshop Kit
- The Sims 4: Kitchen Clutter Kit
- The Sims 4: Golden Years Kit
- The Sims 4: Grange Mudroom Kit
- The Sims 4: Essential Glam Kit
- The Sims 4: Autumn Apparel Kit
- The Sims 4: Modern Retreat Kit
- The Sims 4: Garden to Table Kit
- The Sims 4: SpongeBob's House Kit
- The Sims 4: SpongeBob Kid's Room Kit
- The Sims 4: Prairie Dreams
- The Sims 4: Silver Screen Style Kit
- The Sims 4: Tea Time Solarium Kit
- The Sims 4: Wonderland Playroom Kit
- The Sims 4: Yard Charm Kit
- The Sims 4: Lady Bridgerton's Masquerade Ballroom Kit
- The Sims 4: Lady Bridgerton's Masquerade Ball Fashion Kit
- The Sims 4: Music Den Kit
- The Sims 4: Mean Girls Capsule Kit
- The Sims 4: Clueless Capsule Kit

==== Free pack ====
- The Sims 4: Holiday Celebration Pack

==== Editions ====
- The Sims 4: Limited Edition
- The Sims 4: Digital Deluxe
- The Sims 4: Premium Edition
- The Sims 4: Collector's Edition
- The Sims 4: Legacy Edition
- The Sims 4: EA Play Edition

=== The Sims Mobile ===
- The Sims Mobile (2017; iOS, Android)

== See also ==
- List of Sim video games
- List of Maxis games
