= The Sims 2: Bon Voyage =

Expansion pack for The Sims 2

- Developer: Maxis
- Publishers: Electronic Arts (PC); Aspyr Media (Mac)
- Platforms: Windows, Mac OS X
- Release: Windows: NA: September 4, 2007; EU: September 7, 2007; Mac OS X December 17, 2007
- Genre: Social simulation
- Mode: Single-player

The Sims 2: Bon Voyage is an expansion pack for the 2004 life simulation video game The Sims 2, developed by Maxis and published by Electronic Arts. The sixth expansion pack for the game, it was released September 4, 2007. Bon Voyage adds the ability to book in-game holiday travel to one of three pre-defined destinations, broadly themed around the Far East, Polynesia, and a generic mountainous region respectively. Each destination has its own unique culture, activities, and attractions. Other features of Bon Voyage include its expansion of the in-game inventory function, a number of new items and interactions, and its soundtrack, featuring Bob Marley's son Damian Marley.

Upon release, Bon Voyage received mixed reviews; it faced criticism for serious software bugs and incompatibility with existing game mods. The expansion pack's themes were reused for later expansions for The Sims 3 and The Sims 4. Bon Voyage's use of the SecuROM system of copy protection and digital rights management drew controversy, including lawsuits brought against its publisher Electronic Arts.

== Background and development ==
The Sims is a franchise of life simulation games developed by Maxis and published by Electronic Arts. It has sold over 200 million copies amongst all platforms and installments, making it one of the best-selling video game franchises of all time. The Sims 2, sequel to the original, was released on September 14, 2004. It expanded upon the original game's features, introducing elements such as an aspiration system based around short-term and long-term goals; expanded character and neighborhood customization; and the ability for Sims to raise families, age, and progress through generations.

All main entries in the series have had multiple expansion packs, which add further gameplay options. Rather than being relatively simple downloadable content, expansion packs for the first three games in the Sims series substantially expanded upon the base game's life simulation; Kieron Gillen, writing for Eurogamer in 2005, stated the first game's expansions "could have been expanded [...] into games of their own" and argued their complexity was a component in why The Sims had few competitors in its genre. Eight expansion packs were released for The Sims 2 between 2005 and 2008.

The Sims 2: Bon Voyage, the sixth expansion pack in the series, was announced in mid-2007. It was stylistically influenced by The Sims: Vacation, a similar expansion pack for the first game. Bon Voyage was developed alongside the thematically similar The Sims Castaway Stories for PC and The Sims 2: Castaway for console. Both Castaway games are stand-alone entries in the series with semi-structured plots based around a shipwrecking, distinguishing them from the freeform expansion structure of Bon Voyage; senior developer Rod Humble stated that Bon Voyage was designed to let players "enjoy the tropics without having to starve to death". It was released for Windows on September 4, 2007, in North America and on September 7 in Europe, and on December 17, 2007, for Mac OS X, becoming the final expansion pack for The Sims 2 to be released for Mac. Bon Voyage was the first expansion pack for the game to use the SecuROM copy protection and digital rights management system, use of which was retained for the following entries The Sims 2: FreeTime and The Sims 2: Apartment Life.

== Gameplay ==
The Pagoda in the Shadows, a "secret lot" in a vacation area

The Sims 2: Bon Voyage revolves around vacationing. Sims are able to book holiday travel to one of three pre-defined destinations, broadly themed around the Far East, Polynesia, and a generic "mountain" region respectively. Bon Voyage allows Sims from multiple households to travel together, changing the structure of previous games where only one household could be played at a time. When a Sim books a trip, the player can invite along Sims from other households. These guests cannot be directly controlled by the player, but their profiles are viewable, a structure similar to that used for pets in The Sims 2: Pets. While Sims are travelling, time does not pass as in other areas of the game; Sims do not age or need to attend work or school.

Within the sandbox gameplay of Bon Voyage, opportunities exist to collect souvenirs, learn about the native culture from locals, and engage in recreational activities. Different areas have differently-themed opportunities; for instance, beach locations present opportunities such as building sandcastles, swimming, and exploring abandoned pirate ships. As players pursue these activities, they build points towards a hidden "vacation score" that tracks Sims' enjoyment of their holiday. Points are gained for things such as collecting mementos, befriending other Sims, and discovering secret areas, while they can be lost after more inauspicious events like watching another Sim die. When Sims return home, these points are tallied; high scores allow the player to select temporary benefits for each Sim in a party, such as improved job performance or a faster rate of learning skills. Less successful vacations can have the opposite effect, decreasing a Sim's learning rate or even impacting their personality.

New forms of non-playable Sims are introduced; "locals" are natives of vacation towns, while "tourists" are other Sims on holiday. These Sims can be interacted with like other non-playable Sims, including having the option to move them in or marry them. However, they do not appear in normal neighborhoods and cannot be invited on parties or dates there. Other new non-player characters (NPCs) are more limited. Several of the items introduced in Bon Voyage spawn "object NPCs", a type of Sim with limited abilities and interactions linked to the presence of a particular object. These NPCs are linked to the functioning of vacation areas; for instance, bellhops are spawned by hotel desks and check Sims in and out of hotels. Some NPCs can be used to unlock special interactions, such as teleportation, the "dragon legend" that Sims can tell one another, the option to sing sea shanties, and the ability to own and manipulate voodoo dolls. Bon Voyage also adds the Unsavory Charlatan, a cartoon villain-style thief who pickpockets Sims. Should a Sim lose money to the Unsavory Charlatan, they gain the option to fight him, which may regain their funds—or allow him to steal more.

Bon Voyage incorporates a number of miscellaneous features. It allows players to purchase vacation homes, marking the first time in the series that Sims can own multiple home lots; these allow Sims to holiday without paying for hotels. Bon Voyage expands the inventory function to give all Sims digital cameras by default, allowing the player to take in-game photographs and direct Sims to stand in specific poses. The expansion also adds jewellery, allowing Sims to have accessories separate from their clothing, such as necklaces or body piercings. A number of new interactions are added; Sims can learn culturally specific greetings from locals, discuss their previous trips with other Sims, and talk about souvenirs they collected. Some new items, such as tents, saunas, and hammocks, allow specific interactions; for instance, any of those three items is a potential woohoo location.

Following the introduction of supernatural Sims in prior expansion packs for The Sims 2, Bon Voyage allows the player to find Bigfoot. By default, Bigfoot lives in the mountain vacation area; should a Sim build a friendship with him, he can be invited to move in with them, becoming a playable character. Bigfoot possess a number of unique characteristics. Children and dogs have substantial relationship bonuses with him, but cats have equally sizable maluses. He has maximum points in all skills and the highest level of all talent badges, granting him expertise in, amongst other things, gardening, flower arranging, and cosmetology. Bigfoot has many but not all of the interactions of a normal Sim; he can be turned into a vampire or zombie but not a werewolf or PlantSim, and can be befriended but not romanced.

== Soundtrack ==
Background music for The Sims 2: Bon Voyage was composed by Silas Hite, who also composed for The Sims 2: Castaway. Throughout the series, in-game diegetic music is provided by musicians making Simlish covers of their real-world songs. For Bon Voyage, Bob Marley's son Damian Marley covered his Grammy-winning "Welcome to Jamrock"; The National referred to Damian Marley's soundtrack appearance as "the true sign of fame".

== Reception and legacy ==
The Sims 2: Bon Voyage received mixed reviews. Its aggregate Metascore of 74, corresponding to a "mixed or average" reception, is tied for lowest amongst Sims 2 expansion packs. (Note: Scores across all entries range from 74 for Bon Voyage and The Sims 2: FreeTime to 81 for The Sims 2: University. The Sims 2: Apartment Life received a Metascore of 75, corresponding to "generally favorable reviews". Nightlife and Pets both scored 76, while Open for Business and Seasons both scored 78.) On release, the expansion had serious software bugs and was incompatible with existing game mods. The first entry in the series to use the SecuROM system of copy protection and digital rights management, it netted controversy, including legal action. Nonetheless, it was commercially successful, becoming the eighth-highest-selling PC game of 2007.

=== Reviews ===
Contemporary reviews for Bon Voyage ranged from the positive to the position, espoused by Steve Hogarty of PC Zone, that it was "as fun as malaria". Reviewers as a whole found the expansion added relatively little to the game; J. Habib at IGN found "nothing here that will convert" people previously uninterested in the series, while Andrew Park at GameSpot, though recommending it to "obsessive" fans, felt "casual Sims 2 fans should enjoy just getting out of the house and taking a holiday".

Bon Voyage had a significant number of software bugs on release, which multiple reviewers felt hampered the expansion pack's potential. Mahamari Tsukitaka at Game Chronicles called attention to extreme lag, mentioning that loading times were markedly longer after installing Bon Voyage and that the game as a whole would freeze for periods up to half a minute long. Michael Lafferty's review for GameZone focused primarily on Bon Voyage's performance issues. He drew particular attention to its incompatibility with mods and custom content for previous expansion packs, sometimes overwriting mod folders entirely. The open-ended format of The Sims means fan-made add-ons play a particularly important role in gameplay; Lafferty reported some players lost entire folders with up to twenty gigabytes of custom content. (Note: Typical desktop computer storage in 2007 was 30–100 gigabytes.) He made note of the fact he uninstalled the expansion from his personal machine after playtesting for the review, as he found losing his mods too serious an issue to make up for the expansion's positives. Lafferty also criticised Bon Voyage's glitches, such as waiters disappearing while carrying food to tables and Sims getting trapped when leaving lots.

Nonetheless, reviewers felt Bon Voyage had potential; Lafferty believed it would be a "terrific expansion" were the bugs fixed. Windy Ross at GameRevolution praised the expansion pack as a holiday where "all the lifeguards are nice, and there is not a stingray in sight", though derided the large sums of in-game currency it took to purchase anything in vacation areas. Habib commended Bon Voyage for its focus on family dynamics, which he felt were neglected by previous expansion packs. He praised the opportunities it presented for players to strengthen familial bonds between Sims and the ability to take holidays without interfering with things like work or school, but criticised the fact such travel had limited impacts on Sims' home lives.

The theme of leisure travel was revisited in later entries in the series. The Sims 3 took inspiration from Bon Voyage with its expansion packs World Adventures and Island Paradise. Multiple releases for The Sims 4 have drawn parallels to Bon Voyage, in particular the expansion packs Island Living and Snowy Escape and the game packs (a smaller-scale version of expansion packs) Jungle Adventure and Outdoor Retreat. In a 2022 retrospective of Sims 2 expansion packs, Gabrielle Castania ranked Bon Voyage in last place.

=== Digital rights management controversy ===
Bon Voyage made use of the SecuROM copy protection and digital rights management (DRM) system. It was the first expansion pack for The Sims 2 to use SecuROM, which was used on many releases by its publisher EA Games in the late 2000s. SecuROM is a disc-based DRM scheme; when a user installs a disc using the system, SecuROM simultaneously installs itself on the computer's operating system's kernel, its central component which controls the rest of the system, with little or no warning. SecuROM places a hard limit on the number of times a user can "activate" software which uses it, apparently to prevent them from copying the disc for software piracy purposes, and surveils computers on which it is installed to determine whether the user has made any updates or installed an emulator. If such changes are made, it is able to force the user to re-activate the "protected" software.

The inclusion of SecuROM in Bon Voyage, alongside contemporary EA releases such as Spore, drew controversy. Players and commentators argued that the system was "draconian", unduly restricting the freedom of people who legally purchased games. Legal discourse around SecuROM posited its method of operation was similar to spyware or to rootkits, a type of software that enables an unauthorized user to gain control of a computer system. People who installed programs which used SecuROM reported issues such as optical disc drives on their computers no longer functioning, programs being misidentified as emulators and forcibly disabled, and firewalls being modified or disabled.

In October 2008, a woman who purchased Bon Voyage took out a class action lawsuit against EA Games over SecuROM. She reported she had purchased the game the previous September and soon after found her PC was unable to recognize her CD backups, USB flash drives, or iPod. After discovering that many players reported similar issues and ascribed them to SecuROM, she sued EA, accusing the company of engaging in "fraudulent business practices" and "immoral, unethical, oppressive, [and] unscrupulous" conduct. It was one of three lawsuits brought against EA over SecuROM in September and October 2008; a fourth was filed that November.

EA reached a settlement over bundling SecuROM with games in 2010. The Sims 3, released in 2009, did not use the system; the series' senior producer Rod Humble cited player opposition to "overly invasive" DRM. SecuROM was ultimately rendered obsolete following the release of Windows 10. In 2016, EA released workarounds for its games which used the system, including multiple Sims 2 releases.

== See also ==
- The Sims: Vacation
- The Sims 3 expansion packs § World Adventures
- The Sims 3 expansion packs § Island Paradise
- The Sims 4 expansion packs § Island Living
- The Sims 4 expansion packs § Snowy Escape
- The Sims 4 game packs § Outdoor Retreat
- The Sims 4 game packs § Jungle Adventure
