= The Sims 2: FreeTime =

Expansion pack for The Sims 2

- Developer: Maxis
- Publisher: Electronic Arts
- Platform: Microsoft Windows
- Release: February 26, 2008

The Sims 2: FreeTime is an expansion pack for the 2004 life simulation video game The Sims 2, developed by Maxis and published by Electronic Arts. The seventh expansion pack for the game, it was released February 26, 2008. The expansion pack introduces hobbies as a new feature for Sims to pursue; Sims can pursue ten possible hobbies and gain enthusiasm and benefits as they advance in them. The expansion pack also revamps the aspiration system, a system introduced in the base game that influences Sims' long- and short-term goals.

FreeTime received mixed reviews from critics, who disagreed on the expansion's impact on the game. Some praised its new hobbies and revamped aspiration system as adding complexity and depth to The Sims 2, while others felt they were underdeveloped and not well-integrated with existing gameplay goals. Reviewers also criticised the game's graphics and interface as aging and outdated compared to contemporary releases. The expansion pack was commercially successful, ranking amongst the top-selling PC games in the United States in 2008. In the years following its release, FreeTime has been favorably compared to releases for later games.

== Background and development ==
The Sims is a franchise of life simulation games developed by Maxis and published by Electronic Arts. It has sold over 200 million copies amongst all platforms and installments, making it one of the best-selling video game franchises of all time. The Sims 2, sequel to the original, was released on September 14, 2004. It expanded upon the original game's features, introducing elements such as an aspiration system based around short-term and long-term goals; expanded character and neighborhood customization; and the ability for Sims to raise families, age, and progress through generations.

All main entries in the series have had multiple expansion packs, which add further gameplay options. Rather than being relatively simple downloadable content, expansion packs for the first three games in the Sims series substantially expanded upon the base game's life simulation; Kieron Gillen, writing for Eurogamer in 2005, stated the first game's expansions "could have been expanded [...] into games of their own" and argued their complexity was a component in why The Sims had few competitors in its genre. Eight expansion packs were released for The Sims 2 between 2005 and 2008.

The Sims 2: FreeTime, the game's seventh expansion pack, was announced on January 16, 2008. It was designed alongside The Sims 3, the next main entry in the series. At the time, there were no more Sims 2 releases planned for 2008, though the game's final expansion pack The Sims 2: Apartment Life was ultimately released that August. According to an interview with the expansion's developers, FreeTime was intended to synthesize with the base game in its gameplay, unlike the more independent stand-alone features introduced by expansions such as The Sims 2: University and The Sims 2: Open for Business. FreeTime was released for PC on February 26, 2008 and was the first expansion pack for The Sims 2 not to be released for macOS.

== Gameplay ==
The premise of The Sims 2: FreeTime is the addition of hobbies to the game. Prior to the expansion pack's release, gameplay of The Sims 2 was primarily oriented around increasing skills and relationship meters in order to advance milestones, such as promoting a Sim to the highest level of a career. FreeTime adds ten possible hobbies for Sims to advance in, adding another dimension of gameplay. These hobbies can be purely avocational, or they can intertwine with existing systems; some hobbies can be used to advance skill building (such as the Tinkering hobby advancing the Mechanical skill), while some can be used to earn money.

The possible hobbies—Arts & Crafts, Cuisine, Film & Literature, Fitness, Games, Music & Dance, Nature, Science, Sports, and Tinkering—are tracked using a ten-level "enthusiasm" system. Sims gain enthusiasm in a hobby as they pursue it, but lose enthusiasm if they neglect it. As Sims build enthusiasm in a hobby, they gain options such as the ability to talk about it with other Sims, to instruct Sims in it, and to blog about their hobbies. Individual hobbies offer specific bonuses; for instance, Sims interested in cuisine can make cheese platters, those interested in fitness can go jogging, and those interested in science can search for UFOs. These abilities can allow Sims to gain skills, earn money, or fulfill their needs more easily. Sims who achieve high-level enthusiasm in a hobby can also join dedicated clubs, which allow them to socialize with Sims who share their interests, and upon reaching the tenth level of a hobby receive a commemorative plaque.

FreeTime revamps the base game's aspiration system. Sims' accomplishments are measured through a system known as aspiration, which determines their long-term goals and short-term desires. A Sim has one of several possible aspirations (Knowledge, Family, Fortune, Romance, or Popularity in the base game; The Sims 2: Nightlife adds Pleasure and Grilled Cheese) that affect their wants, fears, and lifetime wants. As wants and fears are fulfilled, they gain and lose aspiration points on a scale from red (lowest) to platinum (highest). FreeTime adds a Lifetime Aspiration meter alongside the short-term system impacted by immediate wants and fears. Sims gain lifetime aspiration points as they achieve milestones, such as graduating school or university, woohooing for the first time, giving birth to or adopting a child, and reaching the highest level of a career. Should a Sim achieve the highest possible lifetime aspiration, they gain "permanent platinum mood", placing them in a good mood for the rest of their lives.

As well as the lifetime aspiration system, FreeTime adds secondary aspirations and aspiration rewards. Secondary aspirations allow Sims to have the wants, fears, and benefits of another aspiration alongside their primary one. The "hidden" Grilled Cheese expansion, which makes Sims fascinated with grilled cheese sandwiches, was introduced in Nightlife as an aspiration only accessible through interacting with a specific item; FreeTime makes it accessible as a secondary aspiration to all players. Players can spend a Sim's lifetime aspiration points to grant them particular bonuses known as lifetime aspiration rewards. Some of these rewards are available to all Sims, such as slower motive decay or work performance benefits. Others are specific to particular aspirations; for instance, Family Sims can learn a soup recipe that cures illnesses, Grilled Cheese Sims can conjure grilled cheese sandwiches from nowhere, and Knowledge Sims can summon aliens. Lifetime aspiration rewards are a four-tiered system; Sims can gain all rewards from their primary aspiration and the first three from their secondary aspiration.

FreeTime adds five new career tracks to the game: Entertainment, Dance, Architecture, Intelligence, and Oceanography. It is the third and last expansion pack to add new careers for Sims, following The Sims 2: University and The Sims 2: Seasons. It adds a large number of new objects and functionalities; as well as over 100 objects added specifically in the expansion pack, it expands the range of interactions available with many pre-existing items. For instance, the novel-writing system is revamped to let Sims write particular genres of novels and give players some control over their plot elements, and the painting easel is expanded to let Grilled Cheese Sims paint still life paintings of sandwiches. The expansion pack also adds a new in-game neighborhood, Desiderata Valley, alongside the three pre-made neighborhoods in the base game. It was the second expansion to add a new base neighborhood, following Seasons.

== Soundtrack ==
Background music for The Sims 2: FreeTime was composed by Mark Mothersbaugh. As with previous expansion packs, diegetic music was provided by real-world musicians making Simlish covers of their previous releases. FreeTime's soundtrack comprised what Randolph Ramsay at GameSpot referred to as "an eclectic mix of international acts", including Natasha Bedingfield, Datarock, I'm from Barcelona, and They Might Be Giants. Bedingfield described the process of covering her song "Pocketful of Sunshine" in the game's constructed language Simlish as "a fun and delightful challenge".

== Reception and legacy ==
The Sims 2: FreeTime received mixed reviews. Its aggregate Metascore of 74, corresponding to a "mixed or average" reception, is tied for lowest amongst Sims 2 expansion packs. (Note: Scores across all entries range from 74 for FreeTime and The Sims 2: Bon Voyage to 81 for The Sims 2: University. The Sims 2: Apartment Life received a Metascore of 75, corresponding to "generally favorable reviews". Nightlife and Pets both scored 76, while Open for Business and Seasons both scored 78.) Contemporary reviewers felt that the expansion was filler and that the series was aging, with its graphics in particular lagging behind then-recent releases. FreeTime was commercially successful; it was the third highest-selling PC game in the US in The NPD Group's data for April 2008 and the ninth highest-selling in their data for that July. It closed the year as the twelfth-highest-selling PC game of 2008. In the years following its release, FreeTime has been positively compared to releases for The Sims 4.

=== Contemporary reception ===
Contemporary reviews for FreeTime disagreed on the expansion's impact on the game. Jon Habib at IGN felt it would "go down as one of the most significant expansions for The Sims 2" due to the impact of lifetime aspiration on gameplay, a position concurred with by Angelique Houtveen at Personal Computer Magazine. Other reviewers at publications such as GamesRadar, JeuxActu, and Gamer.nl felt the expansion was less significant, with a writer at Gamer.nl calling it "perhaps the most uninspired Sims expansion to date".

Critics focused primarily on the expansion pack's hobby system. Several reviewers, such as Troy Goodfellow at GamesRadar and Darren Allen at Eurogamer, felt that FreeTime added an element of complexity to "moulding the perfect sim"; Goodfellow drew attention in particular to the synergy of hobbies with job skills, such as a police officer Sim benefitting from interest in the Fitness hobby. Habib praised that Sims of all ages could pursue hobbies, when previous expansions had focused on opportunities for teen and adult Sims. Some reviewers criticised the lack of time in the game for Sims to advance in their hobbies; Gamer.nl in particular felt that they were underdeveloped and not well-synthesized with existing gameplay goals.

Writers who acknowledged FreeTime's changes to the aspiration system received them generally positively. A staff writer for the French gaming magazine Gamekult praised the aspiration rewards system, stating that the option to slow a Sim's motive decay made them no longer "prisoners of the shower, the bed or the toilet". The writer drew attention in particular to how this made it easier to manage large Sim families, as individual Sims were less dependent on fulfilling basic needs. Habib referred to lifetime aspiration as "the strongest change to the game", making particular note of the fact Sims with reduced energy decay could sleep less and accomplish more while awake.

FreeTime was released three and a half years after The Sims 2, and several reviewers felt the game was aging. Maxime Chao at JeuxActu expressed hope FreeTime would be the final expansion pack for the game, criticising the game's engine and interface as increasingly behind the times. Gamekult's writer similarly felt the game had "reached its limits", arguing there was no further for an eighth expansion pack to go and that the series was suffering from outdated graphics and artificial intelligence. Though Habib felt The Sims 2's graphics were "more than adequate" for the game's intended play and decried comparisons to more advanced contemporary releases, he nonetheless considered it "obvious" they were less sophisticated than those in then-recent games. He also criticsed the expansion's more cluttered interface compared to the base game, which he deemed an exemplar of interface design.

=== Later reception ===
Critical analysis of FreeTime in the years following its release has leaned positive; in a 2022 retrospective of Sims 2 expansion packs for TheGamer, Gabrielle Castania ranked FreeTime as the game's second best expansion behind The Sims 2: University. Nonetheless, writing for the same publication, Madeline Bliek felt its included neighborhood Desiderata Valley was "quite average" and poorly distinguished plotwise from other premade neighborhoods in the game, deeming it her least favorite of them.

As of 2023, no expansion pack for The Sims 4 has addressed exactly the same themes as FreeTime. Several analyses of The Sims 4 have given the specific example of FreeTime's hobby system as a missing element of the later game. Deven McClure, a senior writer at Screen Rant, compared FreeTime's more complex system to the simpler system of social clubs in The Sims 4: Get Together. She argued that a FreeTime-like system would add substantial depth to the game, including new ways to differentiate Sims from one another, for Sims to socialize, and for players to construct backstories for their characters. Steph Panecasio, an associate editor at CNET, referenced in particular that FreeTime allowed younger Sims to pursue hobbies and to attend after-school activities.

== See also ==
- The Sims 3 expansion packs § Ambitions
- The Sims 3 expansion packs § Generations
- The Sims 4 expansion packs § Get Together
