= The Sims 2: Apartment Life =

2008 video game expansion pack

- Developer: Maxis
- Publisher: Electronic Arts
- Platform: Microsoft Windows
- Release: PAL: August 22, 2008; NA: August 26, 2008

The Sims 2: Apartment Life is an expansion pack for the 2004 life simulation video game The Sims 2, developed by Maxis and published by Electronic Arts. The eighth and final expansion pack for the game, it was released in August 2008. Apartment Life is a broad-concept expansion pack introducing various features, including the option for Sims to live in apartments, a system of social class and personal reputation, a new pre-made neighborhood, and a magic system in which Sims can become witches and learn spells.

Apartment Life was inspired by player demand both for higher-density living options and for witchcraft, the latter of which had featured in the earlier installment The Sims: Makin' Magic. According to the developers, it was a complex expansion to create; the game had not previously allowed for multiple separate player-controlled families to live in the same area, and the designers researched real-world communities interested in magic while developing the game's magic system, influencing its portrayal.

Reception for Apartment Life was positive, with particular praise for its magic system and social opportunities. The expansion's release late in the game's lifecycle was a focus of many reviewers, who felt it would be overshadowed by the 2009 release of The Sims 3. The variety of concepts included, particularly the choice to introduce magic in an expansion pack not specifically themed around it, drew critical attention and remained the subject of note in the years following its release. Apartment Life's disparate themes have influenced several later expansion packs for The Sims 3 and The Sims 4.

== Background and development ==
The Sims is a franchise of life simulation games developed by Maxis and published by Electronic Arts. It has sold over 200 million copies amongst all platforms and installments, making it one of the best-selling video game franchises of all time. The Sims 2, sequel to the original, was released on September 14, 2004. It expanded upon the original game's features, introducing elements such as an aspiration system based around short-term and long-term goals; expanded character and neighborhood customization; and the ability for Sims to raise families, age, and progress through generations.

All main entries in the series have had multiple expansion packs, which add further gameplay options. Rather than being relatively simple downloadable content, expansion packs for the first three games in the Sims series substantially expanded upon the base game's life simulation; Kieron Gillen, writing for Eurogamer in 2005, stated the first game's expansions "could have been expanded [...] into games of their own" and argued their complexity was a component in why The Sims had few competitors in its genre. Eight expansion packs were released for The Sims 2 between 2005 and 2008.

The Sims 2: Apartment Life, the eighth and final expansion pack for the game, was announced in early June 2008. It was announced alongside The Sims 2: Apartment Pets, a similarly themed stand-alone game for the Nintendo DS. The series' senior producer Rod Humble stated that both releases were intended to "reflect an aspect of real life that players can relate to". The expansion pack's focus on high-density urban living was remarked upon by early analyses as a differentiation from the base game, which defaulted to a suburban setting. Apartment Life was demonstrated at an EA Games software showcase on August 14, 2008 and released on August 27, 2008.

According to an interview with the developers, the theme for Apartment Life was inspired by long-standing player demand for both apartments and the ability for Sims to cast magic spells. The technical process of making apartments work was reportedly difficult; the game had not previously allowed for multiple separate player-controlled families to live on the same lot, which one developer referred to as an "engineering feat". When developing the game's magical system, the designers researched real-world communities interested in magic. This research influenced how magic worked in the game; in response to a question from a player about whether the voodoo doll from The Sims 2: Bon Voyage would improve a Sim's magic capabilities, a developer replied that such objects were part of a "very different type of magic" to that the game was intended to represent.

== Gameplay ==
The Sims 2: Apartment Life is a broad-scope expansion pack. In its official guide, the lawyer and game strategy guide writer Greg Kramer introduced the expansion as focused on communities, positing that the title was chosen because apartments are "a microcosm of what it means to be part of a community" rather than because of any particular focus on apartments themselves. Apartment Life makes various changes to gameplay, including the addition of apartments, the introduction of a social class system, the ability for Sims to become witches, and a number of tweaks to how Sims handle self-care and social interaction. The expansion pack overhauls the system of starting funds, money possessed by newly created Sim families; rather than the previous flat 20,000 simoleon (the in-game currency), families created following the installation of Apartment Life are granted a sliding scale of funds depending on family size and Sim ages. The artificial intelligence of Sims themselves is also tweaked, making Sims more capable of managing their essential motives (Energy, Hunger, and Bladder) and less inclined to enter destructive loops, such as refusing to eat while starving rather than complaining about how hungry they are.

The expansion pack adds apartments, allowing Sims to live in higher-density circumstances than the single-family housing of previous games. Up to four playable families can live in one building; additional apartments can house non-player characters (NPCs). Sims who live in apartments pay rent weekly to an NPC landlord and can socialize with Sims in other apartments. Players are able to move non-playable roommates in with their Sims, who can share an apartment's rent costs with player Sims. Roommates have a restricted version of a playable Sim's capabilities, comparable to pets in The Sims 2: Pets. They lack many characteristics of normal Sims such as being able to age, die, or have children, and rather than normal motives they have a "Roommate Satisfaction" meter, which measures their happiness with a living situation. Should the meter drop sufficiently low, such as if their mood or relationships with other Sims in a household are poor, they can stop paying rent or decide to move out.

Apartment Life introduces a basic system of socioeconomic distinctions to The Sims 2. Lots (households and communal areas) are characterized as "low", "middle", or "high" social class, based on factors such as their property value, the area's density, and the value of nearby buildings. The expansion adds a new type of NPCs called "social group townies", which are six kinds of characters intended to correspond with this new system: the underclass Gearheads, the lower middle class Bohemians, the middle class Jocks, the upper middle class Techs, and the upper class Socialites. Social group townies inhabit areas around their classes, are inclined to certain jobs and hobbies, and have characteristic social interactions; for instance, Bohemians inhabit "low" and "middle" areas, are frequently in the Artist, Dance, or Music careers, and have the special "earthy hug" and "tell story about art" interactions.

Playable Sims are able to build reputations in their neighborhoods based on their interactions with non-playable Sims. Sims who are good friends with non-playable Sims can randomly receive benefits such as higher wages, introductions to potential new friends, and discounts on items; those who make enemies with non-playable Sims can suffer corresponding penalties, such as being demoted at work. As well as individual friendships, reputation is impacted by a Sim's overall interactions with the community. Sims' reputations are improved by acting friendly towards NPC Sims, and decreased by hostility towards them. Sims with positive reputations see benefits such as improved party scores and job performance, while those with negative reputations face repercussions like limited roommate candidates and decreased romantic success.

A good-aligned witch and warlock

In line with the introduction of supernatural Sims in previous expansion packs, Apartment Life adds witchcraft to the game. (Note: Sims with magic powers are generically referred to as witches. When relevant, male witches are referred to as warlocks. These terms are consistent regardless of a witch's alignment.) Sims can become witches by befriending a witch NPC, of which there exists one each for good and evil witches, and asking to learn the practice. Witches exist on an alignment scale, being good, neutral, or evil. In an interview with the developers, one stated the scale was set up to permit moral complexity in gameplay. Alignment changes both as Sims cast spells and as they study magic, with the player being able to direct witches to specifically study good, neutral, or evil magic. Witches of different alignments have different distinctive outfits, and good and evil witches are by default less friendly to one another than other Sims. Casting spells requires a sufficient spell level and access to items called reagents, which are expended when a spell is cast. Spells include teleportation, summoning spectral cat assistants, and summoning bees to attack other Sims.

Apartment Life adds a new pre-made neighborhood, Belladonna Cove. Belladonna Cove is the largest pre-made neighborhood in The Sims 2, with 49 lots. Unlike the more suburban or small-town structures of previous neighborhoods, Belladonna Cove is a higher-density urban environment. The neighborhood is structured around the expansion pack's social class feature, with geographically distinct areas of higher and lower socioeconomic status. The centre of the neighborhood features a statue of Bella Goth, a significant character in The Sims 2's backstory. A member of a wealthy family, Goth disappeared under mysterious circumstances in the in-game time between the original game and The Sims 2. Though Goth recurs in later games, often linked to witchcraft or aliens, her whereabouts during The Sims 2 are kept ambiguous in-game. Speculation that Goth is a witch was frequent amongst players, including suggestions she would appear as one in Apartment Life prior to its release.

== Soundtrack ==
The soundtracks of all Sims releases from The Sims 2 onwards feature musicians covering their existing songs in Simlish, the game's constructed language. Musicians who featured on the soundtrack for The Sims 2: Apartment Life include Katy Perry, Good Charlotte, Tally Hall, Does It Offend You, Yeah?, and Gabriella Cilmi. Cilmi, then aged sixteen, was the youngest artist to appear on a Sims soundtrack. She stated in an interview that she was a fan of the series, having first played it in 2002. Upon the tracklist's announcement, Mike Fahey of Kotaku negatively compared it to The Sims 2: FreeTime's soundtrack, which featured They Might Be Giants, and stated that Good Charlotte were overrepresented on video game soundtracks.

== Reception and legacy ==
The Sims 2: Apartment Life received positive reviews on release, with a Metascore of 75, corresponding to a "generally favorable" reception. Reviewers praised the expansion pack's additions, but remarked that its late entry in the series overshadowed its potential; The Sims 3 was due to release in early 2009, and Apartment Life was perceived as an eleventh-hour addition likely to be subjugated by the newer game. Apartment Life was the sixteenth-highest-selling PC game of 2008 and the ninth-highest-selling of the last week of May 2009, just prior to The Sims 3's release. It left the top ten charts following the next game's release that June. Apartment Life has been positively received in retrospect, and later entries in the series have expanded upon its themes.

=== Contemporary reception ===
Contemporary reviews for Apartment Life were generally positive. Charles Onyett at IGN deemed it "a worthy addition to the sprawling realm of The Sims 2"; Jess Nickelsen at NZGamer praised its "awesome new features" and particularly commended its magic system, which she had hoped would feature in a Sims 2 release. The expansion's variety of options was the focus of many reviews, particularly the unorthodox decision to introduce magic in an expansion not themed around it.

Reviewers focused on the opportunities presented by apartments. Multiple reviewers mentioned the lower upfront costs of renting compared to buying, expanding housing options for Sims with limited finances. A staff writer for the Belgian branch of GameSpot drew attention to the fact Sims could visit their neighbors on the same lot, rather than needing to move between lots to socialize and facing long loading screens in the process. Sarah Green at 1Up focused on the combination of these social opportunities and the new networking system. She felt that the potential for apartment-dwelling Sims to make more friends synergized with the personal and career opportunities presented by the networking system, improving gameplay and "facilitating a great new life" for Sims.

The lack of privacy of communal living was mentioned by several critics; reviewers drew particular attention to the fact apartment neighbors were often noisy, keeping playable Sims up late at night. The implementation of roommates was the subject of some criticism, with reviewers finding faults with their artificial intelligence. Mahamari Tsukitaka at Game Chronicles mentioned the risk of roommates "set[ting] the stove on fire or clog[ging] the toilet", while Michael Lafferty of GameZone felt their behavior "sometimes [...] seem[s] to make little sense". Jason Venter, the editor-in-chief of HonestGamers, criticized the roommate AI but commented their consistent rent payments were "something I've learned you can't always expect from real-life roommates".

Apartment Life's implementation of magic was praised. Nickelsen compared Apartment Life to the first game's magic-focused expansion The Sims: Makin' Magic, stating she had been looking forward to a similar release for The Sims 2. Christian Dubarry of Jeuxvideo.com praised the entertainment value of evil spells, though noted the hit to a Sim's reputation they could cause if overused. In an overall mixed review, Maxime Chao, the editor-in-chief of JeuxActu, deemed witchcraft the expansion's major asset. He complimented both the ability of good spells to improve Sims' lives and the capacity of evil ones to wreak havoc, which he jokingly called "the kind of little things you'd like to do yourself in real life". Multiple reviewers gave plaudits for the option for witches to travel by broomstick, rather than car, bus, or taxi. Though the witchcraft system was well-liked, several reviewers felt it was incongruous in an expansion pack nominally themed around apartments.

Apartment Life was the final expansion pack released for The Sims 2. It came out less than a year prior to The Sims 3, the next main entry in the series. Multiple reviewers discussed the expansion within this context; Nickelsen worried the expansion may have came out too late to reach its full potential, stating players could overlook its "fantastic" additions while anticipating The Sims 3. Lafferty expressed concern that Maxis and EA Games were "stretching it a bit to maintain viable content" for Sims 2, though positively compared Apartment Life to its predecessor The Sims 2: FreeTime. While praising the expansion pack, Onyett remarked it was coming out in the "twilight" of the base game's lifecycle and felt it was strange to recommend a Sims 2 expansion pack when Sims 3 was so close to release.

=== Later reception ===
In the years following its release, Apartment Life has been recognized as a significant expansion pack for The Sims 2. In an IGN review of The Sims 4: City Living, Ángel Llamas deemed both City Living and Apartment Life to be amongst some of the most important entries for their respective games. Madeline Bliek at TheGamer, in a ranking of The Sims 2's premade neighborhoods, ranked Apartment Life's Belladonna Cove in first place. Calling it the most "impressive" of the game's neighborhoods, she felt the developers had "went all out" with its complexity and called its statue of Bella Goth an "iconic" addition.

Apartment Life's themes have been revisited in later entries in the series. Witches recurred in The Sims 3: Supernatural and The Sims 4: Realm of Magic. The magic system in Supernatural expanded upon that of Apartment Life, introducing a larger and more complex system of spells and potions. Realm of Magic restructured the game's approach to magic, renaming witches to "spellcasters" and introducing a system based around alchemy, inherited traits, and magic duels. In an article for TheGamer in advance of Realm of Magic's release, Ericka Blye criticized the "Westernized" framework of magic in Apartment Life and expressed her desire to see a more global perspective in the later expansion. The inclusion of magic in an expansion not directly themed around it remained the subject of comment, with Beth Cope at Comic Book Resources calling the decision "bizarre" and "wild" and Petrana Radulovic at Polygon juxtaposing it with the more typical themes of other magic-related expansions.

High-density living reappeared in the series in The Sims 3: Late Night and The Sims 4: City Living. Grant Rodiek, senior producer for The Sims 4, expressed in an interview that Late Night's implementation of urban life was poor and "didn't even really look remotely like a city". Multiple reviewers drew direct parallels between Apartment Life and City Living; Yamilia Avendano at Twinfinite said Sims 4 expansion packs tended to "follow in line" with those of Sims 2, making the game closer to a sequel to that title than to The Sims 3 between them.

== See also ==
- The Sims 2: Apartment Pets
- The Sims: Makin' Magic
- The Sims 3 expansion packs § Late Night
- The Sims 3 expansion packs § Supernatural
- The Sims 4 expansion packs § City Living
- The Sims 4 game packs § Realm of Magic
