= The Sims 4 game packs =

2014 video game downloadable content pack list

- Genre: Life simulation
- Developer: Maxis
- Publisher: Electronic Arts
- Platforms: Microsoft Windows macOS; PlayStation 4 Xbox One
- First release: The Sims 4: Outdoor Retreat; January 13, 2015
- Latest release: The Sims 4: Werewolves; June 16, 2022

Aggregate review scores
Game	GameRankings	Metacritic
Outdoor Retreat	67.50%	66/100
Spa Day	77.50%	-
Dine Out	70.00%	-
Vampires	80.00%	-
Parenthood	90.00%	-
Jungle Adventure	80.00%	-
StrangerVille	-	-
Realm of Magic	87.67%	85/100
Star Wars: Journey to Batuu	-	70/100
Dream Home Decorator	-	80/100
My Wedding Stories	-	62/100
Werewolves	-	80/100

Twelve downloadable content "game packs" have been released for the 2014 life simulation video game The Sims 4, the fourth major title in The Sims series. All game packs are developed by Maxis and published by Electronic Arts, for the Microsoft Windows, macOS, PlayStation 4 and Xbox platforms. Game packs are intended to be smaller than full expansion packs. The first game pack, Outdoor Retreat, was released on January 13, 2015. The most recent game pack, Werewolves, was released on June 16, 2022.

== Outdoor Retreat ==
The Sims 4: Outdoor Retreat is the first game pack for The Sims 4, released on January 13, 2015. Outdoor Retreat focuses on camping trips and other outdoor activities, with gameplay and vacation locations similar to those in The Sims 2: Bon Voyage and The Sims: Vacation. Outdoor Retreat includes a new world as well as new objects, outfits and interactions.

=== Gameplay ===
Outdoor Retreat introduces Granite Falls, a new world which has two neighborhoods, one a national park, and the other consisting of five vacation rental properties. Sims can only visit Granite Falls by vacationing there. A vacation can be scheduled for up to seven days, and employed Sims can use vacation days to receive their regular pay while visiting Granite Falls. Sims can take part in various new group activities, including stargazing, cloudgazing, campfire stories, and a new party, the Weenie Roast. New foods, including marshmallows, hot dogs and bugs, can be cooked at campfires.

More than 60 Build/Buy mode items are added in Outdoor Retreat. Some items, such as portable beds, tents and foodstuffs, are designed to be used while camping, and can be purchased from both Build mode and a ranger station in the national park.

Outdoor Retreat introduces a new trait, aspiration and skill for Sims. Sims with the Squeamish trait will become uncomfortable around insects, vomiting, violence, death and anything dirty. A new nature aspiration, Outdoor Enthusiast, awards an exclusive trait on completion. Sims can also learn the new herbalism skill, with which they can identify plants and insects and craft new items such as insect repellent.

== Spa Day ==
The Sims 4: Spa Day is the second game pack for The Sims 4, released on July 14, 2015. It adds spas to the game, where Sims can go to receive massages, along with mud baths, do yoga, get manicures and more. Players can also build their own spas. This theme draws from spa retreats that were first featured in The Sims: Superstar, then subsequently in the Sunlit Tides DLC content through The Sims 3 Store.

=== Gameplay ===
Spa Day introduces a new Spa lot assignment and a Wellness skill that unlocks new abilities and food and drink recipes. Sims can visit spas for various activities, including a revitalizing massage or working on the Wellness skill with some yoga or meditation. Higher Wellness skill levels enable the Sim to do more yoga poses and unlock more interactions with new Spa Day items.

Relaxing mud baths, body soaks, saunas and massages are added for both Spa and home lots. Sims can receive hand and foot massages on any lot type using the new massage chair, and mud baths and body soaks, additional ways for Sims to relieve their stress, can be taken in a bathtub on any lot type. Saunas add a new death type: Death by Steam.

Yoga returns from previous titles as a skill for Sims to develop; yoga mats are new objects that can be purchased in buy mode and used on any lot type, and on Spa lots, Sims can take part in yoga classes. Aquariums also return from previous titles: Sims can catch or buy fish and put them into an aquarium for other Sims to view, and new fish have been added to the fish collection. There is a new Radio Station called “New Age”. Over 100 buy and build mode items are introduced in Spa Day, along with new spa-themed and athletic clothes.

==== Pack refresh ====
On September 2, 2021, Maxis revealed a pack refresh for Spa Day. It was released as a free patch on September 7, 2021, making Spa Day the first content pack for The Sims 4 to receive a significant content update post-release. The new content includes a new trait, aspirations, manicures, pedicures and allowing toddler and child Sims to participate in yoga and meditation. Sims can also conduct wellness classes for other Sims.

== Dine Out ==
The Sims 4: Dine Out is the third game pack for The Sims 4, released on June 7, 2016. It includes a new venue type; a Restaurant, many new objects, new outfits, new interactions, new foods to make and a new active career; Restaurant Owner. Similar to the Business as Usual Venue from The Sims 3, and The Sims 2: Open for Business, Sims can go dining out and be a restaurant owner. However, it focuses more on being a restaurant owner, similar to being a restaurant owner in Open for Business.

=== Gameplay ===
Dine Out introduces the new restaurant venue, which is the main focus of the pack. Restaurants act similarly as they did in Open for Business. Players can see inside the building, and Sims that have entered can be seen and directed. Sims can go to the host station to order a table, and the host will then direct them to a nearby table that has at least one chair. Groups of Sims, such as ones on a date, on an outing with friends or on a club gathering, can be placed together at the same table. Sims can then call the waiter and order up to one meal and one drink at a time. Sims can eat more meals if they wish, which will add to their bill. The food menu shows 4 categories, drinks, appetizers, main course, and dessert. Restaurants can serve any type of food or drinks, along with different presets for the Sims to choose from.

Sims can also own, build and manage restaurants. Sims can buy a restaurant from the Owned Businesses Panel. After building the restaurant with the required objects and hiring employees, Sims can open the restaurant and start managing it the way they want. Satisfied customers will give out points that can be used to buy perks to help out the restaurant, and employees can be promoted and leveled up to raise the satisfaction of the customers.

Experimental food is a new food type in Dine Out. Sims can learn these recipes by eating them and then cooking them with the chef station with the right cooking skill. Sims can also take pictures of these foods, with the photos being part of a new collection. A new radio station called "Jazz" is introduced. Over 100 Build/Buy mode items are introduced in Dine Out. Some of these include chef stations, host and waiter stations, and dining booths, along with new clothing for Sims to dress in the perfect fashion when going to the restaurants.

== Vampires ==
The Sims 4: Vampires is the fourth game pack for The Sims 4, released on January 24, 2017. It includes a new life state, Vampires, many Gothic-themed objects, new outfits, new interactions, new aspirations, new foods to make and new skills: Pipe Organ and Vampire Lore. The pack also features a new neighborhood called Forgotten Hollow which, fitting with the vampiric theme, has longer nighttimes than other neighborhoods. The pack uses vampiric elements from The Sims 2: Nightlife, The Sims 3: Late Night and Supernatural.

=== Gameplay ===
Vampires introduces the vampire life state with a whole bunch of new supernatural powers and abilities. Vampires can alter their appearance between their regular and dark forms, and can use supernatural abilities including super speed, turning into a bat, having super strength, being able to turn into mist, etc. Vampires can be made straight from Create-a-Sim and have their own special options, such as an alternative "dark" form, editing their eyes to be unnatural eye colors, pale skin tones, different fang types, and veins. Sims can also ask vampires to be turned. If they comply, the vampire will bite the Sim and then offer them their blood which the Sim will drink. Sims will not immediately transform, but will get the "Strangely Hungry" moodlet which causes their hunger need to drain.

Vampires will have their own panel to gain and upgrade new abilities that make them more powerful. They can choose certain powers as they gain more experience and become stronger. There are a total of twenty-five powers, divided evenly (five per Vampire Rank), with several powers having their own tiers. Also some powers conflict with certain weaknesses, preventing you from picking them. Vampires also have different needs to normal Sims. Vampires do not need to cater to a bladder meter and their energy need is elongated and replaced with "Vampiric Energy" as well as the hunger need being replaced with a "Thirst" need for plasma. The needs panel also showcases the experience to achieve the next vampire rank and the power points.

Just like aliens from Get to Work, vampires have a Sim form and an alternative form in which they can switch between to keep their vampiric presence from being revealed. They will switch into their "Dark Form" to turn into their true vampiric nature and access some of their supernatural powers, such as feeding and turning other Sims. The Dark Form can be fully customized separately from their normal form. There are two brand new skills called pipe organ and vampire lore. Pipe organ is the equivalent of the piano skill for the new pipe organ object, and vampire lore helps vampires become stronger. There are also three new aspirations: Vampire Family, Master Vampire, and Good Vampire. The pack includes 151 Build/Buy mode items and new clothing and hair styles for Sims aged children to elder, as well as three new lot traits.

== Parenthood ==
The Sims 4: Parenthood is the fifth game pack for The Sims 4, released on May 30, 2017. It develops the bond between parents and their children with the newly introduced Parenting skill. It takes elements from The Sims 3: Generations.

=== Gameplay ===
Parenthood introduces character values for toddler, child and teen Sims, and gives parents more control over their offspring. They can be either disciplined or encouraged, both affecting their journey to adulthood. There are five different character values: Manners, Responsibility, Empathy, Conflict Resolution and Emotional Control. Character values appear in the Simology panel for Sims aged toddler to teen. Parents can encourage or discipline their children to help develop these character values. A toddler, child, or teen can affect their own character values by performing certain interactions, such as making a mess or setting the table. If Sims have a high or low enough level in any of the character values, they will receive special traits when they become young adults.

One of the other big changers to children's character values is the new parenting skill. This skill can only be learned by Sims who are young adults or older, and helps them by having more options on raising their children. Parents with this skill can punish their children in many ways ranging from time outs to grounding, where parents can restrict certain activities. However, children can ignore these punishments, negatively affecting their character values. Children will also come to ask their parent or caregiver different questions in the form of chance cards. The higher the parenting skill is with the caregiver, the more options will appear that will affect the children's character values. When a child becomes a young adult, they will have a new type of relationship status with their parent, based on how high their friendship meter was during childhood, and how much discipline they received. Children and teens will now sometimes bring school projects when coming home from school. These projects can be crafted together by family members older than toddlers and can be done either carefully or sloppily. Doing the project either way and with or without help will determine its quality level that are poor, good, and excellent. When children or teens bring the completed projects back to school, their performance will increase.

Toddlers, children, and teens can now experience different types of phases, ranging from picky eaters to Sims who want to dress in a bear costume. The phases are in the form of traits and affect the growing Sims' actions greatly. When a Sim enters a phase, a notification will appear informing the player about it. Parents can also ask their children about the phases and will be informed of ways to get rid of them. Over 93 Build/Buy mode items are introduced in Parenthood. New clothing and hairstyles are also included for all ages, along with a brand new aspiration called Super Parent, which is centered around raising children to adults.

== Jungle Adventure ==
The Sims 4: Jungle Adventure is the sixth game pack for The Sims 4, released on February 27, 2018. The pack features gameplay similar to The Sims 3: World Adventures, and Sims can book a vacation to Selvadorada, where they can develop their Selvadoradian culture skill, explore hidden locations and find ancient artifacts.

=== Gameplay ===
Jungle Adventure offers Sims a brand new vacation world to visit, called Selvadorada. Selvadorada is based on the Latin American region surrounded by vast expanses of jungle, called Belomisia Jungle, that has hidden ruins to explore, treasure chests to loot, and ancient Omiscan temples with various puzzles and traps that Sims has to endure, in order to get to the grand treasure. Alongside the jungle Selvadorada includes a small settlement, called Puerto Llamante Marketplace, in which Sims can interact with locals and try out new food, raising their Selvadoradian culture skill. Sims can also purchase gear from the markets in order to be more prepared for the jungle. Inside the jungles of Selvadorada there are many forms of locations for Sims to explore. Many waterfalls and beautiful scenery, dominated with bridges and passageways that can lead to natural pools, quaint lagoons with fishing spots, overgrown gardens and even a plane crash site. These passageways usually require Sims to cut through vines, which will lead them to an adventure in the form of chance cards. The jungle also contains natural dangers such as bees and spiders, that can be annoying to unprepared Sims.

While Sims are exploring the jungle world, they may find ancient artifacts and treasure through treasure chests and dig piles, scattered throughout Belomisia Jungle. The new archaeology skill heavily focuses on digging up, authenticating, and studying ancient artifacts. These artifacts and treasure, however, are not the only form of collectible, as relics are also introduced. They are usually found in forms of relic bases and tops, that can be fused together with a refined crystal to create a mystical relic. These mystical relics contain many forms of blessings and curses within them, that Sims can use to their advantage or disadvantage. Skeletons are introduced as a temporary life state and summonable NPC. They are commonly found in the temples, scaring any adventurers trying to get to the treasure. Skeletons can also be temporary helpers who do chores and look after children while their parents are away. They can be summoned through a rare relic and do not have bladder, hunger, energy and hygiene needs. Sims can become skeletons for 2 days through the use of a different relic. Over 170 Build/Buy mode items are introduced in Jungle Adventure, along with many new Create-a-Sim clothing, hair and accessories. Two new aspirations called Jungle Explorer and Archaeology Scholar are included, both focusing on the world of Selvadorada. Two new lot traits are introduced as well, called "Creepy Crawlies" and "Peace And Quiet". Various new additions to the fish, fossil, crystal and gardening collections have also been added.

== StrangerVille ==
The Sims 4: StrangerVille is the seventh game pack for The Sims 4, released on February 26, 2019. The game pack is inspired by Strangetown, a neighborhood in The Sims 2.

=== Gameplay ===
StrangerVille adds the desert town of StrangerVille, where Sims have to solve mysteries and puzzles in order to cure all the local residents. Unlike The Sims 2 console editions, StrangerVille does not lock the player into a specific story, but gives a backstory as well as a narrative for the player to potentially explore. Completing the StrangerVille aspiration goals takes the player through the story, which involves scientists, military, conspiracy theorists, plants, and a secret lab. A new military career, aspiration, trait and Strange Tunes radio station is introduced.

When the player first loads the world of StrangerVille, some town locals are clearly infected with a mysterious illness: a possessed emotion, a strange walkstyle and talking gibberish about a "Mother Plant". Strange blue alien plants also dot the town. It is up to the player to investigate by talking to locals and explore the secret lab in order to find a cure for this strange illness.

== Realm of Magic ==
The Sims 4: Realm of Magic is the eighth game pack for The Sims 4, released on 10 September 2019. With a focus on witchcraft and magic, it draws inspiration from The Sims: Makin' Magic, the magic system in The Sims 2: Apartment Life, and The Sims 3: Supernatural.

=== Gameplay ===
Realm of Magic introduces Glimmerbrook, a new residential world. Glimmerbrook features a portal into a separate, floating, fantasy-like neighborhood, The Magic Realm, where magic NPCs live. A new life state, spellcaster, is introduced. They are largely similar to witches from previous games, in that they can learn magic spells and brew potions. Similar to vampires in Vampires, spellcasters have a variety of skills and abilities they can unlock as they progress through a rank system. They are also the first occult in The Sims 4 to not have a secondary form. Spellcasters can bind themselves an unlimited number of familiars, such as dragons, phoenixes or with Cats & Dogs, dogs and cats. However, only one familiar can be summoned at a time.

=== Reception ===
Realm of Magic received "generally favorable reviews", according to a score of 85/100 on review aggregator Metacritic. Gaming website Polygon praised the pack as 'a fantastic pack to play around in' but raised the concern that 'this power fantasy is capable of automating and trivializing much of the game'. GamesRadar+ gave the games positives as "brand new questline", "the chance to change the whole Sims 4 world" and "spooky new pet familiars". But, included the negative that it "can make day-to-day Sim needs irrelevant".

== Star Wars: Journey to Batuu ==
The Sims 4: Star Wars: Journey to Batuu is the ninth game pack for The Sims 4, released on September 8, 2020. The pack allows Sims to go on adventures based on the fantasy science fiction franchise Star Wars. Journey to Batuu is the only The Sims 4 DLC to feature an intellectual property from outside the Sims franchise.

=== Gameplay ===
The pack includes a new destination world, Batuu, inspired by Star Wars: Galaxy's Edge. It is a desert planet in the distant Star Wars galaxy in a star system with three suns and two moons. To visit, Sims will have to vacation there or wait for a phone call from a friend. Batuu consists of three neighborhoods, each corresponding with its faction: Black Spire Outpost; Scoundrel faction, First Order District; First Order faction, and Resistance Encampment; Resistance faction. Each neighborhood has a non-editable lot and a faction-specific spaceship to explore in. Batuu also features rabbit holes to visit for needs such as buying food, sleeping or shopping for goods.

Whilst there, galactic credits are used as currency instead of simoleons and Sims everywhere must wear Batuu outfits, which can be customized. The player will choose to align themselves with up to two of the three factions: Scoundrel, First Order or Resistance. To do so, missions have to be performed for a specific faction. Upon successful completion of the mission, the Sim's influence towards the faction will increase, eventually becoming a member of that faction. Sims also earn galactic credits or bonus items as rewards for finishing missions. Reaching higher levels of influence with a faction will bring benefits such as access to its secret areas, permission to fly their spaceship or more social interactions.

Sims can only gain influence with either the First Order or the Resistance. Performing missions for one faction will decrease its influence on the other. For example, a successful mission for the First Order nets a Sim more influence with the First Order but as a consequence, its influence with the Resistance is decreased. However influence points for the Scoundrel faction is unaffected and can be gained regardless of a Sim's alignment with the First Order or the Resistance.

=== Controversy and fan reaction ===
Immediately after the pack announcement on August 27, 2020, player reaction to the release of Star Wars: Journey to Batuu was overwhelmingly negative, with TheGamer calling it "the most contentious DLC for The Sims 4 to date". Jonathan Lee wrote an article for Yahoo!, describing the fan reaction following the announcement of the pack at Gamescom 2020. Lee wrote that fans "slammed [the trailer] right out the gate" and adding that "at the time of writing this article, the trailer for Journey to Batuu holds the unenviable ratio of 28K likes and 59K dislikes [on YouTube]." Lee went on to mention fans frustration for the game having "more skin tones for aliens than for black people" referring to the controversy regarding the darker skin tones in the game. Lee explained that fans had been asking for features deemed more important by fans, such as bunk beds, real babies, and gameplay improvements.

Fans cited a limited appeal of the pack and a desire for the developers to focus on other things, such as hotels, school life, and new worlds. Players felt it deprioritized features that were still missing from the game, and indicated this game pack release was part of EA's roadmap for the game in 2020 and that EA had worked on it for months. Others presumed that it was a contractual obligation given EA's ownership of the Star Wars video game franchise.

An independent poll, hosted by Digital Spy in January 2020, eight months before the announcement of the pack, asked players to vote for what themes they would like to see in future The Sims 4 packs out of twenty-one choices. The choices included themes such as hotels, cars, murder mystery, farming and Star Wars. Star Wars ended up in the bottom place with 2.9k votes, 1.2k less than the placeholder above it, veganism, which came in at 4.1k votes. The top 5 placeholders were hotels, which placed at number 1 with 18.5k votes, school life, new worlds, farming and cars. Game Rant wrote that the release "frustrated fans considerably." Lyndsay Pearson, executive producer and general manager of The Sims 4, addressed the criticism in a series of tweets on September 1, 2020, taking responsibility for approving of the Star Wars pack. She also stated that the development team were continuing to work on different projects for the game at the same time and assured players that they were not ignoring their feedback.

=== Reception ===
Star Wars: Journey to Batuu received "mixed or average reviews", according to a score of 70/100 on Metacritic. CNN described the pack in a positive light, commenting "It delivers a ton of content for the value, with three lands and a full storyline with three routers. There's plenty of fun to be had in the Sims version of Batuu." Air Entertainment gave the expansion a score of 90%, applauding the amount of content in the pack and stating "The most outstanding feature is the inclusion of factions and new missions, which really drives the story element of the sci-fi DLC." Darkstation gave it four out of five stars, summarizing "it absolutely nails everything that makes Star Wars: Galaxy's Edge one of the most unique theme park attractions today."

Other reviews were more critical, praising the game's visuals but criticizing the gameplay. Screen Rant called the gameplay "repetitive" and wrote that the pack "neglects the very nature of the game and the reason it has such a dedicated fanbase: the sandbox element." Digital Spy shared a similar sentiment, writing that the pack is "let down by a weak narrative, dull missions, and a self-contained experience that fails to play to the franchise's strengths."

== Dream Home Decorator ==
The Sims 4: Dream Home Decorator is the tenth game pack for The Sims 4, released on June 1, 2021. The pack adds interior design to the game as an occupation, as well as several new types of furniture; features of which were all first introduced in The Sims 3: Ambitions.

=== Gameplay ===
Dream Home Decorator introduces the Interior Decorator career, where Sims visit clients' homes (or community lots, depending on their career level) and renovate them based on the clients' preferences. Similar to the Architectural Designer career from The Sims 3: Ambitions, the Interior Decorator career borrows a lot from its predecessor, while expanding upon it. Once a Sim chooses the Interior Decorator career from their phone or computer, the career panel will host a button for the player to choose a gig. Gigs are broken down into room renovations, room additions, level renovations, level additions, and commercial renovations.

Each gig will display base pay, budget, and which household is offering the gig. The chosen gig will be displayed in the career panel and show a list of requirements the sim should do to ensure a better result. A Sim can only hold one gig at a time, every gig lasts 12 hours from 9am and 9pm. Once the Sim arrives at a client's lot, they have to greet the clients and understand their likes and dislikes. Likes and dislikes will consist of decor styles, colors, and hobbies. Displayed under the gig in the career panel will be a list of up to five likes or dislikes. Constraints can include not increasing the building footprint (no additional floor tiles) and restrictions to the top or bottom floors. This will prevent the player from being able to modify certain aspects of the lot. Paying attention to the budget, likes and dislikes will ensure a better result.

=== Reception ===
Dream Home Decorator received "generally favorable reviews", according to a score of 80/100 on Metacritic. GamesRadar+ described the expansion as "For those of us who love building,... a dream." which had "kicked up a ton of excitement in the Sims community." Entertainment magazine Digital Spy gave the pack 3.5 out of 5 stars, concluding that it "isn't for everyone, but those who enjoy renovating homes will be impressed by a generous variety of items and an engaging new career, even if the amount of new gameplay is on the slight side. It's a shame that the pack has launched with a troubling amount of bugs, and anyone considering making the purchase at this moment in time should keep that in mind." TechRaptor gave the pack a rating of 9/10, summarising that "A renewed focus on gameplay sets Dream Home Decorator apart as some of the best downloadable content that The Sims 4 has seen in years."

== My Wedding Stories ==
The Sims 4: My Wedding Stories is the eleventh game pack for The Sims 4, released on February 23, 2022. The pack adds a revamped wedding event system to the game, a new world named Tartosa, as well as other new interactions relating to weddings. This represents an attempt to deepen the gameplay and experience of weddings, which have been a staple milestone dating back to The Sims 2 (and by some measure, the original The Sims).

=== Controversy ===
One day after the pack announcement, Maxis stated that they will not release the pack in Russia, citing laws prohibiting content promoting homosexuality as a societal norm. After strong backlash and feedback from Russian players, Maxis reversed their decision and released the pack in Russia unaltered, stating that they had "reassessed their options". Since March 2022, Electronic Arts has suspended all video game sales in Russia due to the ongoing Russian invasion of Ukraine. Additionally, after the pack's February 23, 2022 release, it received criticism from players and reviewers for its numerous bugs and glitches, which render the game's headline wedding event feature unplayable. Maxis released a patch to address some of these glitches on March 31, 2022.

=== Reception ===
My Wedding Stories received "mixed or average reviews", according to a score of 62/100 on Metacritic, the lowest for a game pack to date. In a negative review, entertainment magazine Digital Spy gave the pack 2 out of 5 stars, criticizing the pack's numerous bugs and issues, describing it as in an "alarmingly terrible state".

== Werewolves ==
The Sims 4: Werewolves is the twelfth game pack for The Sims 4, released on June 16, 2022. It introduces a new life state, werewolves and a new world, Moonwood Mill. The pack also features two werewolf packs in the new world, an underground system that can be explored, and lore surrounding features in the game pack and overall game. This pack attempts to deepen the experience of playing as werewolves, a concept which was first introduced in The Sims 2: Pets and later expanded upon in The Sims 3: Supernatural.

=== Gameplay ===
The gameplay revolves around the werewolf life state. Werewolves have a perk tree similar to spellcasters and vampires, along with dormant abilities, which are unlocked by satisfying certain conditions. Werewolves also have a 'fury' system, which has similarities to the spellcaster's charge. When a werewolf's fury fills up completely, they go into an uncontrollable rampage. Fury increases overtime, but can be sped up with temperaments, and other actions. The lunar cycle can also affect werewolves, with the full moon resulting in dramatically increased fury gains.

=== Reception ===
Werewolves received "generally favourable reviews", according to a score of 80/100 on Metacritic.

== See also ==
- The Sims 4 expansion packs
- The Sims 4 stuff packs
