= The Sims 2: Open for Business =

Expansion pack for The Sims 2

- Developer: Maxis
- Publishers: Electronic Arts (PC); Aspyr Media (Mac)
- Platforms: Microsoft Windows; Mac OS X
- Release: Windows: NA: February 28, 2006; EU: March 3, 2006; Mac OS X September 4, 2006

The Sims 2: Open for Business is an expansion pack for the 2004 life simulation video game The Sims 2, developed by Maxis and published by Electronic Arts. It was released February 28, 2006 as the third expansion pack for the game. Open for Business adds tycoon elements to the base game, allowing Sims to run businesses from their homes or community lots. Multiple new advancement systems are added, such as talent badges, which track Sims' progress in business skills; business ranks, which measure a business's success based on its company loyalty; and business perks, gifts or skills granted to a Sim for running a successful business. The expansion pack also expands upon elements introduced by previous expansions, such as restaurants and romantic chemistry, and expands the base game's building options.

The original design vision for Open for Business was to expand the range of creative or productive options available in the base game, which evolved over time into a tycoon-style game. Open for Business was a commercial success, becoming the third highest-selling PC game of 2006. Critical opinion was generally positive, exploring the expansion's significant gameplay divergence from the more domestic life simulator goals of The Sims 2. Reviewers praised its intricacy and the greater control it gave players over non-playable Sims, but were divided over its accessibility and how enjoyable the process of running a business was. Since its release, Open for Business has been used as a pedagogical tool for business students and teaching mathematics.

== Background and development ==
The Sims is a franchise of life simulation games developed by Maxis and published by Electronic Arts. It has sold over 200 million copies amongst all platforms and installments, making it one of the best-selling video game franchises of all time. The Sims 2, sequel to the original, was released on September 14, 2004. It expanded upon the original game's features, introducing elements such as an aspiration system based around short-term and long-term goals; expanded character and neighborhood customization; and the ability for Sims to raise families, age, and progress through generations.

All main entries in the series have had multiple expansion packs, which add further gameplay options. Rather than being relatively simple downloadable content, expansion packs for the first three games in the Sims series substantially expanded upon the base game's life simulation; Kieron Gillen, writing for Eurogamer in 2005, stated the first game's expansions "could have been expanded [...] into games of their own" and argued their complexity was a component in why The Sims had few competitors in its genre. Eight expansion packs were released for The Sims 2 between 2005 and 2008.

The Sims 2: Open for Business, the game's third expansion pack, was first teased in its predecessor The Sims 2: Nightlife in September 2005. It was officially announced in January 2006 and released February 28, 2006. The original design vision for Open for Business was to expand the range of creative or productive options available in the base game, inspired by the popularity of the in-game easel, which allowed Sims to make and sell paintings. Over the course of development, it evolved into a business simulation game. In an Eurogamer interview with the game's senior producers Tim LeTourneau and Don Laabs, Laabs regaled a story of a developer running an in-game business selling "stolen Xbox 360s".

During the expansion pack's development, EA originally intended to include product placement for real-world companies. Julie Shumaker, the company's director of game advertising sales, stated to Bloomberg that she concluded it would worsen the player experience by "breaking the Sims fantasy"; Reena Jana, reporting on her statement, juxtaposed this with EA's product placement deals with McDonald's and Intel for The Sims Online, a massively multiplayer online game launched in 2002.

== Gameplay ==
The Sims 2: Open for Business revamps The Sims 2's employment system, introducing self-employment alongside the structured career tracks of the base game. Sims are able to run businesses out of their homes or on community lots they own; there is no limit to how many businesses a Sim can run, nor are they limited to only one of running a business or working on a career track. The expansion introduces a number of new objects oriented around said businesses, such as "crafting stations" for objects such as toys and flower arrangements. The salon chair drew particular attention from reviewers; it let players control the appearance of non-playable Sims, allowing them to "dole out hideous makeovers to your neighbours for a sky-high fee". Tom Bramwell at Eurogamer specifically mentioned "doll[ing] up some ordinary bloke in braids and face paint at the salon and he tips you extra".

Open for Business introduces talent badges, a new system of advancement that tracks Sims' skills in "business-critical tasks". There are seven talent badges: Cosmetology, Flower Arranging, Cashiering, Restocking, Robotics, Sales, and Toy Making. Talent badges are ranked as "bronze", "silver", and "gold", marking increasing aptitude in the relevant area. Sims with higher talent badges are more productive and competent at these jobs than Sims with lower or none; for instance, a Sim with no Toy Making talent badge can only make "pet bricks", while a more competent Sim can make homemade kites or water sprinklers. Playable Sims can build talent badges, while non-playable Sims are randomly assigned them to make them more desirable as employees. Different talent badges have different thresholds for advancement, and there is no in-game indication of how close a Sim is to reaching a new badge level.

Success in Open for Business is measured by customer loyalty. Customers are more interested in patronizing businesses with cheaper products, those with higher-quality display cases, or those with more charismatic owners. Businesses in the expansion pack are tracked by Business Ranks, which measure how successful a business is based on its customer loyalty. Higher-ranked businesses draw in more customers and can be sold for higher values. Sims who run high-ranked businesses receive abilities or bonuses called Business Perks; these include direct cash transfers, bonuses to relationship with Sims they meet, and discounts on wholesale items.

Open for Business included a number of miscellaneous additions alongside its core theme. It included a number of features from The Sims 2: University and The Sims 2: Nightlife, making them accessible even to players who had not installed either expansion pack; carried-over features included Nightlife's restaurants and chemistry system and University's influence system. It also significantly revamped building options, such as by adding the ability to build conical roofs, and added more objects targeted at toddlers and children.

Following the introduction of occult life states (non-human Sims) in earlier The Sims 2 expansion packs, Open for Business introduces Servos, playable robot Sims. Servos can be made by Sims with gold talent badges in Robotics; when activated, they become fully playable Sims that function like normal Sims in most respects, including being able to have jobs, woohoo, and raise adopted children. Servos do not age or die of natural causes, and when activated they have full skill points in Mechanical, Cooking, and Cleaning. If left to their own devices, they autonomously roam the lot and act as housekeepers, such as by cleaning, repairing broken objects, and caring for children. Sims cannot be turned into Servos, but Servos can be turned into vampires or zombies.

== Soundtrack ==
Background music for The Sims 2: Open for Business was composed by Silas Hite. The expansion added a new wave-themed in-game radio station; its diegetic music was contributed by Depeche Mode, Howard Jones, Kajagoogoo, and Epoxies, who made Simlish covers of their previous songs. In an interview with Sims Network, Jones said his son, then aged eleven, was an "absolute fanatic" of the series. Ryan Davis at GameSpot praised the new station as "catchy", though queried whether it incorporated an undertone of "marketing synergy" and called it "nothing short of surreal" to hear Dave Gahan singing in Simlish.

== Reception and legacy ==
The Sims 2: Open for Business received a positive reception on release; its aggregate Metascore is 78, indicating "generally favorable reviews". Reviewers noted its tycoon-style gameplay, its higher complexity than the base game, and how it built on previous expansion packs. Since its release, Open for Business has seen use as an educational tool for business and mathematics students.

=== Contemporary reception ===
Reception

Aggregate score
Aggregator	Score
Metacritic	78/100

Review scores
Publication	Score
1Up.com	7/10
Computer and Video Games	7.2/10
Eurogamer	7/10
Game Informer	7/10
GameSpot	8/10
GameSpy	4/5
IGN	7.8/10
MacLife	2/5
PC Format	74%
PC Gamer (UK)	62%

Upon release, Open for Business was lukewarmly well-received but divisive; while PC Format suggested there was enough content for fans of The Sims while having a lot of enjoyment in "playing shop", Karen Chu, reviewing for 1UP.com, called it "the deepest, most complex, and most complementary Sims 2 expansion so far" that would appeal to hardcore management simulation fans but turn away casual gamers. Bill Stiteler at Applelinks said it "fills a crucial hole in the Sims Universe" by turning work into a true gameplay element rather than a break in gameplay, while a reviewer at Computer and Video Games who had been disappointed by prior entries declared "even though it feels so very wrong to say this, Open For Business is a Sims expansion worth buying". Reception was not universally positive; Cathy Lu's review for MacLife complained that the expansion was "work, not play" and rated it as "weak", and Dan Adams at IGN, in a mixed review, decried its "micromanagement" and the obscurity of its progression system.

Adams' review focused on Open for Business's different gameplay style to prior entries in the series, calling it "one of the more interesting versions" of the concept of business simulation games. Computer and Video Games declared that the expansion "transform[s] the core ethos of the Sims universe from a life simulator to a business tycoon game", expressing surprise its "highly polished and impressively detailed" additions were even compatible with the game. Dave Kosack at GameSpy considered Open for Business so deep as to be "almost like a whole new game", drawing attention to the unusual intricacy of its playstyle compared to prior entries.

Critics of Game Informer felt that the expansion did not succeed as a proper business simulator, lacking "any in-depth features like finding paying customers or making sure that the store location is prime real estate". Simultaneously, Game Informer and PC Gamer suggested the Sims aspect could not be fully exploited, as time for playful aspects like socialization is taken up by the "frantic micromanagement" of business finances and home life.

The greater control that Open for Business permits over non-playable Sims drew attention from several reviewers. Both Computer and Video Games and Iain McCafferty at Pro-G drew attention to the unusual work uniforms players could demand of employees; the latter said "the ninja and ape costumes are particularly fabulous", while the former proposed a housewares retail business called "Bath Knights" where employees must dress in knight costumes. Similarly, the ability to makeover existing Sims in a cosmetology or salon business drew attention as exploitable. McCafferty referenced the potential to "dole out hideous makeovers to your neighbours for a sky-high fee", including a specific example of giving an elderly Sim in a Shakespeare-themed neighborhood "dreadlocks, [a] goatee beard and green sunglasses".

Multiple reviewers felt the process of starting a business was insufficiently clear. In particular, several found the expansion failed to clarify that a business's opening hours are determined by manually flipping an open sign to closed and vice versa, delaying their ability to get their business off the ground. Once a business is established, reviewers disagreed on how straightforward they were to run. Tom Bramwell at Eurogamer felt running a business was simple once the player had worked out the initial barriers, and Computer and Video Games concurred that "the depth and intricacies of the many commands [...] are neither intimidating nor confusing". Chu suggested the different choices of business models gave player flexibility in their desired amount of effort to put in. On the contrary, Lu felt Open for Business was an unexpectedly difficult entry in the series and Stiteler, while receiving the expansion positively, found the difficulty of establishing a business a detriment.

Open for Business's synergy with prior expansion packs was commented upon by reviewers. Adams, Bramwell, Kosack and Chu all felt the combination of Open for Business with The Sims 2: University and The Sims 2: Nightlife worked welled, the former three suggesting it was superior to the expansion alone; Kosack felt they each built on one another "almost exponentially", while Adams praised the particular synergy of Nightlife and Open for Business. McCafferty complimented various features in Nightlife that had been ported to Open for Business, such as inventories, turn-ons, and turn-offs. (Note: McCafferty mistakenly states these features were introduced in Open for Business, though they were first included in Nightlife.)

Open for Business was commercially successful, becoming the third-highest-selling PC game of 2006 behind World of Warcraft and the Sims 2 base game. It was awarded a Gold ELSPA Sales Award, indicating at least 200,000 units sold in the United Kingdom.

=== Later reception ===
Since its release, Open for Business has remained the subject of critical attention. In 2022, Jord Tury at Gaming.net ranked it as the second best expansion in the series' history, praising it for increasing the range of career options in The Sims 2 "other than being a criminal or a, dare I say, journalist". Open for Business has been used as an educational tool, both for teaching business students about organizational design and in teaching mathematics.

In a 2008 interview with Rock Paper Shotgun, Rod Humble, then the lead designer on the Sims series, discussed Open for Business's reception. He expressed surprise that reviewers had, from his point of view, failed to notice the expansion's depth and the degree to which it changed base gameplay. Humble argued that reviewers neglected expansion packs by perceiving them primarily through the lens of objects and other basic add-ons, and failed to engage with the degree to which they represented radical gameplay changes.

== See also ==
- The Sims 3 expansion packs § Ambitions
- The Sims 4 expansion packs § Get to Work
- The Sims 4 game packs § Dine Out
