= The Sims 2 (GBA video game) =

2005 video game

- Developer: Amaze Entertainment
- Publisher: Electronic Arts
- Directors: Doug Schilling; Phil Trumbo
- Producers: J.C. Connors; Dan McAuliffe
- Programmer: Jason Bay
- Artists: Michael Wilcox; Tamara Knoss
- Writer: Darby McDevitt
- Composers: Ian Stocker; Kyle Johnson
- Series: The Sims
- Platform: Game Boy Advance
- Release: NA: October 24, 2005; EU: November 4, 2005
- Genre: Life simulation
- Mode: Single-player

The Sims 2 is a 2005 life simulation video game developed by Amaze Entertainment and published by Electronic Arts for the Game Boy Advance (GBA). Development of the game began following the success of The Sims 2 for personal computers. The GBA version differs significantly from the original version, being a game with linear progression in the style of a reality show and 2D isometric graphics.

It is the third and final game in the Sims series to be developed by Amaze Entertainment following The Sims Bustin' Out and The Urbz: Sims in the City. The game received mixed reviews from critics upon release.

== Gameplay and plot ==
The game takes place in a city called Strangetown, which is populated by various Sims who have no idea that they are part of a grandiose reality show called “Strangetown” and all their actions are being filmed. The show is organized by billionaire Daddy Bigbucks, who moved from the metropolis after his defeat in The Urbz. Bigbucks personally hires the player character as the star of the show and guides them via earpiece through a number of scenarios.

Before proceeding with the game, the player can customize the name, gender, skin color, clothes and hairstyle of their specific Sim. When the game is begun, their controlled Sim finds themselves in the aforementioned Strangetown, where they will henceforth live. The game is a linear action-adventure title. Some attributes of the original The Sims 2 are present, such as sustaining the player character's food, toilet, hygiene and sleep meters, and choosing an aspiration related to wealth, popularity or knowledge, which affects the further desires and knowledge of the controlled Sim. The character moves around the town to solve problems and help local residents. As the player completes tasks, the controlled Sim earns money and looks for things they need. Sims can also earn extra money by playing various mini-games (that are presented in-universe as commercials).

After completing the storyline of each episode in the reality show, the player's performance is judged by critics based on how well the main storyline was executed and how many secret easter eggs were uncovered. A large number of points increases the show's rating and unlocks new items and interactions with other characters.

== Development and release ==
Following the commercial success of The Sims 2, Electronic Arts (EA) announced on May 5, 2005, that it would release versions of The Sims 2 for additional platforms, including a version for the Game Boy Advance (GBA). Despite sharing a title, the GBA version bears little similarity to the original game, and was designed around the platform's unique features. The GBA version was developed by Amaze Entertainment, and would be the final game in the franchise developed by them. It was produced by J.C. Connors, written by Darby McDevitt, and featured level design by Dan McAuliffe.

The GBA version of The Sims 2, unlike the original game, is not an open-ended life simulator, but a game with a linear progression in which the controlled Sim must maintain the ratings of a reality show. The game contains elements of surreal and dark humor, influenced by the development team's previous work on the GBA version of The Sims Bustin' Out; the developers credited the creative freedom granted by Maxis for such a clear genre departure from the main series. Producer J.C. Connors noted that EA eventually ceased monitoring the progress of development and the creators decided to completely move away from the canon proposed in The Sims 2 for PC. Connors admitted that the lack of control allowed the writers to create strange plot twists and humor, which could be traced back to the game Bustin' Out and became more and more obvious along with the release of subsequent games.

The soundtrack for The Sims 2 was jointly created by composers Ian Stocker of Ian Stocker Sound Design and Kyle Johnson of Moontech Studios, who collaborated online to compose music for the GBA and Nintendo DS versions.

The Sims 2 was released in North America on October 24, 2005, and in Europe on November 4.

== Reception ==
Reception

Aggregate score
Aggregator	Score
Metacritic	58/100

Review scores
Publication	Score
Nintendo Power	7.5/10
Nintendo World Report	5/10

The Sims 2 was met with "mixed or average" reviews according to review aggregator Metacritic.
