= The Sims: Makin' Magic =

- Developer: Maxis
- Publishers: Electronic Arts (PC); Aspyr Media (Mac)
- Platforms: Windows; Mac OS X
- Release: Windows: NA: 29 October 2003; EU: 31 October 2003; Mac OS X: NA: 4 March 2004; EU: March 2004
- Genre: Social simulation
- Modes: Single-player, multiplayer

The Sims: Makin' Magic is a 2003 expansion pack for The Sims developed by Maxis and published by Electronic Arts. The expansion introduces magic to the game, featuring items that allows Sims to create and use spells, charms, and potions. The pack also introduces the Magic Town neighborhood, as well as Magic Town lots, which house vendors of magical ingredients and items and a number of magic-related mini-games. The game was the last expansion released for The Sims prior to the 2004 release of The Sims 2, with previews for the game included in the expansion. Upon release, Makin' Magic received generally favorable reviews from critics, with reviewers praising the novelty and depth of the magic mechanics and the Magic Town neighborhood, with some critiquing the expansion's difficulty and conceptual incompatibility compared to other aspects of the game. The expansion has received praise following its release, leading a pattern of magic-themed expansions in succeeding Sims titles including The Sims 2: Apartment Life, The Sims 3: Supernatural and The Sims 4: Realm of Magic.

== Gameplay ==
Makin' Magic provides players with the ability to perform magic tricks in Magic Town for MagiCoins.

Makin' Magic introduces a new neighborhood, Magic Town, and 175 new items with a supernatural theme, allowing Sims to create magic charms and cast spells. Ingredients are added to a Sim's inventory, from where they are used with the correct equipment to produce an item of food, or charge the Sim's magic wand with a spell, or produce a charm. These ingredients, which are many and varied, can be purchased in Magic Town or made at home with various machines and items that can be purchased. The ability to have a dragon as a pet was also introduced. Upon moving in a new family, the Mystery Man appears with a box which includes a wand, a spell book, the magic ingredients needed for the Toadification spell, a wand charger (which also dispenses wands), 35 MagiCoins, and a Hole In The Ground which provides easy access to Magic Town. Being caught casting spells outside of Magic Town by non-magical Sims is met with a fine by the Mystery Man. However this is not the case in Magic Town, although the spells may backfire as the vast majority of Magic Town residents are equipped with their own wands.

== Development and release ==
Makin' Magic was announced by Electronic Arts at the Camp EA press event in July 2003 as Making Magic, revealed as the last expansion for The Sims pending the release of The Sims 2. Shortly after announcement, the name of the expansion was shortened to Makin' Magic. The expansion was shipped on 30 October 2003. Makin' Magic contained a third disc that provided a preview of The Sims 2, including footage of the game, video interviews and screenshots.

== Reception ==
=== Sales ===
Makin' Magic was a commercial success, becoming the fifth-highest selling computer game in 2003 in the United States, and topping weekly sales charts for computer games in Europe in November 2003.

=== Reviews ===
Reception

Aggregate score
Aggregator	Score
Metacritic	80/100

Review scores
Publication	Score
Computer Gaming World	4/5
Game Informer	7.75
GameRevolution	6/10
GameSpot	8.3/10
GameSpy	4/5
GameZone	7.9/10
IGN	8.2/10
X-Play	4/5
GameNOW	A

According to review aggregator Metacritic, Makin' Magic received "generally favorable" reviews from critics. The subject matter of the expansion was met with praise and confusion. Elizabeth McAdams of Computer Gaming World considered the concept to be a good platform to "create more fun, wickedness and truly bizarre scenarios" to the game stating it renewed her interest in the game. Steve Butts of IGN commended the expansion for adding a "healthy dose of fantasy to the game, finding it "preserves the basic character of the game" and "enhances the core gameplay", although considered its theme "incompatible with the basic concept of the series". Describing the expansion as an "oddball release", Carlos McElfish of GameZone considered the expansion offered opportunities for "fun" and "inventive additions" to the game, but questioned how well they fit into the rest of the game, stating that it had a "dark, circus-like atmosphere that seems to take away from the funny and lighthearted nature of the game". Andrew Park of GameSpot found the theme less endearing, suggesting the "brighly colored amusement parks" and "sparkly magic spells" were of greater appeal to children. Nebojsa Radakovic of Game Revolution found the concept to be "not the most inspired", noting irony in the tonal shift of the game from a "send-up of reality" to a surreal one.

Critics largely praised the introduction of the magic career path, but noted its difficulty. Several reviews noted that the game's magic abilities allowed players to focus on the features of the expansion rather than spend time meeting Sim needs. Glenn Rubenstein of X-Play found the use of magic to be "entertaining" and "practical", noting the element of chance for success or failure added a "potential for chaos and unpredictability" that kept the game interesting. Steve Butts of IGN commended the "variety of effects", but found the co-ordinating game's magic gameplay and searching for ingredients could be "tedious" and a "real struggle", particularly when combined with gameplay from other expansions. Similarly, Nebojsa Radakovic of Game Revolution considered the mechanics to be "demanding" and requiring "full-time" commitment, stating that managing Sim needs can "drastically slow down any forward momentum" and makes it "almost impossible to maintain a career". Carlos McElfish of GameZone acknowledged the "challenging" nature of the magic gameplay mechanics, but considered that they added to the "freeform and dynamically difficult" appeal of the game.

Similarly to other expansions, reviewers lamented that the final expansion for the game did not introduce changes to core gameplay or graphics, and did not resolve persistent bugs. Andrew Park of GameSpot commented that the game added "no real technical improvements" to the game, stating that it "doesn't bother to fix the sluggish camera or the occasionally deficient artificial intelligence used for Sims". Similarly, Carla Harker of GameSpy considered the graphics of the expansion to "show their age", and had enduring issues with Sim pathfinding.

== Legacy ==
The inclusion of supernatural features in Makin' Magic was re-introduced in later Sims expansions, including The Sims 2: Apartment Life, The Sims 3: Supernatural and The Sims 4: Realm of Magic. Magic features in The Sims have been described as an enduring "dark horse mechanic" for the series, receiving a positive retrospective reception. Game Rant praised the expansion for its scope and "absurdity", with Shyana Josi stating that later iterations of the concept in future Sims games failed to capture the same "otherworldly wonder" of Makin' Magic due to its "depth of gameplay" and "vibrant and alive" setting of Magic Town. TheGamer considered Makin' Magic to feature content that was not included in later versions, including its vendors, amusement parks, and performances.
