= The Sims 2: Pets =

Expansion pack for The Sims 2

- Developers: Maxis; Full Fat (DS); Artificial Mind & Movement (GBA)
- Publishers: Electronic Arts; Aspyr Media (Mac)
- Series: The Sims
- Platforms: Microsoft Windows; Mac OS X PlayStation 2 PlayStation Portable; GameCube; Game Boy Advance; Nintendo DS; Wii
- Release: Microsoft Windows, GameCube, PlayStation 2: NA: October 17, 2006; EU: October 20, 2006; AU: October 26, 2006; Nintendo DS: AU: October 26, 2006; EU: October 27, 2006; NA: October 31, 2006; Mac OS X: NA: November 1, 2006; Game Boy Advance: NA: November 7, 2006; AU: November 16, 2006; EU: November 17, 2006; PlayStation Portable: NA: December 14, 2006; AU: December 14, 2006; EU: December 15, 2006; Wii: NA: June 12, 2007; EU: June 22, 2007; AU: June 28, 2007
- Genre: Life simulation
- Mode: Single-player

The Sims 2: Pets is an installment in the life simulation video game series The Sims. It was released as an expansion pack for The Sims 2 on Microsoft Windows and Mac OS X, while it was released as a stand-alone title on consoles. All versions were developed by Maxis and published by Electronic Arts on October 17, 2006. The expansion pack adds domestic animals to the game, allowing Sims to own cats, dogs, and other species. Players can customize the appearance and personality of their pets, which are able to learn tricks and work jobs. The stand-alone console games maintained the open-ended sandbox gameplay of the series; the handheld versions had more structure, including role-playing video game elements.

The game received mixed to positive reviews from critics, who praised the realism and design of the pets, but criticized the lack of content and narrow focus of the game. The PC version was compared unfavorably to previous expansion packs, while the console and handheld versions were criticized for their limitations and simplicity.

== Background and development ==
The Sims is a franchise of life simulation games developed by Maxis and published by Electronic Arts. It has sold over 200 million copies amongst all platforms and installments, making it one of the best-selling video game franchises of all time. The Sims 2, sequel to the original, was released on September 14, 2004. It expanded upon the original game's features, introducing elements such as an aspiration system based around short-term and long-term goals, expanded character and neighborhood customization, and the ability for Sims to raise families, age, and progress through generations.

All main entries in the series have had multiple expansion packs, which add further gameplay options. Rather than being relatively simple downloadable content, expansion packs for the first three games in the Sims series substantially expanded upon the base game's life simulation; Kieron Gillen, writing for Eurogamer in 2005, stated the first game's expansions "could have been expanded [...] into games of their own" and argued their complexity was a component in why The Sims had few competitors in its genre. Eight expansion packs were released for The Sims 2 between 2005 and 2008.

The Sims 2: Pets, the fourth expansion pack for the game, was announced in late July 2006. Unlike previous entries, stand-alone console versions were announced alongside the PC expansion pack; stand-alone versions of Pets were made for the PlayStation 2, PlayStation Portable, GameCube, Game Boy Advance, and Nintendo DS. It was released on October 17, 2006. A macOS port of the PC expansion pack was released three weeks later by Aspyr Media. Console ports were released for the Wii in June 2007 and the N-Gage mobile gaming service on June 18, 2008.

Pets was inspired by The Sims: Unleashed, a similar expansion for the first game. Unleashed was the highest-selling PC game of 2002, and substantial player demand existed for a Sims 2 equivalent. Will Wright, the head of the Sims series prior to that point, stepped back to focus on his next project Spore; Rod Humble became senior producer. Humble stated in an interview with GameSpot that the choice to release stand-alone console versions, a first for Sims 2 expansions, was based on the expansion's "strong theme". Console versions of The Sims had previously had disappointing sales numbers compared to the PC entries, but were "back-catalog sellers" that maintained sales over time rather than falling precipitously from a peak. Handheld entries, according to Humble, tended to outsell traditional consoles. Humble ascribed this to "the private-versus-public experiences that are fun about the Sims", differentiating between more solitary narrative gameplay and more publicizable elements, such as the game's architectural design capabilities. He stated that the architectural elements of the game would be a focus for the Pets console releases.

== Gameplay ==
=== PC version ===
The Create-a-Cat screen on the PC version of Pets

The Sims 2: Pets allows Sims to own cats, dogs, birds, and a fictional guinea pig-like species known as womrats. (Note: Unless otherwise specified, references to pets refer specifically to cats and dogs.) Pets can be acquired during gameplay or made using the "Create a Dog"/"Create a Cat" tools, which allows players to design a breed from scratch, including features and coat color. Players are not limited to naturally occurring colors. Pets work similar to other Sims; they have needs or motives that need to be provided for, such as Hunger, Energy, and Hygiene. Unlike other Sims, they cannot be directly controlled by the player and instead act autonomously. Pets are able to have careers, and can in theory be a family's primary breadwinner.

Following the introduction of supernatural or "occult" Sims in prior expansion packs, Pets adds the ability for Sims to become werewolves. Werewolves are normal Sims during the daytime, but at 8 p.m. in-game time turn into anthropomorphic wolves. They have the ability to summon wolves, and train pets at an accelerated rate compared to normal Sims. Sims become werewolves by befriending a male stray dog known as the "pack leader" and being bitten by him; werewolf Sims can also turn other Sims into werewolves in their wolf form. Over time, a werewolf's personality evolves to be more outgoing, less nice, less neat, more active, and more playful, and they automatically gain points in the body skill upon each transformation. Servos from The Sims 2: Open for Business can be turned into werewolves, and Sims can be both werewolves and vampires or zombies.

Unlike prior expansions, Pets has little content relevant to overall gameplay. It nonetheless expands the game's building options, including making it possible to build diagonal walls and rooms and octagon-shaped rooms. It also adds new cheat codes, allowing players to control pets, modify roof slopes when building, and freeze pet aging.

=== Console and PSP versions ===
Unlike the PC version, the console version of The Sims 2: Pets is a stand-alone game. Senior producer Rod Humble described it as a "more advanced version" of the original version of The Sims 2 for consoles, which had been released the year before. The game was released for PlayStation 2, GameCube, PlayStation Portable and Wii; no Xbox 360 version was released, due to the high competition expected on the platform during that release window.

Like the base game across platforms, the console version of Pets is an open-ended sandbox game. Goals the game encourages, but does not mandate, include upgrading the town square of the in-game neighborhood; unlocking pet colors, markings, and collars to use in the Create a Cat and Create a Dog processes; and unlocking new Sims to interact with. Fundamental mechanics are similar to the PC game, but work in different ways. For instance, the aspiration (long-term driving goal) and want (short-term desires) systems are retained, but the selection of aspirations is different, and the player can change a Sim's wants on demand using a "Call Therapist" function.

The console version of Pets has a single neighborhood with a downtown or "town square" area, which exclusively contains pet-related businesses. Rather than Simoleons (the usual in-game currency across the series), the town square deals in "Pet Points", which are acquired through fulfilling a pet's wants. As the player earns and spends such points, the town square is upgraded, expanding the businesses located there and the range of objects available in them. Pet Points also allow the player to acquire codes that unlock secret items. There are no non-pet-related businesses or recreational options.

=== Game Boy Advance and Nintendo DS versions ===
Gameplay of the Game Boy Advance version of Pets

The versions of Pets for the Game Boy Advance and Nintendo DS are more structured than on other platforms. The DS version is premised on playing as a veterinarian running an animal hospital, while the GBA version incorporates role-playing game elements.

The DS version of Pets, on account of its premise, has a more direct focus on animal care than other entries. While caring for a Sim and their own pet, the player treats a steady flow of cats and dogs with any one of five diseases. The interactions available are limited compared to the PC game. The game includes both cats and dogs, but their behavior and interaction work the same; Craig Harris, reviewing for IGN, complained that cats "roll over and beg, and fetch a ball with the same animation sequences as the dogs". Pet training is also possible, using a rhythm game-like mechanic where the player completes patterns on-screen to train a trick. The GBA version is loosely structured around training a pet and competing against non-player characters. As Sims earn money, they can buy "trick scrolls" that allow teaching a pet a new trick. The game as a whole is based primarily around formal minigames, including pet walking, training, and competitions.

== Soundtrack ==
The background music for The Sims 2: Pets was composed by Mark Mothersbaugh. As with previous expansion packs, diegetic music was contributed by musicians covering their previous songs in Simlish, the constructed language spoken in-game. The pop rock duo Aly & AJ were one of the first acts announced to appear on the soundtrack; they stated they were "huge fans" of the series and enthused by the opportunity to participate. Other acts featuring on the soundtrack were the Flaming Lips, Brazil (band), the Pussycat Dolls, Hot Chip, Cut Copy, Saving Jane, Skye Sweetnam, and Ralph Myerz and the Jack Herren Band. Stuart Bishop, reviewing the PC version for Computer and Video Games, disparaged the soundtrack and its "mindless inclusion of Simlish covers of Pussycat Dolls songs", positing that Simlish versions of the band's lyrics were an improvement on the real ones.

== Reception and legacy ==
=== PC version ===
The Sims 2: Pets for PC received an aggregate Metascore of 76, indicating positive-leaning reviews. Reviewers praised the pets themselves for their realism and design but criticised the expansion pack's overall lack of content and narrow focus on its subject matter. Multiple writers found the expansion's limited scope disappointing compared to the broader additions of previous expansion packs.

The models, animations, and behaviors of the pets were well-received; Computer and Video Games' Stuart Bishop—in a positive review—called their "needless detail" a surprise. Bishop and IGN's J. Habib both favorably compared Pets to The Sims: Unleashed, a similar expansion pack for the first game. Habib noted Pets' expanded customization, including the ability to create new breeds. Bishop called attention to the game's fluid and naturalistic animations compared to Unleashed, stating that cats and dogs in Pets moved realistically rather than, as he chose to put it, "running only at 90-degree angles like some demented autistic creature".

Pets' markedly narrower scope than prior expansion packs was a subject of discussion. Habib described Pets as "hands-down the least significant and useful of the Sims 2 expansion packs". Charlie Barratt at GamesRadar juxtaposed it with the prior three expansion packs for the game; while University, Nightlife, and Open for Business had made substantial gameplay changes, Pets was more monotonously focused on a single element. Multiple reviewers felt that the expansion was unlikely to appeal to new players.

In 2022, Gabrielle Castania at TheGamer ranked Pets in seventh place out of The Sims 2's eight expansion packs.

=== Console and handheld versions ===
Reviews for the console and handheld versions of Pets were mixed to negative. Metascores for the console games all fall into the "mixed or average" range, ranging from 57 for the PlayStation Portable rendition to 68 on the PlayStation 2. The handheld version of Pets for the Nintendo DS received a Metascore of 49, corresponding to "generally unfavorable" reviews. Pets was considered an improvement over previous console Sims games; Juan Castro at IGN felt it "improves upon its console predecessors in every way imaginable", while reviewers with mixed perceptions on the game as a whole nonetheless praised it compared to previous installments. However, reviewers criticised its limitations compared to the PC game.

Pets for console was unfavorably compared to dedicated virtual pet games; Liam Kavanagh at Eurogamer recommended Nintendogs as a better option for virtual pet players, while a Computer and Video Games staff writer described it as "a variation on Tamagotchi that's been roughly crowbarred into The Sims 2". The game's limitations compared to its PC version were a recurring subject of discussion. Critics described it as "feel[ing] like an expansion pack" and referred to its inability to be built upon the same way as the PC game. A writer for Digital Entertainment News criticised the general concept of console Sims ports due to their inability to become "one very-full-featured master-game", giving the example of a hypothetical Nightlife console port that players would be unable to synergize with Pets.

Reviews for the PSP and GameCube ports drew attention to their limitations. Orry, reviewing for PSP, criticised its frequent loading and lack of multiplayer options. Gamestyle's Andy Lucas praised the GameCube version compared to contemporary releases such as Need for Speed: Underground 2, alongside EA's commitment to the declining platform; nonetheless, he found the game as a whole "competent but uninspired". Mike Wilson's N-Europe GameCube review was strongly negative, disparaging the loading times and controls and stating its inferiority to the PC version "could possibly tarnish your view on future Sims games".

The handheld versions of Pets were poorly-received; GamesRadar stated the DS version "needs to be put down". Reviewers disliked its "mutant, low-poly" graphics; the apparent shortcuts it took, such as cats behaving identically to dogs; and its inferiority to Nintendogs, a similar simulation title focused on pet care. The Game Boy Advance version, while "not quite as dull", still received criticism for its balance issues, lack of personality, and convoluted plot.

== See also ==
- The Sims: Unleashed
- The Sims 2: Apartment Pets
- The Sims Stories § Pet Stories
- The Sims 3 expansion packs § Pets
- The Sims 4 expansion packs § Cats & Dogs
- The Sims 4 game packs § Werewolves
