= The Sims 2: Nightlife =

2005 video game expansion pack

- Developer: Maxis
- Publishers: Electronic Arts (PC); Aspyr Media (Mac)
- Platforms: Windows, Mac OS X
- Release: Windows: NA: September 15, 2005; EU: September 16, 2005; AU: September 19, 2005; Mac OS X April 3, 2006
- Genre: Social simulation
- Mode: Single-player

The Sims 2: Nightlife is an expansion pack for the 2004 life simulation video game The Sims 2, developed by Maxis and published by Electronic Arts. The second expansion pack for the game, it was released September 15, 2005. Nightlife expands the game's social and romantic interactions, introducing elements such as romantic chemistry and a formal dating minigame. It also introduces "downtown" neighborhoods that house community lots such as bars, clubs, and restaurants; changes to the game's handling of objects, including a full inventory system; and new gameplay options, such as the ability to turn Sims into vampires.

Nightlife was inspired by The Sims: Hot Date, a thematically similar expansion for the first game and one of its most popular. Contemporary reviewers made note of its more prurient content compared to the base game; overall reception was mostly positive, but criticised its performance on the systems of the day. It was commercially successful, becoming one of the best-selling games of 2005. Nightlife's themes, supernatural elements, and recurring characters have served as influences for later games in the series.

== Background and development ==
The Sims is a franchise of life simulation games developed by Maxis and published by Electronic Arts. It has sold over 200 million copies amongst all platforms and installments, making it one of the best-selling video game franchises of all time. The Sims 2 was released on September 14, 2004. It expanded upon the original game's features, introducing elements such as an aspiration system based around short-term and long-term goals, expanded character and neighborhood customization, and the ability for Sims to raise families, age, and progress through generations.

All main entries in the series have had multiple expansion packs, which add further gameplay options. Rather than being relatively simple downloadable content, expansion packs for the first three games in the Sims series substantially expanded upon the base game's life simulation; Kieron Gillen, writing for Eurogamer in 2005, stated the first game's expansions "could have been expanded [...] into games of their own" and argued their complexity was a component in why The Sims had few competitors in its genre. Eight expansion packs were released for The Sims 2 between 2005 and 2008.

The Sims 2: Nightlife, the second expansion pack for the game, was foreshadowed upon the release of The Sims 2: University. The back cover of University disclosed the upcoming expansion's name and revealed its first in-game image, "a spiked-haired, nattily dressed man taking the hand of an attractive young woman"—with visible fangs. Nightlife was officially announced in April 2005; an alpha build was previewed at the E3 pre-show that May. It was released on September 15, 2005.

One of the contest-winning outfits included in the game

Nightlife was strongly influenced by The Sims: Hot Date, an expansion for the original Sims game revolving around social and romantic opportunities. Hot Date was one of the first game's most successful expansions, and significant player demand existed for a Sims 2 equivalent. The expansion also aimed to improve the options available outside home lots; while the base game provided the opportunity for Sims to travel to community lots and interact outside of their homes, the designers felt it had failed to provide sufficient incentive for players to engage with such options. Prior to the expansion pack's release, a competition was held for players to create in-game outfits; winners would receive an autographed copy of Nightlife and have their entries included in the finished game. Four winners, two each for male and female outfits, were ultimately selected and included.

== Gameplay ==
The Sims 2: Nightlife alters the base game through both broad-scope changes, such as the introduction of a dedicated "downtown" area composed primarily of community lots, and more complex alterations to how Sims act and react. Nightlife revamps the base game's romantic interactions by introducing a "chemistry" system, where Sims are more or less attracted to each other based on personality, aspiration, and newly introduced "turn-ons" and "turn-offs". Potential turn-ons and turn-offs include hair color, body shape, and supernatural characteristics.

Nightlife introduces a timed and scored dating minigame. A Sim on a date must fulfil as many of their partner's wants (short-term goals set by their aspiration) as possible, while avoiding their fears (which lose aspiration points when fulfilled). If they succeed at fulfilling wants, their date score will increase and their partner will reward them with gifts; should the date fail, they will instead be "rewarded" with flaming bags of fecal matter. A platonic "social outing" system is also introduced, using the same basic mechanics as dates. The dating system is intertwined with Nightlife's expanded recreation options. Sims are able to visit specialized downtown subneighborhoods containing community lots such as bars, clubs, restaurants, and bowling alleys, and dates and outings are intended to occur in such areas.

The Sims 2 has an aspiration system, where Sims have one of five primary life goals (Knowledge, Family, Fortune, Romance, or Popularity) that determine their wants and fears. Nightlife introduces two new aspirations, Pleasure and Grilled Cheese. Pleasure Sims are hedonistic and interested in "the kinds of things downtown offers"; their wants revolve around things such as dining out, going on successful dates, and DJing, while their fears include being rejected for social opportunities. The "socially awkward and nutritionally dicey" Grilled Cheese aspiration can only be acquired from a mishap with a reward object called the ReNuYuSenso Orb that allows Sims to change their aspirations; Grilled Cheese Sims are hyperfixated on the preparation and consumption of grilled cheese sandwiches. They have special interactions such as the ability to cook such sandwiches at any time of day, rather than be restricted to lunch preparation, and to "Talk About Grilled Cheese", which rarely endears them to other Sims.

Nightlife both introduces new objects and alters how players interact with them. It is the first game in the series where Sims are able to drive cars; according to producer Tim LeTourneau, this feature was added primarily for "storytelling" and increasing verisimilitude, rather than as a fundamental change to the game's carpool- and taxi-focused transit. Other objects introduced in the expansion pack include poker tables, bowling alleys, and karaoke machines. Alongside items themselves, Nightlife adds an inventory system where items can be stored in the inventories of individual Sims. Virtually all objects can be stored in inventories, and no limit exists on their number.

Following the introduction of supernatural Sims in University, Nightlife is the first Sims installment to include vampires. Two non-player vampires, known as Grand Vampires, inhabit each downtown and are recognizable by their "classic vampire garb". Sims that befriend the Grand Vampires can ask to be bitten, becoming vampires themselves; these Sims can go on to create more vampires. During the nighttime, vampires' motives (Note: Motives, also known as Needs, are the mechanics for a Sim's basic physiological and psychological requirements. They comprise Hunger, Comfort, Bladder, Energy, Fun, Social, Hygiene, and Environment.) do not decay, relieving them of needs such as eating or sleeping; however, their motives decay during daytime, which becomes rapid enough to kill them quickly if they go outdoors in sunlight. Vampires do not age or cast a reflection in mirrors, and are able to fly (by turning into a bat) rather than walk. Nightlife's vampires are based on a more "classical" aesthetic of vampirism than vampires in The Sims 3 and The Sims 4; writers have described Nightlife vampires as inspired alternately by "medieval" or "Victorian" aesthetics, while the later games have more modern-appearing vampires that lack some of Nightlife's visibly inhuman characteristics, such as blue-tinted skin. Nightlife vampires are able to reproduce, but unlike their counterparts in later games, they do not pass down vampirism as a genetic characteristic. They are also able to be hybridized with other supernatural Sims, such as zombies.

== Soundtrack ==
The soundtrack for The Sims 2: Nightlife is based around remixes of Mark Mothersbaugh's original compositions for the base game. Musicians who worked on the Nightlife soundtrack include Junkie XL, Lemon Jelly, Adam Freeland, and Timo Maas. The game's diegetic music is themed around its community lots; Andrew Park at GameSpot gave the examples of techno in clubs and "goofy oldies tunes" at a retro-themed diner. Randall Roberts at In Sheep's Clothing described the soundtrack as "typified by a strange combination of playfulness and melancholy" and discussed how the series' persistent popularity affected the careers of its artists. During their time together, Lemon Jelly released three EPs that were each limited to 1,000 copies; their presence on the soundtrack had made their earlier releases into collector's items in the years since the game's release.

== Reception and legacy ==
The Sims 2: Nightlife received a positive reception on release; its aggregate Metascore is 76, indicating "generally favorable reviews". Reviewers focused on its expansion of the game's social element, its changes to the aspiration system, and its addition of high-profile new objects such as cars. In the years following its release, Nightlife has been ranked in the upper tiers of expansion packs for the series.

Upon release, Nightlife was a commercial success. It was the seventh-highest-selling game of 2005 in the Entertainment Software Association's annual sales charts and was awarded a Platinum ELSPA Sales Award, indicating at least 300,000 units sold in the United Kingdom. Nightlife was shortlisted for PC Game of the Year in the 2006 Golden Joystick Awards, which was ultimately won by The Elder Scrolls IV: Oblivion.

=== Contemporary reception ===
Contemporary reviews for Nightlife were generally positive. Tim Wapshott at The Times described the expansion as "absorbing fun", while IGN called it a "welcome" addition and an optimistic indication for the future of the game's expansion packs. Andrew Park at GameSpot called it a "fresh coat of paint", though criticised its failure to fix underlying performance issues such as a "sluggish" camera. Writing for Game Chronicles, Mahamari Tsukitaka deemed Nightlife a "substantial improvement" on the base game and compared it to The Sims: Hot Date, a thematically similar expansion for the first game.

Upon release, Nightlife drew attention for its forward attitude towards romance. PC Gamer UK's staff writer said a more accurate name for the expansion would be The Sims: Slutting About. In a review for Eurogamer, Kristan Reed gave an anecdote about an attempt he made at arranging a friends with benefits relationship between two Sims; the attempt collapsed after he attempted to open their relationship, entangling them in a web of jealousy. An IGN staff writer found Nightlife's structured dates "much more pro-active on the player's part" than the base game's social interactions; Park concurred that they add "more focus and goals" to a highly open-ended sandbox game. Peter Cohen, reviewing the expansion's macOS port for Macworld, felt Nightlife's playability was marred by the ease with which Sims form social connections, stating he "found it hard to keep my Sims from developing instant, lasting friendships and romantic connections with everyone they met".

Several reviewers complained about the expansion's performance on contemporary systems. The Sims 2 lacks a true open world, instead considering separate locations disconnected from the home lot and requiring long loading screens during travel. Reed complained that these loading times made it difficult to appreciate the downtown neighborhoods that are the expansion's main attraction, while Karen Chu at 1Up described Nightlife as "a lot of work for flashes of scandalous fun" and PC Gamer UK said it "accurately simulate[s] that 'I can't be bothered to get the bus into town' feeling". Dave Kosak's review in GameSpy complained about bugs, including graphical issues and Sims being stuck in place, but gave an overall positive review.

=== Later reception ===
Nightlife has been positively compared to later expansion packs in the series. Kirsten Morton at Game Rant, who ranked Nightlife the second best expansion pack in the series' history, called it "one for the history books". Her colleague Sophie McEvoy compared it favorably to the thematically similar The Sims 3: Late Night, praising its greater realism and attention to detail. J. Habib at IGN, in a review for the later expansion The Sims 2: Pets, recommended Nightlife over Pets as a more "significant and useful" expansion.

Specific elements of Nightlife that have been compared to their later appearances include vampires, which it portrayed as more inhuman in appearance, less supernaturally powerful, and less "modern" in aesthetic compared to later games. It was also the only game where vampires could easily be hybridized with other supernatural creatures. Another element of Nightlife to recur throughout the series is the Crumplebottom family. Mrs. Crumplebottom, an elderly woman who chides Sims making public displays of affection, is one of the expansion pack's major non-playable characters. Though the Crumplebottom family have appeared in various guises throughout the series, Mrs. Crumplebottom herself is exclusive to Nightlife; Marina DelGreco at Game Rant bemoaned her exclusion from The Sims 4, arguing her addition would increase the challenge of dates at community lots.

== See also ==
- The Sims: Hot Date
- The Sims 3 expansion packs § Late Night
- The Sims 4 expansion packs § Get Together
- The Sims 4 game packs § Vampires
