= The Sims: Vacation =

- Developer: Maxis (Note: Ported to Mac OS X by Westlake Interactive.)
- Publishers: Electronic Arts (PC); Aspyr Media (Mac)
- Platforms: Windows; Mac OS X
- Release: Windows: NA: March 26, 2002; EU: April 5, 2002; Mac OS X: NA: September 5, 2002; EU: October 2002
- Genre: Social simulation
- Modes: Single-player, multiplayer

The Sims: Vacation (titled The Sims: On Holiday in Europe) is a 2002 expansion pack for The Sims developed by Maxis and published by Electronic Arts. The expansion introduces the ability for the player's Sims to take vacations, as well as new social features including interests, daily and lifetime relationships, and new interactions. Vacation was announced by EA in January 2002, following speculation about a vacation-themed fourth expansion to the game, and was shipped in March 2002.

Upon release, Vacation was a commercial success and the highest-selling computer game of 2002 in NPD sales charts. The expansion received generally favorable reviews, with critics praising the new locations and variety of additional objects and activities, whilst critiquing the approach as generally similar to the previous expansion, The Sims: Hot Date, and additional performance issues. The concept of travelling to different areas was later introduced in The Sims 2: Bon Voyage.

== Gameplay ==
Vacation Island features beach, forest and alpine-themed lots for Sims to visit.

Vacation introduces the ability for player Sims to take vacations to a separate area, Vacation Island. Whilst in Vacation Island, Sims are not required to work, have a reduced rate of decay for moods, and have no time limit to return to their home lot. Players can book a vacation at any time by phone, paying a 500 Simoleon fee, and being transported by car to the vacation destination menu for Vacation Island. Players can either travel with all the family members in their lot or select Sims to join that do not live on their home lot. Lots on the island feature camping, beach and winter destinations, with amenities unique to these environments. Lots on Vacation island feature different Sims and content compared to normal neighborhood lots. Randomly-generated non-player Sims not found in the home neighborhood will share the resort with the player, as well as non-interactable service workers and "theme characters" who entertain guests. Players can also freely edit or rebuilt lots on Vacation Island by accessing the pre-built lots in the neighborhood menu.

Once on a lot is selected on Vacation Island, the player can reserve a room by checking in at the concierge desk on the lot, giving them exclusive access to that room and its amenities. The household is charged for every day they are checked in. Other accommodation options include tents and igloos, which can be set up by players. Each lot has a "vacation director" who provides information about the features of the expansion. Sims can buy, find or win souvenir items, which sit in the personal inventory of a Sim during their time on vacation. These items can be acquired from the vacation director, found using a metal detector, or exchanging tickets won from carnival games with a prize booth. Players can sell souvenirs for Simoleons or display them at their home lot. Whilst on vacation, Sims accrue a hidden number named a "vacation score" that measures the activities undertaken by players during a vacation, with Sims receiving a high-value souvenir if they reach a high score.

Vacation also includes and expands upon several social features introduced in the previous expansion, Hot Date. As in Hot Date, Sims have a range of assigned interests, with Vacation providing additional topics and viewable scores that can be manually assigned by players. Sims are able to talk about their interests with others; if these are shared by other Sims, it will provide a boost to daily relationship scores. Players can control conversation topics using the 'change subject' interaction. Similarly as in Hot Date, Vacation also adds a feature that distinguishes between the daily and lifetime relationship scores between Sims. Vacation also introduces a number of new interactions for Sims, particularly focused upon interactions between children, and between adults and children.

== Reception ==
=== Sales ===
Vacation was a commercial success upon release. The expansion was estimated by NPD sales charts as the best-selling computer game of 2002 by units sold, remaining in the first place in sales charts for several months between March and May 2002.

=== Reviews ===
Reception

Aggregate score
Aggregator	Score
Metacritic	75/100

Review scores
Publication	Score
AllGame	3/5
Computer Gaming World	4/5
Game Informer	8/10
GameRevolution	2/5
GameSpot	8/10
GameSpy	80%
GameZone	9.5/10
IGN	8/10
PC PowerPlay	67%

According to review aggregator Metacritic, Vacation received "generally favorable" reviews. Reviewers were generally positive about the game's new locations. Marc Saltzman of PC Gamer described the vacation concept as "great", highlighting the extra scenarios, objects and characters that added an additional layer to the game. The design of the vacation lots was praised, with Andrew Park of GameSpot describing them as "colorful" and "interesting", and Jason Bates of IGN commending the design of the distinctive themes on Vacation Island. Agata Budinska of PC PowerPlay noted the design of the island offered "something for everyone", noting the wide variety of options between camping and luxury accommodation. Elizabeth McAdams of Computer Gaming World also praised the variety of vacation activities on offer.

Critics were also generally positive about other gameplay additions. Several reviewers praised the inclusion of vacation souvenirs as an additional goal for players to complete, and the ability for entire families to visit new lots together. Andrew Park of GameSpot highlighted the light-hearted tone of new animations as "expressive" and "hilarious", particularly the "exaggerated" behaviours of mascots. Carla Harker of GameSpy commended the new interactions for children, describing them as more "real" and "child-like" than those in the original game.

Some reviewers found the expansion to lack significant additions to the game. T.J. Deci of Allgame considered the expansion to focus more on new objects and locations rather than new ways for Sims to interact or develop, describing the new mechanics as "more ephemeral" than anything else. Similarly, Nebojsa Radakovic of Game Revolution critiqued the game's self-contained design that limited items and new Sims to Vacation Island, not significantly changing the way the game fundamentally plays outside the vacation mode. Writing for the New York Times, Charles Herold noted that Vacation indicated the "ungamelike" and parasocial appeal of The Sims, given that consumers sought expansions that did not change the overarching gameplay but expanded the fictitious world their Sims lived within. Other reviewers noted that Vacation was not a new concept and relied on new features already introduced in previous expansions, particularly the inclusion of visitable locations in Hot Date.

Some less positive reviews of Vacation focused on the tedium of managing Sim needs over the vacation mechanics. Describing the expansion as "sorely lacking", Ryan Boyce of Maxim noted the "annoyances" and "endless management" of needs and finances undermined the appeal of the premise. Agata Budinska of PC Powerplay similarly remarked that managing Sims on vacation was "pretty hard work" to maintain Sim needs and funds. Other reviewers noted performance and technical issues after installing the expansion, and that the expansion failed to patch persistent problems with the original game. Carla Harker of GameSpy noted that graphical and gameplay glitches "permeate" the game, observing slow load times, and expressing disappointment that the expansion failed to fix other issues in the game.
