= The Sims 2: Apartment Pets =

2008 video game

- PAL region cover art for DS
- Developer: Full Fat
- Publisher: Electronic Arts
- Series: The Sims
- Platform: Nintendo DS
- Release: NA: August 26, 2008; AU: August 28, 2008; EU: August 29, 2008
- Genres: Life simulation game, God game
- Mode: Single-player

The Sims 2: Apartment Pets is a video game for the Nintendo DS. EA has described as a follow-up to the Nintendo DS version of The Sims 2: Pets. As in the original, it allows a diverse amount of customization, allowing pets to be created in a variety of colors and sizes.

== Story ==
The game begins with your Uncle Bill going on an expedition and leaving you to take care of the apartment. You can also take care of the pets already in the apartment at the beginning of the game. Soon after the game starts, the janitor will tell you about a lost puppy and give it to you until the owner is found. This puppy, along with other pets, will be dropped off by owners and other various characters who ask you to care for them.

== Gameplay ==
The pet spa is a feature in this game. Owners drop off their pets, and you have a limited time frame where you need to cure any ailments they may have. There are three minigames in The Sims: Apartment Pets.

== Reception ==
Reception

Aggregate score
Aggregator	Score
Metacritic	50/100

Review scores
Publication	Score
1Up.com	C+
4Players	20%
GamesRadar+	1/5
GameZone	5.5/10
IGN	4.5/10
Jeuxvideo.com	7/20
NGamer	70%

The game received "mixed" reviews according to the review aggregation website Metacritic. GamesRadar+ gave it overwhelming dislike a month before it was released Stateside.
