= The Sims 2: University =

Expansion pack for The Sims 2

- Developer: Maxis
- Publishers: Electronic Arts (PC); Aspyr Media (Mac)
- Platforms: Windows, Mac OS X
- Release: NA: March 1, 2005; EU: March 11, 2005
- Genre: Social simulation
- Mode: Single-player

The Sims 2: University is an expansion pack for the 2004 life simulation video game The Sims 2, developed by Maxis and published by Electronic Arts. The first expansion pack for the game, it was released on March 1, 2005. University introduces a new "young adult" life stage who live in separate college towns and attend university; with its dormitories, the expansion pack marks the first time in the Sims series where player Sims are able to live with non-player characters. Sims who attend university gain access to new careers and interactions. University also introduces new items, interactions, and gameplay elements, such as the ability to bring deceased Sims back to life, the ability to play musical instruments and use mobile phones, and the ability to turn Sims into zombies.

The concept of a higher education-themed expansion pack had been proposed for the Sims series since the original installment, but it was not deemed technically feasible until The Sims 2. Development focused on bridging the gap between the base game's teenage and adult life stages; young adult Sims have some but not all abilities of adult Sims, and inhabit separate areas of the game to Sims of other life stages.

Upon release, University was a critical and commercial success. It was praised for its depth and complexity, though reviews also noted performance issues and questioned the authenticity of its portrayal of higher education. Critical analysis in the years following its release has considered it one of the best expansion packs in the Sims series and drawn attention to its influence on later games.

== Background and development ==
Just imagine the sheer amount of numbers that go into a simulator as complicated as The Sims 2. It's easy for things to go out of whack. "Oops. I set one number too high, and now Sims do absolutely nothing but talk on cell phones. Forever. Until they die."

— Hunter Howe, GameSpot

The Sims is a franchise of life simulation games developed by Maxis and published by Electronic Arts. It has sold over 200 million copies amongst all platforms and installments, making it one of the best-selling video game franchises of all time. The Sims 2, sequel to the original, was released on September 14, 2004. It expanded upon the original game's features, introducing elements such as an aspiration system based around short-term and long-term goals, expanded character and neighborhood customization, and the ability for Sims to raise families, age, and progress through generations.

All main entries in the series have had multiple expansion packs, which add further gameplay options. Rather than being relatively simple downloadable content, expansion packs for the first three games in the Sims series substantially expanded upon the base game's life simulation; Kieron Gillen, writing for Eurogamer in 2005, stated the first game's expansions "could have been expanded [...] into games of their own" and argued their complexity was a component in why The Sims had few competitors in its genre. Eight expansion packs were released for The Sims 2 between 2005 and 2008.

The Sims 2: University was announced in November 2004 and released for Windows on March 1, 2005, in North America and March 11 in Europe. It was released for macOS that November by Aspyr Media. University was the first expansion pack for the game. The concept of a university expansion pack had been considered during the first game's development, but was not viable until The Sims 2 given the first game's limited support for life stages. According to an interview with the development team, they considered having the classes themselves be the expansion's focus rather than the social experience of university, but decided it would be "a bit boring" and wanted to avoid making "SimHomework, the homework simulator".

According to Charles London, one of the game's designers, its theme was chosen as an attempt to bridge the substantial gap between the base game's teenage and adult life stages. The design team aimed to base gameplay off their personal experiences with higher education, which were greatly varied; London described them as ranging "from buttoned-down Ivy League book-cracking to wild and raucous party-school rampaging". Hunter Howe, another designer, discussed University's design and playtesting experience with GameSpot two weeks prior to its release. He referred to issues such as dormitory-residing Sims being prone to crowding kitchens and dying en masse in the event of kitchen fires, which was eventually solved by adding fire sprinklers. Howe also referred to an early bug making mobile phone use too attractive, causing Sims to use their phones constantly until dying of motive failure, and a number of unusual bugs caused by the game's introduction of zombies, such as "zombies can't fall in love" and "zombies walk on water".

== Gameplay ==
The Sims 2: University introduces higher education to the life simulator sandbox gameplay of The Sims 2. A "young adult" lifestage is introduced between the "teenager" and "adult" life stages, specifically for university students; teenage Sims can age into young adults by being sent to university, or new Sims can be created directly as young adults. Young adult Sims possess characteristics between teenagers and adults, such as being able to woohoo but not become pregnant or impregnate other Sims, and are able to get engaged but not married. They are restricted to living on campus, where they can live in large dormitory residences, Greek houses, or stand-alone homes; University's dormitories are the first time in the Sims series where player Sims are able to live with Sims not controlled by the player, known as "dormies". The portrayal of higher education in University is drawn from higher education in the United States, incorporating both realistic elements of the American college experience and "superficially stereotypical" ones drawn from media portrayals. Multiple elements of the game censored potentially mature real-world themes, such as replacing alcoholic beverages with "juice kegs".

The core gameplay of the expansion pack revolves around completing university semesters. Players must maintain a Sim's class performance in one of eleven majors. The primary mechanisms for maintaining and improving one's grades are attending class, studying, and writing assignments and term players; more unorthodox methods include "influencing" other Sims to complete one's assignments and woohooing with professors. Four new career tracks were introduced in the expansion pack: Artist, Natural Scientist, Paranormal, and Show Business. Access to these career tracks is gated by completion of a university degree. These career tracks are higher-paying than those offered in the base game, while simultaneously having shorter work schedules and placing less strain on a Sim's motives. Other newly introduced elements of University also depend on attendance and graduation, such as new social interactions, being hired at higher career levels, and gaining new want slots, an element of gameplay where Sims can set short-term goals and receive rewards for fulfilling them.

Several non-player characters are introduced in University, in addition to the dormies who serve as roommates for player Sims. These characters can be interacted with like normal Sims, including the option to befriend or romance them. Most NPCs introduced in the expansion pack are based around its theme, including sports team mascots (a "good" llama mascot and an "evil" cow mascot from a rival college), professors, and streakers, who randomly appear and run nude through the room.

Over 125 objects were added to the game in University. Items introduced by the expansion pack include kegs described as "juice kegs", recreational objects such as pool tables and musical instruments, and home décor themed around psychedelia and high fantasy. The expansion pack-exclusive careers also introduce new "career rewards", objects Sims can acquire after reaching a certain career level. University career rewards of note include the Paranormal reward, which can bring deceased Sims back to life, and the Natural Science reward, a "cowplant" based on Audrey II from Little Shop of Horrors; the cowplant can eat Sims, turning them into a "milk" that extends the lifespan of any Sim that drinks it by five days.

University was the first game in the Sims series to introduce occult life states, where previously "human" Sims can be turned into supernatural creatures. The Resurrect-O-Nomitron, a phone line to the Grim Reaper that can bring Sims back from the dead, has the option to bring Sims back as zombies. Zombies have distorted facial features, a distinctive blue skin tone, and altered personalities; they move by shambling and are unable to walk or run normally, and thought bubbles containing brains regularly appear above their heads. Zombies do not age or die of natural causes, and although able to woohoo, they are sterile.

== Soundtrack ==
Background music for The Sims 2: University was composed by Mark Mothersbaugh and Silas Hite. Diegetic music, played on in-game radios and speakers, was composed by a team led by Robi Kauker, the audio director at Maxis. Musicians such as Charlotte Martin and Dexter Freebish participated in the project by covering songs they had previously recorded in Simlish, the constructed language of the Sims universe. Though Maxis had collaborated with the Black Eyed Peas to record Simlish covers for the spinoff game The Urbz: Sims in the City, University marked the first time in the series that a concentrated effort was made to adapt pre-existing songs to Simlish.

The musicians who were recruited for the University soundtrack were intended to be emerging artists, rather than famous ones, in order to lend verisimilitude to the college rock theme. Though Simlish is not a formal constructed language with a vigorous grammar and vocabulary, some Simlish words are translations of English ones; Martin, in her covers for the game, insisted on translating her original English songs to Simlish rather than making up gibberish. Abra Moore, another musician on the University soundtrack, described the experience of adapting her songs as "like jazz for me [...] very liberating creatively". Moore also discussed the complexity of translating works to a language with no real vocabulary, including the risk of unintentionally using words that may be obscene in other languages.

The soundtrack for University was released in a compilation album in November 2005 after Electronic Arts opened a dedicated music division.

== Reception and legacy ==
The Sims 2: University received a positive reception on release; its aggregate Metascore is 81, indicating "generally favorable reviews". Elements discussed by many reviewers included the expansion pack's diversity of options, its representation of the college experience, and how it ran on contemporary systems. In the years following its release, University has been received as one of the best expansions for The Sims 2 and one of the best in the series.

Upon release, University was a commercial success. In the Entertainment Software Association's sales charts for 2005, University was the second highest-selling computer game of the year, behind World of Warcraft and ahead of the Sims 2 base game. It was awarded a Platinum ELSPA Sales Award, indicating at least 300,000 units sold in the United Kingdom.

=== Contemporary reception ===
University was received as a particularly complex expansion; Kieron Gillen, writing for Eurogamer, described University as "probably the most coherent, singular statement of any of the Sims expansions and just shy of being a full game by itself". Brandon Whipple at Mygamer noted its variety of features, particularly calling attention to how its new clothing options included as many for male Sims as female. Writing for Realgamer, Tracy Bosworth appreciated several of the new features, including exercise equipment, musical instruments, and then-contemporary mobile phones, and described the dingy, grungy aesthetic of many new items as appropriate for "a house filled with penniless students". Nonetheless, Scott Osborne at GameSpot found the items and options were overfocused on the expansion pack's theme; he described the university structure as "something of a letdown" and stated the new interior design options were impractical "unless you're creating a swinging bachelor pad for an Austin Powers sim".

The expansion's gameplay was positively received. Osborne called it a successful addition to a "deceptively deep strategy game", while Gillen and Dan Adams at IGN both described it as more structured than the base game with clearer goals. Gillen juxtaposed University's structure with the "aimless progression" that detractors of the series criticised, summarizing the difference between University and base gameplay as "while life doesn't have real failure or success states, exams do".

Like the base game, University received a "Teen" rating from the Entertainment Software Rating Board. Several reviewers commented on how this rating impacted the expansion pack's portrayal of the college experience; Osborne described it as "college as a 12-year-old might imagine it", while Andrew S. Bub at Yahoo Games called it "an idyllic version where things don't get out of hand and the kegs are filled with 'juice'". Reviewers described the game's use of euphemism to avoid a higher rating, such as "juice kegs" and "bubble blowers" that apparently intoxicated Sims.

University's performance on contemporary hardware was the subject of some criticism. The collective living environment of dormitories required the game to load many more Sims at once than would usually occur in the base game; Bub complained this triggered "slow-downs [...] on all but the most powerful PCs", though pointed out that the same would occur during large parties in the base game. Osborne similarly said that while "the dorms are always hopping with activity", this could pose performance problems. Adams referred to the game as having bugs that, while minor, were "certainly strange and a little bit unnerving", such as Sims freezing in place and being unable to move again. Multiple reviewers discussed how the structure of The Sims 2, which lacks a true open world format and instead treats separate locations as independent from normal gameplay, complicated the expansion pack's structure by making it difficult or impractical to regularly travel off-campus and induced long loading times.

=== Later reception ===
In the years following its release, University has remained a subject of critical analysis. In a 2022 ranking of The Sims 2 expansion packs, Gabrielle Castania wrote that it was "almost two decades later, still widely considered the best expansion pack" for the game. She drew attention to elements it introduced that became core to gameplay in later expansions, such as the influence system that allows Sims to manipulate other Sims and the lifetime want system of long-term goals. In the early 2020s, Kirsten Moreton at Game Rant and Jord Tury at Gaming.net both ranked University as the fourth best expansion in the series' history; they referred to its influence on The Sims 3 and The Sims 4, which both introduced popular university-themed expansion packs of their own.

Louisa Ellen Stein, an associate professor of film and media criticism at Middlebury College, discussed University's relevance to fan fiction, machinima, and fandom culture in a chapter for Fan Fiction and Fan Communities in the Age of the Internet. She described it as a tool for expanding the range of stories available in "fannish worlds", permitting the creation of machinima based around "collegefic" and allowing creators to expand their thematic and narrative horizons. J. Sarah Lozano, then a Ph.D. candidate in higher education policy at Indiana University Bloomington, discussed the expansion in an analysis of video game portrayals of higher education. She contrasted the game with "anti-intellectual" media portrayals, stating that University's avoidance of anti-intellectualism "shows developers are capable of avoiding" such elements.

== See also ==
- The Sims 3 expansion packs § University Life
- The Sims 4 expansion packs § Discover University
