= List of best-selling video game franchises =

This is a list of the best-selling video game franchises worldwide, ranked up to 50th place by reported software unit sales. Mario is the best-selling video game franchise of all time, with over 907 million units sold since its first commercial release in 1983. Nintendo, the publisher of Mario, has the most franchises on the list with eight entries.

For this list, sales figures must be directly attributed to a franchise to be included. In instances where overall figures for a franchise are not known but sales of a single game within that franchise are, sales for that game will be attributed to the franchise. Sales of expansion packs and episodic video games are included. Metrics such as "players" or "installs" are not listed as they typically refer to user engagement rather than sales; even for paid games, these metrics could include free trials or other free promotions and cannot reliably be substituted for sales figures.

The listed publisher correspond to each franchise's most recent release, and release years refer only to the first commercial launch, excluding any pre-release stages. Rankings serve solely for numbering purposes and are not meant to be precise, reflecting the list's limited scope because there is no credible, comprehensive sales-tracking source for the video game industry, unlike for films, which have box office tracking sites such as Box Office Mojo and The Numbers. Tied ranks are resolved using the standard competition ranking method, in which entries with equal figures share the same rank and following ranks are increased based on the number of tied entries.

Overview of best-selling video game franchises
Rank	Franchise	Sales (millions)	Genre(s)	Debut year	Publisher(s)	Ref.
1	Mario (Note: The Mario franchise consists of many sub-series, including Super Mario (430 million), Mario Kart (159 million), and Mario Party (60 million). These sub-series accumulated enough sales to be listed in the top 50, but are grouped into the main series.)	907.7	Platformer; Various	1983	Nintendo	
2	Tetris	520	Puzzle	1988 (Note: The release date of the first Tetris games sold commercially. Earlier games were given out for free.)	Various (Note: Tetris does not have a primary publisher. It is licensed by the Tetris Company.)	
3	Pokémon	515	Creature collector; role-playing	1996	Nintendo / The Pokémon Company	
4	Call of Duty	500	First-person shooter	2003	Activision	
5	Grand Theft Auto	480	Action-adventure	1997	Rockstar Games	
6	Minecraft (Note: Sales for the Minecraft franchise are attributed to the 2011 game. A figure for the overall franchise is not known.)	425	Sandbox; survival	2011	Mojang Studios	
7	FIFA	325	Sports; football	1993	Electronic Arts	
8	Assassin's Creed	250	Action-adventure	2007	Ubisoft	
9	Resident Evil	218	Action-adventure; survival horror	1996	Capcom	
10	Final Fantasy	215	Role-playing	1987	Square Enix	
11	Wii (Note: Wii Sports (2006) was bundled with the Wii console in all regions except Japan. Nintendo includes those bundles in the overall sales figure.)	204	Simulation	2006	Nintendo	
12	Lego (Note: The Lego franchise consists of many sub-series, including Lego Star Wars (50 million). This sub-series accumulated enough sales to be listed in the top 50, but is grouped into the main series.)	200	Various	1995	Warner Bros. Games	
12	The Sims	200	Social simulation	2000	Electronic Arts	
14	NBA 2K	175	Sports; basketball	1999	2K	
15	The Legend of Zelda	150	Action-adventure	1986	Nintendo	
15	Madden NFL	150	Sports; American football	1988	Electronic Arts	
15	Need for Speed	150	Racing	1994	Electronic Arts	
18	Sonic the Hedgehog	140	Platformer; kart racing	1991	Sega	
19	Monster Hunter	132	Action role-playing	2004	Capcom	
20	Red Dead	118	Action-adventure	2004	Rockstar Games	
21	Pro Evolution Soccer	112.5	Sports; football	1995	Konami	
22	Star Wars (Note: Sales for the Star Wars franchise are attributed to games published by Electronic Arts and the Lego Star Wars sub-series. A figure for the overall franchise is not known. The aforementioned sub-series has accumulated enough sales to be listed in the top 50 (50 million), but is grouped into the main series.)	102	Action-adventure; Various	1982	Various (Note: The Star Wars franchise is licensed to multiple publishers, including Electronic Arts and Warner Bros. Games.)	(Note: Star Wars franchise sales: Published by Electronic Arts – 52 million; Lego Star Wars – 50 million)
23	Mortal Kombat	100	Fighting	1992	Warner Bros. Games	
23	Tomb Raider	100	Action-adventure	1996	Various (Note: Tomb Raider does not have a primary publisher. It is owned by Embracer Group.)	
23	Gran Turismo	100	Racing	1997	Sony Interactive Entertainment	
23	Bejeweled	100	Puzzle; tile-matching	2000	Electronic Arts	
23	Borderlands	100	First-person shooter	2009	2K	
23	Dragon Quest	100	Role-playing	1986	Square Enix	
29	Tamagotchi	98.1	Virtual pet	1996	Bandai	
30	WWE 2K	98	Sports; professional wrestling	2000	2K	
31	The Witcher	90	Action role-playing	2007	CD Projekt	
31	Just Dance	90	Rhythm; dance	2009	Ubisoft	
33	Battlefield	88.7	First-person shooter	2002	Electronic Arts	
34	Donkey Kong	82	Platformer	1981	Nintendo	
35	Halo	81	First-person shooter	2001	Xbox Game Studios	
36	Civilization	80	Strategy	1991	2K	
36	The Walking Dead	80	Adventure	2012	Telltale Games / Skybound Games	
38	Worms	75	Turn-based tactics; artillery	1995	Team17	
39	Super Smash Bros.	72	Platform fighter	1999	Nintendo	
39	Counter-Strike	72	First-person shooter	2000	Valve	
41	Animal Crossing	70	Social simulation	2001	Nintendo	
42	Metal Gear	66.1	Action-adventure; stealth	1987	Konami	
43	God of War	66	Action-adventure	2005	Sony Interactive Entertainment	
44	The Oregon Trail	65	Strategy	1971	Gameloft	
44	The Elder Scrolls (Note: Sales for The Elder Scrolls franchise are attributed to The Elder Scrolls V: Skyrim. A figure for the overall franchise is not known.)	65	Action role-playing	1994	Bethesda Softworks	
46	Tekken	61	Fighting	1994	Bandai Namco Entertainment	
47	Street Fighter	60	Fighting	1987	Capcom	
47	Far Cry	60	First-person shooter	2004	Ubisoft	
49	Kirby	50	Platformer	1992	Nintendo	
49	Hitman	50	Stealth	2000	IO Interactive	
49	Metro	50	Shooter	2010	Deep Silver	
49	Destiny	50	First-person shooter	2014	Bungie	
49	Overwatch (Note: Sales for the Overwatch franchise are attributed to the 2016 game, as the 2023 game went free-to-play. A figure for the overall franchise is not known.)	50	First-person shooter	2016	Blizzard Entertainment	
49	Marvel's Spider-Man	50	Action-adventure	2018	Sony Interactive Entertainment	

== See also ==
- List of video game franchises
- List of best-selling video games
- List of best-selling game consoles
- List of highest-grossing media franchises
