= The Sims Bustin' Out =

2003 video game

- North American Xbox cover art
- Developer: Maxis (Note: Game Boy Advance version developed by Griptonite Games; N-Gage version developed by Ideaworks3D.)
- Publisher: EA Games
- Designer: Sean Baity
- Writer: Sean Baity
- Composer: Jerry Martin
- Series: The Sims
- Platforms: Game Boy Advance, GameCube, PlayStation 2, Xbox, N-Gage
- Release: Game Boy Advance, GameCube, PS2, Xbox: NA: December 16, 2003; EU: December 19, 2003; AU: February 27, 2004; JP: February 29, 2004 (as The Sims); N-Gage: EU: May 10, 2004; NA: May 12, 2004; JP: May 23, 2004
- Genre: Social simulation
- Modes: Single-player, multiplayer

The Sims Bustin' Out is a 2003 social simulation video game developed by Maxis and published by Electronic Arts for the Game Boy Advance, GameCube, PlayStation 2 and Xbox, with a port for the N-Gage following in 2004. It is the second title in The Sims console series, and the first title not to be concurrently released for Microsoft Windows.

The game features the same 3D environment and engine as the original Sims game, but adds several features from the expansion packs Livin' Large, House Party, Hot Date, and Superstar. As the title suggests, Sims can get out of the house to visit other locations, such as Shiny Things Lab or Casa Caliente. There are two modes: Bust Out Mode, which has mission-based gameplay, and Freeplay Mode, which is open-ended gameplay much like the original Sims game. The PlayStation 2 version once featured the option to play online; it was shut down on August 1, 2008, the same day The Sims Online shut down.

The Game Boy Advance and N-Gage version has its own storyline. The Game Boy Advance and Nintendo DS version of The Urbz: Sims in the City, released in 2004, serves as a sequel to this version.

== Gameplay ==
In the console version, Malcolm Landgraab is going around his neighborhood, stealing items in return for unpaid rent. The player's objective is to complete each career track, unlock and buy back everyone's many possessions, and become rich enough to evict Malcolm from his mansion and move their own Sim in. Furnishing items are unlocked through the completion of different objectives. Aside from the objectives, gameplay is similar to previous Sims titles.

The Game Boy Advance (GBA) and N-Gage version puts the player's Sim in "SimValley" for a summer holiday. Like the console version, GBA/N-Gage version gameplay is objective-based – every time the player completes a series of tasks, the game progresses. In this game, there are no furnishing objects to unlock. Instead, the player must complete all tasks to unlock new houses. Deviating from the "point-and-click" selection process used in every previous Sims title, this version allows the user to control their Sim directly, using the GBA's directional pad. In these versions, new mini-games (jobs for the Sims) are unlocked progressively when certain tasks are done. The GBA and N-Gage versions are largely the same, but the N-Gage version has an exclusive feature that allows Sims to collect three cartridges from various locations and play classic games such as Snake on the Sims' mobile phone.

In both versions, there are various locations that Sims may visit throughout the course of the game. As Sims advance through the game, new areas become accessible.

=== Online features ===
The PlayStation version of Bustin' Out featured a free online play mode titled "Online Weekend". This mode allowed players to participate in both freeplay and storymode with each other and chat using the USB keyboard on the PlayStation 2. The server for the game shut down on August 1, 2008, the same day The Sims Online was shut down, rendering the game impossible to play online.

== Development and release ==
Bustin' Out was announced by EA at E3 in May 2003. Intended as a "bigger and better" sequel to the 2003 console port of The Sims, Maxis project designer Mike Perry stated that Bustin' Out was created to build on player feedback from the previous port, aiming to introduce "a bigger world to explore" by expanding the number of locations and integrating better multiplayer features. Design of the port also aimed to introduce better console and multiplatform features, integrating the online functionality of the PlayStation 2, Link Cable features between GameCube and GBA versions of the game, and HDTV support for the Xbox. Development of a handheld version of Bustin' Out was developed from March 2003, with Maxis engaging Seattle developer Griptonite Games to implement the game to the GBA. Producer Virginia McArthur stated that the design approach aimed to retain the "signature look and feel" of The Sims, whilst exploring new features unique to handheld play, including direct control of sim movement, close-up social interactions, and a stores and auction system. A version of Bustin' Out for the N-Gage was announced by Nokia and EA in January 2004.

== Reception ==
=== Sales ===
The PlayStation 2 version of Bustin' Out received a "Platinum" sales award from the Entertainment and Leisure Software Publishers Association (ELSPA), indicating sales of at least 300,000 units in the UK.

=== Reviews ===
Reception

Aggregate score
Aggregator	Score				
Aggregator	GBA	GameCube	N-Gage	PS2	Xbox
Metacritic	79/100	81/100	78/100	81/100	81/100

Review scores
Publication	Score				
Publication	GBA	GameCube	N-Gage	PS2	Xbox
Electronic Gaming Monthly	7/10	8.83/10	N/A	8.83/10	8.83/10
Eurogamer	N/A	7/10	N/A	7/10	7/10
Famitsu	27/40	N/A	N/A	32/40	N/A
Game Informer	8.5/10	9/10	8.25/10	9.25/10	N/A
GamePro	4/5	4/5	4/5	4/5	4/5
GameRevolution	N/A	B	N/A	B	B
GameSpot	8.1/10	8.3/10	7.4/10	8.3/10	8.3/10
GameSpy	4/5	4.5/5	3/5	4.5/5	4.5/5
GameZone	8.4/10	8.6/10	7.9/10	8.2/10	7.8/10
IGN	8/10	8.2/10	7/10	8/10	8/10
Nintendo Power	4.2/5	4.3/5	N/A	N/A	N/A
Official Xbox Magazine (US)	N/A	N/A	N/A	N/A	8.9/10

Bustin' Out received "favorable" reviews on all platforms according to the review aggregation website Metacritic.

==== Console ====
Reviewers generally praised the overarching premise of Bustin' Out. Several reviews noting that the game's focus on career progression added challenge to the game against the balance of managing sim needs. GamePro considered the gameplay loop of Bustin Out to be "marginally successful", praising its pacing and goal-oriented gameplay but noting that a single-character approach contrasted with the design of The Sims.

Many reviews discussed the new ability for players to see sims travel between lots. Thierry Nguyen of Official PlayStation Magazine characterised the feature as a "huge gameplay change" with the variety of lots to live in adding replayability to the game. Tom Bramwell of Eurogamer commended the "wonderful variety" of people and places to visit, and the increasing scale of the game's locations "from boring to exotic". Mary Jane Irwin of IGN critiqued the travel mechanics, describing them as an "active load screen" due to the inability to see the map or alter any aspect other than the selected destination.

Critics were divided on the game's visual presentation and performance. Andrew Park of GameSpot highlighted the "colourful" and "simple" visual design of the game. Some multiplatform reviewers noted uneven performance between versions, with the Xbox having a better presentation and performance overall. Tom Bramwell of Eurogamer found the game's presentation to be slightly dated and exhibit "ropey" performance, lacking transition animations and close-up details. GamePro described the graphics as "slightly sloppy". Mary Jane Irwin of IGN found the visuals to be serviceable but "not outstanding" and broadly similar to the previous year's port.

Critics were also mixed on the standalone merits of the game in as a revision of the port of The Sims released the previous year. Thierry Nguyen of PlayStation Magazine described the game as a "perfect sequel" due to correcting the weakness of the previous game, adding new features, and maintaining the core vision of the series. Andrew Park of GameSpy considered the game to have made "solid improvements" on its predecessor due to the additional gameplay features. Tom Bramwell of Eurogamer found Bustin Out to be "more or less the same" as the many "expansions and reworkings" of the franchise's basic formula. GamePro similarly described it as no more than an "extension" to the original game. Mary Jane Irwin of IGN noted the game lacked new features and did not introduce "revolutionary" changes to the series.

==== Handheld ====
The Times gave the N-Gage version all five stars, saying, "The graphics are sublime, though this scaled-down version does have its limitations: there are, for example, no 'Simspeak' exchanges since the conversations are all text-based. Still, Bustin' Out should help to broaden the appeal of the nGage." The Village Voice gave the PlayStation 2 version a score of nine out of ten, saying, "The devil's in the details ... mundane or fun, everything recedes into a heartbeat of flushing, snoring, and Simlish." Advance noted that the game was not a "faithful conversion" of The Sims due to being "substantially cut down" in features, comparing it more closely to the Harvest Moon series.

=== Accolades ===
Bustin' Out was awarded "Console Family Game of the Year" at the AIAS' 7th Annual Interactive Achievement Awards.
