= Gerri Lawlor =

American actress (1969–2019)

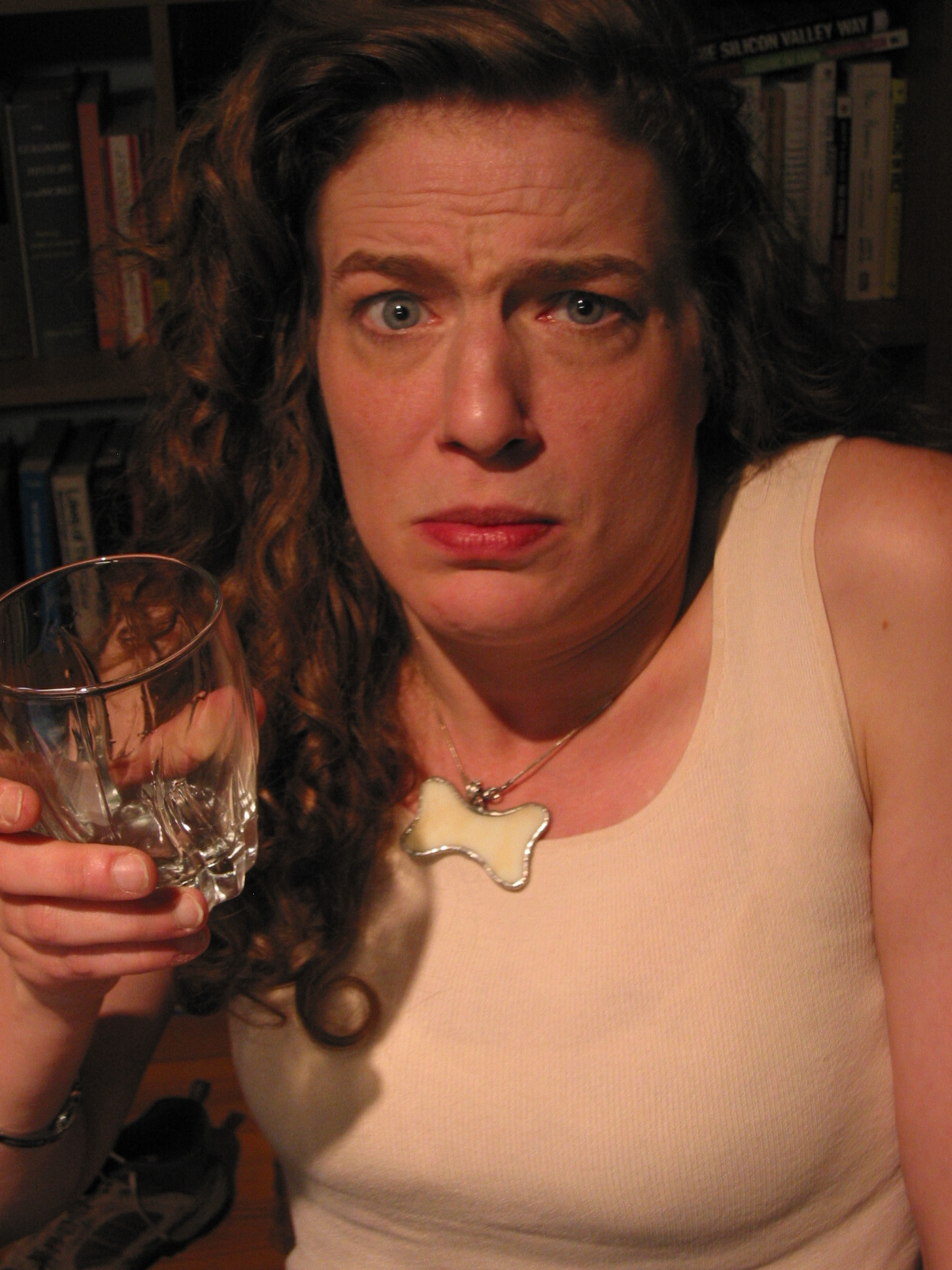
- Lawlor in 2008
- Born: May 16, 1969
- Died: January 28, 2019 (aged 49)
- Occupations: Film, voice actress
- Years active: 1994–2018
- Known for: Developing Simlish

Gerri Lee Lawlor (May 16, 1969 – January 28, 2019) was an American actress, voice actress and homeless advocate. She was the co-creator, along with Marc Gimbel and Stephen Kearin, of the fictitious Simlish language used in The Sims.

Lawlor was the voice of numerous Sims in The Sims, The Sims Livin' Large, The Sims: House Party, The Sims Makin' Magic, The Sims 2, The Sims Life Stories, The Sims: Superstar, and SimCity 4.

Lawlor played the "Vanna White" hostess in the 3DO game Twisted.

In her spare time, Lawlor was a homeless advocate. In the #BeRobin campaign of 2014, Lawlor performed improvised music and comedy on the street to raise money for the homeless with Margaret Cho. Some of those performances appeared in the 2016 documentary #BeRobin The Movie by Kurt Weitzmann.

Lawlor starred as Elizabeth Goodman in the deconstructive comedic film Suckerfish in 1999. She was the voice of "The Bully" in the Annie Award-winning animated short Hubert's Brain.

Lawlor was a Company Player at BATS Improv.

Between 2006 - 2007 and in 2011, Gerri Lawlor worked closely as a female vocalist for the anonymous art collective The Residents.

Lawlor died suddenly on January 28, 2019, from causes that have not been disclosed.

== Filmography ==
From IMDB
| Year | Title | Director / Game Studio | Role |
|---|---|---|---|
| 1994 | Twisted: The Game Show | Jim Eisenstein / Studio 3DO | Hannah |
| 1999 | Suckerfish | Brien Burroughs | Elizabeth Goodman |
| 2000 | The Sims | Will Wright / Maxis & Edge of Reality | Sim (voice and whistling) |
| 2000 | The Sims Livin' It Up | Will Wright / Maxis & Edge of Reality | Sim (voice and whistling) |
| 2001 | The Sims: House Party | Will Wright / Maxis & Edge of Reality | Sim (voice and whistling) |
| 2001 | Hubert's Brain | Phil Robinson & Gordon Clark | The Bully |
| 2001 | Wet Hot American Summer | David Wain | Whistling Woman, Uncredited |
| 2003 | SimCity 4 | Will Wright / Maxis | Sim |
| 2003 | Security | Brien Burroughs | Actress |
| 2003 | The Sims: Superstar | Will Wright / Maxis | Sim |
| 2003 | SimCity 4: Rush Hour | Will Wright / Maxis | Sim |
| 2003 | The Sims Makin' Magic | Will Wright / Maxis | Sim |
| 2004 | The Sims 2 | Will Wright / Maxis Redwood Shores | Adult Female Sim 1 |
| 2005 | The Sims 2: University | Will Wright / Maxis Redwood Shores | Adult Female Sim 1 |
| 2006 | The Sims 2: Open for Business | Will Wright / Maxis Redwood Shores | Sim |
| 2006 | The Sims 2: Pets | Will Wright / Maxis Redwood Shores | Sim |
| 2007 | Limbo | Mitch Temple | Piffy |
| 2007 | Orange #8 | Leonardo D'Antoni | The Piffy / Piccolo Player |
| 2008 | The Council | Brien Burroughs | City Clerk |
| 2010 | Telephone: The Office Version | Peter Furia | Phone Licker |
| 2011 | Tower Heist | Brett Ratner | Performer on 'Stars And Stripes Forever March' |
| 2015 | #BeRobin the Movie | Kurt Weitzmann | Self |
| 2018 | Billionaire Boys Club | James Cox | Performer on 'Someone To Watch Over Me' |
