= The Sims 4 expansion packs =

2014 video game expansion pack list

- Genre: Life simulation
- Developer: Maxis
- Publisher: Electronic Arts
- Platforms: Microsoft Windows macOS; PlayStation 4 Xbox One
- First release: The Sims 4: Get to Work; March 31, 2015
- Latest release: The Sims 4: Royalty & Legacy; February 12, 2026

Aggregate review scores
Game	Metacritic
Get to Work	73/100
Get Together	72/100
City Living	78/100
Cats & Dogs	80/100
Seasons	81/100
Get Famous	77/100
Island Living	84/100
Discover University	81/100
Eco Lifestyle	82/100
Snowy Escape	80/100
Cottage Living	80/100
High School Years	74/100
Growing Together	82/100
Horse Ranch	68/100
For Rent	67/100
Lovestruck	71/100
Life & Death	86/100
Businesses & Hobbies	70/100
Enchanted by Nature	74/100
Adventure Awaits	75/100
Royalty & Legacy	75/100

Twenty-one expansion packs have been released for the 2014 life simulation video game The Sims 4, the fourth major title in The Sims series. Developed by Maxis and published by Electronic Arts, the expansion packs were released for Microsoft Windows, macOS, PlayStation 4, and Xbox One, with later console compatibility on PlayStation 5 and Xbox Series X/S. Expansion packs are the largest form of paid downloadable content for The Sims 4 and usually add a major gameplay system, a themed selection of objects and clothing, and often a new world or life state. The first expansion pack, Get to Work, was released on March 31, 2015. The most recent expansion pack, Royalty & Legacy, was released on February 12, 2026.

== Overview ==
No.	Expansion pack	Release date	New world	Major additions
1	Get to Work	March 31, 2015	Magnolia Promenade	Active careers, retail businesses, aliens
2	Get Together	December 8, 2015	Windenburg	Clubs, cafés, dancing, DJ mixing
3	City Living	November 1, 2016	San Myshuno	Apartments, penthouses, festivals, semi-active careers
4	Cats & Dogs	November 10, 2017	Brindleton Bay	Cats, dogs, Create-a-Pet, veterinary clinics
5	Seasons	June 22, 2018	None	Weather, seasons, holidays, gardening career
6	Get Famous	November 16, 2018	Del Sol Valley	Fame, reputation, acting career, media production
7	Island Living	June 21, 2019	Sulani	Mermaids, conservation, beach and ocean activities
8	Discover University	November 15, 2019	Britechester	Degrees, university housing, organizations, robotics
9	Eco Lifestyle	June 5, 2020	Evergreen Harbor	Eco footprint, neighborhood action plans, fabrication
10	Snowy Escape	November 13, 2020	Mt. Komorebi	Winter sports, lifestyles, sentiments, mountain excursions
11	Cottage Living	July 22, 2021	Henford-on-Bagley	Farming, errands, cows, llamas, chickens, village fairs
12	High School Years	July 28, 2022	Copperdale	Active high school, prom, teen aspirations, social app
13	Growing Together	March 16, 2023	San Sequoia	Infant and family gameplay, milestones, compatibility
14	Horse Ranch	July 20, 2023	Chestnut Ridge	Horses, ranch animals, nectar making, equestrian events
15	For Rent	December 7, 2023	Tomarang	Residential rentals, property ownership, tenant events
16	Lovestruck	July 25, 2024	Ciudad Enamorada	Dating app, romance dynamics, romantic boundaries
17	Life & Death	October 31, 2024	Ravenwood	Funerals, bucket lists, ghost powers, Reaper career, rebirth
18	Businesses & Hobbies	March 6, 2025	Nordhaven	Small businesses, tattooing, pottery, custom tattoos
19	Enchanted by Nature	July 10, 2025	Innisgreen	Fairies, apothecary, ailments, natural living
20	Adventure Awaits	October 2, 2025	Gibbi Point	Getaways, custom venues, outdoor activities
21	Royalty & Legacy	February 12, 2026	Ondarion	Nobility, dynasties, prestige, unity, scandals

== Get to Work ==
The Sims 4: Get to Work is the first expansion pack, announced on February 4, 2015. It was released in North America on March 31, 2015, and Europe on April 2, 2015. It includes three active careers: Detective, Doctor, and Scientist, as well as the ability to run a retail business. The pack also features a new neighborhood called Magnolia Promenade, which is pre-populated with lots for Sims to shop at. It includes elements from The Sims 2: Open for Business and The Sims 3: Ambitions.

=== Gameplay and development ===
==== World ====
Get to Work includes a standalone neighborhood, Magnolia Promenade. Magnolia Promenade is not a full world, and contains four lots, three of which have pre-built stores, and one empty lot that the player can build their own business on. Get to Work also includes a secret lot called "Sixam" (which is "Maxis" spelled backwards), which can be found using the wormhole generator, available at level 10 of the new Scientist career.

==== Active careers ====
Get to Work introduces new active careers, which are the main focus of the expansion. These careers give the player an opportunity to follow Sims to work. When the player is following a Sim in their workplace, the player is given tasks that are needed to be completed in order to have a promotion. There are three active careers: Detective, Doctor and Scientist.

The tasks assigned to the player must be completed successfully to improve job performance and gain promotions; each active career has its own task set. In the detective career, Sims must solve crimes by going to a crime scene and collecting clues, in order to catch the suspect, then interrogating them and sending them to jail. In the Doctor career, Sims must cure patients that are gathering up in the lobby by running tests, making diagnoses after collecting enough evidence, and performing surgeries at higher career levels. In the Scientist career, Sims can create crazy potions, gadgets, and even a wormhole generator that Sims can use to explore Sixam.

==== Retail business ====
In Get to Work, Sims can once again have their own retail businesses. After a Sim purchases a residential or vacant lot for their retail business, they will travel to that lot. While they are on the retail lot, players have two options to manage the store. The simplest way of managing the store is through the "Owned Business Panel" located in the bottom right of the UI, next to the motives panel. From this panel, players can manage a Sim's retail store as they would with a cash register. The business panel shows each lot's name, whether it is open or closed, and number of hours opened for.

Customers will enter the lot and will walk to an object or mannequin that interests them, with a bar above their head that showcases their interest to buy. When the bar fills, the customer decides to purchase the item and an employee or the owner can ring them up. There is a variety of retail businesses such as a photo gallery, bakery, book store, or clothing shop. Shops can sell practically almost any buyable item.

==== Aliens ====
Sim-like playable aliens return in Get to Work. Aliens are similar to those in previous games, though there are a few differences. For example, they appear roughly the same as before, but glow slightly when feeling strong emotions. A notable exception is that they now have multiple skin tones, including blue, green and purple. They wear either a black, green, or grey body suit. Aliens can also wear normal Sim clothing.

Aliens have exclusive interactions not available to normal Sims. They can analyze personalities, empathize, erase minds and disguise themselves to look like normal Sims. At any time, players can edit and adjust how an alien will look while disguised. While disguised, an alien can appear like a normal Sim and not be spotted by Sims. If a Sim figures out the alien is in disguise, the alien can erase the Sim's mind and go about their day pretending to be a normal Sim.

Aliens can be created from the Create-a-Sim menu. This is similar to the "Supernatural Type" selector from The Sims 3: Supernatural. From Create-a-Sim, players can choose from a range of alien face presets, unique eyes, and a range of skin tones such as blue, purple and green. They can also adjust the pointy ears. There is also a range of alien-like makeup which can also be used by normal Sims.

==== Music ====
The expansion pack features songs re-recorded in the fictional Simlish language, including:

- "The Business of Emotion" from the album 2.0 by Big Data
- "Everywhere I Go (Kings & Queens)" from the album Vikings by New Politics
- "Nothing's Wrong" from the album Talking Dreams by Echosmith
- "Whistle (While You Work It)" by Katy Tiz

=== Reception ===
Get to Work received a score of 73/100 from review aggregator Metacritic, indicating "mixed or average reviews". GameZone described Get to Work as a "decent expansion that adds new, unique experiences to The Sims 4's gameplay". Digital Spy criticized the Detective career, describing it as "limited and repetitive", however he praised the other two careers.

== Get Together ==
The Sims 4: Get Together is the second expansion pack, released in North America on December 8, 2015, and Europe on December 10, 2015. It includes a new old-European-themed world inspired by Germany and Norway called Windenburg where Sims can go to night clubs, new spots and many new locations as well as new hangouts, clubs, more activities, cafés, and new interactions. The theme is similar to The Sims: Hot Date, The Sims 2: Nightlife, The Sims 2: FreeTime, and The Sims 3: Late Night.

=== Gameplay and development ===
==== World ====
Get Together includes Windenburg, a new world that is based on a Northern European style village. It contains several social clubs and hotspots that offer several fun activities for Sims to do. Windenburg has a total of 27 lots.

==== Clubs ====
Get Together introduces a new feature called clubs, which work similarly to social groups in The Sims 3: University Life. There are various pre-made clubs to choose from and Sims can create their own club in which up to 8 Sims can join, and manage them with complete freedom.

Players can create a club in which the selected Sim will become the leader. The player can choose the club's name, club symbol, description and requirements for Sims who join the club. After this, the player can select what activities club members can do, a preferred club activity and an activity which club members are not supposed to do. This can all be customized from a menu that pops up when creating a club.

==== Music ====
The expansion pack features songs re-recorded in the fictional Simlish language, including:

- "Beautiful Now" by Zedd
- "Expensive" from the album Unbreakable Smile by Tori Kelly
- "Run Away with Me" by Carly Rae Jepsen
- "Wake Up" by The Vamps

== City Living ==
The Sims 4: City Living is the third expansion pack, released in North America on November 1, 2016, and Europe on November 3, 2016. It includes three new careers: Politician, Social Media, and Critic. The pack also features a new world called San Myshuno where new venues (penthouses, art center, central park, karaoke bar and apartments) are located. It takes elements from The Sims 2: Apartment Life and The Sims 3: Late Night.

=== Gameplay and development ===
==== World ====
City Living features a new city world named San Myshuno. It is heavily based on a variety of modern cities from around the world like Tokyo, San Francisco, and New York City, and also features elements of Indian, Chinese, Japanese and Moroccan culture throughout the city. San Myshuno has a total of 18 lots with 21 apartment units.

==== Apartments and penthouses ====
A total of twenty-one apartment units are available in San Myshuno. Multiple apartments can exist in the same building, along with multiple families and households. Apartment interiors can be heavily modified, but exteriors are not editable.

Apartments offer new gameplay compared to normal residential lots, such as landlords, paying rent, various types of pests and close quarter neighbors. Sims in an apartment complex can knock on the door to yell about noise, they can enter another apartment within the complex, albeit through a loading screen, and then see the other apartment and chat with their neighbor. Sims can give trusted Sims the key to their apartment, allowing those Sims to walk into the household apartment anytime they like.

Apartments in San Myshuno also have pre-selected lot traits in them, that can be modified by the player. However, some apartments have special locked traits that can't be removed. This is because some shells have objects (or pests) in them that require these specific traits.

A total of three penthouses are available in San Myshuno. They are placed on top of decorative buildings that do not have any limitations beyond their lot size, so they can be demolished and rebuilt, much like other buildings on a normal lot. Sims in penthouses can't have neighbors as only one household can live in them, making penthouses very private. However, other Sims are able to visit penthouses by using the elevator.

Living on a penthouse lot is not very different from living on a normal lot, but in order to make the penthouse work, the player needs to add an elevator, a recycle bin, and a mailbox. A community lot penthouse also needs an elevator so that Sims can travel up and down the building. Other Sims will visit these lots the same way as they visit normal community lots in other worlds.

==== Festivals ====
In City Living, Sims can now attend different festivals. There are five festivals: Geekcon, Humor and Hijinks Festival, Romance Festival, Spice Festival and Flea Market that take place around the different districts of San Myshuno over the course of a two-week cycle.

In apartment buildings there is a bulletin board, where Sims can read about the festival to see when the next festival is going to take place and what activities, competitions, and schedules this festival has to offer. Festivals can also be read about on dynamic signs located in different parts of San Myshuno.

When a festival is about to begin, an identifying jingle will play and a notification will appear letting players know that the festival is about to begin. This notification also can be used to teleport Sims to these festivals, if they are located in another neighborhood. Festival objects and activities will appear in the neighborhood where the festival is located in, and disappear when the festival has ended.

==== Careers ====
City Living introduces three new careers: Critic, Politician, and Social Media. Each career track has two career branches. These careers include interactive career assignments, where Sims in these careers have job tasks that take them to various locations around their world.

If a Sim works in one of these three careers, an hour before the Sim is going to work, an alarm notification will appear on the phone. There the player can choose to either "Go to Work", "Work from Home" or "Take the Day Off".

If the player chooses to work from home, the game will generate two randomized tasks for the Sim to complete, in order to gain boost to their job performance that is added to the payment received when the day is over. If these tasks are not done by the Sim they were assigned to, the boss will be disappointed and job performance will be lost.

==== Music ====
The expansion pack features songs re-recorded in the fictional Simlish language, including:

- "Stop Desire" from the album Love You to Death by Tegan & Sara
- "Not What I Needed" from the album Teens of Denial by Car Seat Headrest

== Cats & Dogs ==
The Sims 4: Cats & Dogs is the fourth expansion pack, released on November 10, 2017. On July 31, 2018, Cats & Dogs was released for the Xbox One and PS4. It features a new world called Brindleton Bay and adds cats and dogs into the game. It also allows players to create their own veterinary practice and to pursue a veterinary career. It borrows elements from The Sims: Unleashed, The Sims 2: Pets and The Sims 3: Pets.

=== Gameplay and development ===
==== World ====
Cats & Dogs includes Brindleton Bay, a new world that is based on typical New England seafront towns. It is a big coastal town surrounded by beaches and various pets related activities. Brindleton Bay has a total of 16 lots.

==== Cats and dogs ====
In Cats & Dogs, Sims can own cats and dogs as pets, which are the main feature of the expansion pack. Unlike previous games, pets cannot be controlled by the player, similar to The Sims 2: Pets, and there is no cheat that will allow the player to do so. Sims can interact with these pets in various ways such as feeding, playing and training, and are able to bond with them through these interactions.

Both pets have three life stages; kitten/puppy, adult and elder. They will live through these life stages like normal Sims, but much shorter. Pets can also die, but only from old age. Both cats and dogs can have three different pet traits, which are unique to them and are not available to Sims. These traits control the pets' actions and reactions toward the surrounding world. Some traits have unique attributes for one of the two species, but most traits are identical to one another. After a pet ages into an elder cat or dog, it will live for 6 to 11 Sim days until dying of old age.

Cats and dogs can be created with Create-a-Pet, and there are many pre-made breeds for them. Players will be able to customize their pets' appearance and even make their own breeds. Create-a-Pet borrows the same click and drag mechanic from Create-a-Sim, making players able to sculpt and mold their pets to have more details and features.

==== Vet clinics ====
Cats & Dogs also introduces vet clinics to the series. They are a lot type and a business that Sims can own. Cats and dogs can now have various types of illnesses, that can be easily cured by veterinarians. They are treated with different types of medicine and in serious situations with a surgery station, that can also neuter and un-neuter pets.

Sims can now learn the veterinarian skill, which is essential to running their own vet clinic. Vet clinics are handled similarly to restaurants from Dine Out, as customers have a rating system that determines the vet clinics overall star rating. Pets are treated on exam tables and require some amounts of researching to diagnose the disease, before treating them with the appropriate medicine. The pets also have a stress bar to showcase the player their current level of stress. Treating pets successfully can raise the overall rating of the clinic.

==== SPCA partnership ====
EA partnered with Society for the Prevention of Cruelty to Animals (SPCA) to host challenges for players. EA and Maxis pledged to donate $20,000 to the SPCA to fight animal cruelty and abuse. The challenges lasted from November 13 to December 10, 2017.

=== Reception ===
On the aggregator site Metacritic, Cats & Dogs received a score of 80/100 based on 9 reviews, indicating "generally favorable reviews". Hardcore Gamer's Spencer Rutledge called Cats & Dogs "an excellent — and much-needed" expansion for the game. Twinfinite's Yamilia Avendano praised the new world but said the Vet Clinic "can get too easy and dull".

== Seasons ==
The Sims 4: Seasons is the fifth expansion pack, released on June 22, 2018. It introduces seasons and holidays into the game. Unlike previous expansions, Seasons does not ship with a new world. The pack uses elements from The Sims 2: Seasons and The Sims 3: Seasons.

=== Gameplay and development ===
==== Seasons and weather ====
Seasons introduces weather and seasons as its primary core mechanics. The various new forms of weather allow Sims to live their everyday lives in new ways. The four seasons of spring, summer, fall and winter also shape the entire lives of Sims, allowing for new activities, festivities and more. During summer, heatwaves and hot temperatures are prominent, while in winter snowfalls are an everyday occurrence alongside freezing temperatures. Spring and fall are the seasons with heavy rainfalls and either cold or warm temperatures, depending on the season.

All worlds have their own unique climates with different weather patterns, including rainy, cloudy, sunny and snowy. During rainfall, Sims are able to jump on water puddles created by the rain, or save money by taking showers in them outside. Rainy weather mostly happens during spring and fall, but is also probable during summer. Thunderstorms may appear as well, giving Sims tense emotions and lightning all over the neighborhood. Snow is the equivalent of rain during winter and usually happens when the temperature reaches cold. Snow will land on the ground, roofs and outdoor furniture and Sims can create snow angels and snowpals. Cloudy and sunny weather appear on all four seasons and usually only have environmental changes. Worlds also have different weather for their current season. For example, in Oasis Springs there might be no snow in winter, while Willow Creek would be covered in snow.

Temperature is another big mechanic introduced in Seasons. Temperature adapts to the current weather and season, and have various effects on the environment and Sims themselves. When temperatures become too hot, Sims will start wearing their hot weather clothing, or else they will die from overheating. Heatwaves are also prominent during summer, that are deadly to Sims who are not prepared. During winter, cold temperatures tend to happen, with the opposite effects of hot temperatures. Sims will start wearing their winter clothing and fishing, for example, becomes unavailable.

==== Holidays ====
Holidays in Seasons are very customizable. They are worldwide events that repeat each year, and each come with their own set of traditions which define the way the Sims celebrate the holiday. There are multiple pre-made holidays, and players are able to create their own or edit/delete the pre-made ones. Holidays begin at 6:00 am and end at 2:00 am of the next day. When the holiday ends, Sims will get a happy or sad moodlet, depending on how many traditions they completed. Surprise holidays will occasionally pop up in Sims' calendars a few days before they occur, such as "Talk Like a Pirate Day".

Traditions are the main core feature of holidays and they come in various forms. Each holiday can have up to 5 different traditions and they determine how a holiday is celebrated. The traditions vary from eating a grand meal to partying, appreciating things and singing together. Each holiday can be assigned a decoration theme, which will allow the current household to choose from appropriate decorations to place on the outside of their house, via the "Attic Shack Decoration Box" (which can be bought in build mode). Neighboring houses will automatically be decorated when a holiday starts, unless the theme is set to "None".

=== Reception ===
Review aggregator website Metacritic gave Seasons a score of 81/100, indicating "generally favorable reviews". Yamilia Avendano from Twinfinite praised the new features introduced into the game but criticized the lack of a new world, saying "it's a shame that there isn't a whole new world and I personally can't forgive that." Avendano also rated the pack saying it's "worthy of your time and attention", provided the player owned and enjoyed The Sims 4. Hardcore Gamer's Spencer Rutledge praised the expansion for "adding a tremendous amount of depth" to The Sims 4 and that he "can't wait for the changes Seasons brings to my Sims' lives."

== Get Famous ==
The Sims 4: Get Famous is the sixth expansion pack, announced on October 9, 2018, and released on November 16, 2018. The pack focuses on being a celebrity, wealth, fame and its new Actor active career. The pack's theme is similar to The Sims: Superstar; and a combination of elements from The Sims 3: Late Night and The Sims 3: Showtime.

=== Gameplay and development ===
==== World ====
Get Famous includes Del Sol Valley, a new world that is based on Los Angeles, Hollywood and Hollywood Hills in particular. It is a big suburban area of a city, located near an ocean, and is focused on various celebrity Sims, both new and old. Del Sol Valley has a total of eleven lots.

==== Fame and reputation ====
Fame is one of the main features of Get Famous, and determines how popular Sims are in their careers. Fame is obtained through certain interactions that gain popularity from certain skills. Sims can also gain fame from working in their jobs, especially Actors. Celebrities can also earn and manage fame perks in order to gain advantages with more fame and reputation, as well as certain boosts to careers, friends, and media production.

Reputation is another feature that plays a part in the public image of a Sim. Every Sim has a reputation, both good and bad, but if it stays neutral it won't have any bearing on gameplay. A celebrity's reputation garners a reaction from nearby Sims. If a celebrity has either a neutral, good, great or pristine reputation, they will get cheers and happy reactions from other Sims. If they have a bad, awful or an atrocious reputation, celebrities will receive boos and other negative attention from nearby Sims. Sims who perform famous acts, such as acting, publishing a book, trend setting, etc., may get celebrity awards from the "Starlight Accolades" award ceremony.

==== Acting career ====
Get Famous adds the Actor active career, and is the main way of gaining fame in Get Famous. Actors must join one of two agencies to start getting auditions: "A.I. Staffing Agency" or "Everyday Extras Talent Agency". Either agency will send notifications reminding their actors to find auditions and getting gigs to start getting an income. Actors can succeed or fail in the audition. Auditions may be bypassed once the Sim reaches Level 3 in fame by obtaining the "established name" perk.

When actors have an acting gig, they must attend to the studio lot and perform their daily tasks, consisting of getting their costume fitted, hair styled, practicing lines, talking with the director, etc. When the actor is ready, they can speak to the director and be directed to the main stage. In the main stage, the actor must carry out an array of actions, depending on their acting skill.

== Island Living ==
The Sims 4: Island Living is the seventh expansion pack, released on June 21, 2019. It allows Sims to live in the Polynesian-themed world of Sulani, a tropical island. Sims can enjoy themselves in relaxing beach activities, lounging in cool waters, or exploring the oceans by either snorkeling or canoeing, where they can meet mermaids and dolphins. A conservationist career is introduced along with several part-time jobs. It is the spiritual successor to The Sims 3: Island Paradise.

=== Gameplay and development ===
==== World ====
Sulani is divided into three islands:

- Ohan'ali Town – This is where most lots on the islands reside and notably the most inhabited island on Sulani. It has now developed into the main town region.
- Lani St. Taz is a tropical paradise where the beaches are filled with white sand, along with the water being warm.
- Mua Pel'am is situated near the active volcano. Nature rules over this island, from the volcano to a waterfall to a cave. There are no sims that live on this island.

==== Mermaids ====
Mermaids have similar needs to normal Sims, but replace the Hygiene need with a new need, Hydration. In order to maintain this need, a mermaid Sim can go swimming (either in the ocean or a swimming pool), shower, bathe or take a drink of water. In exchange for this restriction, mermaids have the ability to influence the moods and actions of other Sims with various Siren Songs, most of which deplete Hydration. While swimming in the ocean, mermaids also have the ability to summon an azure dolphin. Azure dolphins function identically to regular dolphins, save for the ability to summon them anywhere.

=== Reception ===
On the aggregator site Metacritic, Island Living received a score of 84 based on 6 reviews by critics, indicating "generally favorable reviews". However, reviews given by the website's users were substantially more negative with the pack receiving a score of 4.7 based on 33 ratings, indicating "generally unfavorable reviews". Entertainment news website Geek Culture gave the expansion 7.5/10 commenting "The island and the world is beautifully created and the amount of effort and attention to detail is evident in its surrounding but regular players might be a bit unnerved by the lack of activity for this expansion pack." Another entertainment website, Digital Spy, stated "Sulani feels like more than just a holiday destination. It's a living, breathing world that is easy to get lost in."

== Discover University ==
The Sims 4: Discover University is the eighth expansion pack, released on November 15, 2019. It adds two new educational institutions: the University of Britechester and the Foxbury Institute, in a new world called Britechester and allows Sims to attend university and earn degrees. The pack uses elements from The Sims 2: University and The Sims 3: University Life.

=== Gameplay and development ===
==== World ====
This pack introduces a new world called Britechester with two universities: University of Britechester and Foxbury Institute. Britechester has a total of 13 lots.

==== Degrees ====
Discover University introduces thirteen degrees that are available at any university. Sims can take four classes per semester toward any normal degree, and each degree is associated with a few skills. Every full-time career benefits from at least one associated degree. Scholarships and student loans are available for students.

=== Reception ===
On the aggregator site Metacritic, Discover University received a score of 81 based on 11 reviews by critics, indicating "generally favorable reviews". However, reviews given by the website's users were significantly more critical with the pack receiving a score of 4.5 based on 28 ratings, indicating "generally unfavorable reviews". Entertainment news website Screen Rant gave the expansion a rating of 4/5 describing it as "a fun academic experience that accurately and entertainingly depicts college life." Another review in the gaming magazine Gamereactor gave it a rating of 8/10 stating that the pack is "alongside Get Famous, the best expansion released in the last five years of the game's existence."

== Eco Lifestyle ==
The Sims 4: Eco Lifestyle is the ninth expansion, released on June 5, 2020. The pack introduces sustainable living as a main concept to the Sims series for the first time.

=== Gameplay ===
Eco Lifestyle includes three neighborhoods in the new world of Evergreen Harbor. Each neighborhood includes an Eco Footprint which is also a new feature of this expansion pack. The Eco Footprints are green, neutral and industrial. The Eco Footprint will determine how polluted the neighborhoods will be and can affect any of the worlds available through downloadable content.

The pack introduces two careers: Crafter and Civil Designer. The Crafter career is a specialization within the Freelancer career and involves creating items for clients and selling them through a computer. The Civil Designer career focuses on environmental and community-related projects. At level four, the career branches into two specializations: Civic Planner and Green Technician.

There are also two new aspirations added into the pack. The Master Maker uses the Crafter career and the Fabrication Skill. In order to complete this milestone the Crafter Career and Fabrication Skill need to be developed and completed. The Eco Innovator ties in with the Civil Designer career. In order to complete this milestone the Civil Designer career needed to be developed and Neighborhood Action Plans need to be voted on.

The Fabrication skill is a DIY or upcycling skill that includes ten levels. The Fabricator, a machine used to create furniture, and the candle making station can be used to further develop this skill. In order to use the Fabricator, Bits and Pieces must be collected from the trash, inventory or created with the Home Recycler. When the Bits and Pieces are used to make furniture with the Fabricator, they are automatically taken from the inventory. The second way to gain the Fabrication skill is with Candle Making Station. This will also require the use of Bits and Pieces but also wax, which can be purchased at the station or collected from plants. The more this skill is developed, the more furniture and candles to fabricate will be unlocked.

=== Reception ===
On the aggregator site Metacritic, Eco Lifestyle received a score of 82 based on 10 reviews by critics, indicating "generally favorable reviews". However, reviews given by the website's users were far less positive with the pack receiving a score of 2.4 based on 19 ratings, indicating "generally unfavorable reviews". A review in the entertainment magazine GamesRadar+ gave the pack a 4.5/5 commenting "Eco Lifestyle can feel like an uphill battle, but that's one of the best aspects of The Sims 4's gameplay. You have to earn your stripes, put in some serious work, and balance a lot of things at once in order to make a demonstrable change in this world." A review in another gaming magazine, Gamereactor, gave the game 8/10. Entertainment website GodisaGeek stated "Eco Lifestyle is another game changer for The Sims 4, and a true home run for Maxis."

== Snowy Escape ==
The Sims 4: Snowy Escape is the 10th expansion pack, released on November 13, 2020. centers on activities such as snowboarding, skiing, sledding and mountain climbing, as well as the new lifestyles game mechanic. It includes Mt. Komorebi, a snowy, Japanese-inspired mountainous world featuring new types of weather. This expansion pack presents a broader experience than what was first explored in The Sims: Vacation, reimagining vacations in cold climates and their associated leisure and sporting activities in the snow.

=== Gameplay and development ===
==== World ====
The expansion features the world of Mt. Komorebi – a snowy and mountainous region with Japanese-inspired architecture based on two Japanese islands, Honshū and Hokkaido. It has both residential homes and rental lots, allowing Sims to both live and vacation there. With the pack's associated base game update, Sims are also able to vacation in any other residential world. All lots in Mt. Komorebi were built by popular The Sims 4 players.

==== Lifestyles ====
The pack also features a new game mechanic called lifestyles. It consists of a series of traits that can be acquired by Sims by performing or not performing certain activities. These traits in turn influence Sims' behavior and emotions as they interact with their environment. A Sim can have a maximum of three lifestyles at once.

Sixteen lifestyles are included in the pack, and many of these will conflict with another lifestyle (e.g. Techie and Technophobe). Lifestyle traits can also be lost if a Sim does not maintain the behavior required – for example if a Sim with the "Indoorsy" lifestyle decides to spend lots of time outdoors, they may lose the "Indoorsy" lifestyle and may even acquire the "Outdoorsy" lifestyle instead.

===== Development =====
The development of Snowy Escape began with the idea of introducing winter sports, while the location was created inspired by Japan, its ancient and modern traditions. In January 2020, Maxis issued a survey hinting at the development of a pack featuring snow activities. Mt. Komorebi is a world based on two Japanese islands, Honshū and Hokkaido. It features shoji doors, tile roofs, tatami mats, Koi and Japanese maple trees. Players can design traditional Japanese houses. "Komorebi" (木漏れ日) is a Japanese phrase that means "sunbeams or sunlight streaming through trees".

The Nishidake family (Kaori in particular) is a reference to the SSX snowboarding games, seen by Kaori's innate 7 Snowboarding skill and birthplace in Hokkaido. There are residential lots and rental lots for vacationing. It was created to expand the cultural diversity of the game's world, which began with the addition of Island Living.

=== Controversy ===
Controversy erupted surrounding the depiction of Japanese culture in Snowy Escape. In the initial reveal trailer, a Sim is shown bowing at a shrine, and another Sim is shown wearing a robe which has a design that resembles the war flag used by Japan during World War II. South Korean players have found these depictions offensive, as they relate to the colonization of Korea by Japan. These references were removed from the reveal trailer and the final game.

=== Reception ===
On the aggregator site Metacritic, Snowy Escape received a score of 80 based on 15 reviews by critics, indicating "generally favorable reviews". However, reviews given by the website's users were less positive with the pack receiving a score of 4.1 based on 12 ratings, indicating "generally unfavorable reviews". Gaming news website Game Rant stated "it's clear that a lot of thought and effort" went into the expansion's development and that "this is the pack players have been asking for." However, a more critical review in the entertainment website Screen Rant focused on flaws in the pack's functioning commenting that it 'features some interesting elements but too many hiccups or setbacks to let them shine through the whiteout conditions of its failings.'

== Cottage Living ==
The Sims 4: Cottage Living is the 11th expansion pack, released on July 22, 2021. The pack focuses on country life, and includes various animals such as cows, chickens, llamas, wild birds, rabbits and foxes. It also features the England-inspired rural world of Henford-on-Bagley. This expansion pack presents a broader experience than what was first explored in The Sims: Unleashed and a combination of DLC content from The Sims 3 Store such as "Farm Fresh Folk Set", "Grandpa's Grove", and "Country Livin'".

=== Reception ===
On the aggregator site Metacritic, Cottage Living received a score of 80 based on 12 reviews by critics, indicating "generally favorable reviews". Gaming website TechRaptor gave the expansion a 7/10 commenting that "Thanks to an excellent new location to explore and some solid build mode items, this pack successfully stands out from the crowd but the lacklustre new gameplay elements and low level but persistent technical problems mean that this pack falls a little short of greatness."

Cultural magazine NME elaborated on some of the technical issues the game suffered in more detail noting "For many [customers], the game would not download or appear in their library, and some also found their pre-order bonus items missing." Problems within the gameplay were also seen with suggestions that "issues with the fridge item and storing things inside it appear to be common, as well as pathing issues and problems where Sims get stuck doing the same task over and over."

Dexerto gave the expansion a rating of 7.5 out of ten, arguing that "Cottage Living is a step in the right direction for The Sims team and shows that they're listening to what the community wants. With a beautiful world, deep story, returning, and highly requested features, the overall experience of Cottage Living is incredibly positive. However, after taking off the rose-tinted glasses and taking a step back, it highlights significant gaps in the overall gameplay loop that need to be expanded upon to truly create something that will give its players more to keep coming back to in The Sims."

== High School Years ==
The Sims 4: High School Years is the 12th expansion pack, released on July 28, 2022. The expansion reintroduces similar mechanics of Discover University, this time focusing on a high school experience for teens, such as the ability to control teens while they are at school, similar to the active jobs included in the previous Get to Work and Get Famous expansions. It also introduces a world named Copperdale.

=== Reception ===
High School Years received a score of 74/100 on the review aggregator site Metacritic, indicating "mixed or average reviews".

Digital Spy gave the expansion pack 4 out of five stars, praising the expanded gameplay options and depth for younger Sims via the high school gameplay, but encountered several gameplay glitches and a few students on the high school lot due to game engine limitations.

Dexerto gave a rating of 6.5 out of ten, praising the gameplay variety, and the similarity of the Copperdale world to towns found in teen TV dramas, but criticized the lack of depth found in its gameplay events, describing them as "situations that are just tied to pop-ups."

== Growing Together ==
The Sims 4: Growing Together is the 13th expansion pack, released on March 16, 2023. The new features and gameplay components in this pack are centered on familial interactions and dynamics. Players can influence their Sims' youth by helping them develop abilities, form friendships, and navigate family dynamics. Players can help their Sims as they mature by negotiating the difficulties of adolescence and early adulthood, such as choosing friendships, relationships, and careers.

Released two days after The Sims 4 infant update, it focuses on family and childhood gameplay, similar to The Sims 3: Generations and The Sims 4: Parenthood, and includes a new San Francisco-inspired world named San Sequoia.

=== Reception ===
Growing Together received a score of 82/100 on the review aggregator site Metacritic, indicating "generally favorable reviews".

Digital Spy gave the expansion pack 4 out of five stars, stating that the expansion introduced many features that improve storytelling in the game and that they "wouldn't want to play without" it. However, the world is seen as underwhelming and lacking "personality and individuality".

Dexerto gave a rating of 3 out five stars, praising the addition of features that add depth to generational gameplay and its Create-A-Sim and Build and Buy mode features, but criticizing the "shallow-feeling" world.

== Horse Ranch ==
The Sims 4: Horse Ranch is the 14th expansion pack, released on July 21, 2023. This American Western-style pack allows players to build horse ranches, as well as raise and ride horses. It borrows the equestrianism elements from The Sims 3: Pets. The pack includes an American Southwestern-themed world named Chestnut Ridge.

=== Reception ===
Horse Ranch received a score of 68/100 on the review aggregator site Metacritic, indicating "mixed or average reviews".

Digital Spy gave the expansion pack 4 out of five stars, complimenting the world, the horse customization, and gameplay features, but saying that the "biggest disappointment" was the equestrian center competitions, which are "nothing more than a rabbit hole" and pop-ups.

Screen Rant gave it a rating of 3 out of five stars, stating that the competitions felt "somewhat detached" and that it felt more like a game pack due to its lack of depth in certain areas. The world is described as "beautiful" and the gameplay features as "worthwhile".

== For Rent ==
The Sims 4: For Rent is the 15th expansion pack, released on December 7, 2023. This pack allows players to build rental residential houses, with multiple families of Sims living in the same lot. It allows certain Sims to become property owners, while others play the role of tenants. The pack includes a Southeast Asia-themed world named Tomarang. This expansion pack can be seen as a reimagining of apartment living as first showcased in The Sims 2: Apartment Life, and again in The Sims 3: Late Night.

=== Reception ===
For Rent received a score of 67/100 on the review aggregator site Metacritic, indicating "mixed or average reviews".

After the pack was announced on November 2, 2023, various players complained on social media that the For Rent pack felt like it was only a slightly updated version of the City Living pack that was published seven years earlier.

== Lovestruck ==
The Sims 4: Lovestruck is the 16th expansion pack, released on July 25, 2024. It is supported in Czech, Danish, German, English, Spanish, Finnish, French, Italian, Russian, Polish, Portuguese (Brazil), Swedish, Japanese, Chinese (Simplified and Traditional), Korean, Norwegian Bokmål and Dutch.

The Sims 4: Lovestruck includes a new app called Cupid's Corner which allows you to Go on a Blind Date, regardless of the Sim's turn-ons and turn-offs, Cupid's Counselling and Cupid's Dating Guide. There is also a new Mexican-themed world called Ciudad Enamorada (City in Love), a new Singles Hangout lot trait and a new job called "Romance Consultant". Sims can have Turn-Ons and Turn-Offs and Sims also have Romantic Satisfaction and a Relationship Dynamic. Other romance-related packs from other earlier Sims games include The Sims: Hot Date and The Sims 2: Nightlife.

=== Reception ===
Lovestruck received a score of 71/100 on Metacritic, indicating "mixed or average reviews". Lovestruck was given a 3/5 "Good" by Screen Rant. Dexerto's Olly Smith however, gave it a 4/5, calling it an "expansion worthy of the name".

== Life & Death ==
The Sims 4: Life & Death is the 17th expansion pack, released on October 31, 2024. It centers on mortality, mourning, ghosts, and afterlife storytelling, and introduces the gothic world of Ravenwood. The pack adds funerals, Bucket Lists, Unfinished Business, Ghostly Powers, rebirth, tarot cards, crows, and an active career connected to the Grim Reaper. Ravenwood is divided into three neighborhoods, including Crow's Crossing, and is designed around ghost stories and transitions between life and death.

=== Reception ===
Life & Death received a score of 86/100 on Metacritic, indicating "generally favorable reviews". It became the highest-rated The Sims 4 expansion pack on the review aggregator at the time of its release.

== Businesses & Hobbies ==
The Sims 4: Businesses & Hobbies is the 18th expansion pack, released on March 6, 2025. It focuses on entrepreneurship and craft-based hobbies, allowing Sims to operate small businesses from home or community lots and to set customer rules for different activities. The pack introduces the Scandinavian-inspired world of Nordhaven, the Tattooing skill, the Pottery skill, and Tattoo Paint Mode, which allows players to create and share custom tattoo designs through the Gallery.

=== Reception ===
Businesses & Hobbies received a score of 70/100 on Metacritic, indicating "mixed or average reviews". Digital Spy gave the expansion 3 out of 5 stars, describing it as "disjointed" but noting that its small-business gameplay contained some enjoyable ideas. Dexerto also rated the pack 3 out of 5, praising its cross-pack functionality while criticizing its limited number of new skills.

== Enchanted by Nature ==
The Sims 4: Enchanted by Nature is the 19th expansion pack, released on July 10, 2025. The expansion adds fairies as a playable occult life state and introduces the lush world of Innisgreen. Its gameplay focuses on natural living, magical mischief, Apothecary crafting, and Ailments, a system of conditions that can create challenges or situational benefits for Sims. Following player feedback, Maxis later added a pack setting that lets players disable Ailment spread.

=== Reception ===
Enchanted by Nature received an average score of 74/100 on Metacritic, indicating "mixed or average reviews". Phil Owen of GameSpot and Madison Benson of Destructoid reviewed the pack favorably, praising the design of Innisgreen and the fairy life state. Jess Lee of Digital Spy was more critical, arguing that fairies were weaker than earlier occult additions and that the natural-living systems did not fully cohere with the fairy theme.

== Adventure Awaits ==
The Sims 4: Adventure Awaits is the 20th expansion pack, announced on September 4, 2025, and released on October 2, 2025. It introduces the coastal world of Gibbi Point and emphasizes travel, outdoor recreation, and group activities. A major feature is the Getaway system, which lets players create structured trips and custom venue schedules for Sims and groups.

=== Reception ===
Adventure Awaits received an average score of 75/100 on Metacritic, indicating "generally favorable reviews".

== Royalty & Legacy ==
The Sims 4: Royalty & Legacy is the 21st expansion pack, announced on January 15, 2026, and released on February 12, 2026. The expansion introduces nobility, dynasties, succession storytelling, and royal drama to the game. Sims can rise through ranks of Nobility, build a Dynasty, manage Prestige and Unity, and face Scandals such as forbidden romances, secret children, and forged family trees. The pack includes the new world of Ondarion and draws on storybook and historical-fantasy imagery rather than a single real-world monarchy.

=== Development ===
Maxis said that player feedback helped shape the pack from early concept work through playtesting, including the design of its royal-fantasy theme and drama systems. Additional creator-built lots and recipes were incorporated into Ondarion as part of the pack's community-collaboration material.

=== Reception ===
Royalty & Legacy received an average score of 75/100 on Metacritic, indicating "generally favorable reviews".

== See also ==
- The Sims 4 game packs
- The Sims 4 stuff packs
