= The Sims 3 expansion packs =

2009 video game expansion pack list

Aggregate review scores
Game	GameRankings	Metacritic
World Adventures	82.91%	81/100
Ambitions	75.93%	74/100
Late Night	81.50%	74/100
Generations	73.93%	72/100
Pets	70.00%	79/100
Showtime	73.12%	67/100
Supernatural	79.43%	74/100
Seasons	-	73/100
University Life	78.11%	72/100
Island Paradise	77.13%	73/100
Into the Future	83.00%	80/100

Eleven expansion packs were released for the 2009 life simulation video game The Sims 3, the third major title in The Sims series. Of the eleven expansion packs, seven were developed by Maxis Redwood Shores, while the other four were developed by EA Salt Lake. All expansion packs were published by Electronic Arts. Expansion packs tend to focus on major new features, with the addition of many new objects, worlds, and game features geared towards the pack's major theme. The first expansion pack, World Adventures, was released on November 18, 2009. The last expansion pack, Into the Future, was released on October 22, 2013.

== World Adventures ==
The Sims 3: World Adventures
- Developers: Maxis Redwood Shores (Windows, macOS); EA Mobile (Mobile)
- Publisher: Electronic Arts
- Platforms: Microsoft Windows, macOS, iOS, Mobile
- Release: NA: November 18, 2009; EU: November 20, 2009

The Sims 3: World Adventures is the first expansion pack for The Sims 3, announced on August 3, 2009, and released in North America on November 18, 2009.

The pack focuses on traveling to various areas in a manner similar to previous expansions The Sims: Vacation and The Sims 2: Bon Voyage. Sims are able to travel to fictional locations set in France, China, and Egypt. At these locations, Sims are able to go on adventures to earn rewards. Sims are able to level up in new skills: photography, martial arts, and nectar making. The expansion also added a new life state, the mummy, which can be added to a household through several means. A separate standalone version was also developed for mobile devices.

=== Gameplay ===
The main feature in World Adventures is the ability to travel to three new destinations. Sims can only stay at destinations for limited durations based on their combined visa levels. Having more visa points unlocks new levels. Having a higher visa level, in addition to lifetime rewards and certificates of partnership with specific destinations, will extend the duration Sims can stay in a destination, from three days to a maximum of 18 days for a single Sim, and up to 72 days for a household. Visa level 3 Sims can purchase a vacation home in all 3 destinations.

==== Destinations ====
Sims can travel to three fictional destinations set in real-life countries. In these destinations, Sims can meet with the locals, form new friendships, and go on adventures. Each destination has a unique skill associated with it. The three destinations are:

- Al Simhara, Egypt – This destination is the main location for the new Photography skill. This destination also features many tombs that can be explored, and is the home of the new mummy life state.
- Champs Les Sims, France – Sims can learn the Nectar Making skill, based on winemaking, enabling Sims to brew Nectar, which give Sims positive moodlets when consumed.
- Shang Simla, China – Sims can learn the new Martial Arts skill, which works in tandem with the existing Athletic skill to improve a Sim's fighting ability.

==== Adventures ====
In each destination, there is an adventure board outside the base camp. Sims can pick Adventures to fulfill, similar to opportunities in the base game. Adventures can consist of a simple goal such as collecting a certain material and returning it to the quest giver, or a more complex one, such as exploring one of the expansion's many tombs. Sims earn visa points, ancient coins, and Simoleons from completing these tasks.

Every destination also has a general store for purchasing adventuring supplies, and souvenirs. New items include dried food, shower-in-a-can, and a variety of different quality tents. These new items are required for sleeping and surviving in dungeons when fulfilling Adventures.

===== Dungeons =====
Inside dungeons, Sims will encounter traps, puzzles and the new mummy creature. Most dungeons are fairly linear though some are larger than others and feature more items. Ancient coins and relics can also be found in dungeons. These collectibles can be sold, or displayed as a collection. Many relics can be sold for large amounts of Simoleons, making it a viable way to make money in the game.

==== Skills ====
Martial Arts – Learned in Shang Simla. This skill lets Sims become powerful fighters, and is helpful for defeating mummies in Al Simhara. The skill also enables Sims to meditate, giving a meditative focus moodlet. This moodlet boosts skill gains and increase the quality of crafted goods. Sims who master meditation can learn to teleport.

Nectar Making – Learned in Champs Les Sims. Nectar can be aged in a cellar with nectar racks, and can be highly profitable if the bottles are aged enough, as well as if they were made with high quality fruits/grapes. In Champs Les Sims, special grapes meant for making nectar can be harvested or purchased to plant back home, but any fruit in the game can be used to make nectar.

Photography – Primarily in Al Simhara. While Sims can buy a cheap camera in any location, there are two high end camera models that are only available in Al Simhara's general store. Sims can capture subjects with these cameras, and photos can be sold for small amounts of money.

=== Development ===
Producer Lyndsay Pearson said that real-world locations were a draw for their players, and that users had been creating famous buildings on the online Exchange; the pack represented an extension of that desire. Pearson also stated that there were innovations present in the pack, that could not have been achieved in Sims titles before.

==== Music ====
The score to World Adventures was composed by Steve Jablonsky, who had previously composed the score to The Sims 3. He recorded his score with a 35-piece string and woodwind ensemble at Eastwest Studios in Hollywood.

Nelly Furtado, Pixie Lott, Stefanie Heinzmann, Matt & Kim, The Young Punx and other artists contributed songs in Simlish for the pack.

=== Reception ===
Early reception of World Adventures was positive, earning a Metacritic rating of 81.

GamePro argued the pack's only bad feature was being able to make players lose several hours in the addictive gameplay. IGN's Steve Butts criticized the adventure-based gameplay and the difficulty of having family vacations, however, he concluded, "I hope World Adventures sets the pattern for future Sims expansions."

World Adventures was listed as seventh in a list of the top ten selling PC games (expansion pack) of 2009, according to NPD sales charts. The Sims 3 was listed as the highest selling game of 2009.

== Ambitions ==
The Sims 3: Ambitions
- Developers: Maxis Redwood Shores (Windows, macOS); EA Mobile (Mobile)
- Publisher: Electronic Arts
- Platforms: Microsoft Windows, macOS, iOS, Mobile
- Release: NA: June 1, 2010; AU: June 3, 2010; EU: June 4, 2010

The Sims 3: Ambitions is the second expansion pack for The Sims 3, released in North America on June 1, 2010. Ambitions introduces new professions that can be actively controlled by the player, unlike the careers in the base game. A variety of new skills are also added alongside the ability to register as self employed for skills. The expansion also added a new world, Twinbrook. A separate standalone version was also developed for mobile devices.

=== Gameplay ===
Professions are the main focus of Ambitions, and allows players to actively control a sim at their job. The new active careers in the pack can have your Sim become an Architect, a Doctor, a Firefighter, a Ghost Hunter, a Private Investigator, or a Stylist. Self employed professions were also added, which utilize base game skills or the new skills added by the expansion pack, as well as other expansions' skills, regardless if they came out before or after Ambitions. This can ensure your Sim's skills if they profit off them, can be considered as Employment in the game. The new skills added are Sculpture and Inventing. A new life state was also added, the SimBot, a robot that can be created by a sim with a high Inventing skill, or can be purchased with Lifetime Happiness points.

=== Development ===
Associate producer Grant Rodiek explained that career-based gameplay was something that the team had always wanted to do. "We always strive to do something new that hasn't been seen in The Sims before." Rodiek explained the main focus of an expansion pack relied on three elements: community feedback, what the development team wants to do and software limitations.

=== Reception ===
Anthony Gallegos of IGN have said that "it doesn't reinvent the series but it's much more substantial than many other Sims expansions." GameSpot's Kevin VanOrd on the other hand, called it "a thoughtful and delightful expansion, [that is] full of wit and character." Dan Stapleton of PC Gamer gave the game an 85 out of 100, praising its new additions and careers. Tracy Erickson of Pocket Gamer reviewed the iPhone version of the game, giving it 7 out of 10 and praising the customization system, addition of babies and easiness when it comes to cooking.

== Late Night ==
The Sims 3: Late Night
- Developer: Maxis Redwood Shores
- Publisher: Electronic Arts
- Platforms: Microsoft Windows, macOS
- Release: NA: October 26, 2010; EU: October 28–29, 2010; AU: October 28, 2010

The Sims 3: Late Night is the third expansion pack for The Sims 3, announced on July 20, 2010, and released in North America on October 26, 2010. and is similar to The Sims 2: Nightlife and The Sims: Hot Date, as well as incorporating elements from The Sims: Superstar and The Urbz: Sims in the City.

The pack introduces a brand new city neighborhood named Bridgeport, loosely based on New York City, which is divided into an urban downtown area, a less dense uptown area, and a hilly, affluent suburb.

=== Gameplay ===
Late Night adds a celebrity system, based on five stars representing a Sim's level of fame. Celebrity status can be gained through a variety of methods, including through careers added by the expansion, such as the film career, and present in the base game.

In Late Night, Sims can go out to the downtown area of the brand new world called Bridgeport. Bridgeport includes high rises and penthouse suites. The downtown area includes hangouts and bars, including several new community lot types added with the expansion. Some community lots require certain celebrity levels to enter.

The expansion also added a new life state, vampires. Vampires abilities include increased skill learning speed, the ability to read other Sims' minds to find out their traits and relationship status, and the ability to run faster than ordinary Sims. Vampires are also included and expanded on in Supernatural, which added the ability to create a vampire in Create-a-Sim.

Sims can also learn the Mixology skill, which allows them to mix drinks at the new professional bar object. These professional bars are available in Buy Mode. Mixologists can also moonlight at Bars, with new types of Bars in the expansion (e.g. danceclub, dive bar) that are in Bridgeport, and can be built in pre-existing neighbourhoods.

== Generations ==
The Sims 3: Generations
- Developer: Maxis Redwood Shores
- Publisher: Electronic Arts
- Platforms: Microsoft Windows, macOS
- Release: NA: May 31, 2011; EU: June 3, 2011

The Sims 3: Generations is the fourth expansion pack for The Sims 3, announced on April 5, 2011, and released in North America on May 31, 2011.

=== Gameplay ===
Generations added new gameplay options for each sim life stage and interactions centered on family gameplay, such as sleepovers, proms, bachelor/bachelorette parties, after-school activities, and home movies.

The pack added the option to add body hair to males in Create-a-Sim, a first for the series. Two new traits come with Generations, Nurturing and Rebellious.

=== Soundtrack ===
All Time Low contributed their song "Time Bomb" from their album Dirty Work, which was featured in the pack's announcement trailer and in-game radio. Portugal. The Man have also contributed the song "Everything You See (Kids Count Hallelujahs)" from their sixth studio album In The Mountain In The Cloud.

== Pets ==
The Sims 3: Pets
- Developers: Maxis Redwood Shores (Windows, macOS, 3DS); Edge of Reality (consoles)
- Publisher: Electronic Arts
- Platforms: Microsoft Windows, macOS, PlayStation 3, Xbox 360, Nintendo 3DS
- Release: NA: October 18, 2011; EU: October 21, 2011; AU: October 20, 2011

The Sims 3: Pets is the fifth expansion pack for The Sims 3 on Microsoft Windows and macOS, as well as a standalone title on PlayStation 3, Xbox 360 and Nintendo 3DS. It was released on all platforms in North America on October 18, 2011. The pack re-introduces pets such as cats and dogs. The PC/Mac expansion pack additionally adds horses, a first for the series. It serves as the spiritual successor to The Sims 2: Pets and The Sims: Unleashed. Unexpectedly, the expansion pack received publicity in May 2026 when it was revealed that former Scottish National Party Chief Executive Peter Murrell bought it with embezzled funds.

=== Development ===
Pets focuses on adding animals to the game. The player creates their pet in a similar fashion to the existing Create-a-Sim feature. The Create-a-Pet feature allows the player to customize their pets in various ways, including selecting a breed and a set of traits for their pets.

Unlike The Sims 2: Pets and The Sims: Unleashed, the player can now directly control pets. Included in the pack is a new town, Appaloosa Plains. The pre-order only limited edition (excluding PAL versions) of Pets additionally includes a pet store.

On June 8, 2011, producer Ben Bell gave a presentation and demonstration previewing Pets that was streamed over EA's website. The demonstration contained parts of the game that had never been seen before by the public. Christopher Lennertz provided the original score for Pets.

=== Gameplay ===
==== Pets ====
In Pets, players can create and customize pets in Create-a-Pet mode. Players can customize the pet's coat, shape, pattern, and color, as well as body parts. They can also select from pre-designed breeds. Pets use the same trait system as sims, with three traits instead of five. A player can have up to six pets in one household, extending the maximum amount of Sims in a household from eight to ten.

Cats and dogs can be obtained when created with a new household, adopted by computer or phone, or befriended as strays. The reinforcement social system is used to correct bad behaviors and to praise good ones. Getting by with no punishment for bad behavior can lead a pet to take on that trait. When grown up, adult dogs can learn tricks and cats can learn to hunt.

Horses are a new species of pet that is only introduced in the PC/Mac versions of Pets, and are not available in the console games. Horses can be created with the household, adopted using a computer or phone, or bought from the Equestrian Center. Horses can learn two skills – racing and jumping. Wild horses appear in herds in home neighborhoods and can be befriended like other stray pets. Unicorns also appear at night in the wild and can be befriended.

The player can also adopt small pets, such as birds, lizards, turtles or snakes. These can be either purchased at their respective enclosures if one is on the lot, or found on the ground outdoors, similar to how gems and seeds are found.

Appaloosa Plains is the name of the new town in the PC/Mac versions of Pets, named after the Appaloosa breed of horse. The new location is set in a Midwestern United States ranching town nestled between lush green hills.

=== Reception ===
Upon release in North America, The PC/Mac versions of Pets got positive reviews, with IGN rating the game 7.5/10. The console version (360, PS3), also getting a similar score, with IGN giving it a rating of 7/10.

There has also been some issues regarding user-created mods that stopped working properly on the pack. This has been attributed to the developers switching to an in-house animation engine from the proprietary Granny 3D toolkit that they used in the earlier versions of The Sims 3. There are also some problems regarding glitches in the game. Some reported are, problems creating a pet, problems involving graphics, and frequent crashing.

== Showtime ==
The Sims 3: Showtime
- Developer: EA Salt Lake
- Publisher: Electronic Arts
- Platforms: Microsoft Windows macOS
- Release: NA: March 6, 2012; AU: March 8, 2012; EU: March 10, 2012

The Sims 3: Showtime is the sixth expansion pack for The Sims 3, released in North America on March 6, 2012. A limited Collector's Edition includes exclusive in-game content such as a stage and two costumes, along with a poster based on American singer Katy Perry.

=== Gameplay ===
The main feature of showtime is the introduction of three new active careers, singer, acrobat, and magician. The new SimPort feature allows players to send sims on tour to perform special shows in other players' towns. Players can customize the stage in venues with special themed backgrounds, props, lights, and special effects. . A Player can message other players while their Sims are performing in other towns.

Starlight Shores is the new world included in Showtime, loosely based on Downtown Los Angeles. It has show venues in which Sims can perform. SimFest events allow singers, acrobats, and magicians to compete in front of an audience.

=== Release ===
A pre-order exclusive limited edition of Showtime includes an exclusive Ultimate Stage performance venue. A deluxe Katy Perry edition, subtitled Katy Perry Collector's Edition, includes Katy Perry themed objects, hair styles, costumes, fruit-themed stage prop and venue, based on the concept from her third studio album Teenage Dream. The Collector's Edition also includes the Ultimate Stage venue and a poster. This was followed by the release of the Katy Perry's Sweet Treats stuff pack in June.

== Supernatural ==
The Sims 3: Supernatural
- Developer: EA Salt Lake
- Publisher: Electronic Arts
- Platforms: Microsoft Windows macOS, Mobile
- Release: NA: September 4, 2012; EU: September 6, 2012

The Sims 3: Supernatural is the seventh expansion pack for The Sims 3, released in North America on September 4, 2012. A separate standalone Java version for mobiles was also made, which was released on Blackberry App World and Nokia Store.

=== Gameplay ===
Players can create supernatural Sims such as witches, werewolves, vampires (updated from Late Night), ghosts, fairies, and genies (if Showtime is installed) in Create A Sim. Zombies are also reintroduced as a temporary life state. Each have their own supernatural abilities, traits, and interactions. Supernatural comes with a new world called Moonlight Falls. Sims can learn the new alchemy skill which teaches Sims how to brew different potions and elixirs with certain ingredients. New objects include magic broomsticks, magic wands (for witches), an alchemy station, the philosopher's stone, a magic jelly bean bush, a moondial, whac-A-Mole and claw machines, a gypsy caravan, a magic mirror and a sliding bookcase door. Most of the objects have a gothic theme. Bonehilda, a skeleton non-player character who serves as a maid, fire and burglar alarm, returns from The Sims: Makin' Magic. The six new traits included are Supernatural Skeptic, Supernatural Fan, Night Owl, Brooding, Gatherer and Proper. The game also introduces a new fortune teller rabbit-hole career in which Sims work at the gypsy carravan, which has two paths after level five (scam artist and mystic).

The town, Moonlight Falls, is loosely based on the Pacific Northwest, mainly Forks and La Push, and also several fantasy-themed literature and films, such as the Twilight Saga and Harry Potter. Some things, such as households and community lots, bear a striking resemblance to the supposed real-life (or fictional) counterpart, such as Bella Swan (Bailey Swain), Charlie Swan (Chester Swain), La Push (La Shove Beach lot) and Quidditch (Zoomsweeper Arena lot).

=== Release ===
A pre-order exclusive Limited Edition of Supernatural includes exclusive items from the game Plants vs. Zombies.

=== Reception ===
Jon Michael of IGN gave the game 4.5 out of 10 criticizing the repetitive additions and useless spells in the game, as well as a bug that will let the zombies appear every night in the game if the player will save it at night. Leif Johnson of GameSpot on the other hand, praised the expansion for its new career and skills.

== Seasons ==
The Sims 3: Seasons
- Developer: Maxis Redwood Shores
- Publisher: Electronic Arts
- Platforms: Microsoft Windows macOS
- Release: NA: November 13, 2012; EU: November 15, 2012

The Sims 3: Seasons is the eighth expansion pack for The Sims 3, released in North America on November 13, 2012. Like Generations, Seasons does not come with a new world, but instead adds features that apply to every world.

=== Gameplay ===
Seasons added seasons and weather to The Sims 3. Season length can be adjusted by the player. The new types of weather added are rain and lightning, sunny, hail, snow, and fog. Weather varies in intensity and by season. A new outfit category is included in create-a-sim, outerwear, which is worn during inclement weather.

Aliens are also added in Seasons, which have more abilities than those in The Sims 2.

There are four holidays in Seasons, Love Day, Leisure Day, Spooky Day, and Snowflake Day. All holidays take place on the last Thursday of every season. If there is no Thursday, it will take place on the last day of the season. There is also festival held in each season. Festival lots usually replace the main park of the world. Players have full control over the appearance of the festival lots, and can build their own lots that change throughout the year.

A pre-order exclusive limited edition of Seasons includes the Ice Lounge community lot, with ice-themed items like a bar, bar stool, pub table, and other build items.

=== Reception ===
Seasons received "mixed or average" reception according to aggregator Metacritic, which gave the game a rating of 73 out of 100 based on 12 reviews.

Destructoid gave the game a "mediocre" score of 5 out of 10, citing a lack of new careers and public lots. Jon Michael from IGN gave the game a 7.5 rating out of 10 and believes "[The game is] a solid gateway expansion that builds on the rules without overwhelming you, but still adds enough variety that you'll never want to play without it." Amanda "StormyDawn" Hale from Worthplaying.com gave the game an 8.7/10 and claimed even though it isn't a large expansion pack, it is one that it is important for any Sims collection – "It's not the biggest expansion for Sims 3...[but] it may just be the most important."

=== Mobile version ===
Although Seasons was not released on mobile platforms, a winter season based expansion pack for the Java version of The Sims 3 called the Winter Edition was released in some regions in January 2014.

== University Life ==
The Sims 3: University Life
- Developer: EA Salt Lake
- Publisher: Electronic Arts
- Platforms: Microsoft Windows macOS
- Release: NA: March 5, 2013; EU: March 8, 2013

The Sims 3: University Life is the ninth expansion pack for The Sims 3, released in North America on March 5, 2013, coinciding with the release of another Maxis title, SimCity. It is the spiritual successor to The Sims 2: University.

=== Gameplay ===
Sims University is a sub-neighborhood that functions similarly to the vacation worlds in World Adventures. In order to attend university, a Sim must be a young adult, adult or elder. Sims will take an aptitude test before attending university and may earn scholarships based on their performance.

The player can select the Sim's major, out of either Business, Communications, Fine Arts, Physical Education, Science and Medicine, or Technology, as well as the number of credits they wish to study for, and whether they want to study for one or two terms. Taking more credits will allow a Sim to obtain their degree faster, but they will have more of their time taken up by studying. Having a degree will allow a Sim to start at a higher level in certain careers and earn higher wages.

University Life also introduces social groups: Jocks, Nerds and Rebels. The player can join these social groups, and move up in their rankings by befriending members of the group and/or doing activities and interactions related to the group. As they progress through the ranks they can unlock new interactions and objects, and later pick an additional trait. A Sim who reaches rank 10 with a group will be given a job offer in a special career unique to that group.

=== Release ===
The pre-order exclusive limited edition of the game includes the party pack bundle with togas, laurel wreaths, masquerade masks and the Partaeus Maximus statue.

== Island Paradise ==
The Sims 3: Island Paradise
- Developer: Maxis Redwood Shores
- Publisher: Electronic Arts
- Platforms: Microsoft Windows macOS
- Release: NA: June 25, 2013; AU: June 27, 2013; EU: June 28, 2013

The Sims 3: Island Paradise is the tenth expansion pack for The Sims 3, released in North America on June 25, 2013. Island Paradise is a vacation and adventure-themed expansion, similar to The Sims: Vacation, The Sims 2: Bon Voyage, and World Adventures.

=== Gameplay ===
Isla Paradiso is the new world that comes with the pack, loosely based on the Caribbean. "Isla" is Spanish for "island" and "Paradiso" is Italian for "paradise". The world has various types of islands that vary in size and are both inhabited and uncharted, which can be found and explored by Sims. There are also pre-made resorts that can be edited and managed by Sims.

Island Paradise introduces houseboats for Sims to live in. These can be docked at any unoccupied port, or anchored anywhere in the ocean. Houseboats function the same way as other lots; services (newspaper delivery, mail, etc.) will use speedboats and jet skis to access them.

The pack also introduces the Scuba diving skill, which will allow Sims to dive underwater at certain points on the map. Whilst diving, Sims can catch fish, explore underwater caves, find sunken treasure, as well as use a limited set of social interactions. Island Paradise also introduces the Lifeguard active career. Sims can now own and manage resorts, that will provide a daily cash income based on the net profit they make.

Mermaids are the new life state introduced in Island Paradise. Sims can encounter them while diving, and later summon them onto land. Mermaid Sims can breathe underwater, are immune to decompression, and all young adult mermaids have a maximum diving skill. If a mermaid spends too much time out of the ocean they will become a normal Sim.

=== Development and release ===
Island Paradise was announced during a live broadcast on January 8, 2013, where a full line up of upcoming expansion packs and stuff packs of the 2013 year were revealed. Several live broadcasts were later presented and each demonstrated new features, such houseboats, resort system, underwater diving and hidden islands.

The pre-order exclusive limited edition of Island Paradise includes the Island Survival Pack, which includes survival-themed decor, furniture and clothing.

=== Reception ===
The Game Scouts gave the pack a positive score of 9 out of 10, saying: "Island Paradise arrives ideally at the start of Summer. The pack integrates excellently with other expansions like Seasons. While at first glance it may seem like a targeted release, it's all-encompassing in its reach and offers something for every player."

Giancarlo Saldana from GamesRadar remained positive and praised the overall experience of the game even though he believed the underwater feature is a disappointment, as there are only limited diving spots: "Though [the] underwater sections are lacking, the rest of Island Paradise is a great display of what The Sims 3 can still offer fans." But he states that the new features are a real highlight for the overall series: "...the features it brings to the table are definitely some of the best the series has seen."

== Into the Future ==
The Sims 3: Into the Future
- Developer: EA Salt Lake
- Publisher: Electronic Arts
- Platforms: Microsoft Windows macOS
- Release: NA: October 22, 2013; EU: October 24, 2013; UK: October 25, 2013

The Sims 3: Into the Future is the eleventh and final expansion pack for The Sims 3, released on October 22, 2013, in North America.

=== Gameplay ===
The pack is futuristic-themed. Upon installation, players are visited by a time-traveler called Emit Relevart (whose name is "Time Traveler" backwards, as well as a reference to Emmett "Doc" Brown from Back to the Future) in their home neighborhood. Emit gives Sims access to a time machine. Using this portal, Sims can travel to the future into a new sub-neighborhood called Oasis Landing, a futuristic town built amongst mountainous wastelands.

The pack also adds Plumbots, similar to Servos in The Sims 2: Open for Business and SimBots in Ambitions. They can be built and fully customized with the new Create-a-Bot mode. Players can create various trait chips that determine their personality, use and gameplay. Hoverboards, jetpacks, monorails, and hovercars are introduced to the game as new transportation options. New careers include astronomers and bot dealers. New objects include holographic TVs, a hoverboard, a food synthesizer, build-a-bot workshops, and the laser rhythm-a-con, a new instrument.

Sims are also able to visit their future descendants during time travel, and can change or eliminate these descendants altogether if the player sends the Sim back to the present and changes their lifestyle or fate.

=== Development ===
On January 8, 2013, it was revealed on a live broadcast that a futuristic-themed expansion pack was in early stages of development, alongside the announcement of Island Paradise.

The pre-order exclusive limited edition of Into the Future includes the Quantum Power Pack content, which adds a hibernation chamber and multi-function power suit.
