= Andrew Augustin =

American video game designer (born 1988)

- Born: May 22, 1988 (age 37); Mount Vernon, New York, U.S.
- Occupation: Video game designer

Andrew Augustin (born May 22, 1988) is an American video game designer, 2d artist, and founder of Notion Games, LLC. He currently resides in Austin, Texas, and is best known for Super Ubie Island REMIX, Up Up Ubie REMIX, Sheep Herder Nay and Team Notion.

== Education ==
Augustin is a self-taught pioneer in the field of gaming who is recognized for being an innovator in the video gaming industry. Growing up, Augustin always knew he wanted to be an artist and in high school, he used his creative talents to design comic books and small animation, which received recognition from Austin-based music artists in need of cover art for their albums.

Experience, motivation, and recognition for his work led to one of the crowning achievements in his young career: Augustin received a full scholarship and a $10,000 stipend to be in the 2014-2015 inaugural class for the Denius-Sams Gaming Academy at the University of Texas. This led to a certificate in a post-grad program without the need for a bachelor's degree. Prior to receiving this full scholarship, Augustin was a self-taught graphic designer, video game creator, and animator of print and digital cartoons.

In many ways, Augustin has come full circle in the education field. He was hired as an assistant professor in the practice of game design at the University of Texas beginning with the fall semester of 2022.

== Career ==
In 2011, Augustin worked at Edge of Reality in Austin, Texas, where he designed over 400 characters for The Sims 3: Pets (Xbox 360 and PlayStation 3 versions) and created concept art for a cancelled project.

=== Notion Games ===
After working on The Sims 3: Pets, Augustin founded Notion Games in 2011 and released his first title Up Up Ubi for iOS in January, 2012. Augustin states in the C2 podcast that the programmer for Notion Games left the video game industry after work on Up Up Ubi was complete. To get around the problem of having no programmer, Augustin taught himself how to program using Scirra's Construct 2 game engine and created a small prototype featuring his character, Ubie, in a 2d platforming adventure similar to Super Mario Bros. and Donkey Kong Country. Augustin states the Construct 2 community gave very positive feedback and the prototype quickly became one of the top games in the Scirra Arcade. Augustin decided to take the prototype and create a full game which soon became Super Ubie Land.

On February 22, 2013, Augustin launched a Kickstarter campaign to help complete the PC version of Super Ubie Land and to purchase a Wii U development kit to bring the game to Nintendo's system. The Kickstarter project was successfully funded on April 8, 2013, after raising $6,333 surpassing the funding goal of $5,000. Super Ubie Land was released for Windows, Mac, and Linux in August 2013 and greenlit on Steam Greenlight in December, 2014. Super Ubie Land, which is what the game exists as now, was initially called Super Ubi Land but Nintendo requested that Notion Games contact Ubisoft to make sure that there was no conflict with using 'Ubi' in the game's title. After some discussion, Notion and Ubisoft agreed that 'Ubie' was a good compromise. In another turn of events, Nintendo then asked Notion to change the name again and Notion ended up renaming Super Ubie Land to Super Ubie Island. Super Ubie Land is in development for the Wii U and will be released as Super Ubie Island for video game consoles.

=== Educator ===
Augustin's first teaching opportunity was in 2010 working with middle and high school students for an after-school comic and manga class program. He then was an instructor in the Kids N Technology program for elementary-aged children. In 2012, he was an E4 Youth high school program instructor, and four years later, he taught at Girls Make Games, an educational program that showcases the gaming industry to females to demonstrate what job opportunities exist for them in the world of video gaming.

Andrew applied his prior teaching experiences to the classroom full-time in 2018 when he taught animation, video game design, and graphic design at Andy Dekaney High School in Spring, Texas for the next three years. (Prior to entering the classroom to teach, Andrew worked at Aristocrat Gaming Technologies as a Tech Artist and Illustrator on various casino games for Vegas, Macao and others from 2016 to 2018.) His motivation for teaching at Dekaney, a minority-majority school, came from his experiences being one of only two or three Black people on 100-plus-person game development teams.

Certain barriers prohibit minority students who are interested in becoming a developer from pursuing that career path. It's a problem partially perpetuated, Augustin believes, by a lack of exposure: "I thought it was pretty cool that they're able to see somebody that looks like them in an industry that they enjoy playing, but they never really thought about being a part of." During his teaching tenure, several students told Augustin they plan to pursue game design careers, and some have gone on to receive scholarships from art schools.

=== Notion Games Redux ===
After sharing his experiences, insights, and guiding the students for three years, Augustin returned in 2020 to the company he founded to pursue his passions: animation, graphic design, and creating video games. That same year he was one of five Black video game developers to be selected to participate in Play NYC Graffiti Games. Sponsored by Grand Theft Auto developer Rockstar Games. With Rockstar's support, Play NYC organizer Playcrafting commissioned Augustin and four other developers to produce games for the digital event.

Selected by Decoy Games, the five were chosen based on the overall quality of their past work and their potential ability to make a game on short notice (they had just over a month to create a build for the event), as well as a desire to find devs who would produce games in a variety of genres and styles. Participation in this event can be an important stepping stone in the selected developers' careers, as it allows them early exposure and a network of support from others in the games industry.

In August 2020, Augustin's work was highlighted in The Hollywood Reporter, specifically the creation of his latest game, Sheep Herder Nay. Sheep Herder Nay is a puzzle game that requires the player to deliver the sheep she is herding to safety while trying to escape the claws of the big bad wolf character. The game is inspired, in part, by his sister he calls Nay Nay. Augustin developed the game for his children, who he always wants to be able to enjoy his creations.

In addition to his solo work at Notion Games, Augustin has also worked as a freelance developer for Bleacher Report, the Food Network, and Electronic Arts, among others. Augustin has been recognized for being an innovator in the video gaming industry in the 2022 book titled Innovate Gaming and Esports, vol. 1.

== Games ==
- The Sims 3: Pets (2011), Electronic Arts (world builder and character designer)
- Up Up Ubi (2012), Notion Games (game designer, artist)
- Super Ubie Land (2013), Notion Games (game designer, programmer, artist)
- Astro Vault (2013), Notion Games (game designer, artist)
- Up Up Ubie REMIX (2014), Notion Games (game designer, programmer, artist)
- The Calm Before (2015), Denius Sams Gaming Academy and University of Texas (concept artist, art director, creative director)
- Super Ubie Island REMIX (2016), Notion Games (game Designer, programmer, artist)
- Team Notion (2017), Notion Games (game designer, programmer, artist)
- Sheep Herder Nay (2017), Notion Games (game designer, programmer, artist)
- Ankle Breakers (2019) and Making it Reindeer (Christmas 2018), for Bleacher Report

== Awards and honours ==
- The Austin Chronicle named Andrew Augustin as the best graphic designer in Austin, Texas in the 2007 Best of Austin award.
- Austin Hallock has named Super Ubie Land in the top 10 HTML5 games of 2013 list published on Gamasutra
- Augustin was listed in the 2015 Forbes' 30 Under 30 class in the games category at the age of 26.
- Augustin was listed in the 2015 Black Enterprise Modern Man list.
- Atlanta Blackstar named Augustin in their "5 African-Americans Making an Impact in the Video Game Industry" list.
- Featured in the September 29, 2015 issue of the Why I Work series for Wells Fargo's website.
- Interviewed in the December 5, 2016 issue of BlackSciFi.com.
- Selected to participate in the 2020 Play NYC Graffiti Games initiative
- Profiled in the November 24, 2020 issue of Voyage Austin.
- Highlighted as a game developer in the 2021 United States Science and Engineering Festival as a guest speaker at the event.
