= The Sims: Unleashed =

- Developer: Maxis (Note: Ported to Mac OS X by Westlake Interactive.)
- Publishers: Electronic Arts (PC); Aspyr Media (Mac)
- Platforms: Windows, Mac OS X
- Release: Windows: NA: September 25, 2002; AU: September 26, 2002; EU: October 4, 2002; Mac OS X: NA: January 2, 2003; EU: March 2003
- Genre: Social simulation
- Modes: Single-player, multiplayer

The Sims: Unleashed is a 2002 expansion pack developed by Maxis and published by Electronic Arts for The Sims. The fifth expansion pack for The Sims, Unleashed expands the game's neighborhood to include a community area named Old Town which allows players to purchase pets, including cats and dogs, and farm their own produce. Unleashed was announced by Electronic Arts in June 2002 and released in September, with a Macintosh port of the game published by Aspyr Media in December. Upon release, Unleashed received generally positive reviews from critics, with praise directed to the scope and variety of the gameplay additions in the new neighborhood and pet mechanics, although expressing disappointment at the limited degree of control and gameplay mechanics involving pets. The concept of owning pets would be later re-introduced in The Sims 2: Pets, The Sims 3: Pets, and The Sims 4: Cats & Dogs.

== Gameplay ==
Unleashed introduces an expanded default neighborhood, including residential lots and commercial lots in Old Town.

Unleashed expands the default residential neighborhood of The Sims with a new commercial district, Old Town, increasing the number of community lots from 10 to 40. Old Town features new lot types, including pet stores, gardening shops, and food service areas. Players can also rezone lots for residential or community use. As with community lots in other expansions including Hot Date, Sims can access Old Town lots by calling for transportation. The expansion introduces 125 new items, including 30 new pet and gardening objects, and objects for community lots. Five new careers are also introduced, for Animal Care, Circus, Culinary, Education and Fashion career paths.

In Unleashed, Sims can now adopt pets for their families, particularly dogs and cats, which count as members of a family and move independently. Pets can be adopted from the local adoption center. Players choose the pet's species, breed, and name. Players cannot choose their personality points; pets come with random personality points. The game also introduces pet birds, fish, turtles and iguanas that act as interactive objects. Sims can interact with pet dogs and cats in different ways, such as rubbing, playing and clapping. Other social moves include praising and scolding. Pets can also be trained to obey Sims, either by normal Sims or the local Pet Trainer, and can be entered into a pet show at community lots.

Unleashed introduces new mechanics for Sims to do gardening and farm produce. The expansion includes landscaping tiles that allow players to plant and cultivate seeds to sell at the Farmers Market or stored in a purchasable pantry. Sims maintain farmed produce by watering plants daily, removing weeds, and warding off pests including rabbits and gophers that can eat plants. Some plants, such as carrots and lettuce, require replanting after each harvest, whilst others, including tomatoes and beans, continue to grow after harvest without replanting.

== Reception ==
=== Sales ===
Unleashed was a commercial success upon release. The expansion was estimated by NPD sales charts as the 2nd best selling computer game of 2002 by units sold, outperformed only by The Sims: Vacation, and the 6th best-selling of 2003. The game also topped monthly sales charts, including NPD charts in the United States, ChartTrack and Virgin Megastores charts in Europe, and IEAA sales charts in Australia.

=== Reviews ===
Reception

Aggregate score
Aggregator	Score
Metacritic	79/100

Review scores
Publication	Score
AllGame	3.5/5
Computer Gaming World	5/5
Eurogamer	6/10
GameRevolution	B
GameSpot	8/10
GameSpy	4/5
IGN	7/10
PC Gamer (US)	78%
PC Zone	78%

According to review aggregator Metacritic, Unleashed received "generally favorable" reviews from critics. Critics generally praised the scope and variety of new content. Describing the expansion as making the game feel "brand-new", Elizabeth McAdams of Computer Gaming World commended the "variety and sheer size of the expanded neighborhood". Describing the expansion as the "best so far", Rhianna Pratchett of PC Zone praised the game's "hefty" additions as providing "a touch of the innovative spark of the original game". Andrew Park of GameSpot stated the game was a "worthwhile add-on" for fans, given the addition of "several major features" to the game. Jason Bates found the expansion of the game world to be a "pleasant surprise" with a "ton of brand new lots to play with".

The addition of pets received a mixed reception. Andrew Park of GameSpot considered pets to be "implemented extremely well" due to the range of options for training and social interaction. Elizabeth McAdams of Computer Gaming World found the feature to focus on "high-maintenance" tasks, although the needs of pets was less complex than other sims. Marc Saltzman of PC Gamer expressed disappointment that players did not have control over pets, stating that they "don't do much other than get taken care of". Tom Bramwell of Eurogamer found the addition of pets to a less significant gameplay feature that "never really goes anywhere", noting the distraction of pet routines that "can take time away from more important aspects" of the game". Jason Bates of IGN described the system as "disappointing" and "stubbornly rigid", commending the "involved and entertaining" features for cats and dogs, the ability to interact in "interesting and meaningful ways" with them, but found animals to have an overall disruptive presence on lots.

In line with earlier expansions, some critics found the expansion to offer diminishing returns on improving the core gameplay experience of The Sims. T.J. Deci noted that Unleashed did not seem to utilise its higher system requirements into improved graphics or features, a point shared by Andrew Park of GameSpot, who noted the expansion failed to "fix the core game's problems", and that the graphical engine was "showing its age" and featured Sims that looked "blocky as ever". Reviewers also noted the expansion also introduced several performance issues and bugs. T.J. Deci of Allgame expressed disappointment that the expansion introduced "gameplay defects" including "baffling" and "poor" Sim pathfinding, "slowdown and jerky animations". Marc Saltzman of PC Gamer observed "steep system requirements", and "clipping problems".

=== Accolades ===
Unleashed received the award for Computer Simulation Game of the Year at the 6th Annual Interactive Achievement Awards.
