= Hubert's Brain =

2001 animated short film

Hubert's Brain, made in 2001, is the first and only computer-generated film made by San Francisco digital media company Wild Brain. The movie is 17 minutes long, took one year and $3,000,000 to produce, and the movie won the 2001 Annie Award for Outstanding Achievement in an Animated Short Subject. It tells the story of a science geek who befriends a talking brain-in-a-jar.

Hubert's Brain was produced by Nina Rappaport, directed by Phil Robinson and Gordon Clark, and written by Brian Narelle and Robin Steele, with music by Michael A. Levine.

Credited voices include: Jonathan Harris, Peter Falk, Bruce Campbell, J. D. Daniels, Charles Howerton, and Gerri Lawlor.
