= The Urbz: Sims in the City =

2004 video game

- North American PlayStation 2 box art
- Developer: Maxis (Note: Game Boy Advance and Nintendo DS versions developed by Griptonite Games.)
- Publisher: Electronic Arts (Note: Released under the EA Games banner.)
- Series: The Sims
- Platforms: Game Boy Advance; GameCube; Nintendo DS; PlayStation 2; Xbox
- Release: November 5, 2004: PlayStation 2; AU: November 5, 2004; NA: November 9, 2004; EU: November 12, 2004 Game Boy Advance, GameCube; NA: November 9, 2004; EU: November 12, 2004 Xbox; NA/AU: November 9, 2004; EU: November 12, 2004 Nintendo DS; NA: November 17, 2004; EU: March 11, 2005
- Genre: Life simulation
- Modes: Single-player, multiplayer

The Urbz: Sims in the City is a 2004 life simulation video game developed by Maxis and published by Electronic Arts for the Game Boy Advance, GameCube, PlayStation 2, Xbox, and Nintendo DS. It is the third Sims game for consoles, and the second not to be released for Microsoft Windows, after a planned PC port and sequel were both cancelled due to mediocre sales. The next release for consoles and handhelds was the console port of The Sims 2.

For the console versions of the game, music group The Black Eyed Peas provided several music scores which were translated into Simlish; they also appeared as guest Urbz in the game. The Game Boy Advance and Nintendo DS versions have their own storylines, which are a sequel to the handheld version of The Sims Bustin' Out (2003).

== Plot ==
The Urbz: Sims in the City takes place in Urbzville. There are nine groups, each with unique styles and Sims. The aim of the game is to build "Rep" with allied Sims to gain popularity and access to VIP and other groups.

=== Console ===
In the console version of the game, the protagonist of the story moves from their mother's house to SimCity, where they move into an apartment in the city. In the intro, the protagonist decides to go clubbing. Once the protagonist gets to the club, they are refused entry due to failing at performing a dance move. However, will.i.am of the Black Eyed Peas, along with the other members of the band, arrive at the club and help the protagonist enter. After the intro, a few days later, the protagonist goes home and is greeted by Will and his friend Darius, who is the most popular person in SimCity. After showing off their guitar moves, Darius welcomes the protagonist to the city and they leave. Later on, it is discovered that Darius is missing parts from his secret machine. He promises the protagonist that if they find the parts, he will have a special surprise for them. After defeating the villains in the game's districts, the protagonist is asked to come to the penthouse owned by Darius. After arriving at the penthouse, they are greeted by Darius, along with the faction bosses from the city districts, and are given a key by Darius to the penthouse. Afterwards, Darius leaves the city on his blimp to travel to Miniopolis (the setting of the handheld version of the game).

=== Handheld ===
The handheld version of the game plays as a sequel to the Game Boy Advance and N-Gage releases of The Sims Bustin' Out. Unlike the console versions, the Black Eyed Peas do not appear in this game. The protagonist, who recently arrived in the city from SimValley via rocket, is fired after the original King Tower owner and player's old boss, Harlan King, sells the tower to Daddy Bigbucks. After a failed attempt to steal a key from Lily Gates, the assistant of Daddy Bigbucks, the player is arrested by Detective Dan D. Mann and taken to jail. After convincing Detective Dan to let the player go, they are put on probation and prohibited from leaving the Urban area of the city. After doing certain tasks, they are recruited by Gramma Hattie to lead a strike to open the city bridges to Sim Quarter. Afterwards, they are knocked off of a ship by Bigbucks and wash up in the Bayou, where the player is mistaken by its inhabitants, the twins Bayou Boo and Crawdad Clem, as being a vampire. The twins help the player get home; however, Bayou Boo is bitten by a vampire and turns into one. Upon the player's return to Sim Quarter, they are informed by Gramma Hattie that Daddy Bigbucks took over the city and has outlawed running. She then gives the player a cookbook in order to help them make chocolate, which cures Bayou Boo's vampirism. Later on, the protagonist and Gramma Hattie are arrested for running, but are let go by the Sheriff. Eventually, the protagonist arrives in Glasstown and finds Harlan. The player discovers that Daddy Bigbucks has built a time machine to stake a claim to land in the past, so that he will own it in the present. With the help of Ewan Watahmee and Sue Pirnova, the player makes their own time machine and uses it to thwart his plans. Daddy Bigbucks is banished to an island outside of the city called Nutria Island, and a lifelike statue of the protagonist is built in the city center.

== Development ==
Development of the console version of the game was carried out by Maxis from 2002 to 2004. It was initially planned to be the first Sims game on consoles; however, Edge of Reality developed a remake of the original game for the PlayStation 2, Xbox and GameCube, and it was released in 2002. Maxis then split the Urbz team in two. One team focused on the development of a console sequel to the console version of The Sims, which eventually became The Sims Bustin' Out and released in 2003 on the PlayStation 2, Xbox and GameCube consoles, with a version developed for the Game Boy Advance and Nokia NGage by Griptonite Games (who would also develop The Urbz portable), while the other focused on The Urbz. During development, Electronic Arts wanted to get the game some more publicity, so the Electronic Arts division, EA Trax, contracted with The Black Eyed Peas, who at that time had recently shot to mainstream fame after their recruitment of Fergie and release of Elephunk. The Black Eyed Peas recorded a majority of the game's soundtrack, producing new songs exclusive to The Urbz, while also recording Simlish versions of "Shut Up" and "Let's Get It Started", both of which appeared on Elephunk. The game went gold in June 2004 and was shipped to stores in late November 2004.

According to a former Maxis employee, an Urbz 2, as well as a PC port of The Urbz, were both planned if the game was successful. Electronic Arts wanted The Urbz to be a spin-off breakout series, similar to how The Sims was a spin-off breakout series of SimCity. Unfortunately, the game did not sell as many copies as Electronic Arts wanted, so the PC port was cancelled, and the sequel eventually was reworked into a console version of The Sims 2, which released in 2005. Assets, as well as a logo, were left over in the PlayStation 2 version of The Sims 2 and can be viewed with a model viewer.

== Gameplay ==
=== Console ===
The gameplay is similar to The Sims Bustin' Out, and the objective of the console games is to go to each of nine districts and build their reputation (called "Rep" in-game). Rep is a measure of how popular a character is; as the character gains more Rep, they gain access to larger apartments and different districts. In the end, the character will have the largest apartment and be able to visit any of the districts.

In addition to gaining Rep, the player must also make sure that their character has its needs fulfilled, and to increase the character's skills by playing minigames. The amount of money Sims can make at the various jobs in each of the districts is determined by what skills they've leveled up. As they progress through the game, players will get messages for rent from Darius, the Sim with the highest rep in the city, and get programmed messages to their XAM. Other challenges, like helping Urbz, gain the player income.

The player will be given different tasks depending on the district they are in. The tasks are varied in nature, including fulfilling needs, furnishing an apartment, building reputation, mastering a job, making friends, tagging an object, and helping other Urbz.

=== Handheld ===
The handheld versions are played as an adventure game, similar to the handheld releases of The Sims Bustin' Out, and give the player direct control of the character "Urb". The goal of the Nintendo DS and Game Boy Advance versions is to complete the five missions included. The versions are largely similar, but the Nintendo DS version includes an additional, exclusive mission and location that is not found on the Game Boy Advance version. Like the other games of The Sims franchise, an Urb has eight basic needs. In order to succeed in the handheld versions of this game, these needs must be kept high and steady.

There are four different "Rep Groups" in the game: Richies, Artsies, Streeties, and Nerdies. The player is assigned to one in the beginning of the game, but it can later be changed with the completion of certain objectives. There are three districts that can be unlocked upon completing certain sets of goals. Once the player has beaten the game, they are free to live in any of the houses or apartments in the game so long as they have enough money.

== Soundtrack ==
The Urbz console soundtrack was released digitally on last.fm as an album for download in March 2007. Most of the game's soundtrack is present; however, due to licensing issues with A&M Records, music recorded by hip hop group The Black Eyed Peas was not present on the album. A physical release was planned by EA, but was cancelled after poor sales of the game.

== Reception ==
Reception

Aggregate score
| Aggregator | Score | | | | |
| Aggregator | DS | GBA | GameCube | PS2 | Xbox |
|---|---|---|---|---|---|
| Metacritic | 67/100 | 72/100 | 73/100 | 70/100 | 70/100 |

Review scores
| Publication | Score | | | | |
| Publication | DS | GBA | GameCube | PS2 | Xbox |
|---|---|---|---|---|---|
| Electronic Gaming Monthly | 8.5/10 | N/A | 6.5/10 | 6.5/10 | 6.5/10 |
| Eurogamer | N/A | N/A | N/A | N/A | 5/10 |
| Famitsu | 28/40 | 29/40 | 26/40 | 26/40 | N/A |
| Game Informer | 8/10 | 7.5/10 | 7.75/10 | 7.75/10 | 7.75/10 |
| GamePro | N/A | N/A | 4/5 | 4/5 | 4/5 |
| GameRevolution | B | N/A | N/A | N/A | N/A |
| GameSpot | 7.3/10 | 7.5/10 | 7.3/10 | 7.3/10 | 7.3/10 |
| GameSpy | N/A | 2/5 | 4/5 | 4/5 | 4/5 |
| GameZone | N/A | N/A | N/A | 7.1/10 | 7.5/10 |
| IGN | 7/10 | 8/10 | 7.5/10 | 7.5/10 | 7.5/10 |
| Nintendo Power | 3.8/5 | 3.9/5 | 3.6/5 | N/A | N/A |
| Official U.S. PlayStation Magazine | N/A | N/A | N/A | 3.5/5 | N/A |
| Official Xbox Magazine (US) | N/A | N/A | N/A | N/A | 6.4/10 |
| Detroit Free Press | N/A | N/A | N/A | 2/4 | N/A |
| The Sydney Morning Herald | N/A | N/A | N/A | 2/5 | N/A |

The game received "average" reviews on all platforms according to the review aggregation website Metacritic. In Japan, where the handheld versions were ported for release on December 2, 2004, followed by the GameCube and PlayStation 2 versions on January 13, 2005, Famitsu gave it a score of 29 out of 40 for the Game Boy Advance version, 28 out of 40 for the DS version, and 26 out of 40 each for the latter two console versions.
