= The Sims (video game) =

2000 video game

- Windows cover art
- Developer: Maxis (Note: Mac OS version developed by Westlake Interactive; console versions developed by Edge of Reality.)
- Publisher: Electronic Arts (Note: Published for consoles under the EA Games label): Mac OS Aspyr Media Linux TransGaming
- Producer: Kana Ryan
- Designer: Will Wright
- Programmers: Jeffrey Charvat; Jim Mackraz
- Artist: Charles London
- Writer: Sean Baity
- Composers: Jerry Martin; Marc Russo
- Series: The Sims
- Platforms: Windows, Mac OS, Mac OS X, PlayStation 2, Linux, GameCube, Xbox (Note: The Xbox version of this game is not compatible with Xbox 360.)
- Release: February 4, 2000: Windows; NA: February 4, 2000; EU: February 11, 2000 Mac OS; NA: July 18, 2000 Mac OS X support; NA: July 29, 2001 PlayStation 2; NA: January 14, 2003; EU: January 31, 2003 Linux; NA: March 12, 2003 GameCube, Xbox; NA: March 25, 2003; EU: April 4, 2003
- Genre: Social simulation
- Modes: Single-player, multiplayer

The Sims is a 2000 social simulation video game developed by Maxis and published by Electronic Arts. Designed by Will Wright, the game allows players to create and control virtual people called Sims, build and furnish homes, and manage the Sims' needs, relationships, careers, and household finances. Its open-ended gameplay has no fixed win condition.

Wright conceived the game after his work on the SimCity series. The project drew on architecture and design theory, including Christopher Alexander's A Pattern Language, and began as an architecture-oriented simulation before the development team shifted its focus toward the simulated people themselves. Seven expansion packs were released between 2000 and 2003.

The Sims received widespread critical acclaim and became a major commercial success. In 2002, Electronic Arts announced that it had surpassed Myst as the best-selling PC game at the time, with more than 6.3 million copies sold worldwide; by September 2004, combined sales of the game and its expansions had passed 41 million units. It won several Game of the Year awards and has been cited as one of the most influential video games of all time. It was followed by The Sims 2 (2004), The Sims 3 (2009), and The Sims 4 (2014). Electronic Arts re-released the game for modern Windows PCs in 2025 as The Sims Legacy Collection.

== Gameplay ==
The Sims is an artificial life game built around simulated characters who respond to needs, objects, and other Sims. Although Sims can act autonomously when free will is enabled, the player usually directs their actions, manages their household, and decides how they develop relationships, skills, careers, and homes. Because the game has no fixed win condition, it can be played indefinitely and has been described as more like a toy than a traditional game.

Sims are influenced by the player to interact with objects or other Sims. Sims may receive guests at their home lot, invited or not, from other playable lots, or from unhoused non-player character (NPC) Sims. If enabled in the game's options, Sims have a certain amount of free will, allowing them to autonomously interact with their world; however, the player can override most of these autonomous actions by canceling them in the action queue at the top of the screen. Unlike the simulated environments in games such as SimCity, SimEarth, or SimLife, Sims are not fully autonomous. They are unable to take certain actions without specific commands, such as paying bills, finding a job, exercising, and conceiving children. Sims communicate in a fictional language called Simlish, which is mostly composed of blowing raspberries and saying nonsense.

A lazy and sloppy Sim

The player can make decisions about time spent in skill development, such as exercise, reading, creativity, and logic by adding activities to Sims' daily agenda. Daily needs such as hygiene and eating can and must also be scheduled. Although Sims can autonomously perform these actions, they may not prioritize them effectively and can suffer consequences for neglecting their own needs. In addition, Sims must maintain balanced budgets and usually supplement an income by obtaining a job. Sims may earn promotions by fulfilling skills and maintaining friendships with others for each level, which lead to new job titles, increased wages, and different work hours. Alternatively, Sims may create and sell various artwork and items at home.

The original neighborhood in The Sims consists of a single screen displaying all playable lots.

Although there is no final objective, several failure states exist in The Sims. Sims can die if their needs are neglected or after accidents, and deaths are represented in-game by an urn or tombstone. Sims can also permanently leave a household after conflict, children can be sent to military school after prolonged poor grades, and neglected babies can be removed by a social care worker.

=== Building tools ===
In Live mode, the player controls Sims directly, while Build and Buy modes pause time and allow the player to construct, renovate, and furnish lots. When the game begins, each family starts with 20,000 simoleons, regardless of its number of members. These funds can be used to purchase a small house or vacant lot on the neighborhood screen. After purchasing a lot, the player may construct or remodel a house in Build mode or purchase and move furniture in Buy mode. Architectural elements and furnishings follow a square-tile system in which items must be placed on tiles. Walls and fences extend along the edge of a tile and can follow the edge of the tile or cross it diagonally, but furniture items cannot be placed on either side of a crossed tile. The base game contains more than 150 items, including furniture and architectural elements.

The building system originated in the game's early design as an architecture simulator, in which the Sims existed mainly to evaluate houses. During development, the team decided that the Sims were more interesting than originally anticipated and expanded their role in the game. Players can purchase objects in eight broad categories: seating, surfaces, decorations, electronics, appliances, plumbing, lighting, and miscellaneous.

== Development ==
The original inspiration for The Sims was Christopher Alexander's 1977 book on architecture and urban design, A Pattern Language. Game designer Will Wright was inspired by the book's focus on functionality in architecture, as Alexander based his design principles on structural usability rather than aesthetic values. Wright wanted to create a simulation game about enabling human behavior and interaction through design. Scott McCloud's 1993 book Understanding Comics became a big influence on the design of The Sims later on, as it advocates a certain type of "collaboration" between designer and consumer and outlines the value of abstraction for getting readers or players involved with a story.

Will Wright started working on The Sims after releasing SimAnt in 1991. It was during that same year that he lost his home during the Oakland firestorm of 1991, and he incorporated his experience of rebuilding his life into the game; however, the game's concept was very poorly received by a focus group, so Wright had difficulty getting the project off the ground. He managed to convince his company to let him work on the project (codenamed "Project X" at the time) in the background while developing SimCity 2000 and SimCopter. He was lent one programmer for the project, Jamie Doornbos, who went on to become the lead programmer for The Sims. During the first few years of the project, Wright and Doornbos were primarily developing an open-ended system of character behavior. As the project continued, Wright found that the social aspect of the game turned out to be highly engaging, and the team started to focus more on the characters of the game, such as by letting Sims visit one another's houses and by implementing long-term relationships.

Wright has mentioned playing Little Computer People and receiving valuable feedback on The Sims from several people involved with the game including its designer, Rich Gold. A demo of the game was presented at the 1999 Electronic Entertainment Expo. During a demonstration for the press, two female characters at an in-game wedding fell in love and kissed each other. After the event, the relationship mechanics were further modified so the character's sexual orientation was determined depending on the player's actions. The Sims uses a combination of 3D and 2D graphics techniques. The Sims themselves are rendered in 3D, whereas the house and all its objects are pre-rendered and displayed dimetrically. For the game's Japanese release, the game was renamed to SimPeople (シムピープル) to match the naming conventions of the other Sim games from Maxis.

=== Music ===
The game music was composed by Jerry Martin, Marc Russo, Kirk R. Casey, and Dix Bruce, with additional participation from jazz pianist John R. Burr for the songs used in the game's Build Mode. The game disc contains 37 tracks, of which 15 were published in 2007 as an official soundtrack album. Most of the tracks contain no vocals, but some of them feature Simlish lyrics.

In later commentary, Alex Robert Ross of Vice highlighted the soundtrack's use of new age and jazz piano, particularly the Build Mode music.

=== Modding support ===
The Sims is credited with opening modding to a new demographic by making the game accessible to "casual modders". The game was designed to make user-created content, also known as custom content, easy to add, and Wright stated that he wanted to put players in the design role. Maxis released modding tools for The Sims before the game itself, resulting in a suite of fan-created mods being available at launch.

== Release ==
=== Expansion packs ===
The Sims had a total of seven expansion packs released during its original release cycle. Each expansion generally added new items, neighborhoods, characters, skins, and features.

Name	Release date	Description
Livin' Large (known as Livin' It Up in Europe)	NA: August 31, 2000	Adds new unconventional characters, careers, items, and features for the home.
House Party	NA: April 2, 2001; NA: October 4, 2002 (reissue)	Gives players the ability and facilities to hold parties and gatherings in their Sims' homes. Drew Carey makes a cameo appearance in the game if the player's Sims hold a good enough party.
Hot Date	NA: November 12, 2001	Adds new items, characters, and the ability for Sims to leave their homes and travel to new destinations. Adds new destination, "Downtown", composed of ten new lots. Introduces a revamped relationship system involving short- and long-term relationships. Adds ability to carry inventory and give gifts to other Sims.
Vacation (known as On Holiday in the UK, Ireland, China, Portugal, and Scandinavia)	NA: March 28, 2002	Introduces a new destination called "Vacation Island" where Sims can take vacations with family members or with other Sims and marks the first time Sims can stay on lots away from home. Adds the ability to save the game while a Sim is on Vacation Island. Allows Sims to purchase or find souvenirs, stay at a hotel, or rent a tent/igloo.
Unleashed	NA: November 7, 2002	Introduces pets into the game. Allows dogs and cats to be treated as Sims rather than objects. Introduces gardening and expands original ten-lot neighborhood to over forty lots, with the added ability to rezone these lots for residential or community use. Allows community lots to be modified to shops, cafes, and other commercial establishments.
Superstar	NA: May 13, 2003	Allows Sims to become entertainment figures and includes representations of several famous personalities. Celebrities can make cameo appearances but cannot be controlled by the player. Adds new work and leisure items, and a new destination called "Studio Town", which functions as a workplace for celebrity Sims. Allows non-celebrity Sims to visit Studio Town for leisure.
Makin' Magic	NA: October 29, 2003	Introduces magic to the game and allows Sims to cast spells, forge charms, and buy alchemical ingredients. Introduces the Magic Town lots, which house vendors of magical ingredients and items and a number of magic-related mini-games. Introduces baking and nectar-making. Adds additional residential lots in Magic Town.

=== Editions and compilations ===
Name	Release date	Includes
The Sims	Windows: NA: February 4, 2000; EU: February 11, 2000; Mac OS: July 18, 2000; Mac OS X support: July 29, 2001; Linux: March 12, 2003	The first release of the core game on a single CD. 2001 international reissues came with an additional disc containing digital documentation.
The Sims Collector's Edition	Windows: EU: March 23, 2001	The core game, The Sims: Livin' it Up and the 2001 documentation disc.
The Sims Party Pack	Windows: EU: 2001	The core game, The Sims: House Party and the 2001 documentation disc.
The Sims Deluxe Edition	Windows: NA: October 4, 2002; EU: 2002	Contains an updated version of the core game, The Sims: Livin' Large, The Sims Creator and exclusive items and clothing on a two-disc installation. It can also be installed as an expansion for existing game owners.
The Sims Double Deluxe	Windows: NA: October 10, 2003; EU: 2003	The Sims Deluxe Edition, The Sims: House Party, and a disc containing African and Asian-themed items and previously-downloadable items from the game's website.
The Sims Mega Deluxe	Windows: NA: May 25, 2004; Mac OS X: NA: May 25, 2004; EU: 2004	The Sims Double Deluxe and The Sims: Hot Date. The PC version was exclusive to North America, while the Mac OS X version, known as The Sims Party Pack, was released internationally.
The Sims Triple Deluxe	Windows: EU: June 18, 2004	The Sims Double Deluxe and The Sims: On Holiday.
The Sims Full House	Windows: AU: 2004	The core game, all seven expansions, a disc of digital documentation and an extra disc containing preview footage from The Sims 2 within a thirteen-disc boxset.
The Complete Collection of The Sims	Windows: EU: 2005	The Sims Triple Deluxe, The Sims: Hot Date, The Sims: Unleashed, The Sims: Superstar and The Sims: Makin' Magic within a twelve-disc boxset.
The Sims Complete Collection	Windows: NA: November 1, 2005; EU: 2005	The core game, all seven expansions, The Sims Creator and bonus content from Deluxe Edition and Double Deluxe on a four-disc installation.
The Sims Legacy Collection	Windows 10/11: January 31, 2025	Re-release of Complete Collection, containing the core game, all seven expansions and bonus content from Deluxe Edition and Double Deluxe.

=== Expansion-only compilations ===
Collection Name	Windows release date	Volumes
The Sims Expansion Collection	March 15, 2005	Volume One – The Sims: House Party and The Sims: Unleashed; Volume Two – The Sims: Hot Date and The Sims: Makin' Magic; Volume Three – The Sims: Vacation and The Sims: Superstar
The Sims Expansion Three-Pack	November 1, 2005	Volume One – The Sims: House Party, The Sims: Unleashed, and The Sims: Superstar; Volume Two – The Sims: Hot Date, The Sims: Vacation, and The Sims: Makin' Magic

=== Legacy Collection ===
On January 31, 2025, Electronic Arts re-released the game for Windows 10 and 11 as The Sims Legacy Collection through the EA app, Epic Games Store, and Steam. The collection includes the base game and all seven expansion packs: Livin' Large, House Party, Hot Date, Vacation, Unleashed, Superstar, and Makin' Magic.

The re-release received criticism from players for technical problems, with PC Gamer reporting complaints about crashes, bugs, user-interface scaling, and limited modernization; EA subsequently released patches addressing stability, performance, display, input, and window-management issues.

== Reception ==
=== Critical reception ===
Reception

Aggregate scores
Aggregator	Score
GameRankings	(PC) 90% (PS2) 81% (Xbox) 82% (GCN) 86%
Metacritic	(PC) 92/100

Review scores
Publication	Score
AllGame	5/5 (Windows); 5/5 (Macintosh)
Electronic Gaming Monthly	9.5/10, 8.5/10, 8/10 (PS2)
GamePro	5/5
GameSpot	9.1/10
IGN	9.5/10
Next Generation	4/5

Awards
Publication	Award
Interactive Achievement Awards	Game of the Year; Outstanding Achievement in Game Design; Outstanding Achievement in Game Play Engineering
GameSpot	Game of the Year
Game Developers Choice Awards	Game of the Year
IGN	Best Simulation

The Sims received "universal acclaim" according to review aggregator Metacritic, which assigned the game a score of 92/100. The game received praise for its open-ended gameplay allowing players to choose their own goals and objectives, as well as its sound design, "crisp" graphics, and humor. Reviewers positively compared The Sims to Maxis' 1999 title SimCity 3000. GameSpot scored the game 9.1/10, describing it as "highly detailed". IGN gave the game a score of 9.5/10, and praised its easy-to-use user interface. Jeff Lundrigan reviewed the PC version of the game for Next Generation, rating it four stars out of five and saying: "Do not miss. Run do not walk. And set aside lots of time."

Will Wright, the game's designer, said the game has been a success in many ways—attracting casual gamers and female gamers (the latter making up almost 60% of players). In 2012, the game was one of 14 video games selected by the Museum of Modern Art as the basis for an intended collection of 40 games. The PlayStation 2, Xbox, and GameCube ports received scores ranging from 81.05% to 85.80% on GameRankings.

=== Sales ===
The Sims was released on February 4, 2000, and became a best-seller shortly after launch. In the United States, it was the best-selling computer game of 2000, with domestic sales of 1.77 million units and revenues of $72.9 million. It remained the country's No. 1 computer title in 2001, when it sold an additional 1.48 million units and earned another $60.4 million in revenue. In 2002, The Sims became the top-selling PC game in history at the time, displacing Myst by selling more than 6.3 million copies worldwide.

By September 2004, the game and its expansions had sold 41 million copies worldwide. By July 2006, the console versions of The Sims series had sold a combined 3.5 million units in the United States. Next Generation ranked The Sims as the 45th highest-selling game launched for the PlayStation 2, Xbox, or GameCube between January 2000 and July 2006 in the United States. A 2008 Eurogamer retrospective estimated that the original game had sold more than 50 million copies worldwide, or about 70 million copies when expansion packs were included.

=== Awards and recognition ===
The Sims has won numerous awards, including GameSpot's "Game of the Year Award" for 2000. During the 3rd Annual Interactive Achievement Awards (since 2013 known as the D.I.C.E. Awards), The Sims won "Game of the Year", "Outstanding Achievement in Game Design", and "Outstanding Achievement in Game Play Engineering" (along with nominations for "Computer Family Entertainment Title of the Year" and "Outstanding Achievement in Art Direction"). Game Informer ranked it the 80th best game ever made in its 100th issue in 2001. In 2005, The Sims was inducted into GameSpot's list of the greatest games of all time. In 2016, The Strong National Museum of Play inducted The Sims to its World Video Game Hall of Fame. In August 2016, The Sims placed 31st on Time's "50 Best Video Games of All Time" list. In 2019, it was ranked 17th on The Guardian's "50 Best Video Games of the 21st Century" list.

== Sequels and legacy ==
The Sims was followed by the sequels The Sims 2 (2004), The Sims 3 (2009), and The Sims 4 (2014). The console versions of The Sims were each followed by a sequel, The Sims Bustin' Out (2003), and a spin-off game, The Urbz: Sims in the City (2004). These versions incorporate some features of later PC expansion packs, and Bustin' Out adds a multiplayer mode supporting two simultaneous players. When completing the game, Will Wright dedicated The Sims to the late Danielle Bunten Berry, an influential trans game designer known for her innovation and contributions to multiplayer gaming.

== See also ==
- Simulated reality
- Simulation
