= The Sims: Livin' Large =

- North American cover featuring new non-player characters and careers introduced in the expansion
- Developer: Maxis (Note: Mac OS port developed by Westlake Interactive.)
- Publishers: Electronic Arts (PC); Aspyr Media (Mac)
- Platforms: Windows; Mac OS
- Release: Windows: NA: August 29, 2000; EU: September 8, 2000; Mac OS: NA: November 21, 2000; EU: August 2001
- Genre: Social simulation
- Modes: Single-player, multiplayer

The Sims: Livin' Large (released in Europe as The Sims: Livin' It Up) is a 2000 expansion to The Sims developed by Maxis and published by Electronic Arts. The first of several expansions to The Sims, Livin' Large introduces several new objects and architecture features, new characters and careers. The expansion was designed with a more humorous and unusual tone to broaden the creative direction and scenarios in the game. Upon release, Livin' Large received generally positive reviews from critics, with praise directed to the unique and unusual range of interactive objects, and criticism to the expansion's largely cosmetic approach. In 2002, Livin' Large was combined with the original game and packaged by Electronic Arts with additional bonus content as The Sims Deluxe Edition.

== Gameplay ==
Livin' Large introduces a number of new decorative and interactive objects to The Sims.

Primarily a content-based expansion, Livin' Large adds 125 new items for Sims to purchase in the game's "Buy Mode". Some items are decorative, and others are interactive. Some interactive items feature additional effects and new non-player characters, including a magic lamp that, when rubbed, spawns a genie that can grant the player wishes with random good or bad outcomes, a chemistry lab that can create potions with positive and negative effects, including turning the drinker into a monster, and a robotic servitor that can assist with housework. Sims can contract a potentially fatal illness from a bite from the guinea pig included in this expansion. The "Vibromatic Heart Bed" allows players to engage their Sims in intimate relationships for the first time in the series, with a male and female Sim in love able to "Vibrate" the bed and then "Play" in it. Doing so will provide a chance that the female Sim will become pregnant with a baby. Livin' Large also features five new career paths: Slacker, Hacker, Journalist, Paranormal and Musician. The expansion expands the default number of lots in the game by increasing the number of neighborhoods.

Livin' Large introduces complex interactions with two non-player characters: the Tragic Clown and Grim Reaper. The Tragic Clown is a character that spawns if the painting of the same name is placed on the lot and an occupant is on the lot. If the Tragic Clown appears, he will attempt to cheer the player by performing tricks and always fail, decreasing the Sim's mood even further. Removing the Tragic Clown requires the player to raise the mood of all Sims on the lot, or set the painting on fire. The Grim Reaper is a character that appears when a Sim dies, interacting with the corpse to remove the Sim from the game. Other Sims can interact with the Grim Reaper and "Plead" to save the life of the Sim before the Reaper has removed them. This prompts a game of rock paper scissors in which, if won, the dead Sim will be revived or, if lost, the dead Sim will either be removed or be turned into a zombie.

== Development and release ==
The design objective of Livin' Large was to introduce new elements to the game that created gameplay and stories that "further engaged the imagination of the player". Lead designer Will Wright stated that the expansion focused on a "novel humour" and "wacky style" in contrast with the "neutral" tone of the original game in order to help "spark the creativity of players" and "take the game into weird, twisted directions". Wright took a reduced role in the design of the expansion to focus on The Sims Online, with codesigner Chris Trottier having a stronger responsibility for the implementation of the game, although the Tragic Clown was Wright's "pet object" for suggested inclusion in the expansion. Electronic Arts engaged studio New Pencil Incorporated to create new assets for Livin' Large and future expansions. Development of the expansion was streamlined by using asset libraries to introduce sets of objects and architecture with a similar "look and feel", such as the set of castle-themed items. Some skins were created as user-made modifications and selected by designers for inclusion in the game.

Livin' Large was published by EA on August 29 in North America and September 8 in Europe. Aspyr Media announced and released a Mac port for the game in November 2000. In 2002, EA released The Sims Deluxe, a combination of The Sims and Livin' Large, with additional clothing options and The Sims Creator tool.

== Reception ==
=== Sales ===
Domestically, Livin' Large sold 263,076 units and earned $6.99 million by the end of October 2000, according to PC Data. By the end of the year, its sales totaled 595,410 units ($16.1 million) in the United States alone. This made it the country's sixth-best-selling computer game of 2000. Livin' Large remained the United States' sixth-highest computer game seller in 2001, with domestic sales of 818,600 units and revenues of $22.9 million that year.

=== Reviews ===
Reception

Aggregate score
| Aggregator | Score |
|---|---|
| Metacritic | 82/100 |

Review scores
| Publication | Score |
|---|---|
| Computer Gaming World | 4.5/5 |
| GamePro | 4.5/5 |
| GameSpot | 8.1/10 |
| GameSpy | 82% |
| GameZone | 9/10 |
| Hyper | 79% |
| IGN | 7.5/10 |
| PC Gamer (US) | 85% |
| PC PowerPlay | 88% |
| CDMag | 3/5 |

The Sims: Livin' Large received "generally favorable" reviews from critics according to review aggregator Metacritic. Critics generally praised the distinctive gameplay and object additions. Many reviews noted the additions reinforced a stranger and more light-hearted tone, with Andrew Park of GameSpot highlighting the "exciting" and "absurd" side effects of many new objects, and Brian Wright of GamePro noting the "crazy settings" of the gothic and space-age design themes. Vincent Lopez of IGN commended the "weirder aspects" of the expansion, stating they made the game "a little more surreal than in the original title" and helped the player create "weirder" families, scenarios and storylines. Carl Salminen of Ars Technica acknowledged that the additions added a "new dimension to the game", but noted whilst some players would enjoy the "randomness and element of chaos" to gameplay, others would find them frustrating.

Many reviewers noted the additions of Livin' Large were mostly cosmetic aspects of the expansion and did not fundamentally alter the core mechanics of gameplay, with Vincent Lopez of IGN describing the game as a "new wallpaper on the same walls" of The Sims. Cam Shea of Hyper critiqued the expansion for not fixing technical issues with the game, including pathfinding bugs. Some critics also noted that many of the expansion's additions were similar to user-created downloadable objects, undermining their need. However, Andrew Park of GameSpot noted that the expansion did not aim to "make drastic improvements on the core game" and succeeded in its purpose of adding new content, furnishing and options to the game for players.
