= The Sims: Hot Date =

- Developer: Maxis (Note: Ported to Mac OS by Westlake Interactive.)
- Publishers: Electronic Arts (PC); Aspyr Media (Mac)
- Platforms: Windows, Mac OS
- Release: Windows: NA: 13 November 2001; EU: 23 November 2001; Mac OS: NA: 10 June 2002; EU: July 2002
- Genre: Social simulation
- Modes: Single-player, multiplayer

The Sims: Hot Date is a 2001 expansion pack for The Sims developed by Maxis and published by Electronic Arts. The expansion adds a new community area to the game, Downtown, and provides players with more opportunities for their Sims to interact and romance one another. Upon release, Hot Date received generally favorable reviews, with praise directed to the game's expansion of game mechanics and locations in contrast to earlier expansions, although with some criticism of the limited options for customisation and the level of challenge with relationship management. Following release, Hot Date was a commercial success, becoming one of the top ten highest-selling computer games of 2001 and 2002 in the United States.

== Gameplay ==
Hot Date introduces the Downtown area, allowing Sims to interact with multiple non-player characters named "Townies".

Hot Date was the first expansion pack to allow the player to visit another lot with their Sim. It introduces a new Downtown area for Sims to visit, with ten lots the player can bulldoze or edit outside of play mode. In play mode, Sims can now use their telephones to call a taxi that takes them to downtown SimCity, which has restaurants, shops, parks, and a few beachfront lots. In Downtown, Sims can meet Townies, non-player characters the players Sims can socialize with. Most of the townies are randomly generated based on the skins in the skin folder, but a couple of them are "archetypes" with a preset appearance and personality, like the Flirt, the Partier, or the nerdy Wallflower.

Hot Date revises the relationship mechanics of the game. Instead of one relationship bar to show how a Sim feels about another Sim, there's now two bars, one for short-term relationships and one for long-term relationship. The long-term relationship bar changes based on the short-term relationship, but can also be raised by successful romantic interactions. With Hot Date, mood plays a larger role in how a Sim reacts to social interactions. The expansion includes over 40 new social interactions, such as new hugs and kisses, as well as negative interactions like nagging or insulting. The mood of a Sim determines what social interactions are available. It also includes 8 new interests, among them romance, politics, and art, which decide what the Sims are interested in talking about. Sims can buy magazines to expand their interests.

The expansion pack includes 125 new objects, like the picnic basket, lovetub and lovers swing. It also allows players to place ceiling items for the first time.

== Development and release ==
The core objective of Hot Date for developer Maxis was to "get Sims out of the house", and "creating more interesting places for your Sims to go and giving them a much greater range of interactions". In order to facilitate the overhaul of the interaction system, the developers added a daily and lifetime relationship rating due to it being perceived as "too easy to get high relationships" in the original game. Because of the expanded scope of the project, Maxis expanded an additional team of 12-14 staff to develop the expansion, including contracting studio New Pencil, who created most of the sprite assets for the game. Development of Hot Date was completed on 3 November 2001 and shipped on 14 November.

== Reception ==
=== Sales ===
Hot Date was a commercial success and one of the highest-selling computer games of 2001 and 2002. According to NPD annual sales charts for computer games, Hot Date ranked as the seventh highest selling game in 2001 and fifth highest in 2002, with the Entertainment Software Association similarly ranking the game sixth in 2002. The game topped monthly ChartTrack and Virgin Megastores sales charts for computer games in January 2002 in the United Kingdom.

=== Reviews ===
Reception

Aggregate score
Aggregator	Score
Metacritic	85/100

Review scores
Publication	Score
Computer Games Magazine	4.5/5
Computer Gaming World	4.5/5
GameRevolution	8/10
GameSpot	8.8/10
GameSpy	87%
GameZone	8/10
Hyper	84%
IGN	8.4/10
PC Gamer (US)	80%
PC Zone	71%

According to review aggregator Metacritic, Hot Date received "generally favorable" reviews from critics. Several critics considered the expansion to be more substantial in content than its predecessors, Livin' Large and House Party, with Mark Hill of PC Zone describing the game as a "significant addition", and Cam Shea of Hyper finding the game to be a "breakthrough" that "truly [offers] something more than just extra frills and gimmicks". Elizabeth McAdams wrote that "there's enough going on to actually make it feel like a new Sims game", stating "this is the add-on Maxis should have released long ago". Vincent Lopez of IGN stated the expansion was not a "full-fledged leap", but was "certainly the largest step the game has taken".

The additions to romance and social interaction were generally praised. Describing the new mechanics as making "interaction between your characters a huge game in itself", Vince Lopez found the features to facilitate "more elaborate and fulfilling interaction". Cam Shea commended the new interactions for "significantly broadening the way sims interact". Elizabeth McAdams of Computer Gaming World highlighted the greater variation of Sim interactions and interests, but found dating to be addictive but too challenging. Similarly, Carla Harker of GameSpy considered long-term relationships to be time-consuming and difficult to maintain, noting that whilst it added realism to the game, it in turn increased the difficulty of career requirements. Nebojsa Radakovic of Game Revolution stated that "addition of expanded conversation options, physical interactions and interests makes it much harder for your Sim to win friends, but it is a much more rewarding experience", considering it to add "depth" and "drama" to the game.

The Downtown neighborhood was also generally praised, but was noted to be limited in its design options. Describing it as the "most significant addition that's ever been made to the game", Andrew Park of GameSpot found it necessary to manage work and relationships, lamenting the existence of a single area compared to neighborhoods but noting the lots were large enough to "provide enough areas to build and customize". However, Nebojsa Radakovic of Game Revolution critiqued the area, stating "the default lots are generally to sparse and the fun too far and few between", also writing that creating custom lots lacked the potential for "unique establishments" due to the "limited selection of start up items". This concern was shared by Andrew Park of GameSpot, who enjoyed the ease of building new community lots in the Downtown area, but found the available objects "limiting", suggesting the game "[expects] the fan community to come up with the variety".

=== Accolades ===
The Academy of Interactive Arts & Sciences nominated Hot Date for its 2001 "Innovation in Computer Gaming" award, which ultimately went to Black & White.

== Legacy ==
Producer Tim LeTorneau retrospectively remarked that Hot Date was a "big transition for the franchise" in "[breaking] the barrier of the house". LeTorneau expressed that the expansion was the starting point for the development of future innovations to the scope of the series, drawing comparisons with the setting of the neighborhood in The Sims 2 and the open-world design of The Sims 3. Hot Date also received retrospective praise, with TheGamer noting the expansion provided players with the "highly underrated" aspects of complex relationships and interests "really gave personality to your Sims". The inclusion of downtown areas was later implemented in The Sims 2: Nightlife.
