= The Sims: Superstar =

- Developer: Maxis (Note: Mac OS X port developed by Westlake Interactive.)
- Publishers: Electronic Arts (PC); Aspyr Media (Mac)
- Platforms: Windows; Mac OS X
- Release: Windows: NA: May 13, 2003; UK: May 23, 2003; Mac OS X: NA: October 22, 2003; EU: November 2003
- Genre: Social simulation
- Modes: Single-player, multiplayer

The Sims: Superstar is a 2003 expansion pack for The Sims developed by Maxis and published by Electronic Arts. The expansion allows Sims to become entertainment figures in a new area, "Studio Town", featuring additional work and leisure items. Upon release, Superstar was a commercial success, leading sales charts and becoming the highest selling computer game in the United States in 2003. Critical reception of the expansion was generally favorable, with critics praising the addition of a new and challenging game mechanic through the star power system, and others critiquing the repetition and tedium of the system in balance with other gameplay mechanics. The addition of celebrity gameplay mechanics in Superstar would be re-introduced in future Sims expansions including The Sims 3: Late Night and The Sims 4: Get Famous.

== Gameplay ==
Superstar introduces objects in Studio Town that allows Sims to pursue careers as an actor, musician, or model.

A new destination called Studio Town, which functions as a workplace for celebrity Sims where regular visits may be required to maintain their fame and career, marking the first time where players can follow their Sims to work. Going to Studio Town freezes the clock for the household. Becoming a Superstar requires near high levels of the Charisma, Creativity, and Body skills. Other personal attributes are also required, as well as maintaining a network of famous friends, and luck in producing good records, films, and runway shows. Sims that have developed their personal attributes enough can easily move between the different categories of superstar, allowing the player to change career as they choose. If a Sim performs exceedingly well, they may be visited at their home by a "fading star" to receive an Oscar-like statue called a "Simmy" for all-around success. They may also receive awards in Studio Town for success in individual categories to bring home and put on display. Non-celebrity Sims are allowed to visit Studio Town for leisure. Celebrities may make cameo appearances in Studio Town but cannot be controlled by the player. The list of celebrities includes Avril Lavigne, Andy Warhol, Marilyn Monroe, Jon Bon Jovi, Christina Aguilera, Freddie Prinze Jr., Sarah McLachlan, Jennifer Lopez and Richie Sambora.

== Reception ==
=== Sales ===
Superstar was a commercial success, being identified by the Entertainment Software Association as the highest-selling computer game in the United States in 2003. Upon release, the game topped NPD monthly sales charts the United States in June 2003, and the ELSPA sales charts for computer games in the United Kingdom in August and September 2003.

=== Reviews ===
Reception

Aggregate score
Aggregator	Score
Metacritic	79/100

Review scores
Publication	Score
Computer Games Magazine	4.5/5
Computer Gaming World	4/5
Eurogamer	5/10
GameSpot	8.0/10
GameSpy	4/5
Hyper	72%
IGN	8.3/10
PC Zone	59%
GMR	4/10

Superstar received "generally favorable" reviews, according to review aggregator Metacritic, with an average score of 79%. Positive reviews praised the expansion's theme and more complex relationship system. IGN praised the expansion as "easily the best in terms of new gameplay", describing the star system as "well integrated in to the overall experience" and "manages to move the entire concept of The Sims forward rather than just tacking on more window dressing". Also describing the expansion as a "worthwhile addition", Computer Gaming World wrote that the celebrity star power system added "a new level of intensity" to the game, and praised the addition of minigames as "entertaining" and executed with "typical Maxis flair." Computer Games similarly noted that the system added "another dimension to the game" and created a "new level of entertainment and challenge". GameSpot also noted the expansion "has the distinction of being the first truly challenging expansion packs for The Sims" due to its star system. GameSpy additionally praised the inclusion of new objects such as baths and massage tables to manage the demands of visits to Studio Town on Sim needs, although found the lack of options to replenish energy a "disappointment as the needs bars seem to fall faster while there than at home."

Negative reviews of Superstar critiqued the superficial and tedious implementation of the game mechanics. PC Zone wrote that the expansion's mechanics were "incredibly repetitive", citing the reliance on the game's "tedious" social interaction and omission of more "daring" and "adult" representations of fame to keep things interesting. GMR similarly noted that "there's too much tedium and repetition involved to inject freshness into a tired franchise", describing the minigames as "unchallenging". Eurogamer similarly cited the repetition of social tasks, on top of the management of Sim needs, as a "frustrating experience", making it "difficult to enjoy the delights that Studio Town offers (if) you're not on top form when you make your entrance." Several critics expressed that Superstar demonstrated a growing fatigue with the number of expansions released for The Sims, with Hyper describing the release as "more of the same" and "exhausting consumers' patience with...a rapidly tiresome concept". Eurogamer wrote that their "patience was wearing thin" following the release of Superstar, finding the game to implement "little to no change to the fundamental Sims formula".

=== Accolades ===
Superstar received the award for "Computer Simulation Game of the Year" during the 7th Annual Interactive Achievement Awards.
