= The Sims: House Party =

- European cover art
- Developer: Maxis (Note: Mac OS X version developed by Westlake Interactive.)
- Publishers: Electronic Arts (PC); Aspyr Media (Mac)
- Platforms: Windows; Mac OS X
- Release: Windows: NA: March 28, 2001; UK: April 6, 2001; Mac OS X: NA: July 30, 2001; EU: October 2001
- Genre: Social simulation
- Modes: Single-player, multiplayer

The Sims: House Party is a 2001 expansion pack for The Sims developed by Maxis and published by Electronic Arts. The expansion introduces the gameplay features and facilities for players to hold parties and gatherings in their Sims' homes. Upon release, House Party met an average reception from reviewers, with praise directed at the new objects and mechanics that aided social interaction and variety of visual styles, and criticism at the limited scope and lack of changes to core gameplay. Many of the objects and gameplay mechanics in House Party would be reintroduced in The Sims 2: Nightlife.

== Gameplay ==
House Party introduces party items, including campfires, allowing multiple Sims to interact at the same time.

House Party introduces the option for players to hold parties. Parties are started by using the phone to throw a party, in which a random group of Sims will visit the lot. Players can also hold parties by inviting a large group of Sims over to the property. The mood of guests will influence the arrival of special Sims, including characters that crash the party, or a mime that lowers the mood of guests at a party where the Sims have a low mood. The expansion introduces several communal objects that allow multiple Sims to socialize at once, including a punch bowl and campfire, as well as entertainment objects including a mechanical bull and dance floor. Other features include services that allow players to purchase pre-prepared meals and catering tables, and hire catering services over the phone. House Party also adds new decor, music tracks, costumes, and floors and wallpapers in the build mode with a country, tiki culture and disco motif.

== Reception ==
Reception

Aggregate score
| Aggregator | Score |
|---|---|
| Metacritic | 74/100 |

Review scores
| Publication | Score |
|---|---|
| Computer Gaming World | 4.5/5 |
| GameRevolution | B− |
| GameSpot | 8.3/10 |
| GameSpy | 77% |
| IGN | 7.0/10 |
| PC Gamer (US) | 73% |
| PC PowerPlay | 80% |
| PC Zone | 50% |
| Games Domain | 6/10 |

=== Sales ===
House Party was a commercial success. In the United States, House Party was the fifth best selling computer software title of 2001, and the seventeenth best selling title of 2002. House Party peaked as the highest selling computer software title of the month in Australia, and the second highest-selling computer software title of the month in the US and UK.

=== Reviews ===
House Party received an average reception, according to review aggregator Metacritic. Critics generally praised the inclusion of the new party gameplay mechanics and objects, with several praising the focus of gameplay additions on the social aspect of gameplay. John Dewhurst of PC PowerPlay highlighted the "entertaining" conceit of the expansion and found it to complement the base game. Computer Gaming World found the new items to be "well-designed" and highly useful for meeting the social needs of Sims. Marc Saltzman of PC Gamer commended the "architectural styles and multitude of objects" for their detail and variety, and noted the addition of new music to the game added more genres of music than the original game.

However, several reviewers critiqued the limited scope of gameplay and content additions in House Party, with some questioning whether it justified commercial release. Many critics noted the expansion did not change the basic structure of the game or add significant gameplay additions. Vincent Lopez of IGN described the expansion as a "filler" that failed to take the gameplay to new places, writing that the concept was "never fully utilized" due to its failure to introduce new locations or spaces for Sims to party. Michael Lafferty of GameZone noted that parties were constrained by the "time and financial management" limitations of the broader gameplay. Several reviewers also observed that the depiction of parties in House Parties was largely sanitised, including the omission of alcohol from the mechanics.
