= List of games ported by Aspyr =

This list includes all developed, ported and published titles by Aspyr Media.

== List of titles ==
| Year | Title | Platform(s) | Notes | Ref. |
|---|---|---|---|---|
| 1997 | Bonkheads | MacOS | | |
| 1997 | Carmageddon | MacOS | | |
| 1998 | Tomb Raider II | MacOS | Ported by Westlake Interactive | |
| 1999 | Bugdom | MacOS | Developed by Pangea Software | |
| 1999 | Madden NFL 2000 | MacOS | | |
| 1999 | Tomb Raider III: Adventures of Lara Croft | MacOS | Ported by Westlake Interactive | |
| 1999 | Tomb Raider: Gold | MacOS | Ported by Westlake Interactive | |
| 2000 | Deus Ex | MacOS | Ported by Westlake Interactive | |
| 2000 | Sid Meier's Alpha Centauri | MacOS | Ported by Westlake Interactive | |
| 2000 | Star Trek: Voyager - Elite Force | MacOS | Ported by Westlake Interactive | |
| 2000 | The Sims | MacOS | Ported by Westlake Interactive | |
| 2000 | Tomb Raider: The Last Revelation | MacOS | Ported by Westlake Interactive | |
| 2001 | American McGee's Alice | MacOS | Ported by Westlake Interactive | |
| 2001 | Escape from Monkey Island | MacOS | Ported by Westlake Interactive | |
| 2001 | iPuppet presents: Colin's Classic Cards | MacOS, Microsoft Windows | Developed by Freeverse | |
| 2001 | Otto Matic | MacOS | Developed by Pangea Software | |
| 2001 | Tomb Raider: Chronicles | MacOS | Ported by Westlake Interactive | |
| 2001 | Tony Hawk's Pro Skater 2 | MacOS | Ported by Westlake Interactive | |
| 2002 | 4x4 Evo 2 | MacOS | | |
| 2002 | Clive Barker's Undying | MacOS | Ported by Westlake Interactive | |
| 2002 | Harry Potter and the Sorcerer's Stone | MacOS | Ported by Westlake Interactive | |
| 2002 | Medal of Honor: Allied Assault | MacOS | Ported by Westlake Interactive | |
| 2002 | Return to Castle Wolfenstein | MacOS | Ported by Westlake Interactive | |
| 2002 | Spider-Man | MacOS | Ported by LTI Gray Matter | |
| 2002 | Star Wars: Galactic Battlegrounds | MacOS | Ported by Westlake Interactive | |
| 2002 | Star Wars: Jedi Knight II - Jedi Outcast | MacOS | Ported by Westlake Interactive | |
| 2002 | Tom Clancy's Ghost Recon | MacOS | Ported by i5works | |
| 2003 | Activision Anthology | Game Boy Advance | | |
| 2003 | BloodRayne | MacOS | | |
| 2003 | Harry Potter and the Chamber of Secrets | MacOS | Ported by Westlake Interactive | |
| 2003 | Kelly Slater's Pro Surfer | MacOS, Microsoft Windows | Ported by Westlake Interactive | |
| 2003 | Law & Order: Dead on the Money | MacOS | Ported by TransGaming | |
| 2003 | NASCAR Racing 2002 Season | MacOS | Ported by Westlake Interactive | |
| 2003 | NASCAR Racing 2003 Season | MacOS | Ported by Westlake Interactive | |
| 2003 | SimCity 4 | MacOS | Ported by i5works | |
| 2003 | Spy Hunter | MacOS | Ported by TransGaming | |
| 2003 | Spy Hunter | Microsoft Windows | Ported by Fluent Entertainment | |
| 2003 | Star Trek: Elite Force II | MacOS | Ported by Westlake Interactive | |
| 2003 | Star Wars: Jedi Knight - Jedi Academy | MacOS | | |
| 2003 | Tiger Woods PGA Tour 2003 | MacOS | | |
| 2003 | Tom Clancy's Rainbow Six 3: Raven Shield | MacOS | Ported by i5works | |
| 2003 | Tomb Raider: The Angel of Darkness | MacOS | Ported by Beenox | |
| 2003 | Tony Hawk's Pro Skater 3 | MacOS | Ported by Beenox | |
| 2003 | Tony Hawk's Pro Skater 4 | MacOS | Ported by Beenox | |
| 2003 | Wakeboarding Unleashed featuring Shaun Murray | Game Boy Advance | Developed by Small Rockets | |
| 2003 | Wakeboarding Unleashed featuring Shaun Murray | MacOS | Ported by Beenox | |
| 2003 | X2: Wolverine's Revenge | MacOS | Ported by i5works | |
| 2003 | Zoo Tycoon | MacOS | Ported by Westlake Interactive | |
| 2004 | 007: Nightfire | MacOS | Ported by TransGaming | |
| 2004 | Battlefield 1942: Deluxe Edition | MacOS | | |
| 2004 | Call of Duty | MacOS | | |
| 2004 | Command & Conquer: Generals | MacOS | Ported by i5works | |
| 2004 | CSI: Crime Scene Investigation | MacOS | | |
| 2004 | Delta Force: Black Hawk Down | MacOS | | |
| 2004 | Homeworld 2 | MacOS | Ported by Beenox | |
| 2004 | Indiana Jones and the Emperor's Tomb | MacOS | Ported by TransGaming | |
| 2004 | MTX Mototrax | MacOS, Microsoft Windows | Ported by Beenox | |
| 2004 | Pitfall: The Lost Expedition | MacOS | Ported by Beenox | |
| 2004 | Shrek 2 | MacOS | | |
| 2004 | Space Colony | MacOS | | |
| 2004 | Spider-Man 2: The Game | MacOS | | |
| 2004 | Star Wars: Knights of the Old Republic | MacOS | | |
| 2004 | The Lord of the Rings: The Return of the King | MacOS | Ported by Beenox | |
| 2004 | Tom Clancy's Splinter Cell | MacOS | Ported by i5works | |
| 2005 | Doom 3 | MacOS | | |
| 2005 | LEGO Star Wars: The Video Game | MacOS | Ported by i5works | |
| 2005 | RollerCoaster Tycoon 3 | MacOS | | |
| 2005 | SpongeBob SquarePants: The Movie | MacOS | | |
| 2005 | Star Wars: Battlefront | MacOS | Ported by Beenox | |
| 2005 | Stubbs the Zombie in Rebel Without a Pulse | MacOS, Microsoft Windows | | |
| 2005 | Stubbs the Zombie in Rebel Without a Pulse | Xbox | Developed by Wideload Games | |
| 2005 | The Guild: Gold Edition | MacOS | | |
| 2005 | The Sims 2 | MacOS | | |
| 2005 | Tiger Woods PGA Tour 2005 | MacOS | | |
| 2005 | True Crime: Streets of LA | MacOS | Ported by Trihedron | |
| 2005 | Wolfenstein: Enemy Territory | MacOS | | |
| 2005 | X²: The Threat | MacOS | Ported by Runecraft | |
| 2006 | 1701 A.D. | Microsoft Windows | Developed by Related Designs Software | |
| 2006 | Bad Day LA | Microsoft Windows | Developed by The Mauretania Import Export Company | |
| 2006 | Call of Duty 2 | MacOS | Ported by i5works | |
| 2006 | Dreamfall: The Longest Journey | Microsoft Windows, Xbox | Developed by Funcom | |
| 2006 | Gothic 3 | Microsoft Windows | Developed by Piranha Bytes | |
| 2006 | ParaWorld | Microsoft Windows | Developed by SEK | |
| 2006 | Quake 4 | MacOS | | |
| 2006 | Sid Meier's Civilization III: Complete | MacOS | | |
| 2006 | Sid Meier's Civilization IV | MacOS | | |
| 2006 | SpellForce 2: Shadow Wars | Microsoft Windows | Developed by Phenomic Development | |
| 2006 | Tony Hawk's American Wasteland | Microsoft Windows | | |
| 2006 | Top Spin 2 | Microsoft Windows | | |
| 2006 | True Crime: New York City | Microsoft Windows | | |
| 2007 | Guitar Hero III: Legends of Rock | MacOS, Microsoft Windows | | |
| 2007 | Made Man: Confessions of the Family Blood | Microsoft Windows, PlayStation 2 | Developed by SilverBack Studios | |
| 2007 | Paws & Claws: Pet Vet | MacOS | | |
| 2007 | Prey | MacOS | | |
| 2007 | Star Wars: Empire at War | MacOS | | |
| 2007 | The Shield: The Game | Microsoft Windows, PlayStation 2 | Developed by Point of View | |
| 2007 | The Sims: Life Stories | MacOS | | |
| 2007 | The Sims: Pet Stories | MacOS | | |
| 2007 | Virtual Villagers: The Lost Children | MacOS | | |
| 2008 | Call of Duty 4: Modern Warfare | MacOS | | |
| 2008 | Emma at the Farm | Nintendo DS | Developed by Neko Entertainment | |
| 2008 | Emma in the Mountains | Nintendo DS | Developed by Nobilis France | |
| 2008 | Enemy Territory: Quake Wars | MacOS | | |
| 2008 | FutureU: The Prep Game for SAT | Nintendo DS | | |
| 2008 | Guitar Hero: Aerosmith | MacOS, Microsoft Windows | | |
| 2008 | Madagascar: Escape 2 Africa | Microsoft Windows | | |
| 2008 | Neverwinter Nights 2 | MacOS | | |
| 2008 | Pony Luv | Nintendo DS | | |
| 2008 | Spider-Man: Web of Shadows | Microsoft Windows | | |
| 2008 | Supreme Commander | Xbox 360 | Developed by Hellbent Games | |
| 2008 | The Sims: Castaway Stories | MacOS | | |
| 2008 | Turok | Microsoft Windows | | |
| 2009 | Call of Duty | PlayStation Network, Xbox Live Arcade | | |
| 2009 | Death to Spies: Moment of Truth | Microsoft Windows | Developed by Haggard Games | |
| 2009 | Defense Grid: The Awakening | Microsoft Windows | Developed by Hidden Path Entertainment | |
| 2009 | Dreamkiller | Microsoft Windows, Xbox 360 | Developed by Mindware Studios | |
| 2009 | Fighting Fantasy: The Warlock of Firetop Mountain | Nintendo DS | Developed by Big Blue Bubble | |
| 2009 | Guitar Hero: World Tour | MacOS, Microsoft Windows | | |
| 2009 | Men of War | Microsoft Windows | Developed by Best Way | |
| 2009 | Touch Mechanic | Nintendo DS | Developed by Kando Games | |
| 2009 | Treasure World | Nintendo DS | | |
| 2010 | Sid Meier's Civilization V | MacOS | | |
| 2010 | Star Wars: The Force Unleashed II | Microsoft Windows | | |
| 2010 | Star Wars: The Force Unleashed - Ultimate Sith Edition | MacOS | | |
| 2011 | Duke Nukem Forever | MacOS | | |
| 2011 | Borderlands 2 | MacOS | | |
| 2011 | Call of Duty: Black Ops | MacOS | | |
| 2012 | Company of Heroes: Anthology | MacOS | | |
| 2012 | Rage | MacOS | | |
| 2012 | Star Wars: Knights of the Old Republic II - The Sith Lords | MacOS | | |
| 2013 | Star Wars: Knights of the Old Republic | iOS | | |
| 2014 | Borderlands 2 | Linux | | |
| 2014 | Borderlands: The Pre-Sequel! | Linux, MacOS | | |
| 2014 | Call of Duty: Modern Warfare 2 | MacOS | | |
| 2014 | Call of Duty: Modern Warfare 3 | MacOS | | |
| 2014 | Geometry Wars 3: Dimensions - Evolved | Linux, MacOS | | |
| 2014 | Sid Meier's Civilization V | Linux | | |
| 2014 | Sid Meier's Civilization: Beyond Earth | Linux, MacOS | | |
| 2014 | Star Wars: Knights of the Old Republic | Android | | |
| 2015 | Fahrenheit: Indigo Prophecy - Remastered | iOS, Linux, MacOS, Microsoft Windows | | |
| 2015 | Homeworld: Remastered Collection | MacOS | | |
| 2015 | Star Wars: Knights of the Old Republic II - The Sith Lords | Linux | | |
| 2016 | Fahrenheit: Indigo Prophecy - Remastered | Android | | |
| 2016 | Jade Empire: Special Edition | Android, iOS | | |
| 2016 | Layers of Fear | Linux, Macintosh, Microsoft Windows, PlayStation 4, Xbox One | Developed by Bloober Team | |
| 2016 | Sid Meier's Civilization VI | MacOS | | |
| 2017 | Borderlands: The Handsome Collection | Linux, Macintosh | | |
| 2017 | Mafia III | MacOS | | |
| 2017 | Observer | Linux, Macintosh, Microsoft Windows, PlayStation 4, Xbox One | Developed by Bloober Team | |
| 2017 | Sid Meier's Civilization VI | iOS, Linux | | |
| 2018 | InnerSpace | Linux, Macintosh, Microsoft Windows, Nintendo Switch, PlayStation 4, Xbox One | Developed by PolyKnight Games | |
| 2018 | Next Up Hero | Macintosh, Microsoft Windows, Nintendo Switch, PlayStation 4, Xbox One | Developed by Digital Continue | |
| 2018 | Sid Meier's Civilization VI | Nintendo Switch | | |
| 2018 | Torn | HTC Vive, Oculus VR, PlayStation VR | Original game Developed by Aspyr | |
| 2019 | Star Wars: Jedi Knight II - Jedi Outcast | Nintendo Switch, PlayStation 4 | | |
| 2019 | Sid Meier's Civilization VI | PlayStation 4, Xbox One | | |
| 2019 | Morkredd | Microsoft Windows, Xbox One, Xbox Series X/S | Developed by Hyper Games | |
| 2020 | Planet Coaster | MacOS | | |
| 2020 | Lightmatter | Microsoft Windows | Developed by Tunnel Vision Games | |
| 2020 | Sid Meier's Civilization VI | Android | | |
| 2020 | Star Wars: Episode I - Racer | Nintendo Switch, PlayStation 4, Xbox One | | |
| 2020 | Star Wars: Jedi Knight - Jedi Academy | Nintendo Switch, PlayStation 4 | | |
| 2021 | RWBY: Grimm Eclipse - Definitive Edition | Nintendo Switch | | |
| 2021 | Stubbs the Zombie in Rebel Without a Pulse | Microsoft Windows, Nintendo Switch, PlayStation 4, Xbox One | | |
| 2021 | Star Wars: Republic Commando | Nintendo Switch, PlayStation 4 | | |
| 2021 | Star Wars: Knights of the Old Republic | Nintendo Switch | | |
| 2022 | Star Wars: The Force Unleashed | Nintendo Switch | | |
| 2022 | Star Wars: Knights of the Old Republic II - The Sith Lords | Nintendo Switch | | |
| 2024 | Tomb Raider I–III Remastered Starring Lara Croft | Microsoft Windows, PlayStation 4, PlayStation 5, Xbox One, Xbox Series X/S, Nintendo Switch, Nintendo Switch 2 | | |
| 2024 | Star Wars: Battlefront Classic Collection | Microsoft Windows, PlayStation 4, PlayStation 5, Xbox One, Xbox Series X/S, Nintendo Switch | | |
| 2024 | Star Wars: Bounty Hunter | Microsoft Windows, PlayStation 4, PlayStation 5, Xbox One, Xbox Series X/S, Nintendo Switch | | |
| 2024 | Legacy of Kain: Soul Reaver 1 & 2 Remastered | Microsoft Windows, PlayStation 4, PlayStation 5, Xbox One, Xbox Series X/S, Nintendo Switch | | |
| 2025 | Star Wars Episode I: Jedi Power Battles | Microsoft Windows, PlayStation 4, PlayStation 5, Xbox One, Xbox Series X/S, Nintendo Switch | | |
| 2025 | Tomb Raider IV–VI Remastered | Microsoft Windows, PlayStation 4, PlayStation 5, Xbox One, Xbox Series X/S, Nintendo Switch | | |
| 2025 | Dungeons & Dragons Neverwinter Nights 2: Enhanced Edition | Microsoft Windows, Playstation 5, Xbox Series X/S, Nintendo Switch | | |
| 2025 | Tomb Raider: Definitive Edition | Nintendo Switch, Nintendo Switch 2 | | |
| 2026 | Deus Ex: Remastered | Microsoft Windows, PlayStation 5, Xbox Series X/S | | |
| 2026 | Rise of the Tomb Raider: 20 Year Celebration | Nintendo Switch 2 | | |
| 2026 | The Lord of the Rings: War in the North - Legacy Edition | Microsoft Windows, Playstation 5, Xbox Series X/S, Nintendo Switch, Nintendo Switch 2 | | |
| 2026 | Middle-earth: Shadow of Mordor | Nintendo Switch 2 | | |
| 2026 | Middle-earth: Shadow of War | Nintendo Switch 2 | | |
| 2026 | Shadow of the Tomb Raider: Definitive Edition | Nintendo Switch 2 | | |
| 2026 | Shrek 2 Remastered | Microsoft Windows, Playstation 5, Xbox Series X/S, Nintendo Switch, Nintendo Switch 2 | | |
