= List of Big Blue Bubble games =

This is a list of video games developed or published (or both) by Big Blue Bubble.

Game	First Edition Year	Developer(s)/Publisher(s)	Platform(s)
Captain Lunar	2004	Synergenix	J2ME/BREW
Geeks	2004	Macrospace	J2ME/BREW
Bubble Trouble	2004	Macrospace	J2ME/BREW
Jarheads of Zarabus	2004	Kayak Interactive	J2ME/BREW
Standing Stones	2004	THQ Wireless	J2ME/BREW
Milton Bradley Board Games	2004	Hands-On Mobile	J2ME/BREW
Destroy All Humans!	2005	THQ Wireless	J2ME/BREW
Jewel Quest	2005	I-Play	J2ME/BREW
The Three Stooges: Makin' Dough	2005	Kayak Interactive	J2ME/BREW
Mastermind	2005	Kayak Interactive	J2ME/BREW
Dragon Tower	2005	THQ	J2ME/BREW
Mahjong Quest	2005	I-Play	J2ME/BREW
Atomic Betty	2005	Namco	GBA
24	2006	I-Play	J2ME/BREW
GoodFellas	2006	I-Play	J2ME/BREW
Jewel Quest II	2006	I-Play	J2ME/BREW
Red Faction II	2006	THQ	J2ME/BREW
Arcade Fishing	2006	GlobalFun	J2ME/BREW
Pat Sajak's Blackjack Bowling	2006	uClick	J2ME/BREW
Atomic Betty 2	2006	Namco	GBA
Mage Knight: Destiny's Soldier	2006	Namco	DS
Popatronic	2007	Oberon Media	PC, Mac, Flash
Geeks Unleashed	2007	Oberon Media	PC, Mac
Elven Chronicles	2007	GlobalFun	J2ME/BREW
Cyber Chess	2007	GlobalFun	J2ME/BREW
Arcade Fishing	2007	GlobalFun	J2ME/BREW
Big Kahuna Reef	2007	I-Play	J2ME/BREW
24: Agent Down	2007	I-Play	J2ME/BREW
Win At Texas Hold'em	2007	I-Play	J2ME/BREW
Robotech	2007	Airborne	J2ME/BREW
Professor Fizzwizzle	2007	Konami	J2ME/BREW
SpongeBob SquarePants	2007	Leapfrog	Leapster
I Spy Fun House	2007	Scholastic/Activision	DS
Animal Genius	2007	Scholastic/Ubisoft	DS
Home Sweet Home	2007	Oberon Media	PC, Mac, Flash
Super Mahjong Quest	2008	I-Play	J2ME/BREW
Theme Park	2008	EA J2ME/BREW	J2ME/BREW
Kenny Vs Spenny	2008	GlobalFun	J2ME/BREW
Megastore Madness	2008	Oberon Media	PC
Home Sweet Home 2: Kitchens	2008	Oberon Media	PC, WiiWare
Zenerchi	2008	Vindigo	J2ME/BREW
Samba De Amigo	2008	SEGA	J2ME/BREW
Home Sweet Home	2008	Nintendo	WiiWare
Hockey AllStar Shootout	2008	Nintendo	WiiWare
Army Men: Soldiers of Misfortune	2008	Zoo Games	Wii, DS, PS2,
Home Sweet Home: Christmas Ed.	2008	Big Blue Bubble	PC
Legacy	2008	Oberon Media	PC, Mac, Flash
Masters of Mystery	2008	Big Fish Games	PC, Mac, Flash
Jungle Book	2009	Gamelife	Wii, PC, DS
iCarly: iDream In Toons	2009	Nickelodeon	PC
Animal Planet: Vet Life	2009	Activision	DS, Wii
Masters of Mystery 2	2009	Big Fish Games	PC
Hockey Allstar Shootout	2009	Big Blue Bubble	iOS
Elven Wars	2009	Big Blue Bubble	WiiWare, iOS
Home Sweet Home	2009	Aspyr Media	DS, Wii
Animal Planet: Emergency Vets	2009	Activision	DS, Wii
iCarly	2009	MTV	PC
Pop-A-Tronic	2009	Big Blue Bubble	iOS
Fighting Fantasy	2009	Aspyr Media	DS
Elven Chronicles	2009	Big Blue Bubble	iOS
Home Sweet Home	2009	Big Blue Bubble	iOS
Pub Darts	2009	Nintendo	WiiWare
Garters & Ghouls	2009	NAMCO	iOS
Fighting Fantasy: The Warlock Atop Fire Mountain	2010	Big Blue Bubble	iOS
Tinseltown Dreams	2010	NAMCO	iOS
Avatar: The Last Airbender	2010	Nickelodeon	PC
Fighting Fantasy: Deathtrap Dungeon	2010	Big Blue Bubble	iOS
Thumpies	2010	Big Blue Bubble	iOS, PC
I Spy Universe	2010	Scholastic	DS
Home Sweet Home Online	2010	Big Blue Bubble	Facebook
Thumpies XL	2010	Big Blue Bubble	iPad
Fighting Fantasy: Citadel of Chaos	2010	Big Blue Bubble	iOS
Fighting Fantasy: Creature of Havoc	2010	Big Blue Bubble	iOS
Digging for Dinosaurs	2010	Big Blue Bubble	DS
iCarly 2: iJoin the Click!	2010	Big Blue Bubble	DS, DSi, Wii
City of Thieves	2010	Big Blue Bubble	iOS
Aaah! Chompsters!	2010	Big Blue Bubble	iOS
Snow Ballistic	2010	Big Blue Bubble	iOS
RoosterPunch	2010	Big Blue Bubble	iOS
Home Sweet Home 2: Kitchens	2010	Big Blue Bubble	iOS
Invaders From Uranus	2010	Big Blue Bubble	iOS
Vintage Hockey	2010	Big Blue Bubble	iOS
Burn the Rope	2010	Big Blue Bubble	iOS, Android, WiiWare, PlayStation Vita, Symbian, Xbox LIVE
Vintage Hockey HD	2010	Big Blue Bubble	iPad
Home Sweet Home HD	2011	Big Blue Bubble	iPad
Burn the Rope HD	2011	Big Blue Bubble	iPad
Animal Pop	2011	Big Blue Bubble	iOS
Retro Pinball	2011	Digital Extremes / Fuse	iOS
LEGO Ninjago: Scavenger Hunt	2011	The LEGO Group	iOS
Muse	2011	Big Fish Games	PC
Act of War	2011	Atari	iOS
Thumpies	2011	Big Blue Bubble	Mac
Crash Canyon Adventure	2011	Breakthrough New Media	Facebook
Paper Munchers	2011	Big Blue Bubble	iOS
Burn the Rope Worlds	2011	Big Blue Bubble	iOS, Android
Fling a Thing	2011	Big Blue Bubble	iOS, Android, Flash
Kung Fu Panda World	2011	DreamWorks	iOS
Magic School Bus: Oceans	2011	Scholastic	DS
Hamster Cannon	2011	Big Blue Bubble	iOS, Android
Dark Incursion 3D	2011	Big Blue Bubble	iOS, Android
Fling a Thing HD	2011	Big Blue Bubble	iPad
I, Oracle	2012	Big Blue Bubble	iOS, Android
Zoo Defenders	2012	6 Waves	iOS, Android
My Singing Monsters	2012	Big Blue Bubble	iOS, Android, PlayStation Vita, Kindle Fire tablet, Barnes & Noble Nook, Big Fish Games, Steam
Masters of Mystery	2012	G5	iOS, Android
Jewel Quest 4	2012	iWin	iOS
Raft Pirates	2012	6 Waves	iOS, Android
LEGO Ninjago: Rise of the Snakes	2012	The LEGO Group	iOS
Old School Defense	2012	Big Blue Bubble	iOS, Android
Pin Something	2012	Big Blue Bubble	iOS
Duff's Zombie Cupcakes	2013	Big Blue Bubble	iOS, Android
Buster Bash Pro	2013	Big Blue Bubble	iOS, Android
Greatfruit Grove	2013	Big Blue Bubble	iOS
My Muppets Show	2013	Disney	iOS, Android
Burn the Rope 3D	2013	Big Blue Bubble	iOS
Finder's Keep	2014	Big Blue Bubble	iOS, Android
My Mammott	2014	Big Blue Bubble	iOS, Android
My PomPom	2014	Big Blue Bubble	iOS, Android
Furcorn's Jelly Dreams	2015	Big Blue Bubble	iOS
My Singing Monsters: Dawn of Fire	2015	Big Blue Bubble	iOS, Android, Kindle Fire tablet, Barnes & Noble Nook
Jammer Splash!	2016	Big Blue Bubble	iOS, Android
Pixel Dodgers	2016	Big Blue Bubble	iOS, Android
My Singing Monsters: Coloring Book	2016	Big Blue Bubble	iOS, Android
My Singing Monsters: Official Guide	2017	Big Blue Bubble	iOS, Android
Home Arcade	2017	Big Blue Bubble	iOS, Android
Short Fused	2017	Big Blue Bubble	iOS, Android
Zombie Bloxx	2017	Big Blue Bubble	iOS, Android, Steam
Jungle Guardians	2017	Big Blue Bubble	iOS, Android
Wrecking Squad	2018	Big Blue Bubble	iOS, Android
Concert Kings	2018	Big Blue Bubble	iOS, Android
Teaching Guide Grade 1-3: My Singing Monsters	2018	Big Blue Bubble	iOS
Chaos Reborn: Adventures	2018	Big Blue Bubble	iOS, Android
Super Dinosaur: Kickin' Tail	2018	Big Blue Bubble	iOS, Android
Foregone	2020	Big Blue Bubble	PC, Nintendo Switch, PlayStation 4, Xbox One, iOS
My Singing Monsters: Playground	2021	Big Blue Bubble	PC, Nintendo Switch, PlayStation 4, PlayStation 5, Xbox One, Xbox Series X
Power Chord	2023	Big Blue Bubble	PC, Nintendo Switch
My Singing Monsters Thumpies	2024	Big Blue Bubble	iOS, Android
My Singing Monsters Karaoke	2026	Big Blue Bubble	PC
