= The Sims Castaway =

The Sims Castaway may refer to:

- The Sims 2: Castaway
- The Sims Castaway Stories
