= Bloober Team =

Polish video game developer

Bloober Team S.A.
- Type: Public
- Traded as: WSE: BLO
- ISIN: PLBLOBR00014
- Industry: Video games
- Founded: 6 November 2008; 17 years ago
- Founders: Piotr Babieno; Piotr Bielatowicz
- Headquarters: Kraków, Poland
- Key people: Piotr Babieno (CEO)
- Products: See developed games
- Owners: Tencent (20%); Piotr Babieno (14%)
- Number of employees: 250
- Subsidiaries: Digital Games Services; iPlacement; Neuro-Code; Feardemic; Bloober Team NA; Broken Mirror Games
- Website: www.blooberteam.com

Bloober Team S.A. is a Polish video game developer based in Kraków. Founded in November 2008 by Piotr Babieno and Piotr Bielatowicz, the company is best known for developing horror games such as Layers of Fear (2016), Observer (2017), Blair Witch (2019), The Medium (2021), Silent Hill 2 (2024), and Cronos: The New Dawn (2025). In January 2018, Bloober Team received the Paszport Polityki award in the "Digital Culture" category. It owns third-party publisher Feardemic. Since January 2024 Bloober Team has been listed on the main market of Warsaw Stock Exchange.

== History ==
Bloober Team was founded by Piotr Babieno and Piotr Bielatowicz. The studio was originally part of Nibris, a developer set up in 2006, but sought to become independent through investor funding. The studio formally launched on 6 November 2008, employing 20 people in Kraków offices. Babieno became the chief executive officer for the company. In October 2010, following Nibris' decision to exit the game development business and the cancellation of their only video game, Sadness, many of the company's developers joined Bloober Team.

One of its first titles it developed was Music Master: Chopin for Microsoft Windows and iOS. Because it was released to celebrate the 200th anniversary of the birth of Frédéric Chopin, the game contains several piano and vocal performances of Chopin's work. In 2013, it released a free-to-play multiplayer online battle arena game Deathmatch Village for the PlayStation 3 and PlayStation Vita. It features cross-play interactivity between the two consoles and consists of three-on-three arena battles.

One of the turning points in Bloober Team's history was the development of Basement Crawl, which debuted alongside the PlayStation 4. Following poor reception, the studio reworked the game by re-using the core game concept while introducing new graphics, game mechanics, story, and game modes. The resulting product, Brawl, was released in February 2015 to favourable reviews and was made available free of charge for owners of Basement Crawl.

The developer received the Paszport Polityki award in the "Digital Culture" category on 10 January 2018. A new project, codenamed Project Méliès, was announced on 8 March 2018. In October that year, the title was announced to be Layers of Fear 2, to be released in 2019 by Gun Media.

In 2009, Bloober Team founded a subsidiary limited liability company iFun4all sp. z o.o. and later brought it to NewConnect stock exchange with the initial public offering occurring on 23 September 2016. On 23 August 2019, the company changed its name from iFun4all to Draw Distance. Bloober Team remains the owner of 34.98% of the Draw Distance shares.

After about a year of negotiations with various companies related to the acquisition, Bloober Team stated in March 2021 that it plans to remain as an independent company, though will look to do strategic partnering with one of these companies in the future.

Bloober Team and Konami announced a strategic partnership in June 2021 to jointly share technology and game development towards video game titles.

In October 2021, Bloober Team announced that Tencent became its majority shareholder with 22% of shares. In May 2022, Bloober Team announced a "significant license and distribution agreement" with Sony Interactive Entertainment.

During Summer Game Fest 2022, Bloober Team confirmed it was working on a new Layers of Fear, described as both a remaster and sequel of the original series, built using Unreal Engine 5.

In October 2022, after months of rumors, Konami announced that Bloober Team was remaking Silent Hill 2. The studio used Unreal Engine 5 and was a timed console-exclusive for PlayStation 5, while also releasing for Windows through Steam. In an interview with DreadXP, Bloober Team revealed that it was invited by Konami to pitch its idea for a Silent Hill 2 remake among other studios.

In February 2023, Bloober Team revealed that a title codenamed "Project M" would be entering development, with Draw Distance as the main developer. In July 2024, it was announced that Draw Distance would be removed from the project in favor of Bloober Team completing it in-house. In October 2025, it was revealed to be targeting Nintendo platforms exclusively. In September 2026, it was officially revealed as Onyx: The Dark Grip, scheduled for release on Nintendo Switch 2 in 2027.

Bloober Team announced two new projects in April 2024. The first, "Project R", in partnership with Skybound Entertainment, was revealed in March 2025 as I Hate This Place, developed by Rock Square Thunder and Bloober Team's newly-established subsidiary Broken Mirror Games. The second, "Project C", was announced in partnership with Take-Two Interactive's publishing label Private Division. A month later, Private Division canceled the publishing deal, though Bloober Team stated they were "prepared for potential alternatives". In October 2024, "Project C" was re-announced as the self-published survival horror game Cronos: The New Dawn, which was released in September 2025.

In February 2025, Bloober Team announced that it is working with Konami on another game following the success of the Silent Hill 2 remake. In June 2025, it was announced that this game was a remake of the original Silent Hill.

In June 2026, Bloober Team announced the psychological thriller game Star Trek: Shadow Frontier, set to be published by Paramount Games Studio in 2027.

== Games developed ==
Year	Title	Platform(s)	Publisher(s)	Ref.
2010	History: Egypt – Engineering an Empire	iOS, Nintendo DS, PlayStation Portable, Wii, Windows	Bloober Team	
2010	Hospital Havoc	Nintendo DS	Bloober Team	
2010	Music Master: Chopin	iOS, macOS, Windows	Bloober Team	
2010	Paper Wars: Cannon Fodder	Nintendo DS, PlayStation Portable, Wii, Xbox 360, Nintendo Switch	Bloober Team	
2011	Double Bloob	Nintendo DSi	Bloober Team	
2012	A-Men	PlayStation 3, PlayStation Vita, Windows	Bloober Team	
2013	Deathmatch Village	PlayStation 3, PlayStation Vita	Bloober Team	
2013	A-Men 2	PlayStation 3, PlayStation Vita, Windows	Bloober Team	
2014	Basement Crawl	PlayStation 4	Bloober Team	
2015	Brawl	Android, Linux, macOS, Nintendo Switch, PlayStation 4, Windows	Bloober Team	
2016	Layers of Fear	Linux, macOS, Nintendo Switch, PlayStation 4, Windows, Xbox One	Aspyr	
2017	Observer	Linux, macOS, Nintendo Switch, PlayStation 4, PlayStation 5, Windows, Xbox One, Xbox Series X/S	Aspyr	
2019	Layers of Fear 2	Nintendo Switch, PlayStation 4, Windows, Xbox One	Gun Media	
2019	Blair Witch	Nintendo Switch, PlayStation 4, Windows, Xbox One	Bloober Team	
2021	The Medium	macOS, Nintendo Switch, PlayStation 5, Windows, Xbox Series X/S	Bloober Team	
2023	Layers of Fear	macOS, PlayStation 5, Windows, Xbox Series X/S, Nintendo Switch 2	Bloober Team	
2024	Silent Hill 2	PlayStation 5, Windows, Xbox Series X/S	Konami Digital Entertainment	
2025	Cronos: The New Dawn	Linux, macOS, Nintendo Switch 2, PlayStation 5, Windows, Xbox Series X/S	Bloober Team	
2027	Star Trek: Shadow Frontier	Nintendo Switch 2, PlayStation 5, Windows, Xbox Series X/S	Paramount Games Studio	
2027	Onyx: The Dark Grip	Nintendo Switch 2	Bloober Team	
TBA	Silent Hill	TBA	Konami Digital Entertainment	
TBA	Layers of Fear 3	TBA	Bloober Team	

== Broken Mirror Games ==
Broken Mirror Games is a co-development studio established as a subsidiary of Bloober Team in 2024.

=== Games developed ===
Year	Title	Platform(s)	Co-developer(s)	Publisher(s)	Ref.
2025	Star Trek: Infection	Meta Quest 3, Windows	Played with Fire	Played with Fire	
2026	I Hate This Place	Nintendo Switch, PlayStation 5, Windows, Xbox Series X/S	Rock Square Thunder	Feardemic	
2026	Saw: Genesis	Windows	Anshar Studios	Bloober Team	
