= Fighting Fantasy: The Warlock of Firetop Mountain =

2009 video game

- Developer: Big Blue Bubble
- Publishers: Aspyr (DS); Big Blue Bubble (iOS)
- Producer: Jason Willis
- Designer: Goran Marinic
- Programmers: Bruno Mateus; Nicole Holland
- Artists: Mark Maia; Randy Van Der Vlag; Darren Truong
- Composer: Tomislav Slogar
- Series: Fighting Fantasy
- Platforms: Nintendo DS, iOS
- Release: DS: NA: November 25, 2009; iOS; January 3, 2010
- Genre: Action role-playing
- Mode: Single-player

Fighting Fantasy: The Warlock of Firetop Mountain is a first person action RPG developed by Big Blue Bubble for Nintendo DS on November 25, 2009, and for iOS on January 3, 2010. The game is loosely based on the roleplaying gamebook of the same name.

== Gameplay ==
As a first-person camera game, the player controls the character (an adventurer) in a combination of combat and puzzle game elements. The player typically has to navigate the character through a long series of tests, trials and mazes to reach goals. The end goal is to reach the evil warlock in his mountain fortress.

The character can roam freely through the environment, and uses a combination of skills, weapons, armour and magic. All are required to a degree to successfully complete the game.

== Plot ==
The ancient Dwarven Keep at Firetop Mountain has been held by the sinister Warlock Zagor for decades. Many have tried to plunder the fabled riches hidden deep within the mountain, and none have returned. Only the evil scourge of the Warlock and his minions stand in the way of your prize.

The player takes the role of an adventurer on a quest to find the treasure of a powerful warlock, hidden deep within Firetop Mountain. The player must navigate the dungeons beneath Firetop Mountain, battle monsters and attempt to locate certain items necessary to completing the quest.

== Reception ==
Reception

Aggregate score
Aggregator	Score
Metacritic	(iOS) 78/100 (DS) 45/100

Review scores
Publication	Score
1Up.com	(DS) D−
Destructoid	(DS) 4/10
GameSpot	(DS) 3.5/10
IGN	(DS) 5.5/10
NGamer	(DS) 41%
Nintendo Power	(DS) 4/10
Pocket Gamer	(iOS) 3.5/5
RPGamer	(DS) 2/5

The iOS version received "generally favorable reviews", while the DS version received "generally unfavorable reviews", according to the review aggregation website Metacritic.
