= Cronos: The New Dawn =

2025 survival horror game

- Developer: Bloober Team
- Publisher: Bloober Team
- Directors: Wojciech Piejko; Jacek Zięba
- Producers: Kacper Michalski; Jacek Zięba
- Designer: Wojciech Piejko
- Programmers: Mariusz Szaflik; Jan Ambroziak
- Artists: Grzegorz Siemczuk; Iwo Widuliński
- Writers: Grzegorz Like; Dawid Barański
- Composer: Arkadiusz Reikowski
- Engine: Unreal Engine 5
- Platforms: Linux; Nintendo Switch 2; PlayStation 5; Windows; Xbox Series X/S; MAC OS
- Release: 5 September 2025
- Genre: Survival horror
- Mode: Single-player

Cronos: The New Dawn is a 2025 survival horror video game developed and published by Bloober Team. The game was released for Linux, Nintendo Switch 2, PlayStation 5, Windows, and Xbox Series X/S on 5 September 2025, to generally positive reviews from critics. By 26 November 2025, it had sold 500,000 units.

== Gameplay ==
Cronos: The New Dawn is a survival horror game played from a third-person perspective. The player character, the Traveler, can use both melee abilities and a variety of firearms such as pistols and shotguns to defeat enemies. If defeated enemies are not properly disposed by using fire, a surviving enemy can merge with the undead corpses, absorbing their abilities and becoming more powerful in the process.

== Plot ==
=== Premise ===
Cronos: The New Dawn follows the Traveler, who works as an agent for an enigmatic organization known as the Collective to serve in a mission known as the Vocation. The Traveler must survive the dangers of a post-apocalyptic wasteland to find points that allow them to travel back in time to Poland in the 1980s in order to extract selected people who did not survive the Change, a cataclysmic event that turned humans into monsters known as "Orphans".

=== Synopsis ===
Traveler ND-3576 is awakened from hibernation to continue the Collective's work of saving humans from the Change. She takes on a mission to extract an individual named Edward Wiśniewski, using a Dive to travel back in time to when Edward was still alive to extract his Essence so it can be uploaded to the Collective through "Ascendance". During the Ascendance process, Edward's consciousness communicates with the Traveler and says he is convinced the Change was caused by government experimentation. The Ascendance Terminal suddenly malfunctions, but the Traveler is saved from death by the Warden, another Traveler whose role is to oversee the work of the Collective. While the Warden works to repair the Terminal, the Traveler is assigned a mission to collect the Essence of Artur Baryka, a friend of Edward's.

The Traveler heads to the Steelworks to initiate another Dive and encounters Dr. Weronika Kamiński, who arrived to the Steelworks with Artur to search for his brother, Gabriel. Weronika flees, and the Traveler corners Artur in the foreman's office with an infected Gabriel, who is undergoing a mutation into an Orphan. Artur blames the Traveler and her kind for bringing the Change from the future, and says that Gabriel had met a Traveler before. The Traveler then has a choice to collect either Artur or Gabriel's Essence.

In the Terminal, the Traveler converses with their chosen target as they explain that a Traveler was captured by the military and the Change occurred shortly after their arrival. The Traveler sets Dr. Dawid Zybert, the man in charge of examining this other Traveler, to be her next target and heads to the hospital. Diving to the past, the Traveler encounters Weronika again and discovers that Zybert has already transformed into an Orphan. She extracts Zybert's Essence to learn what remains of his mind while Weronika reveals the other Traveler, the "Pathfinder", was originally supposed to extract her Essence but decided not to.

The Traveler begins experiencing hallucinations and pain from containing the Essences inside her for too long. She talks with Zybert's Essence, who reveals that he hid the Pathfinder away in a remote abbey overseen by his daughter Eliza to protect him, and that he believes the Change was always lying dormant within the earth. The Warden explains a Pathfinder is a special type of Traveler designed to open the Rifts they use for time travel, which means his knowledge could allow them to fully repair the Terminal and remove the Essences. The Traveler heads to the abbey and defeats Eliza, who has become an Orphan, but finds the Pathfinder already dead. Accessing his memories, the Pathfinder's last message states he had lost faith in the Collective and Vocation and had done his best to sabotage their efforts to extract Weronika's Essence. Noticing the Pathfinder and the Warden share the same designation number, the Traveler carries the Pathfinder's corpse back to the Terminal where she is shocked to find Weronika's corpse.

It is revealed that the Traveler herself is the result of an experiment by the Pathfinder to transfer Weronika's Essence into a Traveler's body, having grown close to her during his time in the past. The Warden is actually the Pathfinder, who transferred his consciousness into a different body to stay hidden from the Collective. Furious that the Traveler hasn't developed into a perfect copy of Weronika as he had hoped, the Pathfinder returns to his original body and travels back in time to repeat his experiment from the beginning. The Traveler follows and battles the Pathfinder, ultimately defeating him. Weronika appears, having been brought there by the Pathfinder, stating she wants to help him find a way to save humanity. The Traveler insists he cannot be allowed to live so that Weronika doesn't suffer the fate she did. The game then has multiple endings depending on the player's choice.

If the Traveler spares the Pathfinder, both he and Weronika travel to the future, leaving the Traveler behind. However, his memory is damaged in the crossing and Weronika starts to mutate into an Orphan, forcing the Pathfinder to extract her Essence and start his experiment all over again.

If the Traveler kills the Pathfinder, she uses the Pathfinder's tech to open a new Rift for Weronika to enter before dying. Weronika enters the Rift and is sent back to shortly before the Change occurs. She arrives at Edward's apartment seeking help, where it's revealed that she is carrying the Change infection.

If completed on New Game+, the Traveler realizes that they have experienced the game's events before and that the cycle will continue infinitely. Weronika's Essence will always be extracted into a Traveler's body, leading to the confrontation with the Pathfinder, only for the past Weronika to become infected, have her Essence extracted, and start the loop again. The Pathfinder accepts this as his fault and sends Weronika into the Rift with the Traveler to break the cycle. Some time later, a Traveler pod opens as the Traveler's hand reaches in to welcome an unseen person as "Weronika".

== Development ==
Cronos: The New Dawn was developed by Bloober Team. Development of the game began in late 2021, with the team working on The Medium being assigned to work on Cronos. Bloober Team chose to make a science fiction horror game because they were also working on a remake of Silent Hill 2, which featured more grounded themes. The game features a retrofuturistic setting, with the team comparing it to Alien and the older Star Wars films. "New Dawn" is the starting gameplay area in Cronos, and its design was inspired by Kraków during the communist rule in the 1980s. The setting was based on brutalist architecture. The team was inspired by a number of films and television series, such as 12 Monkeys, Dark, and Annihilation. Body horror inspired the game's enemy design, and The Thing was cited by the team as a source of inspiration. The team considered Cronos as a narrative-driven game, one that tells "an intimate story about people and characters". The game is developed using Unreal Engine 5.

Following the release of The Medium, the studio wanted to pursue a larger project and move on from making adventure games to something more gameplay-focused. In 2023, Bloober Team's co-founder, Piotr Babieno, announced that the studio will stop making psychological horror games and transition to making "mass-market horror" games. Gameplay wise, the game was inspired by Dead Space and Alan Wake, both of which feature unique combat mechanics which encourage players to be strategic while fighting against enemies. Co-director Jacek Zięba added that, in terms of gameplay, the game was "more Resident Evil and less Silent Hill".

== Release ==
Private Division was originally set to publish Cronos: The New Dawn, though it dropped out of the deal in May 2024. In October 2024, the game was officially announced by Bloober Team, which will self-publish the game for PlayStation 5, Windows, and Xbox Series X/S in 2025. In June 2025, it was announced that Skybound Games would distribute the PlayStation 5 physical edition in North and South America. In Europe, the Middle East, and Australia PlayStation 5 and Windows physical editions will be distributed by Bandai Namco Europe Entertainment S.A.S. The game's release date was announced alongside a Nintendo Switch 2 version of the game during the July 2025 Nintendo Direct Partner Showcase presentation, with the Switch 2 version set for release alongside the other platforms.

Cronos: The New Dawn was released for Linux, Nintendo Switch 2, PlayStation 5, Windows, and Xbox Series X/S on 5 September 2025. A downloadable content pack titled Lazarus, which follows the Warden and serves as a prequel to the main game, is set to be released on 3 December 2026.

== Reception ==
Reception

Aggregate scores
Aggregator	Score
Metacritic	(NS2) 75/100 (PC) 76/100 (PS5) 77/100 (XSXS) 80/100
OpenCritic	77% recommend

Review scores
Publication	Score
Destructoid	7/10
Eurogamer	4/5
Famitsu	8/10, 9/10, 7/10, 8/10 (Note: Each of the four reviewers in Famitsu scored the game on a ten-point scale.)
Game Informer	7.75/10
GameSpot	8/10
GamesRadar+	3.5/5
Hardcore Gamer	4/5
IGN	7/10
PC Gamer (US)	58/100
Push Square	8/10
Shacknews	9/10
The Guardian	2/5
Video Games Chronicle	3/5

Cronos: The New Dawn received "generally favorable" reviews from critics, according to review aggregator website Metacritic.

=== Sales ===
Within the first three days of its release, Cronos: The New Dawn sold over 200,000 digital units, according to estimates published by Alinea Analytics. On 30 September 2025, Bloober Team announced that the game had sold 200,000 units by 8 September. On 26 November, Bloober Team announced that the game had sold 500,000 units. 9 months after release, in June 2026, the game managed to break even on its development costs.

=== Awards ===
The game was nominated for Best Audio Design at the Golden Joystick Awards 2025.
