= Dreamkiller (video game) =

2009 video game

- Developer: Mindware Studios
- Publisher: Aspyr
- Composer: Ján Dušek
- Platform: Microsoft Windows
- Release: NA: October 12, 2009; EU: October 12, 2009
- Genre: First-person shooter
- Modes: Single-player, multiplayer

Dreamkiller is a dark fantasy first-person shooter where the player takes on the role of Alice Drake, a psychologist with the ability to enter the minds of her patients to fight the monsters appearing in their dreams. The game is developed by Mindware Studios and published by Aspyr for Microsoft Windows.

== Gameplay ==
The gameplay is heavily based on Painkiller. The player progresses through various levels, battling hordes of monsters. There are different weapons for the player to use, from a fire spell to a minigun. The action takes place in dreams, so locations are all based on a person's personal phobia: a zoo infested with spiders, an arctic area full of sunken ships, a factory-like place filled with living machinery, a hospital, a twisted forest, and more. Each level is preceded by a comic-like cutscene, and is usually culminated with a battle against a boss, which is an enforced version of an enemy previously encountered. The game has its own achievement system.

== Plot ==
Alice Drake is a very special psychologist, who enters her patients' dreams and battles their fears, which take forms of insane monsters. As the game progresses, she is confused by the fact that the number of her patients suddenly increases, and their fears becomes more and more insane, usually manifesting and creating phobia suddenly, without a proper medical history. As she clears the minds of her patients, she learns of an evil entity, the Dream Devourer, that feeds on human dreams, corrupting them and bringing insanity. Eventually, she is forced to battle in her own mind, where she finds a way to locate the entity. In order to put an end to insanity it brought to the real world, she enters the Dream Devourer's domain and slays it.

== Reception ==
Reception

Aggregate score
Aggregator	Score
Metacritic	47/100

Review scores
Publication	Score
GameSpot	5/10
IGN	4.2/10

Dreamkiller received an aggregated rating of 47 on Metacritic, indicating a "generally unfavorable" response with the highest rating being 70/100.

GameSpot gave the game a 5/10, praising its level and enemy design but criticizing the gameplay for not being engaging. IGN gave the game a lower score of 4.2/10, criticizing it for being "tedious and repetitive".
