= Layers of Fear 2 =

2019 video game

- Developer: Bloober Team
- Publisher: Gun Media
- Designers: Michał Król; Paweł Niezabitowski
- Programmers: Eryk Dykiel; Mariusz Szaflik
- Writer: Andrzej Mądrzak
- Composer: Arkadiusz Reikowski
- Engine: Unreal Engine 4
- Platforms: Microsoft Windows; PlayStation 4; Xbox One; Nintendo Switch
- Release: Windows, PS4, Xbox One; 28 May 2019; Nintendo Switch; 20 May 2021
- Genre: Psychological horror
- Mode: Single-player

Layers of Fear 2 is a psychological horror video game developed by Bloober Team. It was released for Linux, Microsoft Windows, PlayStation 4, and Xbox One in 2019, and for the Nintendo Switch in 2021. It is a sequel to Layers of Fear.

In Layers of Fear 2, the player controls an actor on board a ship following instructions of an unseen director. The gameplay, presented in first-person perspective, is story-driven and revolves around puzzle-solving and exploration. A sequel titled Layers of Fear was released on 15 June 2023.

== Gameplay ==
The player takes control of an actor aboard a ship. As the player explores the ship, he comes across reels of film and camera equipment, as well as various built sets. The voice of the film's director appears to be piped in at certain points, when the actor is expected to complete a certain task. Whether or not the player complies with the director's instructions influences the dialogue and ending of the game.

== Plot ==
The game begins with an actor awakening and walking through a damaged, dilapidated area resembling the hallways of a cruise ship, encountering a deformed female figure who mocks them, stating that they "almost had it". The game takes place on a cruise ship after the actor boards it in a special suite, as their agent convinced them to meet with a mysterious, eccentric director. They are contacted by the director by a speaker, and is tasked with "building the character"; the actor must traverse an area of the ship sectioned off from the guests and crew. Throughout the many corridors and rooms of the ship, they encounter many strange occurrences and seemingly supernatural happenings as the director speaks to them, with them having various flashbacks, with the various visions and hallucinations changing to match. The actor obtains different film reels that lead across four main acts, with each having puzzles, obstacles and important decisions that the player must make.

The story that is unfurled begins with a young brother, James Burns, and his older sister Lily. Both are left alone with their abusive, alcoholic father, who was left without an eye after his time in military service. He resents James, due to his wife dying after he is born, and frequently abuses him. Lily tries to lift his spirits by often playing pretend, inspired by a pirate film they secretly watch in their father's movie theater. One time, Lily falls and hit her head, and after momentarily having passed out and wake up, Lily says that the old her is dead, calling herself "Captain".

Both siblings run away after the movie theater burns down, killing their father (it is possibly implied that Lily was responsible for it herself somehow). They later find and board onto a ship as stowaways, though they must hide from the crew members and search for food. After James almost gets them caught one time, Lily goes out to search alone. James, scared of being alone, is reminded that if he stops and listens, he can hear his sister speaking from within him. Later Lily returns, but is visibly angered and distressed; it is implied by various voices and visualizations that she was sexually assaulted by a passenger, who she then proceeded to kill. Lily, unable to handle her trauma, lashes out at James. Shortly thereafter, a fire breaks out during a storm, and James and Lily are separated, with Lily promising that she will find him. However, James lives as he escapes on a boat, while Lily dies on the ship. Years later, James is later discovered by an actor, who introduces him into the profession, leading to the events of the game. The game ends with the actor arriving at a stage with a small boy, where they end a performance in front of a crowd. The actor then looks at themself in their room, with the actor revealed to be male or female, depending on the player's choices. The screen cuts to black after they turn to see a chest trembling and bursting open.

The game takes place within James' mind, who was left empty and vacant by Lily's death; the director is hinted to be his inner conscience. James is caught in an inner struggle, as he attempts to reconstruct the consciousness of his deceased sister to bring her back. His unconscious, taking the form of the director, drives him to prevent this, instead rejecting his alter-ego's attempts to overtake him. James continuously flees from a deformed, shapeless monster that represents his indecision and lack of identity. The deformed woman, known as the "Rat Queen", is a mysterious entity that appears to be guiding James; in the third ending where the decisions are made in equal measure, she appears and reprimands James, and the cycle starts again as the events of the game reset. In the fifth and final act, James traverses the center of his mind within the degraded, submerged recreation of the ship, with him emerging as "Lily" or himself, with the director parting ways with him (for a time, if the third ending takes place).

There is hinted to be a supernatural element to this, as Lily's voice tells him that he called out for her soul, but "something else answered", possibly referring to the Rat Queen, who might be a being aiding in finalizing his choice of who he is; this is also why some people don't completely recognize him, and no camera or writings can ascertain his appearance or his name. As for the final scene, for "Lily" it symbolizes her taking over Jacob as his sense of self is dissolved, though James' underlying knowledge will forever follow him; for the true James, it represents his acceptance and living with of his past trauma, guilt and regrets and moving on with his life, building his own personal character rather than living off another person's.

== Reception ==
Reception

Aggregate score
Aggregator	Score
Metacritic	PC: 70/100; PS4: 68/100; XONE: 63/100; NS: 72/100

Review scores
Publication	Score
Adventure Gamers	2/5
Destructoid	6.5/10
Hardcore Gamer	4.5/5
IGN	9/10
Slant	3.5/5

Layers of Fear 2's received "mixed or average reviews". Steve Petite with IGN called it "the most stunning horror game of this generation" and lauded its "hauntingly beautiful writing."
