= A-Men 2 =

2015 video game

- Developer: Bloober Team
- Publisher: Bloober Team
- Platforms: Windows, PlayStation 3, PlayStation Vita
- Release: Windows: WW: 24 June 2015; PS3, PS Vita: WW: 5 November 2015
- Genre: Puzzle-platform
- Mode: Single-player

A-Men 2 is puzzle-platform game released on 24 June 2015 for Microsoft Windows, and on 5 November 2015 for PlayStation 3 and PlayStation Vita. It is a sequel to A-Men from 2012.

== Reception ==
Review aggregator website, Metacritic, stated that A-Men 2's PlayStation 3 release received "generally unfavorable reviews", and scored 34% whilst the Vita release received "Mixed or average reviews" and scored 58.
