= Madden NFL 2000 =

1999 American football video game

- Developers: EA Tiburon; Tiertex Design Studios (GBC)
- Publishers: EA Sports; Aspyr Media (Mac OS); THQ (GBC)
- Series: Madden NFL
- Platforms: PlayStation, Game Boy Color, Nintendo 64, Windows, Mac OS
- Release: PlayStation: NA: August 17, 1999; EU: 1999; Game Boy Color: EU: August 1999; NA: October 26, 1999; Nintendo 64 & Windows: NA: August 31, 1999; UK: September 18, 1999 (PC); Macintosh: NA: November 16, 1999
- Genre: Sports
- Modes: Single-player, multiplayer

Madden NFL 2000 (also known as Madden 2000) is a football video game developed by EA Tiburon and published by EA Sports in 1999 for PlayStation, Nintendo 64, and Microsoft Windows. A Mac OS port was published by Aspyr Media; it was the first football game ever ported to Mac.

== Changes ==
Franchise mode was improved somewhat and multiple owners can now participate in the same season. Unlike the previous version, Madden NFL 2000 allows the user to delegate off-season duties to the CPU, such as re-signing/releasing players, drafting future stars, etc. For the second straight year, created players cannot be added to their respective teams, as well as to the list of free agents. Before a franchise can begin, the player must add all 31 coaches from the 1999 NFL season, but this is only exclusive to the PC download version.

== Reception ==
Reception

Aggregate score
Aggregator	Score				
Aggregator	GBC	Macintosh	N64	PC	PS
GameRankings	73%	80%	89%	82%	86%

Review scores
Publication	Score				
Publication	GBC	Macintosh	N64	PC	PS
CNET Gamecenter	N/A	N/A	N/A	8/10	9/10
Computer Gaming World	N/A	N/A	N/A	4/5	N/A
Electronic Gaming Monthly	N/A	N/A	8.5/10	N/A	8.75/10
Game Informer	7.75/10	N/A	N/A	N/A	8.75/10
GameFan	N/A	N/A	87% (Note: In GameFan's viewpoint of the Nintendo 64 and PlayStation versions, one critic gave them each a score of 90, and another gave them each 84.)	N/A	87% (R.M.) 68%
GameRevolution	N/A	N/A	N/A	N/A	A−
GameSpot	7.9/10	N/A	9.4/10	7.4/10	9.3/10
IGN	7/10	8/10	8.4/10	8/10	8.6/10
MacLife	N/A	"Spiffy"	N/A	N/A	N/A
Next Generation	N/A	N/A	N/A	N/A	3/5
Nintendo Power	N/A	N/A	7.4/10	N/A	N/A
Official U.S. PlayStation Magazine	N/A	N/A	N/A	N/A	5/5
PC Accelerator	N/A	N/A	N/A	8/10	N/A
PC Gamer (US)	N/A	N/A	N/A	90%	N/A

The game received "favorable" reviews on all platforms except the Game Boy Color version, which received "average" reviews, according to video game review aggregator GameRankings. Pete Wilton of Official UK PlayStation Magazine gave the PlayStation version a Starplayer award, saying, "Madden NFL 2000 is more of a sim than an arcade game and so will never reach beyond the hardcore fans. That said, it could still teach many a soccer game a thing or two about capturing the true drama of a sporting contest." However, Greg Orlando of NextGen said of the same console version, "Madden loyalists will find more to love, but this franchise still plays second fiddle to GameDay."

Alexander Goldman of AllGame gave the PlayStation version four-and-a-half stars out of five, saying, "No matter what your preference, Arcade or simulation, realism or fantasy, Madden NFL 2000 has all of the pieces in place to make it the best football game available for the PlayStation as of 1999." Brad Cook gave the Nintendo 64 version four stars out of five, saying, "While Madden 2000 has made plenty of improvements, it still lags in some areas and even downgraded its play in a couple. This leaves it far from perfect, but it's still a lot of fun, and the addition of the franchise mode is a welcome new feature in the Nintendo 64 version which will keep you playing with your favorite team for a long time." He also gave the PC version three stars, calling it "a worthy addition to the long line of Madden football games. It would have been close to perfect if the audio was better. I'd also like to see more elements from real football telecasts such as more complete sidelines and shots of the crowds cheering in future editions, but in general I'm satisfied with Madden NFL 2000 and would recommend it to anyone who likes football videogames." However, Cook gave the Game Boy Color version two-and-a-half stars, saying, "Translating any sports game to the Nintendo Game Boy Color is a tough task, and football by its very nature is probably the hardest of them all. Because the action takes place over a wide area of the playing field, it's impossible to get everything onscreen even in a console or PC game. Take a look at the tiny screen on the GBC and you'll know that the developers had a rough road ahead of them when trying to port Madden NFL 2000 to the 8-bit system." Sal Accardo of GameSpy gave the PC version 83%, saying, "All in all, Madden NFL 2000 is probably the best all-around football game yet developed for the PC. In a sea of underachievers, this might not be saying much, but the game is so enjoyable and has so many interesting features that NFL fans will find it hard to keep from loading it up again and again."

Dr. Zombie of GamePro called the Nintendo 64 version "a no-brainer must-buy if you don't already own a football game for the N64, and hardcore Madden players will go nuts over the excellent mechanics. The Madden magic works again!" (Note: GamePro gave the Nintendo 64 version three 4.5/5 scores for graphics, sound, and control, and 5/5 for overall fun factor in one review.) Scarry Larry called the same console version "the ultimate in football, and the reigning king on the Nintendo 64", (Note: GamePro gave the Nintendo 64 version 4.5/5 for graphics, 3.5/5 for sound, 4/5 for control, and 5/5 for overall fun factor in another review.) while also saying of the PlayStation version, "If you've never picked a Madden up before, this is not the one that will warm its way into your heart. However, if you like your football tough and real, you won't find a better game in town." (Note: GamePro gave the PlayStation version two 4.5/5 scores for graphics and control, 4/5 for sound, and 5/5 for overall fun factor.) Willem Knibbe called the PC version "a nice extra in a game that doesn't really need gimmicks. Madden NFL 2000's excellent strategy and beautiful graphics alone will take it to the Super Bowl." (Note: GamePro gave the PC version two 4/5 scores for graphics and sound, 5/5 for control, and 4.5/5 for overall fun factor.) William Abner of Computer Games Strategy Plus gave the same PC version four stars out of five, saying, "Madden 2000 is not perfect. It's not a seamless blend of arcade action and realistic simulation. But it's closer to that than anything we have seen thus far and more importantly—it's downright fun to play. Even if you have never been a fan of this series you owe it to yourself to give the game a look. Madden 2000 is a winner."

The PC version sold 155,071 copies in the U.S. by April 2000.

The PlayStation version was nominated for CNET Gamecenter's "Best PlayStation Game" award, which ultimately went to Tony Hawk's Pro Skater. Likewise the PC version (mislabeled as "John Madden Football 2000") was nominated for Computer Gaming World's "Sports Game of the Year" award, which went to High Heat Baseball 2000.
