= Sadness (video game) =

Cancelled Wii video game

- Developer: Nibris
- Designer: Piotr Bielatowicz
- Writer: Adam Artur Antolski
- Composers: Arkadiusz Reikowski; Łukasz Babieno
- Engine: Gamebryo
- Platform: Wii
- Release: Cancelled
- Genre: Survival horror
- Mode: Single-player

Sadness was a survival horror game in development by Nibris for the Wii, and was one of the earliest titles announced for the system. While the game initially drew positive attention for its unique gameplay concepts, such as black-and-white graphics and emphasis on psychological horror over violence, Sadness became notorious when no evidence of a playable build was ever publicly released during the four years it spent in development. It was revealed that Sadness had entered development hell due to problems with deadlines and relationships with external developers, leading to its eventual cancellation by 2010, along with the permanent closure of the company.

== Concept ==
Sadness was promoted as a unique and realistic survival horror game that would "surprise players," focusing on psychological horror rather than violence, containing "associations with narcolepsy, nyctophobia and paranoid schizophrenia." More notable was the announcement that the game would sport black-and-white visuals stylized as gothic horror.

Nibris promised that Sadness would provide "extremely innovative game play," fully utilizing the motion sensing capabilities of both the Wii Remote and the Nunchuk. For example, it was suggested that players would use the Wii Remote to wield a torch and wave it to scare off rats; swinging the controller like a lasso in order to throw a rope over a wall; or picking up items by reaching out with the Wii Remote and grabbing them. Sadness was also planned to have open-ended interactivity between the player and the game's objects, being able to use any available item as a weapon. Suggestions included breaking a glass bottle and using the shards as a knife, or breaking the leg off a chair and using it as a club. The game would also not utilize in-game menus (all game saves would be done in the background) nor a HUD in favor of greater immersion.

=== Story ===
Set in pre-World War I Russian Empire (modern Ukraine), Sadness was to follow the player character Maria Lengyel, a Victorian-era aristocrat of Polish-Hungarian descent who has to protect her son Alexander after their train to Lviv derails in the countryside. Alexander, who is struck blind by the accident, begins to exhibit strange behavior that progressively worsens. The game's scenarios and enemies, such as those based on the werewolf and the likho, are inspired by Slavic mythology. In order to "make the player feel that he is participating in events [and] not merely playing a game," the game was planned to feature a branching storyline, influenced by the player's actions and concluding with one out of ten possible endings.

== History ==
Sadness was announced by Nibris on March 7, 2006 as a title for Nintendo's Revolution (before its final name "Wii" was announced), later releasing a live action concept trailer which demonstrated potential Wii Remote control in gameplay. Nibris partnered with Frontline Studios, who would be in charge of the game programming, and Digital Amigos, who would develop the game visuals, and it was reported that the game would be released by the fourth quarter of 2007.

From 2007 onward, Nibris drew criticism from various websites and blogs for lack of evidence of the game in action, such as playable demos, trailers, or screenshots. Speculation that Sadness was vaporware intensified following a number of events, particularly the announcement that Frontline Studios was no longer working on the project (citing "artistic differences") and the game's delay to 2009. Several Nibris announcements were never realized, such as a new trailer by late 2007 or an appearance at the 2008 Game Developer's Conference. Joystiq labeled Sadness as both a "comedy of errors" and a "public embarrassment." Fog Studios, Nibris' marketing partner, responded to the accusations on vaporware on at least two occasions, once in June 2008 and again in September 2009, insisting that Sadness development was still underway, but was in need of a publisher.

In May 2009, N-Europe interviewed Adam Artur Antolski, a former Nibris employee and scriptwriter for Sadness, who revealed that constant failures to meet deadlines were caused by prolonged dispute over its design, with little consensus made among the staff and with Frontline. Antolski stated that progress made during the first year included completion of the script, concept design, and "only one 3D object – some minecart I believe." When asked regarding an announcement that Nibris would be present at that year's Electronic Entertainment Expo, Antolski responded "Nibris always was better in promoting than making anything." Nibris was later absent from E3 2009, and the game silently missed the projected 2009 release date.

Nibris' official website, which had not been updated since its announcement of appearing at GDC 2008, closed in February 2010. On April 5, N-Europe reported that Arkadiusz Reikowski, one of the game's music composers, released some of his unfinished work to the public and confirmed that Sadness had been abandoned by Nibris and was no longer in the works. In October, Nibris itself transformed into a coordinator for the European Center of Games, ceasing game development permanently, and remaining staff and projects were also reported to have been handed over to Bloober Team, another game developer.
