= The Medium (video game) =

2021 video game

- Developer: Bloober Team
- Publisher: Bloober Team SA
- Director: Mateusz Lenart
- Producer: Jacek Zięba
- Designer: Wojciech Piejko
- Programmer: Mariusz Szaflik
- Artist: Damian Żukowski
- Writers: Grzegorz Like; Andrzej Mądrzak; Marcin Wełnicki
- Composers: Arkadiusz Reikowski; Akira Yamaoka
- Engine: Unreal Engine 4
- Platforms: Windows; Xbox Series X/S; PlayStation 5; macOS; Nintendo Switch
- Release: Windows, Xbox Series X/S; January 28, 2021; PlayStation 5; September 3, 2021; Amazon Luna; February 17, 2022; Nintendo Switch; June 29, 2023; macOS; August 31, 2023
- Genres: Psychological horror, adventure
- Mode: Single-player

The Medium is a psychological horror video game developed and published by Bloober Team. It was released for Windows and Xbox Series X/S on January 28, 2021, for PlayStation 5 on September 3, 2021, for Amazon Luna on February 17, 2022, and for macOS on August 31, 2023. A Nintendo Switch version was released on July 29, 2023.

== Gameplay ==
A puzzle is solved between realities, unveiling a spirit well.

The Medium is a psychological horror game played in third-person as Marianne, a medium who can travel into the spirit realm. Being able to inhabit both worlds aids puzzle solving. Her psychic abilities may also be used against hostile forces and are recharged by interacting with energy spots called spirit wells.

== Plot ==
The Medium is set in post-communist Poland in 1999. Marianne, a spirit medium that helps troubled souls seek final respite, has a recurring dream of a man shooting a young girl by a lake. While grieving over the death of her foster father, Marianne receives a mysterious phone call from a man named Thomas, who knows of her abilities. Thomas offers to explain the origin of Marianne's powers, as well as the meaning of the dream. However, he is only willing to talk if Marianne agrees to meet him at the Niwa Workers' Resort, an abandoned communist-era vacation resort in the Polish wilderness. The Resort had been shuttered by the government years earlier after an event called the Niwa Massacre, in which a large number of people were murdered and the survivors fled the area.

While exploring Niwa, Marianne finds the place has strong ties to the spirit realm, and evidence that Thomas, the resort's manager, and his daughter Lilianne were at the epicentre of the Niwa Massacre. In the spirit world, she encounters Sadness, the spirit of a young girl who warns her of the Maw, a hostile and malevolent spirit that has managed to also partially exist in the real world. The Maw was responsible for the Niwa Massacre by occupying human hosts and using their bodies to murder others, and begins hunting down Marianne to sate its hunger and escape Niwa. Marianne repeatedly offers to send Sadness to her peace, but she refuses. Through her visions, Marianne finds out that Sadness is the spirit of Lilianne, who was molested by Thomas' older and trusted friend Richard.

Marianne pieces together enough clues to learn that Thomas was also a medium, and due to this was experimented on by Nazis and Soviets, who found out that his powers could be used to sever people's minds from their bodies. Eventually Thomas fled back to Poland, hiding at Niwa and starting a family, but an agent of Służba Bezpieczeństwa named Henry discovered him. Henry subdued Thomas and forced him to watch as he set fire to Thomas' home with his children inside, causing Thomas to attack and murder him. Marianne comes to realize that she is Thomas' youngest daughter, having fallen into a coma after the fire, and that Thomas left her at the hospital while he remained with Lilianne at Niwa.

Marianne discovers a fallout bunker hidden beneath the ruins of her family home where she encounters Thomas' spirit half. He explains to Marianne that Lilianne had trouble controlling her own powers, so Thomas kept her confined in the bunker. However, this did not stop Lilianne's powers from going out of control, and after she was raped by Richard, she created the Maw as the manifestation of her tormented soul. Eventually the Maw broke out of the bunker and caused the Niwa Massacre. While Thomas' spirit half is confident that Thomas would never hurt Lilianne, he is unaware of Thomas' current whereabouts. As the Maw approaches, Thomas' spirit half assures Marianne that she is the only one that can end this, and sends her off, preparing to sacrifice himself to delay the Maw.

Still troubled over Lilianne's fate, Marianne leaves the bunker and heads for the lake that she saw in her dreams. There, she encounters Lilianne, who explains that the dream Marianne has been seeing is not a memory of the past, but a vision of the future. She then hands Marianne a gun and pleads with her to kill her, as the Maw cannot be banished as long as she is alive; explaining why Sadness, her spirit, refused to be sent off to peace. Marianne hesitates, and, considering Thomas' words, threatens to kill herself instead, as without her as a medium, the Maw will remain trapped in Niwa forever. The Maw then arrives, forcing Marianne to fire, but it is left unclear as to whom she shoots.

In a post-credits scene, a man is seen wandering the spirit world, stopping briefly to pick up Thomas' pocketwatch.

== Development ==
The Medium was developed by Bloober Team, with lead designer Wojciech Piejko and producer Jacek Zieba coming up with the idea in 2012. The core concepts of the game had been about a medium and her abilities to see two worlds simultaneously. Piejko said The Medium imparts the message that "there is no universal truth".

They had originally planned for release on the Xbox 360, PlayStation 3, and Wii U in 2012, but rendering two point-of-views at the same time was a technical challenge for these platforms, and Bloober Team shelved the idea. In the following years, the concept of The Medium became its own type of mythos within Bloober as the company waited for technology to catch up. After Microsoft provided developers with preliminary material on the upcoming capabilities of the Xbox Series X/S consoles (which were released in November 2020), Bloober Team recognized they could now build out The Medium and began development.

Initially they approached the game with a first-person perspective, splitting the player's screen in two. After deciding to have Marianne exist in both the real and spirit world as to handle the situation with collisions, they found initial playtesters had difficulty maneuvering in this view, often twice going over an area to first focus on one world's view and then to focus on the other. They took cues from Japanese horror games like Silent Hill and Resident Evil which used fixed cameras and third-person perspective to better present the game for players to see both worlds at the same time while capturing the spirit of these horror games. This also helped to enhance the player's immersion in the game. They maintained this split-screen concept in cutscenes as well, though frequently switching up camera angles. This partially was used to mask unrendered details in some settings, but was also used to keep a sense of unease as when Marianne has a conversation with characters in the spirit world, while her real self is shown interacting with nothing.

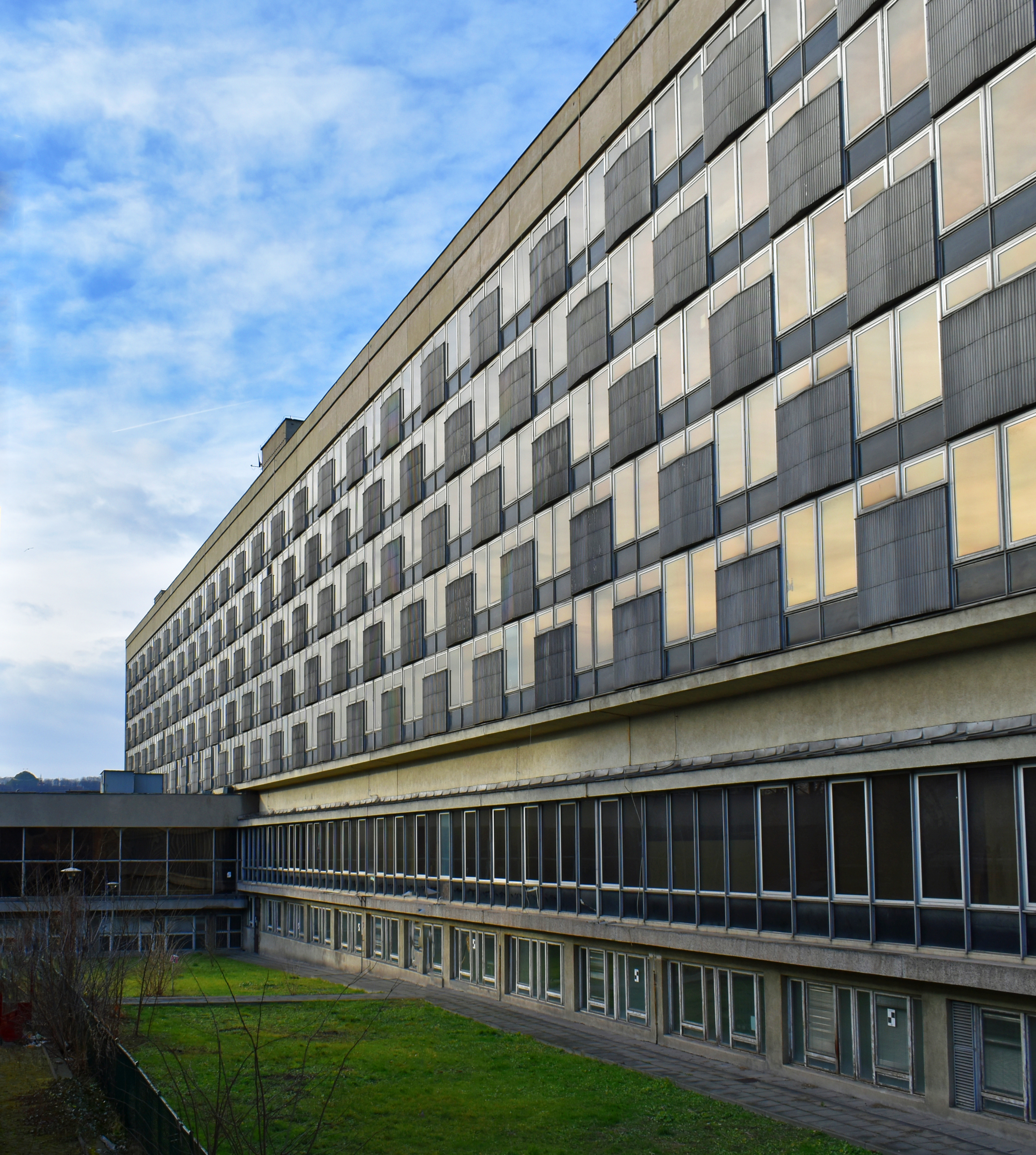
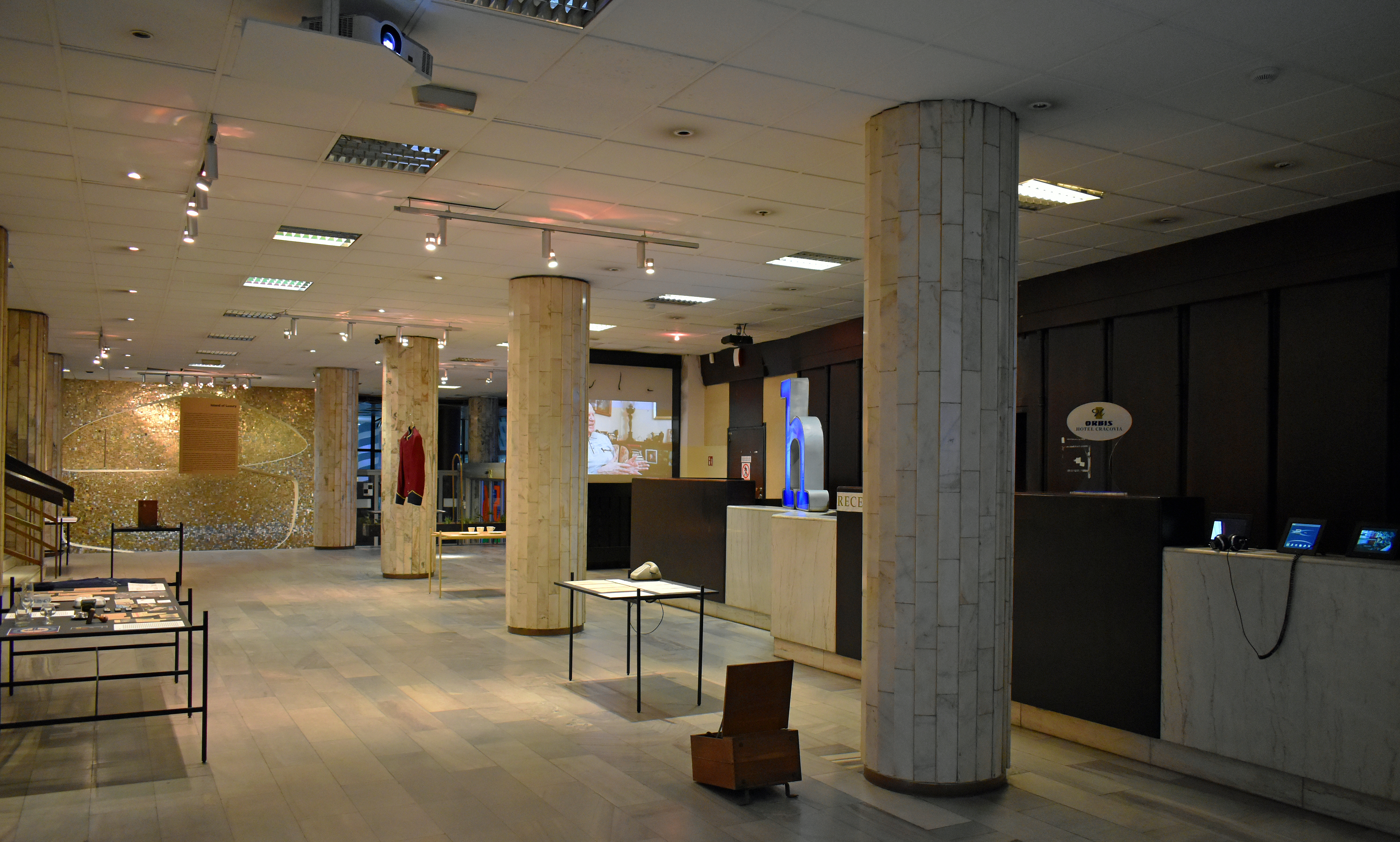
Both the exterior and interiors of Hotel Cracovia in Kraków were used for the inspiration for Niwa in The Medium.

They had chosen Poland during the 1990s, following its transition from a communistic to a democratic government in 1989, as the game's setting, as the nation's history represented the nature of duality, an overarching theme of the game. Aware that the post-war era as well as the more recent democratic era were not well known to an international audience, part of Bloober Team's goal was to make the setting approachable to the wide audience, and covered both aspects of these parts of Poland's history within the game. They recognized that with the success of their prior game Observer as well as interest in television shows about the Eastern Bloc such as Chernobyl and Dark, the Polish setting would be of interest to players. The Soviet-era Hotel Niwa is based on a one-to-one rendition of the existing Hotel Cracovia located in Kraków. The opening apartments at the start of the game, while based on a real building in Kraków, is an Easter egg to Observer: System Redux, where the same building is also present in that game's future setting. They modelled the supernatural setting after Zdzisław Beksiński's dystopian surrealist artwork.

Audio for the game was made by a "Silent Hill dream team" according to Bloober Team, including Silent Hill series composer Akira Yamaoka, singer Mary Elizabeth McGlynn, and voice actor Troy Baker; Yamaoka was persuaded to take on the music when Piejko gave him a gameplay demonstration. Yamaoka and composer Arkadiusz Reikowski were tasked with scoring the physical and spiritual plane, respectively. Using synthesiser and analogue sounds, Reikowski likened his approach to that of Stranger Things and Chernobyl. Baker voices the primary antagonist, known as the Maw, for whom another actor performed the motion capture on stilts. Actor Kelly Burke provided the voice for protagonist Marianne, with Weronika Rosati and Marcin Dorociński providing design and motion capture for Marianne and Thomas within the game. The developers had planned out the camera and actor's direction for motion capture prior to the onset of the COVID-19 pandemic, which made it easy to complete the motion capture sessions under COVID-19 regulations during 2020. Overall, the game has about 90 minutes of motion capture. While the game takes place in Poland, Bloober Team specifically chose to have the characters speak with American accents as to make the game approachable. The team had planned to include the option to switch dialog to Polish voice-overs with English subtitles but the pandemic caused them to fall back on this plan.

== Release ==
Following its initial 2012 announcement and subsequent drawback, The Medium was reannounced in May 2020 to be released for Windows and Xbox Series X/S. Originally scheduled for 10 December 2020, the release was eventually delayed to January 28, 2021, due to the pandemic. A PlayStation 5 version was released on September 3, 2021, with a version for Amazon Luna releasing on February 17, 2022. A Nintendo Switch cloud version released on July 29, 2023. A planned summer release for macOS and Apple Silicon was announced on February 16, 2023.

== Reception ==
Reception

Aggregate score
Aggregator	Score
Metacritic	PC: 75/100; PS5: 75/100; XSX: 71/100

Review scores
Publication	Score
Destructoid	6/10
Electronic Gaming Monthly	4/5
Game Informer	6.75/10
GameRevolution	7/10
GameSpot	9/10
GamesRadar+	2.5/5
Hardcore Gamer	4/5
IGN	8/10
PC Gamer (US)	92/100
PCGamesN	6/10
Shacknews	6/10
VG247	3/5
VideoGamer.com	5/10

The Medium received "generally favorable" or "mixed or average" reviews, depending on the platform, according to review aggregator platform Metacritic. IGN awarded the game an 8/10, stating "Brilliantly paced and palpably tense, The Medium is a psychological horror adventure that's all thriller and no filler."

Bloober Team reported that within a few days of launch, they had been able to turn a profit from the development of The Medium from its initial sales. The game was nominated for best action adventure and best indie game at Gamescom 2020.

== Film adaptation ==
Gary Dauberman announced in July 2025 that he and Mia Maniscalco will produce a film adaptation of The Medium via his Coin Operated label.
