= Onyx: The Dark Grip =

- Developer: Bloober Team (Note: Under co-development label Broken Mirror Games)
- Publisher: Broken Mirror Games
- Engine: Unreal Engine 5
- Platform: Nintendo Switch 2
- Release: 2027
- Genre: Survival horror
- Mode: Single-player

Onyx: The Dark Grip is an upcoming survival horror game developed by Bloober Team and published under their Broken Mirror Games label for the Nintendo Switch 2. The game's story centers on Holden, a man who has found himself inside a mysterious town populated by supernatural disturbances, and must survive while under possession by an unseen force, which is intervening with events by influencing his actions and the town's various occurrences to guide him to safety.

Presented in 2.5D, The Dark Grip is designed to be played exclusively on the Nintendo Switch 2 console in Handheld Mode, with players assuming asynchronous control over both Holden and the "Entity", the latter of whom is able to perform actions for both the character and within the town through the console's touchscreen and tilt controls, which are used to manipulate the environment for solving puzzles, as well as enabling Holden to read the minds of other people he meets throughout the story. As Holden gains awareness of said activities, the player is dually responsible for retaining his sanity while investigating the town's nature.

Bloober Team first teased the development of a game slated for Nintendo consoles in July 2024, describing it as a collaborative project with various creators worldwide and the support of Nintendo themselves. The game was officially announced in September 2026. The studio cited the Resident Evil and Silent Hill series, as well as the games Limbo (2010) and Eternal Darkness: Sanity's Requiem (2002) as influences for The Dark Grip, intending to create an experience unique to Nintendo hardware that other platforms couldn't replicate.

Onyx: The Dark Grip is scheduled to release for Nintendo Switch 2 in 2027.

== Gameplay ==
Onyx: The Dark Grip is solely playable on the Nintendo Switch 2 console itself in Handheld Mode. The protagonist Holden is controlled from a 2.5D perspective, being able to move around the game world using the console's on-board controls, and able to engage in melee combat with enemy creatures that obstruct his path. Simultaneously, the 'Entity' is asynchronously controlled during gameplay through use of the Nintendo Switch 2's touch screen and motion controls, with the player able to use the former for moving objects, opening doors, highlighting people's inner thoughts that Holden can read while conversing with them, or interacting with the environment for solving puzzles. During gameplay, Holden will begin to perceive the player's actions as the Entity, requiring the player to periodically use the Switch 2 gyroscope and tilt the console in order to "snap" him back to reality, retaining his sanity over the course of gameplay. Due to the freezing climate of the town, Holden is also at risk of developing hypothermia as he proceeds through the environment, necessitating blowing into the Switch 2's microphone in order to keep him warm before he succumbs to the cold.

== Development ==
In a July 2024 interview, Bloober Team CEO Piotr Babieno teased that the studio was involved in a co-development effort for a game codenamed "Project M", which was exclusively designed for Nintendo platforms. Despite being initially set as a collaboration with subsidiary Draw Distance Games, the studio had terminated their contract by the time of the interview, with the game now slated to be completed by core Bloober Team staff. At this stage, Nintendo had not yet revealed their next console, the Nintendo Switch 2, for which the game was being developed. In August 2025 following the console's release, Babien expressed a desire to make the platform a home for horror games, citing the releases of Eternal Darkness: Sanity's Requiem, Resident Evil Zero (both 2002) and Resident Evil 4 (2005) on GameCube as an example of how prior Nintendo systems represented the genre.

In December 2025, Babieno described Eternal Darkness, alongside the Resident Evil and Silent Hill series and the indie game Limbo (2010), as primary inspirations for Project M, while also implying that it would feature concepts that could only be realized on Nintendo Switch 2's hardware, additionally suggesting the game "would never have had a chance to exist" without the supervision and assistance of Nintendo's own staff in realizing the game. In a May 2026 LinkedIn post, Babieno outlined the goal of using the console's unique strengths such as its hybrid nature and controllers, to guide the game's immersion and corresponding player behavior.

== Release ==
Onyx: The Dark Grip was first trademarked by Bloober Team in January 2026. The game was officially unveiled in September 2026 during a Nintendo Direct presentation, to be published under Bloober Team's Broken Mirror Games label. The game is set to be released for Nintendo Switch 2 in 2027.
