= Nibris =

Polish video game developer

- Type: Video game development
- Industry: Video games
- Defunct: 2010
- Headquarters: Kraków, Poland
- Number of employees: 14+
- Website: http://www.nibris.net/ (Closed)

Nibris was a video game development company located in Kraków, Poland, developing primarily for the Nintendo DS and Wii video game consoles. Nibris was most known for its cancelled Wii project Sadness, a survival horror game. The company no longer exists; its official website closed in February 2010, making Double Bloob their only game developed, and was reported later in October to have been transformed into a coordinator for the European Center of Games, ceasing game development permanently. Remaining Nibris staff and projects were also reported to have been handed over to Bloober Team, another game developer.

== Announced projects ==
- Sadness (Wii) (Cancelled)
- The Children of the Night (Nintendo DS) (Cancelled)
- Raid over the River (Wii, Nintendo DS) (Cancelled)
- Double Bloob (Wii, Nintendo's DSiWare) (Released December 1, 2010)
