= Layers of Fear (2023 video game) =

Video game remake

- Developer: Bloober Team
- Publisher: Bloober Team
- Series: Layers of Fear
- Engine: Unreal Engine 5
- Platforms: macOS; PlayStation 5; Windows; Xbox Series X/S; Nintendo Switch 2
- Release: macOS, PS5, Windows, Xbox Series X/S; June 15, 2023; Nintendo Switch 2; December 19, 2025
- Mode: Single-player

Layers of Fear (Note: Originally known as Layers of Fears) is a horror game developed and published by Bloober Team. It is a remake of the 2016 game Layers of Fear and its sequel Layers of Fear 2 (2019), combining stories from the previous games with new content. The game was released for macOS, PlayStation 5, Windows, and Xbox Series X/S in June 2023. It was released for the Nintendo Switch 2 on December 19th, 2025. It received generally favourable reviews from critics.

== Development ==
Layers of Fear was created in Unreal Engine 5. The game was inspired by the cancelled Silent Hill game P.T.

== Plot ==
Players begin the game as the Writer, who serves as the catalyst to tie all the previous Layers of Fear stories together. Each chapter of the game revolves around the Writer as she makes her way through the Painter's story (from the plot of the first Layers of Fear), then the Actor's story (from Layers of Fear 2). There are DLCs that can be accessed through the Writer's story along the way. They include the original game's DLC, Inheritance, which focused on the Painter's daughter. There were two new DLCs added to the game, which are The Final Note, which is the story about the Painter's wife, and The Final Prologue, which is about the Director from the Actor's Story.

== Reception ==
Reception

Aggregate score
Aggregator	Score
Metacritic	(PC) 73/100 (PS5) 75/100 (XSX) 72/100

Layers of Fear received "mixed or average" reviews from critics for the Xbox Series X/S and PC versions, while the PS5 version received "generally favorable" reviews, according to review aggregator website Metacritic.

Critics generally praised the introduction of a new framing story to combine the narratives from the previous games. Its environment and visual design were also praised, although many critics felt that it was not very terrifying.

Dakota Evans, in a review for Game Rant, described it as "a beautiful yet terrifying game that accomplishes being both a remake and a sequel simultaneously." Lewis Parker, writing for PC Gamer, praised the game's storytelling themes, favorably comparing its gameplay to the Amnesia series. Mark Delaney of GameSpot and Ashley Bardhan of Kotaku described the plot as largely disappointing despite the quality of the game's visual design. Delaney and Michael Cripe of The Escapist both described the gameplay as lacking in tension, comparing it to experiences like an amusement park ride or haunted attraction.

Some journalists found the decision to use the same name as the 2016 game confusing and unclear.
