= Basement Crawl =

2014 video game

- Developer: Bloober Team
- Publisher: Bloober Team
- Platform: PlayStation 4
- Release: NA: 25 February 2014; EU: 26 February 2014
- Genre: Action
- Modes: Single-player, multiplayer

Basement Crawl is a maze action game developed and published by Bloober Team. The game was released for the PlayStation 4 on 25 February 2014 in North America and on 26 February in Europe. It received extremely negative reviews from critics for its lack of content.

== Gameplay ==
Basement Crawl is a maze-based action game with some strategic elements. Bloober Team's main inspirations were Spy vs. Spy and Bomberman, and gameplay revolves around setting up traps (self-detonated or activated by characters approaching it or stepping on it without noticing) to hurt other players. Despite being primarily multiplayer-focused, basic single player campaigns with bots to fill in for missing characters will be available too.

Basement Crawl is a 2.5D game with dynamic cameras – to the game modes, characters and mechanics. "We felt that many games nowadays are dependent on character development or luck and randomness, so we designed Basement Crawl to exclude the luck factor and remove the dependence on leveling-up characters. We want to make Basement Crawl as skill-based as possible and focus on hardcore players instead of casual or ‘middlecore’ players."

Basement Crawl supports both 4 player hot-seat and 8 player online play, as well as combinations of both. At the beginning, players start with a selection of 4 available characters, all with their own unique skills balanced carefully against each other. The first three characters are a midget clown, a crash-test dummy, and a girl with a bear.

== Reception ==
Reception

Aggregate score
Aggregator	Score
Metacritic	27/100

Review scores
Publication	Score
Destructoid	2/10
GameSpot	3/10
IGN	3/10
Hardcore Gamer	2.5/5

Basement Crawl received "generally unfavorable" reviews, according to review aggregator website Metacritic.

Jeremy Peeples of Hardcore Gamer gave the game a 2.5/5, criticizing it for lacking content and being too similar to Bomberman, while praising it for its basic gameplay mechanics.

Gamesradar ranked the game 36th on their "The 50 Worst Games of All Time." They described the game as a boring uninspired Bomberman clone with unoriginal gameplay.

Andrew Hayward of IGN stated, "With just two modes, generic levels, a grating aesthetic, and an interface that damages the play experience, Basement Crawl would lack anything to keep us around even if it functioned soundly." He summed that all up by calling it "a limp, poorly presented, and broken Bomberman clone, and easily the worst PS4 game to date."

Chris Carter of Destructoid praised the game's premise and art style, calling it "one of the most interesting premises I’ve seen in a downloadable game in quite some time." He criticized the amount of content, calling the art style "the only thing refreshing about Basement Crawl, because everything else is absolutely bare-bones."

In response to criticism from players and reviewers, Bloober Team announced the intention to remake the game from scratch under the title Brawl. The remake would be available free of charge to people who bought Basement Crawl.
