= Treasure World =

2009 video game

- Developer: Aspyr
- Publisher: Aspyr
- Designers: Justin Leingang (director and designer); Ted Chauviere (engineer); Michael Veroni (art director); Amanda Rubright (producer)
- Platform: Nintendo DS
- Release: NA: July 2, 2009
- Genre: Augmented reality
- Mode: Single-player

Treasure World is an adventure game developed and published by Aspyr for the Nintendo DS handheld game console. The game is unique, as its gameplay consists mainly of collecting and making use of Wi-Fi signals picked up by the handheld.

== Scenario ==
Upon booting up the game, the player is introduced to the "Star Sweep", an elderly man who cleans stars, with aid of a robot named the "Wish Finder". The Star Sweep's ship crash-lands on Earth and the player is asked to refill the ship with stardust (its tank must be full before exiting Earth). The Wish Finder is tasked with helping the player, and it is revealed that it is a highly advanced robot with the ability to disguise itself by wearing different costume parts.

== Gameplay ==
The game utilizes Wi-Fi signals from the player's real-life surroundings to help detect stardust and treasures. These treasures can then be used to form musical arrangements, customize the Wish Finder, or change the environment of the game. Stardust is not only used to refill the empty tank of the ship; the Star Sweep will give players treasures in return for 20 units of stardust, and at a discount of 10 when the real-world full moon appears.

== Reception ==
Reception

Review scores
Publication	Score
GamesRadar+	8 out of 10
IGN	7.5 out of 10

IGN gave the game a score of 7.5 out of 10, with its main complaint being that there is not much to do outside of collecting treasures. They also awarded it the DS Game of the Month Award for July 2009.
