= The Sims Stories =

Series of video games released between 2007 and 2008

The Sims Stories is a series of video games from The Sims series released between 2007 and 2008, based on a modified version of The Sims 2 game engine. The modified game engine is optimized for play on systems with weaker specifications, such as laptops. As such, its system requirements are lower than that of The Sims 2, but it can still be played on desktops. The series was aimed to cater to three groups of players: players who wish to play The Sims 2 on their laptops (which usually have lower specifications); players who wish to engage in other activities such as instant messaging while playing the game; and players who are new to the franchise. Titles in this series are categorized as "laptop-friendly" since they do not require a dedicated graphic card.

In addition to a freeplay Classic mode with open-ended gameplay, the games contain a structured, linear Story mode where players are required to complete a series of goals to progress in the storyline, similar to console entries in The Sims series. While Life Stories and Pet Stories each contain two separate stories, Castaway Stories contains one story that is double the length of any one story in the first two games. As an introductory series, major features are removed or modified from those in The Sims 2, possibly to simplify gameplay. For example, fears are completely removed in all three games, and the elder life stage is completely removed in Pet Stories. Officially, the save files from this series are not compatible with the main The Sims 2 games; however, players have experienced success in adapting some files. Three games in this series were released.

== Life Stories ==
The Sims Life Stories
- Developer: Maxis Redwood Shores
- Publishers: Electronic Arts (PC); Aspyr Media (Mac)
- Platforms: Mac OS X, Microsoft Windows
- Release: Windows: NA: February 6, 2007; AU: February 8, 2007; EU: February 9, 2007; OS X: NA: March 28, 2007; EU: 2007
- Genre: Social simulation
- Mode: Single-player

The Sims Life Stories is the first game in The Sims Stories series. The pack bears similarities to the console ports of The Sims games. In Story mode, it begins with the problems of Riley Harlow and Vincent Moore. Rewards are unlocked as set goals are achieved. In the open-ended Classic mode, the player creates Sims and then chooses how they will live their life, akin to typical The Sims gameplay. Life Stories was released for Microsoft Windows in February 2007, and Mac OS X by Aspyr Media later in 2007.

The game begins in Story Mode with Riley's life story as she moves from SimCity to Four Corners to start a new life with her Aunt Sharon. A second story follows the life of Vincent, a millionaire who is searching for true love. After both stories are completed the gameplay continues in the open-ended Classic mode, which is similar to The Sims 2. The towns in which Riley and Vincent live are also available to play when their stories are finished.

Aspyr released another port of Life Stories for macOS on December 3, 2015, to the Mac App Store. After the announcement of macOS Catalina dropping support for 32-bit apps, Aspyr removed the port from the Mac App Store on June 17, 2019.

=== Gameplay ===
Life Stories uses the same engine and gameplay mechanics as The Sims 2. In addition to the open-ended freeplay mode from The Sims 2, Life Stories features two pre-defined scenarios. In each scenario the player takes control of one of two protagonists and is tasked with accomplishing various goals in that character's life. The game features significant use of scripted sequences to create pre-defined dramatic events and situations. There are three neighborhoods to play – one for each of the two stories, as well as a freeplay neighborhood. Several objects from various The Sims 2 packs are made available in Life Stories, such as the bowling alley from The Sims 2: Nightlife and pool table from The Sims 2: University.

=== Reception ===
The Sims: Life Stories

Aggregate score
Aggregator	Score
Metacritic	72/100

Review scores
Publication	Score
Edge	5/10
Eurogamer	7/10
GamesMaster	82%
GameZone	7.5/10
IGN	7.3/10
Jeuxvideo.com	12/20
MacLife	(Mac) 3/5
Macworld	(Mac) 4/5
PALGN	5/10
PC Format	70%
PC Gamer (UK)	62%
PC Gamer (US)	91%
PC Zone	57%
X-Play	3/5
Detroit Free Press	2/4
The Sydney Morning Herald	4/5

Life Stories received "mixed or average" reviews according to the review aggregation website Metacritic. IGN praised the low system requirements but criticized its inability of allowing players to make their own stories. 4Players gave it 74%. Gamekult gave the game five out of ten, saying that the game "offers a rather unoriginal approach to the world of The Sims: the objectives to be met and the following story may innovate a little on what the series has usually offered us, [but] all of the gameplay and the actions carried out remain far too close to The Sims 2 to truly impress."

== Pet Stories ==
The Sims Pet Stories
- Developer: Maxis Redwood Shores
- Publishers: Electronic Arts (PC); Aspyr Media (Mac)
- Platforms: Windows, Mac OS X
- Release: Windows: NA: June 19, 2007; EU: June 22, 2007; AU: September 6, 2007; OS X: NA: September 9, 2007
- Genre: Social simulation
- Mode: Single player

The Sims Pet Stories is the second game released in The Sims Stories series, released for Microsoft Windows in June 2007, and for Mac OS X by Aspyr Media on September 9, 2007. Aspyr released another port of The Sims Pet Stories for macOS on December 17, 2015, to the Mac App Store. After the announcement of macOS Catalina dropping support for 32-bit apps, Aspyr removed the port from the Mac App Store on June 17, 2019, though it still remains available to play for users on older versions of macOS who previously purchased the game.

=== Features ===
Pet Stories challenges Sims to care for and train pets, similar to The Sims 2: Pets. Much like its predecessor, this game is optimized for laptops and features both story and free play modes. Players can also raise and train pets in the game like The Sims 2.

In this game, two new stories are introduced, Best in Show and Midnight Masquerade. The first story features Alice, a woman who faces financial problems and is about to lose her home. So she enters her pet Dalmatian into a local dog show to try to earn enough money to save her house. The second story is about a successful executive chef named Stephen, whose world is turned upside down when an obnoxious cat comes to live with him.

There is a neutral town titled Arbor Falls, where the player can play in Free Mode and does not have to follow a story line. Free Mode is similar to the regular The Sims 2, allowing players to raise a family, buy pets, go out, and date, which was previously a feature in The Sims 2: Nightlife. Pet Stories also introduced new objects, such as games for pets and musical instruments, and building opportunities including new paintings and floor patterns.

=== Reception ===
The Sims: Pet Stories

Aggregate score
Aggregator	Score
Metacritic	67/100

Review scores
Publication	Score
4Players	69%
Eurogamer	7/10
Gamekult	4/10
GamesMaster	83%
Jeuxvideo.com	13/20
PC Format	66%
PC Gamer (UK)	78%
PC Zone	44%

Pet Stories received "mixed or average" reviews according to Metacritic.

== Castaway Stories ==
The Sims Castaway Stories
- Developer: Maxis Redwood Shores
- Publishers: Electronic Arts (PC); Aspyr Media (Mac)
- Platforms: Windows, Mac OS X
- Release: Windows: NA: January 29, 2008; EU: February 1, 2008; AU: February 7, 2008; OS X 2008
- Genre: Social simulation
- Mode: Single player

The Sims Castaway Stories is the third and final game in The Sims Stories series. It was released in 2008, with a port for Mac OS X released by Aspyr Media.

The Sims 2: Castaway is the console equivalent to Castaway Stories, sharing similar gameplay and concepts. An updated version of the macOS port was released on December 10, 2015, to the Mac App Store by Aspyr. After the announcement of macOS Catalina dropping support for 32-bit apps, Aspyr removed the port from the Mac App Store on June 17, 2019, though it still remains available to play for users on older versions of macOS who previously purchased the game.

=== Features ===
Castaway Stories features the choice of either playing in a story-driven mode titled "Shipwrecked and Single" or a more sandbox oriented mode "Wanmami Island".

In the "Shipwrecked and Single" mode, the player is subjected to a semi-linear scenario-driven style of gameplay. The player must choose whether to play as David Bennett, Jessica Knight, or a customized Sim, who boards a cruise ship for singles named Solomon Queen, only to have it crash and leave them drifting on the ocean clinging to a crate. The crate happens to float onto land, after which the player is left to help the Sim survive.

Gameplay on Wanmami Island is much more open-ended, enabling gameplay reminiscent of more traditional Sims games. The player is allowed to design their own Family and start Jobs.

=== Comparison to other The Sims titles ===
- The clock format used in the game is represented visually instead of numerically. There are eight orbs representing the 24 hours of the day, with one orb being equivalent to 3 hours.
- The currency used in the game are Resources rather than Simoleons. Sims can choose a career as a Gatherer, Hunter, or Crafter in an effort to earn Food and Resources. All jobs have the same working hours and Sims are to work daily; however, there are no penalties for missing work.
- All of the objects, clothing, and building tools available in the Sims series are designed to fit the Tropical and Tiki themes. Most of the icons used in the game are also designed to fit the theme.
- If a Sim wants to go to a community lot, they must go through a portal and go to adjacent lots or use their map for instant travel.
- Unlike the other releases in The Sims Stories series, Castaway Stories offers one 24-chapter story, compared to Life Stories and Pet Stories which offer two 12-chapter stories. Moreover, some of the rewards are not directly delivered to the main character. They have to dig at the shore to unlock them.
- Castaway Stories allows multiple player profiles to be saved, saving the need to delete profiles to reset the game; however, sometimes this may interfere with one of the other files.

=== Reception ===
The Sims: Castaway Stories

Aggregate score
Aggregator	Score
Metacritic	73/100

Review scores
Publication	Score
4Players	72%
Gamekult	4/10
IGN	7.3/10
Jeuxvideo.com	14/20
PC Format	76%
PC Gamer (UK)	82%
PC Gamer (US)	83%
PC Zone	48%

Castaway Stories received "mixed or average reviews" according to Metacritic. PC Gamer praised the low system requirements, the music, and the original setting, as well as the low retail price, but noted that there are a few bugs and long loading times. IGN said, "The Sims: Castaway Stories is the first game in the entire series that really feels different despite being based on the same engine and principles", but also said that there is little to no replayability. Some critics enjoyed the game less than others. PC Zone said, "By peddling this sort of single-minded crud to children EA are creating a new generation of absolute morons who won't be able to think one step ahead of themselves."

== See also ==
- The Sims 2: Castaway
- The Sims Medieval
