= Observer (video game) =

2017 video game

- Developer: Bloober Team
- Publisher: Aspyr
- Designer: Wojciech Piejko
- Programmer: Mariusz Szaflik
- Artist: Mateusz Lenart
- Writer: Andrzej Mądrzak
- Composer: Arkadiusz Reikowski
- Engine: Unreal Engine 4
- Platforms: Microsoft Windows; PlayStation 4; Xbox One; Linux; macOS; Nintendo Switch; Amazon Luna; PlayStation 5; Xbox Series X/S; Nintendo Switch 2
- Release: 15 August 2017: Windows, PS4, Xbox One; WW: 15 August 2017 Linux, macOS; WW: 24 October 2017 Nintendo Switch; WW: 7 February 2019 System Redux Windows, Xbox Series X/S; WW: 10 November 2020 PlayStation 5; NA/OC: 12 November 2020; WW: 19 November 2020 Amazon Luna; US: 25 March 2021 PlayStation 4, Xbox One; WW: 16 July 2021 Nintendo Switch 2; WW: 18 June 2026
- Genre: Psychological horror
- Mode: Single-player

Observer (stylised as >observer_) is a psychological horror video game developed by Bloober Team and published by Aspyr. It was released for Microsoft Windows, PlayStation 4 and Xbox One in August 2017, followed by versions for Linux, macOS and Nintendo Switch. An upgraded and expanded version called Observer: System Redux was released in November 2020 for Windows, PlayStation 5, and Xbox Series X/S, for Amazon Luna in March 2021, for PlayStation 4 and Xbox One in July 2021, and for Nintendo Switch 2 in June 2026. Observer follows Daniel Lazarski, a detective known as an Observer, who can hack people's minds as a method of interrogation.

A team of around thirty developed the game using the Unreal Engine 4. It stars Rutger Hauer, who was also in Blade Runner, one of the primary influences. Arkadiusz Reikowski composed the score, infusing it with choral, diegetic and ambient music. Observer received generally favourable reviews. Critics praised the world design, visual effects and hacking sequences but criticised the stealth and its focus on style over substance.

== Gameplay ==
Daniel's Electromagnetic Vision scans for a brain implant.

Observer is a psychological horror video game played from a first-person perspective. The player controls Daniel Lazarski, a Krakowian detective of the Observers police unit. He can hack people's brain implants with a device known as the Dream Eater, for interrogation purposes. Equipped with augmented vision split into Electromagnetic Vision—which scans for electronic devices—and Bio Vision—which scans for biological evidence—he is able to analyse and highlight certain objects in his environment. Objects can be interacted with and examined, while dialogue trees are used for speaking with non-player characters. Nanophage cards, patient records, radio-controlled cars and roses serve as collectibles. A mini-game called With Fire and Sword: Spiders is accessed through computer terminals, which can also read documents.

== Synopsis ==
Observer is set in a cyberpunk rendition of 2084 Kraków, Poland after the nanophage, a "digital plague" that cost the lives of thousands, resulting in war and rampant drug use. After Chiron, a megacorporation, took control of Poland and manifested the Fifth Polish Republic, a police unit known as Observers was put in control of the denizens with license to hack their minds. Drug and hologram addicts were made Class C and cast off to live in tenement buildings.

One morning, Observer detective Daniel Lazarski receives a call from his estranged son Adam, whose caller ID is traced to a tenement building. Locating Adam's apartment, Daniel discovers a body missing its head. He scans a ComPass implant and sees a missed call from "H.N." Checking the tenant log, he learns the initials belong to Helena Nowak who lives in apartment 104. At this point, a lockdown has been triggered. In apartment 104, Daniel finds a man near death and hacks his brain for clues. Given a glimpse of the tattoo parlour outside, he heads to the courtyard.

Helena is found dead inside the parlour; hacking her brain reveals she was working for Adam, smuggling data out of Chiron. Daniel goes looking for Jack Karnas, the owner of the tattoo parlour, in apartment 210. He finds Jack murdered and follows a trail of the killer's blood to the attic, where he is ambushed and knocked unconscious. When he regains consciousness, he finds the killer dead and hacks the remains. Daniel continues from there into the sewers, arriving at the killer's hideout. Adam's severed head lies underneath a cover on a table. Distraught, Daniel is met with his son's voice mentioning a place called Sanctuary. He finds his way deeper underground, ending up at Sanctuary's gates.

Inside Sanctuary, Daniel meets Adam in a virtual world and learns that Adam's consciousness was transferred into a digital realm hoping it was out of Chiron's reach. However, Adam claims Chiron deployed a virus to break down his defences. Daniel is urged to manually override the signal that caused the lockdown, releasing Adam from the building's private network. In the adjoining building, Adam reveals he killed the original Adam for sending the virus after him and triggered the lockdown to lead Daniel to Sanctuary. Adam asks that he be hosted in Daniel's Observer mind to save what is left of his son; if Daniel accepts, Adam takes shared control over his body and leaves the building. If he refuses, Adam transfers Daniel's consciousness into a maintenance drone and steals his body. Daniel manages to steal the body of the drone's owner and uses it to attack Adam but is shot by police as the lockdown is finally lifted, leaving the fates of both Daniel and Adam unknown.

== Development and release ==
At Kraków-based Bloober Team, a staff, at times exceeding thirty members, developed Observer with Unreal Engine 4. By December 2015, the game was in pre-production with one of two scripts bearing its concept. Development began with the idea of changing the setting from that of the studio's previous title, Layers of Fear, to a dystopian society embellished with 1980s and '90s references to Eastern European culture and architecture, and adding in-game propaganda reminiscent of the Soviet Union. Influences included Blade Runner, Cyberpunk 2020, and comic books; all used so that the game could distinguish itself from American and Japanese cyberpunk. The ever-changing level design in hacking sequences features compression artefact effects. HRZ3D Studio worked on the opening intro; frameshunter contributed additional animations. The involvement of Rutger Hauer, who plays the lead, was revealed in July 2017: Hauer had previously starred in Blade Runner. Arkadiusz Reikowski composed the soundtrack, which was influenced by the music of Akira, Ghost in the Shell and Blade Runner. Reikowski used an analogue synthesizer to keep faithful to the atmosphere, worked with the Polish band Księżyc for the choral music (using words intended as ominous, alien and ritual) and employed diegetic music by psytrance artist Mirror Me. Przemek Laszczyk, with whom Reikowski worked on the 2015 video game Kholat, provided additional ambient music like the tattoo parlour theme.

The game was released for Microsoft Windows, PlayStation 4 and Xbox One on 15 August 2017, and launched for macOS and Linux on 24 October. Techland published a limited edition in Poland; Limited Run Games released a physical version for PlayStation 4 in July 2018. Observer was released for Nintendo Switch on 7 February 2019. Observer: System Redux, a version featuring more story content and enhanced visuals and gameplay, was released for Microsoft Windows and Xbox Series X on 10 November 2020, and for PlayStation 5 on 12 November. This version was released for Amazon Luna on 25 March 2021, for PlayStation 4 and Xbox One on 16 July 2021, and for Nintendo Switch 2 on 18 June 2026.

== Reception ==
Reception

Aggregate score
Aggregator	Score
Metacritic	PC: 78/100; PS4: 77/100; XONE: 86/100; NS: 75/100; PC (System Redux): 83/100; XSX: 79/100; PS5: 77/100

Review scores
Publication	Score
Game Informer	9/10
GameRevolution	4.5/5
GameSpot	9/10
PC Gamer (US)	45/100
Shacknews	9/10

According to Metacritic, Observer received generally favourable reviews. It was a runner-up for the Best World award at Giant Bomb's 2017 Game of the Year Awards, and won for Best Setting in Game Informer's 2017 Adventure Game of the Year Awards. Eurogamer and Polygon ranked it among the best games of 2017. The game was also nominated for Use of Sound, New IP at the National Academy of Video Game Trade Reviewers Awards, and won the award for Best Emotional Indie Game at the Emotional Games Awards 2018. Game Informer's Javy Gwaltney wrote "Observer makes the most of its fusion of cyberpunk sci-fi and terror", citing the minimalistic setting as something that distinguished it from other futuristic stories. He commended the hacking sequences for being "intense, terrifying" and interesting. The game was praised for its puzzles, consistent scares and plot revelations, which Gwaltney thought kept it from being boring, despite the lack of combat. Brittany Vincent of Game Revolution said the game was, "by far", among the best of the year. She felt the exploration was thrilling and declared the atmosphere and visual effects during hacking sequences "masterful". David Rayfield at GameSpot praised the detailed environments and found the story to be "one of the most intriguing" in the genre in years. He felt the ability to open doors inches at a time added to the horror. He liked the blend of the sound design with Reikowski’s music, and how the writing made "even the most fleeting of characters" genuine. Writing for PC Gamer, Jody Macgregor said certain moments of "surrealness" were effective, finding the visual effects "genuinely shocking" at times. The cat-and-mouse levels were lauded for "livening up the dreams". Shacknews' Chris Jarrard agreed with Rayfield that the "hyper-detailed world" made an impression. He observed a "superb" use of binaural recording and thought the pacing was "excellent".

Conversely, Gwaltney criticised Rutger Hauer's line delivery and the stealth sequences. Vincent and Rayfield both disparaged the stealth areas, calling them "frustrating". Macgregor complained that, although the visual effects looked "kind of cool", they eventually lost their appeal; similarly, he called the cat-and-mouse sequences "overused". Other complaints included the use of jump scares and a disappointing plot. Jarrard saw the exploration as "cumbersome and mildly off putting [sic]".

== Film adaptation ==
In December 2017, a film adaptation with American production company Zero Gravity was announced, increasing the value of Bloober Team's shares by over 8%.
