= InnerSpace (video game) =

2018 adventure video game

- Developer: PolyKnight Games
- Publisher: Aspyr
- Engine: Unity3D
- Platforms: Linux; Microsoft Windows; OS X; PlayStation 4; Xbox One; Nintendo Switch
- Release: WW: January 16, 2018
- Genre: Adventure
- Mode: Single-player

InnerSpace is an adventure video game developed by PolyKnight Games and published by Aspyr. It was released worldwide on January 16, 2018, for Linux, Microsoft Windows, OS X, PlayStation 4, Nintendo Switch and Xbox One.

== Development ==
InnerSpace is the first title from PolyKnight Games. Inspired by the character-driven narratives of Journey and Grow Home, development of InnerSpace was funded through Kickstarter.

The partnership between PolyKnight Games and Aspyr was announced at PAX East 2017.

== Reception ==
Reception

Aggregate score
Aggregator	Score
Metacritic	65/100 (PC); 63/100 (NS); 67/100 (PS4); 64/100 (XONE)

Review scores
Publication	Score
IGN	6/10
Nintendo Life	6/10
Nintendo World Report	8/10
Push Square	6/10

Innerspace received mixed to average reviews from critics.
