= The Sims 2: Castaway =

2007 video game

- Developers: EA Redwood Shores; Full Fat (NDS)
- Publisher: Electronic Arts
- Series: The Sims
- Platforms: Keypad-based mobile phones Nintendo DS; PlayStation 2 PlayStation Portable; Wii
- Release: October 23, 2007: NA: October 23, 2007; AU: October 23, 2007 (DS); AU: October 25, 2007 (PS2); EU: October 26, 2007 (DS, PS2, Wii); AU: October 30, 2007 (Wii); AU: November 1, 2007 (PSP); EU: November 2, 2007 (PSP); JP: January 24, 2008 (DS) Mobile 2008 Windows Mobile May 7, 2009 BlackBerry August 20, 2009
- Genres: Life simulation, survival
- Mode: Single-player

The Sims 2: Castaway is the third console spin-off of the life simulation video game The Sims 2 for the Wii, Nintendo DS (NDS), PlayStation 2 (PS2) and PlayStation Portable (PSP). It is also available on mobile phones; Nokia offered Castaway on the Ovi Store. A roughly similar game, The Sims Castaway Stories, is available for personal computers, but is not a direct port of Castaway.

== Story ==
The game begins on a boat after the player creates a crew of characters. The crew can consist of up to six Sims. After the crew's creation, a slide-show starts of some mobile phone pictures that are taken showing the trip and also showing the storm that wrecks the ship. The player's starting Sim wakes up on First Beach on Shipwreck Island. The Sim finds books detailing the tasks that have to be followed to survive on the islands and escape. Shortly after exploring Shipwreck Island, the Sim discovers a second island, Airplane Island, and builds a raft to reach the new location.

Upon arrival at Airplane Island, should there be more than one Sim created, the player has the opportunity to reunite the lost crew, culminating in the formation of a tribe of Sims once the relationship is strong enough. While exploring Airplane Island, the player can search for radio parts that are required to complete a goal later in the game and discover a secret passage. Eventually, the player discovers a third island, Volcano Island, and builds a canoe to reach the new location.

On Volcano Island, the player can explore the remains of the llama people or otherwise try to return to civilization. To do the latter, the player can either build a catamaran once on the last beach or travel to the volcano's summit and send an SOS signal using radio parts. Optionally, the player can repair a broken ceremonial forge of the llama people, causing a secret fourth island, Crystal Island, to rise out of the sea.

The game also contains many optional discoverable secrets, including secret areas such as Hidden Lagoon and the Secret Pirate's Cove. These areas can only be accessed once the player has gathered the necessary items via extensive exploration, such as hieroglyphics and treasure map pieces, besides meeting the skill point requirements.

== Reception ==
Reception

Aggregate score
Aggregator	Score				
Aggregator	DS	mobile	PS2	PSP	Wii
Metacritic	66/100	N/A	71/100	64/100	73/100

Review scores
Publication	Score				
Publication	DS	mobile	PS2	PSP	Wii
1Up.com	C+	N/A	C+	C+	N/A
Eurogamer	N/A	N/A	5/10	N/A	N/A
Famitsu	28/40	N/A	N/A	N/A	N/A
Game Informer	N/A	N/A	N/A	N/A	7.25/10
GameRevolution	N/A	N/A	N/A	N/A	D
GameSpot	N/A	N/A	7.5/10	N/A	8/10
GameSpy	N/A	N/A	4/5	N/A	4/5
GameZone	N/A	N/A	7/10	N/A	7.5/10
IGN	7/10	7/10	7.5/10	5.9/10	7.5/10
NGamer	70%	N/A	N/A	N/A	75%
Nintendo Life	4/10	N/A	N/A	N/A	7/10
Pocket Gamer	3/5	4/5	N/A	N/A	N/A
PlayStation: The Official Magazine	N/A	N/A	3/5	N/A	N/A

The game received "mixed or average reviews" on all platforms according to the review aggregation website Metacritic. IGN said of the PlayStation 2 and Wii versions, "Designed for everyone's inner Gilligan, The Sims 2: Castaway is an amusing, if somewhat flawed exploration of island life. While it gives an interesting twist on the standard shipwreck concept, the hampered nature of the guidebooks, strange placement of plans in menus and continual micromanagement does hamper some of the fun of the title. However, Sims fans will find this to be a good break from the traditional Sims formula, and one that will keep them entertained for a while." In Japan, where the DS version was ported for release under the name The Sims 2: Survival (ザ・シムズ2 サバイバル, Za Shimuzu 2 Sabaibaru) on January 24, 2008, Famitsu gave it a score of all four sevens for a total of 28 out of 40.
