= Paper Wars: Cannon Fodder =

2010 video game

- iOS app icon
- Developer(s): iFun4all
- Publisher(s): iFun4all
- Platform(s): PlayStation Portable, PlayStation 3, iOS, Wii, Nintendo Switch
- Release: PSP, PlayStation 3: DE: October 6, 2010; NA: February 22, 2011; iOS; March 22, 2011; Wii; December 8, 2011; Switch; March 1, 2018
- Genre(s): Tower defense
- Mode(s): Single-player

Paper Wars: Cannon Fodder is a tower defense video game developed and published by iFun4all for PlayStation Portable and PlayStation 3 in 2010–2011, for iOS and Wii in 2011, and for Nintendo Switch (under the name Paper Wars: Cannon Fodder Devastated) in 2018.

== Reception ==
Reception

Aggregate score
Aggregator	Score
Metacritic	(iOS) 70/100 (PSP) 63/100 (Wii) 60/100 (NS1) 46/100 (NS2) 40/100

Review scores
Publication	Score
IGN	(Wii) 7.5/10
MacLife	(iOS)
Nintendo Life	(Wii) (NS)
Nintendo World Report	(NS) 5/10
Official Nintendo Magazine	(Wii) 44%
Pocket Gamer	(iOS)

The iOS, PSP, and Wii versions received "mixed or average reviews", while the Switch version received "generally unfavorable reviews", according to the review aggregation website Metacritic.
