= Torn (2018 video game) =

- Developer: Aspyr Media
- Publisher: Aspyr Media
- Writers: Neill Glancy, Susan O'Connor
- Composer: Garry Schyman
- Engine: Unity
- Platforms: Windows (Steam), PlayStation VR, Oculus VR, HTC Vive
- Release: August 28, 2018
- Genre: Adventure game
- Mode: Single-player

Torn is a virtual reality, sci-fi, adventure game developed by Aspyr Media played from a first-person view.

== Reception ==
Reception

Aggregate score
Aggregator	Score
Metacritic	PC: 73/100; PS4: 65/100

=== Awards ===
Torn was nominated for "Immersive Reality Technical Achievement" at the 22nd Annual D.I.C.E. Awards; for "Direction in Virtual Reality" at the National Academy of Video Game Trade Reviewers Awards; for "Music of the Year", "Best Original Soundtrack Album", and "Best Music for an Indie Game" at the 2019 G.A.N.G. Awards; for "Best Music/Sound Design" at the 2019 Webby Awards; and for "2018 Video Game Score of the Year" at the ASCAP Composers' Choice Awards.
