= My Singing Monsters =

Video game franchise made by Big Blue Bubble

- Logo for the first My Singing Monsters game
- Genre: Music video game
- Developer: Big Blue Bubble
- Publisher: Enad Global 7
- Platforms: Android; iOS; PlayStation Vita; Fire OS; Microsoft Windows
- Original release: List: My Singing Monsters; Canada: August 22, 2012; WW: September 4, 2012; My Singing Monsters: Dawn of Fire; WW: September 23, 2015; My Singing Monsters: Composer; WW: April 25, 2018; My Singing Monsters: Playground; WW: November 9, 2021; My Singing Monsters: Thumpies; WW: March 6, 2024
- First release: My Singing Monsters; September 4, 2012; 14 years ago
- Latest release: My Singing Monsters: Thumpies; March 5, 2024

My Singing Monsters is a 2012 Canadian video game franchise developed by Big Blue Bubble. The first game of the series was published and released with the help of Canada Media Fund (CMF) on September 4, 2012, for Apple iOS. Ports of the game for other operating systems were later released, including versions for Android, Amazon Kindle Fire, Barnes & Noble Nook, Steam, and PlayStation Vita. Since its release, My Singing Monsters has grown into a multimedia franchise, with a prequel, several spin-off games, books, live events, series and a board game. On May 12, 2021, Big Blue Bubble announced that the series would be releasing its first console title, My Singing Monsters: Playground, on November 9, 2021.

== My Singing Monsters ==
A gameplay of My Singing Monsters, featuring a variety of monsters with different musical roles (Pre-2.0.0 graphics).

In My Singing Monsters, players collect and breed many different types of anthropomorphic Monsters, each of which has a unique musical line that is either sung or played on an instrument. Several Monsters sing in nonsensical gibberish such as the Mammott (bum), Fwog (wow), and Toe Jammer (doo). Some sing fractured or short lines in English (such as the PomPom (hey and come on let's go), Shugabush (yeah), and Hoola (yippity yay), and others play real-world or fictional instruments (such as the Quibble (piano), Bowgart (cello), Shellbeat (drums), Strombonin (trombone), Zynth (analog synthesizer), and Incisaur (vibraslap). There are also special Monsters known as "Werdos" that sing actual lyrics (the Parlsona, Tawkerr, Stoowarb, Maggpi, Charrkoll, and AnomaLee), as well as the Ethereal Quint, BeMeebEth, Brump, and for the most part bbli$zard and T-Pirainha.

Most Monsters have "Rare" and "Epic" variants, both only available during specific timeframes. Rare Monsters can be bought either from the Starshop with Starpower or the "Monsters" section of the Market with Diamonds, or they can be bred with the same breeding combination as the Commons, and Epics have unique breeding combinations and are more difficult to obtain. Besides the variants of the Wubbox, all Rare and Epic monsters have the same sound and design as their Common counterpart. As of Version 4.4.0, Mirror Islands do not use the same song as their normal island, such as Mirror Psychic Island having a different song as Psychic Island. As of Version 4.7.0, a series of hand-shaped islands called The Ethereal Islets allows the player to "sacrifice" a monster into a structure known as the Dish Harmonizer, which can produce two monsters, usually doubles, when Dish-Harmonization is complete.

=== Monster Choir ===
Monster Choir, the English-translated name for the Chinese (怪兽合唱团) and Korean (몬스터 합창단) versions of My Singing Monsters, were special versions of the game licensed to Yodo1 Games only for use in China and South Korea respectively. Monster Choir shared many similarities with the main game, but also featured many differences, such as new Monster variants, a new minigame, and a VIP system. The Korean version used a completely unique UI skin, while the Chinese version used a similar UI as the main game before Version 2.0.0. Both versions had all features of the main game up to Version 1.3.2.

Monster Choir was supported independently from Big Blue Bubble, and thus these versions were not listed on its website and were almost never mentioned by the developers. Monster Choir Korea had a Facebook page where updates were given. Its last post was posted in September 2015, and it was shut down in early 2023. It also has a YouTube channel that posted three trailers.

The game servers themselves had shut down sometime in late 2020. Although downloaded applications (or "apks") can still be found on the internet, they can no longer connect to game servers, rendering it unplayable.

== My Singing Monsters: Dawn of Fire ==
My Singing Monsters: Dawn of Fire is a prequel of the original My Singing Monsters, set in a time when the element of Fire was born. Unlike the original game which introduced the Fire Monsters to players, the main song is on "the Continent", a supercontinent land that was formed similarly to Pangaea. The Monsters are depicted as babies on "the Continent", and the starter Monsters are Noggin and Kayna. There are five sections of the Continent, unlocked at different player levels and are based on the Natural Islands from the original game. Monsters in their young form are initially raised on the Continent, each of which plays a unique tune that contributes to the musical theme. Each Monster requests a unique set of "Crafting Items" that can be used to increase their level up to 20; filling these requests will reward in-game currency plus additional benefits that can unlock additional features of the game. At a certain level unique to each Monster, the young Monsters are able to permanently teleport to additional "Outer Islands" as adult Monsters, gaining new musical lines on an Island with a unique group of Monsters that produce an entirely different song. These include Party Island, Space Island, Cloud Island, and Cave Island. There is also one other Island, called Starhenge, featuring Celestial Monsters. On September 23, 2025, 10 years after the worldwide release of Dawn of Fire, Wanderer Island released, being the first island in almost 9 years to be added in the game. It contains the special Monsters on The Continent which are the Mythical and Seasonal Monsters.

Like the main game, Dawn of Fire has seasonal events and Seasonal Monsters which are only available for certain times of the year; these being Spooktacle Junior, Festival of Yay Junior, Season of Love Junior, Eggs-Travaganza Junior and SummerSong Junior. Mythicals are present in the game, but can only be bred for a limited time. Dawn of Fire also introduced Prismatics, which are only available during certain events, and can be created by sending a Monster through the Prism Gate. Prismatics serve as the prequel's equivalent of Rare and Epic Monsters from the original game.

== Other games ==
=== My Singing Monsters: Composer ===
My Singing Monsters: Composer serves as an app for composing custom songs using some, but not all, Monsters from the franchise. The player can edit the Monsters' sounds by placing their notes onto a grid, all while changing the key and tempo. This game also features Rare Instrumental Monsters, Dipsters,

=== My Singing Monsters: The Board Game ===
My Singing Monsters: The Board Game is a board game based on the My Singing Monsters franchise. The board game was supported by Kickstarter from June 1 to 21 2021 and was designed by Sen-Foong Lim and Jay Cormier. There are two versions of the game; the Standard Edition, which includes all of the core components, and the Deluxe Edition, which includes nine painted Monster mini-figures, upgraded components, and an exclusive expansion that features the Werdo Monsters. The board game is a worker placement game, in which the player breeds Monsters to produce more coins than other players, and more board pieces (taking the form of in-game islands) can be added to increase the length and strategy of the game.

=== Teaching Guide Grade 1-3: My Singing Monsters ===
In 2018, Big Blue Bubble released an educational guide aimed towards elementary school children; Teaching Guide Grade 1-3: My Singing Monsters, which is intended to teach lessons about music using characters and concepts from the franchise.

=== My Singing Monsters: Thumpies ===
My Singing Monsters: Thumpies is a 2024 remastered remake of the 2010 game Thumpies. The game is a rhythm game, requiring the player to tap various objects in time to the bouncing Thumpie characters on-screen, to fill the Thump-o-Meter and achieve three stars. The game had a hard launch on Android and iOS devices on March 5, 2024, costing $4.99.

=== My Singing Monsters Karaoke ===
My Singing Monsters Karaoke is a free-to-play rhythm game released in August 2026. It requires you to click and hold various notes to make the monster sing. The challenge of the game is to keep the monsters in key and features stylized and exaggerated art of the monsters. Some of the monsters included are Entbrat, Mammott and bbli$zard. It became available on Steam on August 19th, 2026.

=== Discontinued games ===
==== Furcorn's Jelly Dreams / Jammer Splash! ====
Furcorn's Jelly Dreams was a puzzle game featuring characters from the franchise, and was discontinued in 2017. This eventually was remade into Jammer Splash!, which featured Toe Jammer, and was also discontinued as well.

==== My Singing Monsters: Coloring Book ====
My Singing Monsters: Coloring Book was a digital coloring book by Big Blue Bubble themed around My Singing Monsters. The app was first released on December 15, 2016 on Android and iOS devices. It was discontinued on January 24, 2025.

==== Other discontinued games ====
Several other games from the franchise have also been discontinued, including My Mammott, My PomPom, Fling a Thing!, and My Singing Monsters: Official Guide.

== Notable collaborations ==
My Muppets Show features five stages which were the game's version of islands, each with their own songs, and Muppets were obtained by "digitizing" them with a machine called HARV-E. The game was discontinued and had its servers shut down on January 9, 2015.

In July 2013, Big Blue Bubble announced that they had collaborated with artist Kristian Bush from American country music duo Sugarland to create a new set of monsters, the Shugafam along with a new island called "Shugabush Island".

In October 2013, Big Blue Bubble signed a deal with publishing house Egmont UK as its new strategic licensing partner.

In July 2017, Big Blue Bubble announced that Wind Sun Sky Entertainment would adapt its mobile game My Singing Monsters into a multi-media franchise, beginning with an animated TV series and consumer products program. Skybound Entertainment would be the distributor in all territories worldwide, excluding Canada. While a series of figurines and plush toys were released in 2019, the series itself was cancelled shortly later, due to production struggles.

In December 2025, Big Blue Bubble collaborated with artist bbno$ to create the monster bbli$zard, who was added to Cold Island. In September 2026, similar to Shugabush, bbli$zard ended up getting its own set of monsters called the bb$quad alongside an island called "bbli$zard Island", featuring a remix of bbno$'s song Two.

In February 2026, version 5.3.0 was released, adding Autotuna, a monster designed after rapper T-Pain, as a guide to the newly added Clubbox feature. The monster was later revealed to be officially named T-Pirainha in version 5.4.0, receiving its own Clubbox act called "Waveform", alongside releasing on Water Island.

== Reception ==
Kotaku described the original My Singing Monsters as a "clever combination of music and monster breeding", praising how the complexity of a song can become developed by the utility of breeding monsters, each monster revealing a new line to the song. However, Kotaku was "a bit disappointed" with the level of complexity added in Dawn of Fire, reporting that the new feeding system hinders progress towards the whole concept of unveiling the "musical nirvana".

Gamezebo and 148Apps stated that they enjoyed the music in My Singing Monsters, but expressed dissatisfaction with the connection issues present at the game's release.

The game won the People's Voice Award for "Best Music/Sound Design" at the 2020 Webby Awards. 10 diamonds were rewarded to all players who logged in that week.
