= Layers of Fear =

2016 video game

- Developer: Bloober Team
- Publisher: Aspyr
- Designers: Michał Król; Paweł Niezabitowski
- Programmers: Eryk Dykiel; Mariusz Szaflik
- Artist: Mateusz Lenart
- Writer: Andrzej Mądrzak
- Composer: Arkadiusz Reikowski
- Engine: Unity
- Platforms: Linux; Microsoft Windows; macOS; PlayStation 4; Xbox One; Nintendo Switch
- Release: Linux, Windows, macOS, PlayStation 4, Xbox One; 16 February 2016; Nintendo Switch; 21 February 2018
- Genres: Adventure, Psychological horror
- Mode: Single-player

Layers of Fear is a 2016 psychological horror adventure game developed by Bloober Team and published by Aspyr. It was released on Linux, Microsoft Windows, macOS, PlayStation 4, and Xbox One worldwide in February 2016.

In Layers of Fear, the player controls a psychologically disturbed painter who is trying to complete his magnum opus as he navigates a Victorian mansion revealing secrets about his past. The gameplay, presented in first-person perspective, is story-driven and revolves around puzzle-solving and exploration. Layers of Fear: Inheritance was released on 2 August 2016 as a direct follow up add-on to the first game. This time the player controls the Painter's daughter with the downloadable content focusing on her apparent relapse into trauma after returning to her old house.

A definitive port for the Nintendo Switch, entitled Layers of Fear: Legacy, was released on 21 February 2018 and it features, in addition to the Inheritance DLC, Joy-Con, touchscreen, and HD Rumble support. A limited physical retail release for the Nintendo Switch and PlayStation 4, published by Limited Run Games in North America, would be available starting October 2018. A sequel titled Layers of Fear 2 was announced in October 2018 and was released on May 29, 2019. A remake of both games combined, also titled Layers of Fear, launched on June 15, 2023.

== Gameplay ==
The player takes control of an artist who has returned to his studio. His initial goal is to complete his masterpiece, and the player's role is to figure out how this task should be accomplished. The challenge comes from puzzles which require the player to search the environment for visual clues. The house appears straightforward at first, but it changes around the player as they explore it in first person. These changes in the environment provide scaffolding for the puzzles and provide regular jump scares common to games of this genre.

The game is divided into six chapters with various items for the player to find in order to complete his work. The game is heavily dimmed, and there are objects that uncover certain aspects of the Painter's history. While completing the painting, there is a letter that is slowly pieced together, which shows the origin of his masterpiece, and objects which explain the secret of the Painter through dialogue flashbacks.

== Plot ==
Set sometime after World War I in the UK, the unnamed protagonist, also known as the Painter, returns home to begin painting his "magnum opus". To accomplish this, he explores labyrinthine networks of corridors which defy spatial logic to acquire the necessary materials. During this process, details of his past are made clear to the player.

Once a promising young artist, the Painter found inspiration in his pianist wife, who served as both his model and his muse. However, a devastating department store fire left the Painter's wife severely injured, permanently impairing her ability to play the piano and altering her physical appearance. This tragic event triggered a decline in the Painter's mental health, affecting the quality of his work and resulting in several rejections from prominent galleries.

Over time, mutual resentment grew between the Painter and his wife. The Painter retreated into his studio, isolating himself for extended periods, meanwhile his wife, feeling neglected and repulsed by her husband's disgust, resorted to destroying his masterpiece: a portrait of herself entitled "The Lady in Black."

Eventually, overwhelmed by despair, the wife took her own life. In the years following her death, the Painter's mental state further deteriorated, culminating in the loss of custody of his daughter.

In the present, the Painter gathers the macabre components for his final work, implied to be various body parts taken from his wife: her skin as the canvas, her blood as the paint, her bone as the undercoat, a brush made from her hair, her finger for the "final touches", and her eye to "bear witness".

Depending on the player's actions in the game, three endings are possible:

- The "Loop" Ending: the Painter completes his magnum opus, a portrait of his wife, only to witness its transformation into a grotesque caricature. Unsatisfied, he discards it in a room filled with identical portraits. He returns to his studio, destined to repeat the cycle.
- The "Art" Ending: the Painter creates a self-portrait, achieving a sense of artistic fulfillment at last. The final scene depicts his work displayed alongside other renowned masterpieces in a museum.
- The "Family" Ending: the Painter's final work incorporates both his wife and daughter. Acknowledging his past mistakes, he realizes that "it won't bring them back." In a final act, he sets fire to his studio and all of his paintings, including his latest work, perishing in the flames.

=== Inheritance ===
The Inheritance DLC delves into the Painter's daughter's return to her now-dilapidated childhood home. Armed with a flashlight, she relives her traumatic upbringing, witnessing the full scope of her family's tragic past in the form of vivid and surreal memories. During the course of these relived memories, the daughter discovers her father's portrait of herself, left behind for her. Ultimately, there are different outcomes depending on the player's actions.

- The "Father" Ending: Interpreting it as an apology from her father, the daughter resolves to view him as an ultimately tragic figure. After she leaves, burning down her childhood home behind her, this portrait is later displayed in her own home. She is heard criticizing her child's artwork, while the portrait visibly distorts.
- The "Mother" Ending: Haunted by memories of her father's abuse, the daughter remains unsatisfied by the apology. She smashes the portrait, accidentally igniting a blaze that ultimately traps her within the burning house.
- The "True Inheritance" Ending: Using her childhood drawings, the daughter assembles a large self portrait. She recalls being told that insanity runs in her family, and decides to "let it run." Her father's once-decrepit studio is restored to its original state, ready for her to begin working on the same canvas he had used.

== Development ==
Layers of Fear was heavily inspired by P.T., a teaser game for the cancelled video game Silent Hills. The plot, in particular the ending with the blank canvas, closely parallels Anthony M. Rud's short story "A Square of Blank Canvas" from the April 1924 issue of Weird Tales. The game uses the Unity game engine.

In 2016, Aspyr Media and Daydream released an Android port called Layers of Fear: Solitude. An iOS version was released in 2019 but it was removed shortly afterward for reasons unknown. A remake of Layers of Fear and its sequel using Unreal Engine 5 was released in 2023, featuring additional and revised narrative content.

== Reception ==
Reception

Aggregate score
Aggregator	Score
Metacritic	PC: 72/100; PS4: 74/100; XONE: 78/100; NS: 80/100

Review scores
Publication	Score
Game Informer	5/10
GameSpot	7/10
GamesRadar+	5/5
IGN	5.8/10
The Escapist	5/5

Nick Monroe of The Escapist praised the game. "A magnum opus (...) A superb example of making story and atmosphere work together (...) Layers of Fear achieves its goal of making you scared as a player, instead of just existing as something scary". Matt Ferguson from Syfy Games praised the storytelling calling it "Perfection" and saying the game was, "an evocatively thrilling horror game: it strikes a fantastic balance between narrative, gameplay, atmospheric immersion." Patricia Hernandez of Kotaku said "Layers of Fear is one of the biggest horror surprises of the year." Danielle Riendeau and Dave Tach of Polygon said "Layers of Fear is like P.T. on drugs." Matt Thrower from GameSpot rated the game a 7/10, saying, "Stacked up like the rickety tiers of a Gothic building, Layers of Fear proves aptly named." Leon Hurley praised the game in a GamesRadar review, stating "it's one of the best horror games I've ever played and literally creates a new tool set for interactive scares." He complimented the game's art and the "unease from a horror experience" it provides, giving it a maximum score.

Choi Rad of IGN found the subject of the game interesting but declared the game "not scary", "lacking tension", and that "every time he started to enjoy the flow, it was broken by small puzzle challenges that just aren't fun to solve." Joe Juba of Game Informer echoed Rad's statements critiquing the game's telegraphed scares, noting that it felt like a haunted house at a carnival rather than P.T., declaring that "After a scary moment, it doesn't allow players enough breathing room, because the next one is always immediately around the corner. Every time you enter a room or a hallway, something happens."

== Sequels ==
In October 2018, developer Bloober Team announced a sequel to Layers of Fear, titled Layers of Fear 2, previously code-named Project Méliès. Layers of Fear 2 was published by Gun Media on May 28, 2019. In September 2021, Bloober Team revealed a trailer for a third Layers of Fear project. The game was originally set for release in 2022, but was delayed to 2023.
