= Big Blue Bubble =

Canadian gaming company

Big Blue Bubble, Inc.
- Type: Private
- Industry: Computer and Video Games
- Founded: 2004; 22 years ago
- Founder: Damir Slogar; Renata Slogar
- Headquarters: London, Ontario, Canada
- Key people: Claudette Critchley (CEO)
- Products: My Singing Monsters, My Singing Monsters: Dawn of Fire, Power Chord, Burn the Rope, Thumpies, "My Singing Monsters Karaoke", "My Singing Monsters Playground", "My Singing Monsters Composer"
- Number of employees: 75 (2024)
- Parent: Enad Global 7 (2020–present)
- Website: bigbluebubble.com

Big Blue Bubble, Inc. is a Canadian video game company headquartered in London, Ontario, founded in 2004 by industry veteran Damir Slogar, Renata Slogar, and Claudette Critchley. Big Blue Bubble has developed over a hundred games and gained international recognition with its game My Singing Monsters which has been downloaded over 100 million times. The company was acquired by Swedish company Enad Global 7 in 2020.

== History ==
=== Early years (2004–2012) ===
Big Blue Bubble was founded in 2004 by industry veteran Damir Slogar, along with co-founders Renata Slogar and Claudette Critchley. In the early days of its history, Big Blue Bubble made a name for itself by specializing in casual and mobile games. Its first game, Bubble Trouble, was used in marketing campaigns by Nokia and it was followed by the space thriller Captain Lunar, which was used as a launch title for the Sony Ericsson T610. Soon after, Big Blue Bubble began adapting film and television franchises, such as 24 for handheld devices. In the mid to late 2000s, the company started moving towards console development, to include the Wii and PlayStation 2 platforms.

=== Return to mobile (2010–2012) ===
In the early 2010s, Big Blue Bubble returned to its roots in mobile gaming and the 'freemium' business model. This return to mobile resulted in a shifting focus on original intellectual properties such as Burn the Rope, Thumpies, and most notably My Singing Monsters.

=== Post-My Singing Monsters (2012–present) ===
Released on September 4, 2012, for Apple iOS, My Singing Monsters was both a critical and commercial success soon after its release, with Kotaku describing the game as a "clever combination of music and monster breeding", praising how the complexity of a song can become developed by the utility of breeding Monsters, each monster revealing a new line to the song. Through continued support, the game has grown into a multimedia franchise, with a prequel, several spin-off games, books, live events, series, and a board game.

After years in the mobile game space, Big Blue Bubble made the decision to return to console games with the development of the action-platformer, Foregone, a retro-pixel side-scrolling adventure that released on the Epic Games Store February 27, 2020, and Nintendo Switch, Xbox One, and PlayStation 4 on October 13, 2020. On May 12, 2021, Big Blue Bubble announced that the My Singing Monsters series would be releasing its first console title, called My Singing Monsters: Playground. The game was subsequently released on November 9, 2021.

On August 26, 2020, Swedish company Enad Global 7 acquired Big Blue Bubble for $16M CAD.

On January 26, 2023, Big Blue Bubble released a music-based roguelike deck-building game, Power Chord.

On November 24, 2023, Big Blue Bubble was named one of Canada's Most Admired Corporate Cultures.
