= Aspyr =

American video game developer and publisher

Aspyr Media, Inc.
- Logo since 2019
- Type: Subsidiary
- Industry: Video games
- Founded: September 27, 1996; 30 years ago
- Founders: Michael Rogers; Ted Staloch
- Headquarters: Austin, Texas, US
- Key people: Michael Rogers (co-CEO); Ted Staloch (co-CEO)
- Products: List of games ported by Aspyr
- Parent: Saber Interactive (2021–2024); Embracer Group (2024–present)
- Subsidiaries: Beamdog
- Website: aspyr.com

Aspyr Media, Inc. (pronounced "aspire") is an American video game developer and publisher founded by Michael Rogers and Ted Staloch in Austin, Texas. Originally founded to port gaming titles to macOS, the company, since 2005, has become a publisher and developer of entertainment for multiple gaming platforms.

Aspyr was acquired by Embracer Group in February 2021. Initially placed within Embracer's Saber Interactive division, Aspyr later became a direct subsidiary of Embracer after Saber was divested in March 2024.

== History ==
In 1996, Aspyr Media, Inc., was established by Michael Rogers and Ted Staloch in Austin, Texas. Staloch, who had a background in sales and marketing and Rogers, who worked with TechWorks, noticed that there was a lack of gaming titles available to Mac owners and set out to change it. According to Rogers, when naming the company, they "wanted something meaning 'to aspire and be great'" and also "memorable and unique". Aspyr made its name specializing in porting video games from Microsoft Windows to macOS.

In December 2001, Inside Mac Games' Tuncer Deniz stated Aspyr made a "decent profit" by publishing Mac games licensed by publishers like Activision. By 2003, they owned 60 percent of the Mac entertainment market. In 2005, Aspyr partnered with Alex Seropian of Wideload Games and released their first originally-published AAA game, Stubbs The Zombie, to Mac OS, Windows and Xbox. In 2014 they started porting titles to Linux, releasing titles such as Civilization V and Civilization VI as well as Borderlands: The Pre-Sequel and Borderlands 2. They dropped support for the Linux version of Borderlands 2 in September 2020 and have not released subsequent Linux ports. They also published Layers of Fear, Observer and InnerSpace for that platform by other developers.

In 2015, Aspyr Media expanded their platform catalog again by releasing an iOS port of Star Wars: Knights of the Old Republic and, later, BioWare's classic-action RPG Jade Empire – a title they extended to Android as well. In 2015, Aspyr updated Star Wars Knights of the Old Republic II: The Sith Lords (native widescreen resolutions up to 5K, Steam Workshop, support for controllers, 57 achievements, etc.) and also ported it to macOS and Linux. In 2015, Aspyr developed and published Fahrenheit: Indigo Prophecy Remastered, a remaster of the 2005 game developed by Quantic Dream, to a worldwide audience with enhanced game features, updated visuals and controls, as well as content that was censored in the original North American release.

Aspyr has published over 190 games and have added 90 plus members to their team since 1996. In February 2021, Aspyr was acquired by Embracer Group. The company was added as a studio under the Saber Interactive label within Embracer. In September 2021, it was announced that Aspyr was developing a remake of Knights of the Old Republic for Microsoft Windows and PlayStation 5 as a timed exclusive. In August 2022, Embracer announced that Aspyr is no longer working on the game and development has been moved to another studio.

Aspyr published MythForce, the first game designed by Canadian studio Beamdog. The day after they announced this, on April 13, 2022, Embracer Group acquired Beamdog and placed it as a subsidiary of Aspyr.

In 2024, Aspyr developed and published—alongside sister company Crystal Dynamics—a remastered collection of the original three Tomb Raider games developed by Core Design, titled Tomb Raider I–III Remastered. It was released on February 14, on Valentine's Day, to coincide with main protagonist Lara Croft's canonical birthday. The same year, Aspyr released ports of the first two original Star Wars: Battlefront games under Star Wars: Battlefront Classic Collection on March 14, 2024.

In March 2024, Embracer sold Saber Interactive to Beacon Interactive, alongside several other studios. Aspyr was not included in the deal and remains under Embracer.

== Games ==
Currently, Aspyr's catalog includes popular games such as Sid Meier's Civilization VI, developed in 2018 on Mac, Linux, iOS and Nintendo Switch, Torn, the re-releases of several Lucasfilm Games (LucasArts) titles, and Tomb Raider I–III Remastered.
