= Lists of corporate mergers and acquisitions =

Corporate ownership chart

Lists of corporate mergers and acquisitions include both takeovers and mergers of corporations. Most are organized by the main company involved in the transactions.

== By size ==
- List of largest mergers and acquisitions

== By industry ==
- List of airline mergers and acquisitions
- List of bank mergers in the United States
- List of largest media and entertainment mergers and acquisitions
- List of largest pharmaceutical mergers and acquisitions
- List of largest video game mergers and acquisitions
- List of mergers and acquisitions in online gambling
- List of mergers of securities firms

== Company specific ==
=== List of acquisitions by company ===
- List of acquisitions by Adobe
- List of acquisitions by American Bridge Company
- List of acquisitions by AOL
- List of acquisitions by CA Technologies
- List of acquisitions by Cisco Systems
- List of acquisitions by Dell
- List of acquisitions by Disney
- List of acquisitions by eBay
- List of acquisitions by Electronic Arts
- List of acquisitions by Hewlett-Packard
- List of acquisitions by Juniper Networks
- List of acquisitions by Nokia
- List of acquisitions by Oracle
- List of acquisitions by Sony
- List of acquisitions by Take-Two Interactive
- List of acquisitions by THQ Nordic

=== List of mergers and acquisitions by company ===
- List of mergers and acquisitions by Advania
- List of mergers and acquisitions by Alphabet
- List of mergers and acquisitions by Amazon
- List of mergers and acquisitions by Apple
- List of mergers and acquisitions by BlackBerry
- List of mergers and acquisitions by Citrix
- List of mergers and acquisitions by Dell
- List of mergers and acquisitions by Embracer Group
- List of mergers and acquisitions by Gen Digital
- List of mergers and acquisitions by IBM
- List of mergers and acquisitions by Meta Platforms
- List of mergers and acquisitions by Microsoft
- List of mergers and acquisitions by SAP
- List of mergers and acquisitions by Salesforce
- List of mergers and acquisitions by Symantec
- List of mergers and acquisitions by Twitter
- List of mergers and acquisitions by Yahoo!

=== Other ===
- List of companies consolidated into American Bridge Company
