= List of largest media and entertainment mergers and acquisitions =

List of largest media and entertainment mergers and acquisitions is a list of the largest publicly announced mergers, acquisitions, and other major corporate transactions involving companies in the media and entertainment industries, with a transaction value of at least US$1 billion. The list covers film and television studios, television networks, streaming services, video game companies, music companies, and publishing companies. Transactions are ranked by their announced deal value at the time the agreement was first made public, rather than by their eventual cost, inflation-adjusted value, or later changes in market value.

The largest transaction on the list is the AOL–Time Warner merger, announced in 2000 at $163.4 billion. It combined AOL's internet business with Time Warner's extensive media and entertainment assets, including Warner Bros., HBO, CNN, and other properties. The second-largest transaction is Paramount Skydance's acquisition of Warner Bros. Discovery, announced in 2025 for $110.9 billion, while the third-largest is AT&T's acquisition of Time Warner, announced in 2016 for $85.4 billion.

Large-scale consolidation in the entertainment industry accelerated during the late 20th and early 21st centuries as companies sought to combine content production, distribution, and consumer platforms. Major examples include Disney's acquisitions of Capital Cities/ABC and 21st Century Fox, Comcast's acquisition of NBCUniversal, and the creation of Warner Bros. Discovery. In the 2020s, consolidation expanded further into streaming and video games, with transactions such as Microsoft's acquisition of Activision Blizzard and other large gaming deals.

== List ==
Acquirer(s)	Target	Year	Deal value (US$)	Inflation adjusted (US$)	Ref(s).
(United States) America Online	(United States) Time Warner	2001	163,400,000,000	2.97105×10^{11}	
(United States) Paramount Skydance	(United States) Warner Bros. Discovery	2026	110,900,000,000	1.10900×10^{11}	
(United States) AT&T	(United States) Time Warner	2018	108,700,000,000	1.39368×10^{11}	
(United States) Charter Communications	(United States) Time Warner Cable	2016	78,700,000,000	1.06896×10^{11}	
(United States) Microsoft	(United States) Activision Blizzard	2023	75,400,000,000	7.9674×10^{10}	
(United States) The Walt Disney Company	(United States) 21st Century Fox	2019	71,300,000,000	8.9786×10^{10}	
(Saudi Arabia) PIF (and others)	(United States) Electronic Arts	2026	55,000,000,000	5.5000×10^{10}	
(United States) AT&T	(United States) DirecTV	2015	49,000,000,000	6.6556×10^{10}	
(United States) Discovery, Inc.	(United States) WarnerMedia	2022	43,000,000,000	4.7308×10^{10}	
(United States) Comcast	(United Kingdom) Sky	2018	39,000,000,000	5.0003×10^{10}	
(United Kingdom) Virgin Media	(United Kingdom) O2	2021	38,000,000,000	4.5149×10^{10}	
(United States) Viacom	(United States) CBS Corporation	2000	35,000,000,000	6.5435×10^{10}	
(France) Vivendi	(Canada) (United States) Seagram/Universal	2000	34,000,000,000	6.3565×10^{10}	
(United States) The Walt Disney Company	(United States) NFL Network and NFL RedZone	2026	30,000,000,000	3.0000×10^{10}	
(United States) Liberty Global	(United Kingdom) Virgin Media	2013	23,300,000,000	3.2204×10^{10}	
(United States) Fox Corporation	(United States) Roku	2026	22,000,000,000	2.2000×10^{10}	
(United States) Charter Communications	(United States) Cox Communications	2026	21,900,000,000	2.1900×10^{10}	
(Canada) Rogers Communications	(Canada) Shaw Communications	2021	20,800,000,000	2.4713×10^{10}	
(United States) The Walt Disney Company	(United States) Capital Cities/ABC	1996	19,000,000,000	3.9004×10^{10}	
(United States) Activision	(United States) Vivendi Games	2008	18,900,000,000	2.8262×10^{10}	
(United States) CBS Corporation	(United States) Viacom	2019	15,400,000,000	1.9393×10^{10}	
(United States) Time Inc.	(United States) Warner Communications	1990	14,900,000,000	3.6719×10^{10}	
(United States) Discovery, Inc.	(United States) Scripps Networks Interactive	2018	14,600,000,000	1.8719×10^{10}	
(United States) National Broadcasting Company, Inc.	(United States) Vivendi Universal Entertainment	2004	14,000,000,000	2.3864×10^{10}	
(United States) Comcast	(United States) NBC Universal	2011	13,750,000,000	1.9679×10^{10}	
(United States) Take-Two Interactive	(United States) Zynga	2022	12,700,000,000	1.3972×10^{10}	
(France) Vivendi	(France) Canal+	2000	11,400,000,000	2.1313×10^{10}	
(United States) Seagram	(United States) PolyGram	1998	10,600,000,000	2.0938×10^{10}	
(United States) Sinclair Broadcast Group	(United States) Fox Sports Networks	2019	10,600,000,000	1.3348×10^{10}	
(France) Vivendi Universal	(United States) USA Networks	2002	10,300,000,000	1.8437×10^{10}	
(United States) Viacom	(United States) Paramount Communications	1994	9,750,000,000	2.1179×10^{10}	
(United Kingdom) BSkyB	(Germany) Sky Europe	2014	9,000,000,000	1.2240×10^{10}	
(United States) The Walt Disney Company	(United States) Hulu (Comcast's 33% stake)	2023	8,610,000,000	9.098×10^{9}	
(China) Tencent	(Finland) Supercell (81.4% stake)	2016	8,600,000,000	1.1537×10^{10}	
(United States) Amazon	(United States) MGM Holdings	2022	8,450,000,000	9.297×10^{9}	
(United States) Viacom	(United States) Blockbuster/Spelling Entertainment Inc.	1994	8,400,000,000	1.8247×10^{10}	
(United States) Microsoft	(United States) ZeniMax Media	2021	8,100,000,000	9.624×10^{9}	
(United States) Skydance Media	(United States) Paramount Global	2025	8,000,000,000	8.000×10^{9}	
(France) Banijay Entertainment	(United Kingdom) All3Media	2026	8,000,000,000	8.000×10^{9}	
(United States) TPG Inc.	(United States) DirecTV (AT&T's 30% stake)	2021	7,800,000,000	9.267×10^{9}	
(United States) TPG Inc.	(United States) DirecTV (AT&T's 70% stake)	2025	7,600,000,000	7.600×10^{9}	
(United States) Time Warner	(United States) Turner Broadcasting System	1996	7,400,000,000	1.5191×10^{10}	
(United States) The Walt Disney Company	(United States) Pixar	2006	7,400,000,000	1.1818×10^{10}	
(Japan) Matsushita	(United States) MCA Inc.	1990	6,590,000,000	1.6240×10^{10}	
(United States) Nexstar Media Group	(United States) Tribune Media	2019	6,400,000,000	8.059×10^{9}	
(United States) General Electric	(United States) NBC	1986	6,280,000,000	1.8445×10^{10}	
(United States) Nexstar Media Group	(United States) Tegna	2026	6,200,000,000	6.200×10^{9}	
(Saudi Arabia) Savvy Games Group	(China) Moonton	2026	6,000,000,000	6.000×10^{9}	
(United States) Activision Blizzard	(Sweden) King	2016	5,900,000,000	7.915×10^{9}	
(Canada) Seagram	(United States) MCA/Universal	1995	5,900,000,000	1.2466×10^{10}	
(United States) General Electric	(United States) NBC Universal (Vivendi's 20% stake)	2011	5,800,000,000	8.301×10^{9}	
(United States) News Corporation	(United States) Dow Jones	2007	5,600,000,000	8.695×10^{9}	
(United States) Westinghouse	(United States) CBS	1995	5,400,000,000	1.1410×10^{10}	
(United States) Versant	(United States) Free TV Networks	2026	5,000,000,000	5.000×10^{9}	
(Saudi Arabia) Savvy Games Group	(United States) Scopely	2023	4,900,000,000	5.178×10^{9}	
(Japan) Sony (and others)	(United States) MGM Holdings	2005	4,800,000,000	7.913×10^{9}	
(United States) Nexstar Media Group	(United States) Media General	2016	4,600,000,000	6.171×10^{9}	
(United States) Platinum Equity	(United States) McGraw Hill	2021	4,500,000,000	5.347×10^{9}	
(United States) The Walt Disney Company	(United States) Marvel Entertainment	2009	4,400,000,000	6.603×10^{9}	
(United States) HSN Inc.	(United States) Universal Studios (TV assets)	1998	4,100,000,000	8.099×10^{9}	
(United States) The Walt Disney Company	(United States) Lucasfilm	2012	4,050,000,000	5.680×10^{9}	
(China) ByteDance	(China) Moonton	2021	4,000,000,000	4.753×10^{9}	
(United States) Hasbro	(Canada) Entertainment One	2019	4,000,000,000	5.037×10^{9}	
(United States) NBCUniversal	(United States) DreamWorks Animation	2016	3,800,000,000	5.098×10^{9}	
(Japan) Sony	(United States) Bungie	2022	3,700,000,000	4.071×10^{9}	
(United States) News Corporation	(United States) Metromedia	1985	3,500,000,000	1.0477×10^{10}	
(United States) Capital Cities Communications	(United States) ABC	1986	3,500,000,000	1.0280×10^{10}	
(Saudi Arabia) Savvy Games Group	(United States) Niantic Games	2025	3,500,000,000	3.500×10^{9}	
(China) Wanda Group	(United States) Legendary Entertainment	2016	3,500,000,000	4.695×10^{9}	
(Japan) Sony	(United States) Columbia Pictures	1989	3,400,000,000	8.831×10^{9}	
(China) Tencent	(United States) Universal Music Group (Vivendi's 10% stake)	2020	3,370,000,000	4.192×10^{9}	
(United States) Access Industries	(United States) Warner Music Group	2011	3,300,000,000	4.105×10^{9}	
(United States) The Walt Disney Company	(United States) Fox Family Worldwide	2001	2,900,000,000	5.273×10^{9}	
(United States) Pershing Square Capital Management	(United States) (Netherlands) Universal Music Group (Vivendi's 7.1% stake)	2021	2,800,000,000	3.327×10^{9}	
(France) Vivendi	(France) Pathé	1999	2,590,000,000	5.006×10^{9}	
(United States) Microsoft	(Sweden) Mojang	2014	2,500,000,000	3.400×10^{9}	
(France) Canal+	(South Africa) MultiChoice	2025	2,500,000,000	2.500×10^{9}	
(United States) Live Nation	(United States) Ticketmaster	2010	2,500,000,000	3.691×10^{9}	
(United States) CBS Corporation	(United States) King World	1999	2,500,000,000	4.832×10^{9}	
(United States) News Corporation	(United States) New World Communications	1997	2,480,000,000	4.974×10^{9}	
(United States) Electronic Arts	(United States) Glu Mobile	2021	2,400,000,000	2.852×10^{9}	
(Sweden) EQT	(Republic of Ireland) Keywords Studios (51% stake)	2024	2,390,000,000	2.453×10^{9}	
(United States) Viacom	(United States) BET	2001	2,300,000,000	4.182×10^{9}	
(Japan) Sony	(United Kingdom) EMI Music Publishing	2011	2,200,000,000	3.149×10^{9}	
(France) Vivendi Universal	(United States) Houghton Mifflin Harcourt	2001	2,200,000,000	4.000×10^{9}	
(France) Banijay Group	(Netherlands) Endemol Shine Group	2020	2,200,000,000	2.737×10^{9}	
(Netherlands) Endemol	(United Kingdom) Shine Group	2014	2,200,000,000	2.992×10^{9}	
(United Kingdom) DAZN	(Australia) Foxtel	2025	2,140,000,000	2.140×10^{9}	
(United Kingdom) Sky	(United Kingdom) ITV (Media & Entertainment)	2026	2,100,000,000	2.100×10^{9}	
(Japan) Sony	(United States) CBS Records Group	1988	2,000,000,000	5.445×10^{9}	
(United States) Facebook	(United States) Oculus VR	2014	2,000,000,000	2.720×10^{9}	
(Canada) Corus Entertainment	(Canada) Shaw Media	2016	2,000,000,000	2.683×10^{9}	
(China) Trustar Capital	(China) Lingxi Games	2026	2,000,000,000	2.000×10^{9}	
(Israel) Playtika	(Israel) SuperPlay	2024	1,950,000,000	2.001×10^{9}	
(United States) Universal Music Group	(United Kingdom) EMI Recorded Music	2011	1,900,000,000	2.719×10^{9}	
(United States) Zynga	(Turkey) Peak	2020	1,800,000,000	2.239×10^{9}	
(Japan) Bandai	(Japan) Namco	2005	1,700,000,000	2.802×10^{9}	
(United States) News Corporation	(United States) International Family Entertainment	1997	1,700,000,000	3.410×10^{9}	
(United States) Google	(United States) YouTube	2006	1,650,000,000	2.635×10^{9}	
(United States) KKR	(United States) Simon & Schuster	2023	1,620,000,000	1.712×10^{9}	
(United States) Viacom	(United States) DreamWorks Pictures	2006	1,600,000,000	2.555×10^{9}	
(United States) Random House	(United Kingdom) Penguin Books	2013	1,600,000,000	2.211×10^{9}	
(United States) The Walt Disney Company	(United States) BAMTech Media (42% stake)	2017	1,580,000,000	2.075×10^{9}	
(United States) The Walt Disney Company	(United States) Epic Games (9% stake)	2024	1,500,000,000	1.539×10^{9}	
(United States) Turner Broadcasting System	(United States) MGM/UA Entertainment Co.	1986	1,500,000,000	4.406×10^{9}	
(United States) Westinghouse	(United States) CMT and The Nashville Network	1997	1,500,000,000	3.008×10^{9}	
(China) Tencent	(Hong Kong) Leyou	2020	1,500,000,000	1.866×10^{9}	
(United States) RedBird IMI	(United Kingdom) All3Media	2024	1,450,000,000	1.488×10^{9}	
(United States) Hulu	(United States) Hulu (AT&T's 9.5% stake)	2019	1,430,000,000	1.801×10^{9}	
(United States) Electronic Arts	(United Kingdom) Playdemic	2021	1,400,000,000	1.663×10^{9}	
(China) Tencent	(France) Vantage Studios (26.3% stake)	2025	1,300,000,000	1.300×10^{9}	
(United States) Tracinda	(United States) Metro-Goldwyn-Mayer	1997	1,300,000,000	2.607×10^{9}	
(United States) National Broadcasting Company, Inc.	(United States) Telemundo	2002	1,270,000,000	2.273×10^{9}	
(China) Tencent	(United Kingdom) Sumo Group	2021	1,270,000,000	1.509×10^{9}	
(United States) National Broadcasting Company, Inc.	(United States) Bravo	2002	1,250,000,000	2.238×10^{9}	
(United States) Electronic Arts	(United Kingdom) Codemasters	2020	1,200,000,000	1.493×10^{9}	
(China) Tencent	(Cyprus) Easybrain	2025	1,200,000,000	1.200×10^{9}	
(Japan) Sony	(United States) Sony BMG (Bertelsmann's 50% stake)	2008	1,200,000,000	1.794×10^{9}	
(United States) Warner Communications	(United States) Lorimar-Telepictures	1989	1,200,000,000	3.117×10^{9}	
(United States) Hearst Communications	(United States) A+E Global Media (The Walt Disney Company's 50% stake)	2026	1,200,000,000	1.200×10^{9}	
(Japan) Sony	(United States) Crunchyroll	2021	1,175,000,000	1.396×10^{9}	
(United States) Pershing Square Capital Management	(United States) (Netherlands) Universal Music Group (Vivendi's 2.9% stake)	2021	1,149,000,000	1.365×10^{9}	
(France) Canal+	(Luxembourg) M7 Group	2019	1,100,000,000	1.385×10^{9}	
(Germany) Bertelsmann	(United Kingdom) (United States) Penguin Random House (Pearson's 22% stake)	2017	1,000,000,000	1.313×10^{9}	
(United States) AT&T	(United States) Otter Media (The Chernin Group's 50% stake)	2018	1,000,000,000	1.282×10^{9}	
(United States) Scopely	(United States) GSN Games	2021	1,000,000,000	1.188×10^{9}	

== Failed/abandoned deals ==
Acquirer(s)	Target	Year	Deal value (US$ millions)	Inflation adjusted (US$ millions)	Ref(s).
(United States) Netflix	(United States) Warner Bros. Discovery (Streaming & Studios)	2026	82,700,000,000	8.2700×10^{10}	
(United States) Comcast	(United States) Warner Bros. Discovery (Streaming & Studios)	2025	81,000,000,000	8.1000×10^{10}	
(United States) 21st Century Fox	(United States) Time Warner	2014	80,000,000,000	1.08800×10^{11}	
(United States) Comcast	(United States) 21st Century Fox	2018	65,000,000,000	8.3339×10^{10}	
(United States) Pershing Square	(United States) (Netherlands) Universal Music Group	2026	64,000,000,000	6.4000×10^{10}	
(United States) Comcast	(United States) The Walt Disney Company	2004	54,000,000,000	9.2045×10^{10}	
(United States) Comcast	(United States) Time Warner Cable	2014	45,200,000,000	6.1472×10^{10}	
(United States) 21st Century Fox	(United Kingdom) Sky	2018	37,000,000,000	4.7439×10^{10}	
(Japan) Sony & (United States) Apollo	(United States) Paramount Global	2024	26,000,000,000	2.6684×10^{10}	
(United States) Starz Entertainment	(United States) Warner Bros. Discovery (Linear Networks)	2025	25,000,000,000	2.5000×10^{10}	
(United States) Fox Corporation	(United States) News Corp	2022	24,000,000,000	2.6404×10^{10}	
(United States) Allen Media Group	(United States) Paramount Global	2024	14,000,000,000	1.4368×10^{10}	
Sony Pictures Networks India	(India) Zee Entertainment	2024	10,000,000,000	1.0263×10^{10}	
(United States) DirecTV	(United States) Dish Network	2024	9,750,000,000	1.0006×10^{10}	
(Japan) SoftBank Group	(United States) Universal Music Group	2013	8,500,000,000	1.1748×10^{10}	
(France) Vivendi	(France) Ubisoft	2016	6,400,000,000	8.586×10^{9}	
(United States) Edgar Bronfman Jr.	(United States) Paramount Global	2024	4,600,000,000	4.721×10^{9}	
(United States) Warner Music Group	(United Kingdom) EMI	2006	4,000,000,000	6.388×10^{9}	
(United States) Sinclair Broadcast Group	(United States) Tribune Media	2017	3,900,000,000	5.123×10^{9}	
(United States) Allen Media Group	(United States) BET Media Group	2023	3,500,000,000	3.698×10^{9}	
(United States) Turner Broadcasting System	(United States) CBS	1986	3,000,000,000	8.811×10^{9}	
(United Kingdom) (United States) Penguin Random House	(United States) Simon & Schuster	2022	2,275,000,000	2.503×10^{9}	
(United States) Electronic Arts	(United States) Take-Two Interactive	2008	1,900,000,000	2.841×10^{9}	
(United States) Steinberg Group	(United States) The Walt Disney Company (49% stake)	1984	1,400,000,000	4.339×10^{9}	
(United States) News Corporation	(United States) Metro-Goldwyn-Mayer	1989	1,350,000,000	3.506×10^{9}	
(United States) Time Warner	(United Kingdom) EMI	2000	1,300,000,000	2.430×10^{9}	
(United Kingdom) ITV	(Canada) Entertainment One	2016	1,300,000,000	2.430×10^{9}	
(United States) Take-Two Interactive	(United States) Vivendi Universal Games	2003	1,000,000,000	1.750×10^{9}	

== See also ==
- List of largest video game mergers and acquisitions
