= List of largest video game mergers and acquisitions =

The video game industry has been subject to several mergers and acquisitions, such as Microsoft's acquisition of Activision Blizzard, which is the most expensive video game industry acquisition of all time, followed by the Activision-Vivendi Games merger and Take-Two Interactive's acquisition of Zynga. 14 of the 20 most expensive video game purchases in video game history occurred just between 2020 and 2023.

== At least US$1 billion ==
Acquirer(s)	Target	Year	Deal value (US$)	Inflation adjusted (US$)	Type	Ref.
(United States) Microsoft	(United States) Activision Blizzard	2023	75,400,000,000	7.9674×10^{10}	Acquisition	
(Saudi Arabia) Public Investment Fund (United States) Silver Lake (United States) Affinity Partners	(United States) Electronic Arts	2026	55,000,000,000	5.6447×10^{10}	Leveraged buyout	
(United States) Activision	(United States) (France) Vivendi Games	2008	18,900,000,000	2.8262×10^{10}	Merger	
(United States) Take-Two Interactive	(United States) Zynga	2022	12,700,000,000	1.3972×10^{10}	Acquisition	
(China) Tencent	(Finland) Supercell (81.4%)	2016	8,600,000,000	1.1537×10^{10}	Shares acquisition	
(United States) Microsoft	(United States) ZeniMax Media	2021	8,100,000,000	9.624×10^{9}	Acquisition	
(Saudi Arabia) Savvy Games Group	(China) Moonton	2026	6,000,000,000	6.000×10^{9}	Acquisition	
(United States) Activision Blizzard	(Sweden) King	2016	5,900,000,000	8.014×10^{9}	Acquisition	
(Saudi Arabia) Savvy Games Group	(United States) Scopely	2023	4,900,000,000	5.178×10^{9}	Acquisition	
(China) ByteDance	(China) Moonton	2021	4,000,000,000	4.753×10^{9}	Acquisition	
(Japan) (United States) Sony Interactive Entertainment	(United States) Bungie	2022	3,700,000,000	4.071×10^{9}	Acquisition	
(Saudi Arabia) Savvy Games Group	(United States) Niantic Games	2025	3,500,000,000	3.500×10^{9}	Acquisition	
(United States) Microsoft	(Sweden) Mojang	2014	2,500,000,000	3.400×10^{9}	Acquisition	
(Sweden) EQT	(Republic of Ireland) Keywords Studios (51%)	2024	2,390,000,000	2.453×10^{9}	Shares acquisition	
(United States) Electronic Arts	(United States) Glu Mobile	2021	2,400,000,000	2.852×10^{9}	Acquisition	
(United States) Facebook	(United States) Oculus VR	2014	2,000,000,000	2.720×10^{9}	Acquisition	
(China) Trustar Capital	(China) Lingxi Games	2026	2,000,000,000	2.000×10^{9}	Acquisition	
(Israel) Playtika	(Israel) SuperPlay	2024	1,950,000,000	2.063×10^{9}	Acquisition	
(United States) Zynga	(Turkey) Peak	2020	1,800,000,000	2.239×10^{9}	Acquisition	
(Japan) Bandai	(Japan) Namco	2005	1,700,000,000	2.802×10^{9}	Merger	
(United States) The Walt Disney Company	(United States) Epic Games (9%)	2024	1,500,000,000	1.539×10^{9}	Shares acquisition	
(China) Tencent	(Hong Kong) Leyou	2020	1,500,000,000	1.866×10^{9}	Acquisition	
(Saudi Arabia) Savvy Games Group	(Germany) ESL, (United Kingdom) FACEIT	2022	1,500,000,000	1.650×10^{9}	Acquisition	
(United States) Electronic Arts	(United Kingdom) Playdemic	2021	1,400,000,000	1.663×10^{9}	Acquisition	
(Sweden) Embracer Group	(United States) Gearbox Software	2021	1,300,000,000	1.545×10^{9}	Acquisition	
(China) Tencent	(France) Vantage Studios (26.3%)	2025	1,300,000,000	1.300×10^{9}	Shares acquisition	
(China) Tencent	(United Kingdom) Sumo Group	2021	1,270,000,000	1.509×10^{9}	Acquisition	
(United States) Electronic Arts	(United Kingdom) Codemasters	2020	1,200,000,000	1.493×10^{9}	Acquisition	
(China) Tencent	(Cyprus) Easybrain	2025	1,200,000,000	1.200×10^{9}	Acquisition	
(United States) Scopely	(United States) GSN Games	2021	1,000,000,000	1.188×10^{9}	Acquisition	
(France) Vivendi	(United States) Fox Interactive	2003				

== At least US$100 million ==
Acquirer(s)	Target	Year	Deal value (US$)	Inflation adjusted (US$)	Type	Ref.
(China) Zhongji Holding	(China) DianDian Interactive	2014	960,000,000	1.306×10^{9}	Acquisition	
(United States) Churchill Downs Incorporated	(United States) Big Fish Games	2014	885,000,000	1.204×10^{9}	Acquisition	
(United Kingdom) Tripledot Games	(United States) AppLovin Games	2025	800,000,000	821,000,000	Acquisition	
(Japan) Sega	(Finland) Rovio Entertainment	2023	776,000,000	820,000,000	Acquisition	
(United States) Electronic Arts	(Canada) BioWare (United States) Pandemic Studios	2007	775,000,000	1.203×10^{9}	Acquisition	
(United States) Electronic Arts	(United States) PopCap Games	2011	750,000,000	1.073×10^{9}	Acquisition	
(Japan) Square	(Japan) Enix	2003	727,000,000	1.272×10^{9}	Merger	
(United States) Zynga	(Finland) Small Giant Games	2018	700,000,000	897,000,000	Acquisition	
(United States) Electronic Arts	(United States) Jamdat Mobile	2005	680,000,000	1.121×10^{9}	Acquisition	
(Sweden) Embracer Group	(Cyprus) Easybrain	2021	640,000,000	760,000,000	Acquisition	
(United States) The Walt Disney Company	(United States) Playdom	2010	563,000,000	831,000,000	Acquisition	
(United States) Macarthur Fortune Holding	(United Kingdom) Jagex	2020	530,000,000	659,000,000	Acquisition	
(United States) Zynga	(United Kingdom) NaturalMotion	2014	527,000,000	717,000,000	Acquisition	
(Sweden) Embracer Group	(United States) Saber Interactive	2020	525,000,000	653,000,000	Acquisition	
(United States) Zynga	(China) StarLark	2021	525,000,000	624,000,000	Acquisition	
(South Korea) Krafton	(United States) Unknown Worlds	2021	500,000,000	594,000,000	Acquisition	
(South Korea) Nexon	(South Korea) Gloops	2012	486,000,000	682,000,000	Acquisition	
(United States) Take-Two Interactive	(United States) Gearbox Software	2024	460,000,000	472,000,000	Acquisition	
(Sweden) Embracer Group	(United States) Aspyr	2021	450,000,000	535,000,000	Acquisition	
(South Korea) Pearl Abyss	(Iceland) CCP Games	2018	425,000,000	545,000,000	Acquisition	
(Japan) Square Enix	(Japan) Taito	2005	409,100,000	674,000,000	Merger	
(Japan) DeNA	(United States) ngmoco	2010	400,000,000	591,000,000	Acquisition	
(United States) Electronic Arts	(United Kingdom) Playfish	2009	400,000,000	600,000,000	Acquisition	
(China) Tencent	(United States) Riot Games	2011	400,000,000	572,000,000	Acquisition	
(Japan) (United States) Sony Computer Entertainment	(United States) Gaikai	2012	380,000,000	533,000,000	Acquisition	
(United States) Take-Two Interactive	(Serbia) Nordeus	2021	378,000,000	449,000,000	Acquisition	
(United States) Microsoft	(United Kingdom) Rare	2002	375,000,000	671,000,000	Acquisition	
(United States) The Walt Disney Company	(Canada) New Horizon Interactive	2007	350,930,000	545,000,000	Acquisition	
(United States) Electronic Arts	(United States) Respawn Entertainment	2017	315,000,000	414,000,000	Acquisition	
(Sweden) Embracer Group	(Japan) (United Kingdom) Square Enix Europe	2022	300,000,000	330,000,000	Acquisition	
(Sweden) Enad Global 7	(United States) Daybreak Game Company	2020	300,000,000	373,000,000	Acquisition	
(United States) Take-Two Interactive	(Spain) Social Point	2017	250,000,000	328,000,000	Acquisition	
(United States) Zynga	(Turkey) Gram Games	2018	250,000,000	321,000,000	Acquisition	
(United States) Beacon Interactive	(United States) Saber Interactive	2024	247,000,000 (Note: Beacon Interactive has the option to later acquire 4A Games and Zen Studios from Embracer Group, which will raise the total acquisition price to $500 Million if exercised)	253,000,000	Acquisition	
(Japan) (United States) Sony Interactive Entertainment	(United States) Insomniac Games	2019	229,000,000	288,000,000	Acquisition	
(United States) Warner Bros. Interactive Entertainment	(United Kingdom) TT Games	2007	210,000,000	326,000,000	Acquisition	
(Japan) GREE, Inc.	(Japan) Funzio	2012	210,000,000	294,000,000	Acquisition	
(United States) Zynga	(United States) OMGPop	2012	210,000,000	294,000,000	Acquisition	
(United States) Lycos	(United States) Gamesville	1999	207,000,000	400,000,000	Acquisition	
(Japan) Koei	(Japan) Tecmo	2009	207,000,000	311,000,000	Merger	
(South Korea) NCSoft	(Germany) JustPlay (70%)	2026	205,000,000	205,000,000	Shares acquisition	
(United States) Take-Two Interactive	(United States) Playdots	2020	193,000,000	240,000,000	Acquisition	
(United States) Zynga	(Turkey) Rollic	2020	180,000,000	224,000,000	Acquisition	
(United States) Viacom	(United States) Harmonix	2006	175,000,000	279,000,000	Acquisition	
(United States) Jam City	(Canada) Ludia	2021	165,000,000	196,000,000	Acquisition	
(United States) Warner Bros. Interactive Entertainment	(United States) Turbine Entertainment Software	2010	160,000,000	236,000,000	Acquisition	
(United States) Mattel	(United States) (China) Mattel163	2026	159,000,000	159,000,000	Shares acquisition	
(Sweden) THQ Nordic AB	(Austria) (Germany) Koch Media	2018	149,600,000	192,000,000	Acquisition	
(China) Tencent	(Norway) Funcom	2020	148,000,000	184,000,000	Acquisition	
(Sweden) Embracer Group	(Poland) Flying Wild Hog	2020	137,000,000	170,000,000	Acquisition	
(France) Infogrames	(United States) GT Interactive	1999	135,000,000	261,000,000	Acquisition	
(Canada) Leaf Mobile	(Canada) East Side Games	2021	135,000,000	160,000,000	Acquisition	
(United States) Electronic Arts	(United States) Maxis	1997	125,000,000	251,000,000	Acquisition	
(Sweden) Embracer Group	(China) Perfect World Entertainment	2021	125,000,000	149,000,000	Acquisition	
(United States) Electronic Arts	(United States) Westwood Studios	1998	122,500,000	242,000,000	Acquisition	
(Japan) Square Enix	(United Kingdom) Eidos Interactive	2009	120,000,000	180,000,000	Acquisition	
(United States) Turtle Beach	(United States) Performance Designed Products	2024	118,000,000	121,000,000	Acquisition	
(United States) Microsoft	(United Kingdom) Ninja Theory	2018	117,000,000	150,000,000	Acquisition	
(Sweden) Aonic	(United Kingdom) NDreams	2023	110,000,000	116,000,000	Acquisition	
(Sweden) Embracer Group	(Canada) A Thinking Ape	2020	105,000,000	131,000,000	Acquisition	
(South Korea) NCSoft	(Singapore) Indygo Group (67%)	2025	103,800,000	104,000,000	Shares acquisition	
(Denmark) Nordisk Film	(Sweden) Avalanche Studios	2018	103,000,000	132,000,000	Acquisition	
(France) Infogrames	(United States) Hasbro Interactive	2000	100,000,000	187,000,000	Acquisition	
(United Kingdom) Sumo Group	(United States) Pipeworks Studios	2020	100,000,000	124,000,000	Acquisition	
(United States) Microsoft	(United States) Ensemble Studios	2001	100,000,000	182,000,000	Acquisition	

== At least US$1 million ==
Acquirer(s)	Target	Year	Deal value (US$)	Inflation adjusted (US$)	Type	Ref.
(South Korea) Krafton	(United States) Eleventh Hour Games	2025	96,000,000	96,000,000	Acquisition	
(Republic of Ireland) Keywords Studios	(United Kingdom) The Multiplayer Group	2023	95,240,000	101,000,000	Acquisition	
(Hong Kong) Leyou	(Canada) Digital Extremes	2014	73,200,000	100,000,000	Acquisition	
(United States) Hasbro Interactive	(United States) MicroProse	1998	70,000,000	138,000,000	Acquisition	
(China) 37Games (China) Orient Securities (Hong Kong) Leyou	(Japan) SNK Playmore	2015	63,500,000	86,000,000	Acquisition	
(France) Nacon	(Germany) Daedalic Entertainment	2022	60,200,000	66,000,000	Acquisition	
(United Kingdom) Eidos Interactive	(Denmark) IO Interactive	2004	51,120,000	87,000,000	Acquisition	
(China) Perfect World	(United States) Cryptic Studios	2011	50,000,000	72,000,000	Acquisition	
(Republic of Ireland) Keywords Studios	(United States) High Voltage Software	2020	50,000,000	62,000,000	Acquisition	
(Sweden) THQ Nordic AB	(Czech Republic) Warhorse Studios	2019	48,510,000	61,000,000	Acquisition	
(United States) Electronic Arts	(United Kingdom) Criterion Software	2004	48,000,000	82,000,000	Acquisition	
(France) Focus Home Interactive	(France) Dotemu	2021	46,000,000	55,000,000	Acquisition	
(Sweden) Embracer Group	(Malta) (Ukraine) 4A Games	2020	45,000,000	56,000,000	Acquisition	
(France) Nacon	(Australia) Big Ant Studios	2021	42,500,000	50,000,000	Acquisition	
(United States) Devolver Digital	(Netherlands) Good Shepherd Entertainment	2021	41,255,000	49,000,000	Acquisition	
(United States) Devolver Digital	(United States) System Era Softworks	2023	40,000,000	42,000,000	Acquisition	
(United Kingdom) Tripledot Games	(Israel) Supersonic	2026	40,000,000	40,000,000	Acquisition	
(United States) Take-Two Interactive	(United States) Angel Studios	2002	38,000,000 (Note: Take-Two Interactive bought Angel Studios for US$28 million in cash and 235,679 shares of restricted stock, totaling a value of approximately US$38 million.)	68,000,000	Acquisition	
(United States) Electronic Arts	(United States) Origin Systems	1992	35,000,000	80,000,000	Acquisition	
(Sweden) THQ Nordic AB	(Sweden) Coffee Stain Studios	2018	34,900,000	45,000,000	Acquisition	
(United States) Warner Bros. Interactive Entertainment	(United States) Midway Games	2009	33,000,000	50,000,000	Acquisition	
(Republic of Ireland) Keywords Studios	(United States) Forgotten Empires	2022	32,500,000	36,000,000	Acquisition	
(United States) Take-Two Interactive	(United States) Visual Concepts (United States) Kush Games	2005	32,200,000	53,000,000	Acquisition	
(United States) tinyBuild	(United States) Versus Evil	2021	31,300,000	37,000,000	Acquisition	
(United Kingdom) Codemasters	(United Kingdom) Slightly Mad Studios	2019	30,000,000	38,000,000	Acquisition	
(China) (United States) Project Golden Arc	(United States) Arc Games, Cryptic Studios	2025	30,000,000	30,000,000	Acquisition	
(Luxembourg) Atari	(Australia) Hipster Whale	2026	29,300,000	29,300,000	Acquisition	
(India) Nazara Technologies	(United Kingdom) Curve Games	2025	28,900,000	29,000,000	Acquisition	
(United States) Devolver Digital	(United Kingdom) Firefly Studios	2021	27,476,000	33,000,000	Acquisition	
(United States) Devolver Digital	(Croatia) Croteam	2020	26,935,000	34,000,000	Acquisition	
(Japan) Sega	(Canada) Relic Entertainment	2013	26,600,000	37,000,000	Acquisition	
(France) Ubisoft	(United Kingdom) Reflections Interactive	2006	24,000,000	38,000,000	Acquisition	
(Austria) (Germany) Koch Media	(United States) Volition	2013	23,000,000	32,000,000	Acquisition	
(Japan) Kadokawa Corporation	(Japan) From Software	2014	22,500,000	31,000,000	Acquisition	
(United States) Activision	(United States) Treyarch	2001	20,000,000	36,000,000	Acquisition	
(United States) Devolver Digital	(United Kingdom) Nerial	2021	17,353,000	21,000,000	Acquisition	
(United States) tinyBuild	(Russia) Bad Pixel	2021	17,100,000	20,000,000	Acquisition	
(United States) GT Interactive	(United Kingdom) Reflections Interactive	1999	14,700,000	28,000,000	Acquisition	
(United States) Griffin Gaming Partners	(France) Playdigious	2025	12,200,000	12,000,000	Acquisition	
(United States) Take-Two Interactive	(United Kingdom) DMA Design	2000	11,000,000	21,000,000	Acquisition	
(Sweden) Embracer Group	(Sweden) Tarsier Studios	2019	10,500,000	13,000,000	Acquisition	
(United States) tinyBuild	(United States) Animal	2021	10,100,000	12,000,000	Acquisition	
(Norway) Opera	(United Kingdom) YoYo Games	2021	10,000,000	12,000,000	Acquisition	
(France) Atari SA	(United States) Nightdive Studios	2023	10,000,000	11,000,000	Acquisition	
(Sweden) Starbreeze Studios	(India) Dhruva Interactive	2016	8,500,000	15,000,000	Acquisition	
(France) Focus Home Interactive	(Germany) Deck13	2020	7,900,000	10,000,000	Acquisition	
(United States) Take-Two Interactive	(India) Dhruva Interactive	2019	7,900,000	10,000,000	Acquisition	
(Sweden) Paradox Interactive	(United States) Harebrained Schemes	2018	7,500,000	10,000,000	Acquisition	
(France) Atari SA	(Sweden) Thunderful Group	2025	5,200,000	5,000,000	Acquisition	
(United States) Take-Two Interactive	(Canada) Barking Dog Studios	2002	3,000,000	5,000,000	Acquisition	

== Abandoned deals ==
Acquirer(s)	Target	Year	Deal value (US$)	Inflation adjusted (US$)	Type	Ref.
(France) Vivendi	(France) Ubisoft	2016	6,400,000,000	8.586×10^{9}	In 2018, Vivendi agreed to stop pursuing its hostile takeover bid for Ubisoft and sell its shares to various investors, including Tencent. Vivendi had completely divested its stake in Ubisoft by March 2019.	
(United States) Electronic Arts	(United States) Take-Two Interactive	2008	1,900,000,000	2.841×10^{9}	Although Take-Two were interested in merging with another company at the time, Strauss Zelnick and Take-Two's board of directors considered EA's cash offer inadequate. In September 2008, EA gave up on the acquisition and let the offer expire.	
(United States) Take-Two Interactive	(France) (United States) Vivendi Universal Games	2003	1,000,000,000	1.750×10^{9}	Take-Two planned to acquire Vivendi's video game division, which at the time was up for sale as part of the parent company's plan to sell $7.7 billion in assets. Take-Two's offer was far short of the $1.6 billion Vivendi sought for the business. Ultimately the deal never came to pass and Vivendi Games would later merge with Activision to form Activision Blizzard.	
(United States) Take-Two Interactive	(United Kingdom) Codemasters	2020	994,000,000	1.237×10^{9}	Take-Two offered to acquire Codemasters in November 2020 for approximately US$994 million and Codemasters subsequently accepted the deal. However, in December 2020, Electronic Arts placed a rival offer of $1.2 billion, 14% higher than Take-Two's bid, which Codemasters' board of directors agreed to instead. Take-Two formally withdrew its offer in January 2021, ceding to EA's bid. EA fully acquired Codemasters on February 21, 2021.	
(Israel) Playtika	(Finland) Rovio	2023	813,000,000	859,000,000	Playtika held preliminary discussions with Rovio about a potential acquisition in January 2023. Playtika made a €9.05 per share all-cash offer to Rovio's board of directors. Those discussions ended with no deal the following March and Rovio stated that it would seek merger discussions with other parties instead.	
(United States) Zynga	(Finland) Supercell	2012	400,000,000	400,000,000	Zynga had agreed to acquire Supercell for $400 million in an all-cash deal, but the acquisition was not completed after Zynga's board opposed the transaction. Zynga founder Mark Pincus attributed the board's decision to concerns about Zynga's management of its existing businesses, particularly following its $180 million acquisition of OMGPop, which he described as unsuccessful.	
(United States) GT Interactive	(United States) MicroProse	1997	250,000,000	501,000,000	Despite the merger agreement being signed and unanimously approved by both companies shareholders, the merger was called off two months after the deal was signed. The merger was reportedly called off due to "fundamental" disagreement over the handling of research and development costs. In the following years, MicroProse was acquired by Hasbro.	
(Japan) Square Enix	(Japan) Tecmo	2008	200,000,000	299,000,000	Tecmo rejected Square Enix's buyout offer, opting instead for a merger of equals with Koei.	
(United States) Elevation Partners	(United Kingdom) Eidos Interactive	2005	136,300,000	225,000,000	Elevation attempted to acquire Eidos in March 2005 as the newly formed firm's first acquisition, but were outbid by SCi, who ultimately acquired Eidos in May 2005.	
(United States) ZeniMax Media	(Canada) Relic Entertainment	2013	26,300,000	36,000,000	At THQ's bankruptcy auction, ZeniMax bid $26.3 million for Relic Entertainment and the Company of Heroes IP, but were subsequently outbid by Sega by only $300K, with Sega ultimately acquiring Relic.	

== See also ==
- List of largest media and entertainment mergers and acquisitions
