= INS Land =

Entertainment complex in Shanghai, China

- INS新乐园Xīn lè yuán
- Interactive map of the INS Land area

General information
- Location: Shanghai, 109 Yandang Rd, Huang Pu Qu
- Opened: 2023

Technical details
- Floor area: 20,000sqm

INS Land, also known as INS Park and an acronym for Into Nothing Serious, is a music and entertainment complex in Shanghai, China. Located in Fuxing Park in the Huangpu District, it covers approximately 20,000 square metres across six floors.

The complex contains multiple bar and club venues, as well as a 1,000 square-metre esports arena with a spectator capacity of 600.

== Background ==
=== Ownership and funding ===
INS Land was founded by Chinese businessman and investor Dino Ying in June 2023. Ying is also the co-founder and chairman of esports organisation Hero Esports, whose key stakeholders include Tencent and Saudi government-owned Savvy Games Group.

Not accounting for the property purchase price, the renovation and construction costs associated with the creation of INS Land were more than US$100 million, part of which was personally funded by Ying.

=== Operation ===
While the venues inside are operated independently, the complex has a single entry fee of ¥288 (approximately $40 USD), which grants attendees access to 10 different nightclubs and complimentary drinks.

The complex has been dubbed as a “Disneyland for adults” on the Chinese social media platform Xiaohongshu, aka. Rednote, and the concept for the space was to be "for young people to have fun,” according to the founder, Ying.

Young people account for over 90% of the complex’s attendees. On Halloween 2023, approximately 50,000 people made their way into the area.

The complex opened following a prolonged period of nightlife venue closure across China’s major cities due to lockdown restrictions during the COVID-19 pandemic.

The company plans to build three more INS Land-style venues: in Xi'an, Chengdu, and Shenzhen.

=== Esports Events ===
In addition to monthly events, the complex's esports arena hosted the group stage draw of the 2023 Honor of Kings International Championship and is expected to host more international events in future.

The venue also hosted the launch ceremony of Hero Esport’s inaugural Asian Championship League (ACL) in September 2024. ACL is Asia’s first multi-title esports tournament and will have a prize pool of $2 million USD.

The launch of INS Land preceded strong growth in the esports industry. Industry revenue grew by 4.6% in 2024, up to $3.8 billion USD, following a 1.3% decline in 2023.

=== Venues ===
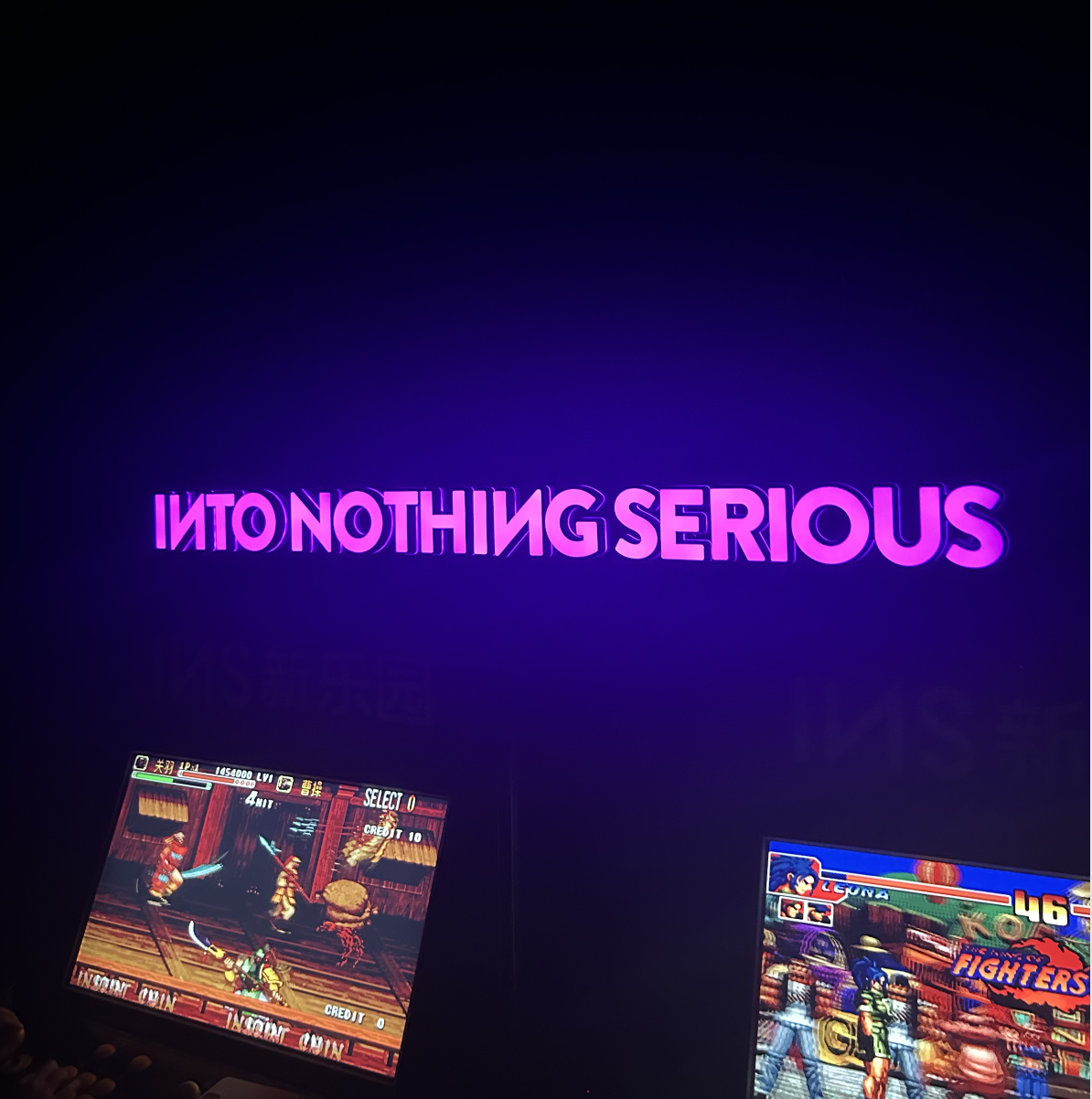
Hush, one of the clubs at INS, since 2023.

Since opening in 2023, INS Land has hosted nightclubs, restaurants, music venues, a comedy club, a cocktail lounge, and a Chinese karaoke bar, in addition to its core esports arena.

Cocktail bar Sober Company opened a venue in INS in 2023 after closing their previous premises 16 months prior.

Upmarket club La Fin, on level 6 of INS, has been attended by Hong Kong singer-songwriter and Got7 member Jackson Wang.

Other spaces include electronic music venues RADI and Dirty House and live music space KEZEE.

== See also ==
- Dino Ying
- Hero Esports
