= Dino Ying =

Chinese esports businessman

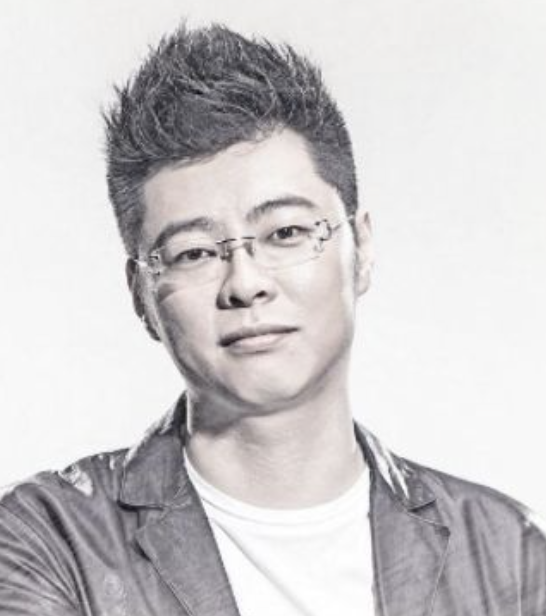
Photo of Dino Ying CEO and Founder of Hero Games

Dino Ying (Chinese name 应书岭; pinyin: Ying Shuling) (born 16 June 1981) is a Chinese businessman and investor. Ying represents the advancement of esports within international sports bodies, including the Global Esports Federation and Olympic Council of Asia.

He is the founder, chairman and former CEO of Hero Esports, a Chinese e-sports company, and founder of Hero Games, a Chinese game developer and producer. He is also the founder of INS Park, an e-sports and music entertainment complex in Shanghai.

In 2025, Ying was reported on the Hurun Rich List as being worth 200 Billion RMB / US$ 2.8 bn.

== Career ==
=== Esports Representative ===
In addition to his business interests, Ying serves on international panels promoting esports and gaming within the overall sports and entertainment worlds.

In January 2024 Ying was named as a member of the first Esports and EMartial Arts Committee of the Olympic Council of Asia, and on June 3, 2024, Ying was named as Vice President of the Global Esports Federation.

=== Hero Games ===
In June 2015, Ying co-founded Hero Games, serving initially as CEO and chairman.

In 2024, the company co-produced Black Myth: Wukong, having been an early investor in its developer Game Science. The game, the first Chinese effort at a AAA video game, sold more than 10 million units in three days, and 20 million units in its first month, making it one of the fastest selling games of all time. Black Myth: Wukong won the Golden Joystick Ultimate Game of the Year 2024.

=== Hero Esports ===
In 2016, Ying co-founded VSPN, as CEO and chairman, holding a majority stake of 35% of voting rights, to develop consumers' esports experience by connecting both physical and online worlds. VSPN rebranded as VSPO; and now operates as Hero Esports. With a workforce of over 1600, Hero Esports leads the Asian market in terms of tournament operation and commercialisation, and has produced over 1000 professional esports matches across the world. It counts Savvy Games Group, a unit of Saudi Arabia's Public Investment Fund, as a key shareholder after a US$265 million investment in February 2023.

=== INS Land ===
On June 16, 2023, Ying opened INS Land in Shanghai, China, a commercial complex that combines esports arenas, night clubs, restaurants and comedy clubs. The company also owns and operates esports venues in Xi'an, Chengdu and Seoul.
