= Kayla Sims =

American YouTuber (born 1999)

- Born: Kayla Marie Sims; August 14, 1999 (age 27); Chicago, Illinois, U.S.
- Education: University of Central Florida
- Occupations: YouTuber; Twitch streamer
- Spouse: Dan Grenander (m. 2021)

Twitch information
- Channel: lilsimsie
- Years active: 2015–present
- Games: The Sims 4, Animal Crossing, Among Us, Stardew Valley and Tomodachi Life
- Followers: 944 thousand

YouTube information
- Channel: lilsimsie
- Years active: 2012–present
- Genre: Gaming
- Subscribers: 2.22 million
- Views: 1.14 billion
- Last updated: April 15, 2026
- Website: lilsimsie.com

Kayla Marie Sims (born August 14, 1999), also known by her username lilsimsie, is an American YouTuber, Twitch streamer, and philanthropist. She is best known for playing The Sims 4, her collaborations with EA on projects such as The Sims 4: Snowy Escape and The Sims 4: Growing Together, and her charity work for St. Jude Children's Research Hospital.

== Career ==
=== YouTube ===
Sims started making YouTube videos about The Sims in 2015. Her most popular YouTube video, "Building in The Sims but Each Room is a Different Budget", has over 4 million views. As of February 2026, she has 2.21 million subscribers.

Sims is the creator of the Wolf Pack challenge, which uses The Sims 4: Cats & Dogs expansion pack, and the Not So Berry legacy challenge, created with her friend Zoë (alwaysimming). In 2019, for her "Simsie Save", in which she renovates the game's worlds and characters, she made all toilets in her save gender-neutral. One of her longest running YouTube series was the "100 Baby Challenge" series, in which she completed the 100 Baby Challenge in The Sims 4 over the course of five years.

In a July 2020 patch to The Sims 4, all cowplants in the game were given the default name "Little Simzee" as a nod to Sims' campaign for the ability to name cowplants in game. Part of this campaign included getting the #justiceforcowplants trending on The Sims 4 Gallery via a "shell" building challenge. In August 2020, she joined other Sims YouTubers in speaking out against the lack of diversity in skin tones in The Sims 4. The item All-In-One Gemology Table By Humphrey, Inc. in The Sims 4: Crystal Creations, released in February 2024, is named after her rags-to-riches testplay Sim named Stanley Humphrey.

Sims was a judge on YouTube's gaming creator competition show, uTure. The show ended August 13, 2022.

=== Twitch ===
Sims has a Twitch channel with 950 thousand followers, and usually streams six days per week. In 2018, she was nominated for Streamer of the Year at Summer in the City for her streaming on Twitch. In January 2021, an illustration of her cat was made the PogChamp emote on Twitch for a day.

Sims, as part of the team Sandy's Candies with streamers brandiganBTW, Fuzzireno, and TheHaboo, won the first Stardew Valley Cup in September 2021.

In May 2022, Sims revisited the subject of one of her most popular videos, in which she left her Sims 4 game unpaused all night, only this time on her Twitch stream instead of in a YouTube video.

==== Charity streams ====
In May 2020, Sims organized her first charity stream for St. Jude Children's Research Hospital. In May 2021, she participated in the St. Jude Play Live event, this time streaming every day for the entire month of May, and raised $369,000 for St. Jude, bringing her total amount raised for that charity to over $500,000. Sims has hosted her May charity fundraiser every year since, raising over $1,000,000 in both 2025 and 2026.

Sims used to be a supporter of AbleGamers, a charity dedicated to making games accessible to disabled children, and has raised money for them on multiple campaigns since 2020. In August 2021, she raised over $100,000 for AbleGamers to help Steven Spohn reach his birthday fundraising goal of $1,000,000. She distanced herself from the organization after accusations of abuse, misogyny, and mismanaging of funds at AbleGamers came to light in an article published in May 2025 on IGN.

In June 2021, Sims raised $15,000 for the Transgender Law Center during a charity stream.

As of May 2026, Sims has raised a lifetime total of over $5,000,000.

=== Response to the proposed private buyout of EA ===
Sims was part of the EA Creator Network for a significant period of time, but the exact date she joined is not known. However, in October 2025, she, along with other prominent The Sims creators, left the EA Creator Network in protest of the private buyout deal of EA.

"I will no longer receive early access to Sims packs, and I will not have a creator code," Sims said of her decision to leave the EA Creator Network. "Under this new ownership I feel I cannot maintain a direct association to the company. I also truly believe that they benefit more from my early access content than I do, and I think that stepping away is the strongest action I can take against the sale."

In 2026, Sims worked with the advocacy group, Players Alliance, to protest the buyout and hosted a livestream with congressman Maxwell Frost on the subject.

=== Other work ===
In October 2020, Sims announced her collaboration on The Sims 4: Snowy Escape expansion pack, creating three lots for the game: 6–4–1 Hanamigawa, 5–6–1 Shinrinyoku, and 2–5–1 Wakabamori. In January 2023, she announced her collaboration on The Sims 4: Growing Together expansion pack, creating three lots for the game: Celebration Center, Sequoia Cottage, and 13 Acacia Avenue. She collaborated with the franchise again with The Sims 4: Comfy Gamer kit, released in 2025.

Sims also created content for TikTok. In January 2022, a TikTok she made explaining first-person mode in The Sims 4 and featuring a Sim making a grilled cheese sandwich was removed for "nudity and sexual activity". The TikTok was subsequently restored and has over 500 thousand views.

== Personal life ==
Sims lived in Chicago until her family moved to Florida when she was 4. She began playing The Sims when she was 12 and became particularly interested in the game after her father was diagnosed with cancer when she was 14. She has attributed the game with helping her cope with her father's diagnosis, using it as an “escape”. She graduated from the University of Central Florida in May 2020 with a bachelor's degree in history.

Sims married fellow streamer Dan Grenander on August 25, 2021 in a small courthouse wedding. The couple later hosted a larger wedding ceremony on February 8, 2025, due to the restrictions placed on their original ceremony by the COVID-19 pandemic and Grenander's fiancé visa. Previously, Grenander had moved to the United States to live with Sims in July 2021 on a K-1 fiancé visa after living in the United Kingdom. They applied for the visa in February 2020. Grenander streams on Twitch under the name “duckdan” and uploads to his associated YouTube channel under the same name. He often plays games such as Dead by Daylight, Fall Guys, and Minecraft. The couple often play games together as well, such as Among Us, Fall Guys, and Mario Kart. They live in Orlando, Florida.

== Awards and nominations ==
Year	Award	Category	Result	Ref.
2026	The Streamer Awards	Best Cozy Game Streamer	Nominated	
2026	The Game Awards	Content Creator of the Year	Pending	
