= List of acquisitions by Take-Two Interactive =

Take-Two Interactive is an American video game holding company. They have acquired many publishers and developers since the company's foundation in 1993. Today, most of Take-Two Interactive's developers operate as subsidiaries of its publishing arms: 2K, Rockstar Games and Zynga

== Acquisitions ==
Date	Company	Parent division	Country	Value (USD)	Adjusted (USD)	Derived studios	Reference
September 1996	Mission Studios	Take-Two Interactive	USA	2,114,478	4,000,000	Mission Studios	
April 1997	GameTek	Rockstar Games	USA			Rockstar Toronto	
March 1998	BMG Interactive	Rockstar Games	UK	14,200,000	28,000,000	Rockstar Games	
June 1998	Tarantula Studios	Rockstar Games	UK			Rockstar Lincoln	
August 1998	Jack of All Games	Take-Two Interactive	USA	16,800,000	33,000,000	Jack of All Games	
December 1998	Talonsoft	Take-Two Interactive	USA			Talonsoft	
August 1999	Global Star Software	Take-Two Interactive	CAN			Global Star Software	
September 1999	DMA Design	Rockstar Games	UK	11,000,000	21,000,000	Rockstar North	
February 2000	Joytech	Take-Two Interactive	UK			Joytech	
March 2000	Pixel Broadband Studios	Take-Two Interactive	Israel			Pixel Broadband Studios	
April 2000	Telstar Electronic Studios	Take-Two Interactive	UK				
April 2000	DVDWave.com	Take-Two Interactive	USA			DVDWave.com	
May 2000	Gathering of Developers	Take-Two Interactive	USA			Gathering of Developers	
July 2000	PopTop Software	2K Games	USA	5,800,000	11,000,000	PopTop Software	
January 2001	Neo Software	Rockstar Games	Austria			Rockstar Vienna	
July 2001	Techcorp	Take-Two Interactive	Hong Kong			Techcorp	
August 2002	Barking Dog Studios	Rockstar Games	Canada	3,000,000	5,000,000	Rockstar Vancouver	
November 2002	Angel Studios	Rockstar Games	USA	34,700,000	62,000,000	Rockstar San Diego	
March 2003	Frog City Software	2K Games	USA			Frog City Software	
April 2003	Cat Daddy Games	2K Games	USA			Cat Daddy Games	
September 2003	TDK Mediactive	Take-Two Interactive	USA	22,700,000	40,000,000	Take-Two Licensing	
April 2004	Möbius Entertainment	Rockstar Games	UK			Rockstar Leeds	
September 2004	Venom Games	2K Games	UK			Venom Games	
October 2004	Access Software	2K Games	USA			Indie Built	
January 2005	Visual Concepts; Kush Games	2K Games	USA	32,200,000	53,000,000	Visual Concepts; 2K Los Angeles	
June 2005	PAM Software	2K Games	France	11,400,000	19,000,000	PAM Software	
November 2005	Firaxis Games	2K Games	USA	27,000,000	45,000,000	Firaxis Games	
January 2006	Irrational Games	2K Games	USA	10,000,000	16,000,000	Irrational Games; 2K Australia	
January 2008	Illusion Softworks	2K Games	Czech Republic			2K Czech	
April 2008	Mad Doc Software	Rockstar Games	UK			Rockstar New England	
February 2016	Social Point	Take-Two Interactive	Spain	250,000,000	335,000,000	Social Point	
May 2019	Dhruva Interactive	Rockstar Games	India	7,900,000	10,000,000	Rockstar India (Note: Rockstar India already existed before the acquisition, with Dhruva Interactive being merged into the studio.)	
August 2020	Playdots	Take-Two Interactive	USA	192,000,000	239,000,000	Playdots	
October 2020	Ruffian Games	Rockstar Games	UK			Rockstar Dundee	
March 2021	HB Studios	2K Games	Canada			HB Studios	
March 2021	HookBang's gaming division	2K Games	USA			Visual Concepts Austin	
June 2021	Nordeus	Take-Two Interactive	Serbia	378,000,000	449,000,000	Nordeus	
July 2021	Dynamixyz	Take-Two Interactive	France			Dynamixyz	
November 2021	Elite3D; Turia Games	2K Games	Spain			31st Union Spain	
November 2021	Roll7	Private Division	UK			Roll7	
January 2022	Zynga	Take-Two Interactive	USA	12,700,000,000	13,972,000,000	Chartboost; Echtra Games; NaturalMotion; Peak Games; Rollic; Small Giant Games; StarLark	
September 2022	Storemaven	Zynga	Israel			Storemaven	
March 2023	GameClub	Take-Two Interactive	USA				
March 2024	Gearbox Entertainment	2K Games	USA	460,000,000	472,000,000	Gearbox Software	
March 2025	Video Games Deluxe	Rockstar Games	AUS			Rockstar Australia	
