= The Sims 4 =

2014 video game

- Cover art since 2019
- Developer: Maxis (Note: Blind Squirrel Games co-developed the PlayStation 4 and Xbox One versions.)
- Publisher: Electronic Arts
- Directors: Michael Duke; Berjes Enriquez; Jim Rogers; Robert Vernick
- Producers: Kevin Gibson; Grant Rodiek; Ryan Vaughan
- Designers: Eric Holmberg-Weidler; Matt Yang
- Artists: Magnus Hollmo; Samantha Miceli; Steven Ross
- Writer: Danielle von Mayrhauser
- Composer: Ilan Eshkeri
- Series: The Sims
- Platforms: Windows; macOS; PlayStation 4; Xbox One
- Release: Windows: NA: September 2, 2014; AU/EU: September 4, 2014; UK: September 5, 2014; macOS: WW: February 17, 2015; PS4, Xbox One: WW: November 17, 2017
- Genre: Social simulation
- Mode: Single-player

The Sims 4 is a social simulation game developed by Maxis and published by Electronic Arts. The game was released on September 2, 2014, for Windows, and is the fourth main installment in The Sims series, following The Sims 3 (2009). As with previous games in the series, The Sims 4 allows players to create and customize characters named "Sims", build and furnish their homes, and simulate their daily life across various in-game regions. This installment introduced a newly developed custom game engine, featuring enhanced character creation and housebuilding tools, as well as a more complex in-game simulation.

Development plans for The Sims 4 initially included a stronger focus on online functionality, but these plans were dropped following the negative launch reception of Maxis' online-only SimCity in 2013. In the months leading up to the game's release, Maxis revealed that several features from previous Sims titles, such as swimming pools and toddler Sims, would be omitted, citing development time constraints and technical challenges; this decision led to backlash from players. Upon release, The Sims 4 received mixed reviews, with critics praising the game's visual design, improved artificial intelligence for Sims, and streamlined building tools, but criticizing the absence of content found in prior Sims titles, frequent loading screens, and glitches.

The Sims 4 topped the Ukie all-format video game chart in 2014, and as of 2024, has received over 85 million players worldwide. A macOS version was released in February 2015, followed by PlayStation 4 and Xbox One versions in November 2017. In 2022, the game shifted to a free-to-play model, supported by paid downloadable content (DLC) packs that have been released regularly since launch. These DLC packs include twenty-one expansion packs and twelve game packs, adding new features, objects, and worlds; the most recent expansion pack, Royalty & Legacy, was released on February 12, 2026.

Free content updates have also been released, reintroducing swimming pools and toddler Sims, as well as adding more character customization options, building tools, diverse gender identities, sexual orientations, and gameplay scenarios. A new multiplayer-focused The Sims title, under the working title "Project Rene", is in development.

== Gameplay ==
The Sims 4 is a social simulation game, and like preceding titles in The Sims series, the game is open-ended, with no primary objectives or storyline to complete, instead focusing on creativity and experimentation. Players follow and manage the lives of virtual people called "Sims", directing their actions, attending to their "needs", and helping them reach personal goals and desires. Players can also engage in goal-oriented gameplay if desired—each Sim has a lifelong aspiration, and dynamically generated "wants and fears" based on current gameplay.

Simoleons (§) are the unit of currency in the game, and Sims communicate in a fictional language called Simlish. Sims have six "needs"—hunger, bladder, hygiene, social, fun, and energy—that deplete throughout the in-game day and are replenished through various household items and furniture; for example, Sims can take a shower if hygiene is low or cook food if hunger is low. Sims primarily make money by getting a job and improve their job performance by developing "skills"; for example, a Sim in the Culinary career needs to develop their Cooking and Mixology skills. A variety of cheats are available, such as those for unlimited money or unlocking hidden gameplay options.

Optional paid downloadable content (DLC) packs add new gameplay features, objects, worlds, and clothing to the game. Additionally, the macOS and Windows versions of The Sims 4 support extensive modding; fan-designed cosmetic items, such as hairstyles, makeup, clothing, and furniture, known as custom content (CC), can be installed for use in the game.

=== Create-a-Sim ===
In The Sims 4's Create-a-Sim mode, Sim facial and bodily features are adjusted by directly selecting and manipulating the respective area.

Create-a-Sim (CAS) is the main interface for creating and designing an individual Sim or household in The Sims 4. Facial and bodily features are adjusted by directly selecting and manipulating the respective area. Sims exist in eight life stages: newborn, infant, toddler, child, teen, young adult, adult, and elder. Toddlers were added in a 2017 game update, while a 2023 update replaced the baby life stage with newborn and infant.

Adult Sims have three personality traits, while children and teens have two. Each Sim also has an aspiration, which grants an additional unique trait. Traits shape the personality and behavior of a Sim, while aspirations are lifelong goals with tasks that, once completed, reward the Sim with a beneficial trait that boosts actions related to the aspiration. A "Play with Genetics" option allows players to create relatives with inherited features such as facial structure, skin tone, hair color, and eye color. A 2021 update introduced "likes and dislikes", which reflect a Sim's preferred aesthetics and activities, and are assigned in Create-a-Sim or developed during gameplay.

Expansion packs and game packs introduce occult Sims, such as aliens, vampires, mermaids, spellcasters, and werewolves. Cat and dog pets are introduced via the Cats & Dogs expansion pack, and can be created in Create-a-Sim or adopted during gameplay. A 2016 update expanded gender options, allowing for more inclusive clothing and hairstyle options, as well as pregnancy, regardless of gender. After player demand, a 2020 update introduced an expanded range of skin tones, as well as additional makeup customization.

Preferred pronoun options for Sims were introduced in a 2022 update, developed with the It Gets Better Project and GLAAD; players can assign or create custom pronouns for Sims. Another 2022 update added sexual orientation for Sims, allowing for different romantic and sexual attractions, as well as sexual fluidity.

=== Build mode ===
Build mode in The Sims 4 includes tools for resizing, moving, and duplicating entire rooms and buildings.

Build mode is the main interface for constructing and furnishing houses and lots in The Sims 4. Players can construct buildings and design interior layouts, save their custom buildings or lots into the in-game library, or place down pre-made rooms and buildings. Rooms are constructed by drawing walls or placing shaped templates, and can be redrawn or resized later. New to The Sims 4 is the ability to move and duplicate rooms and buildings.

Bodies of water, such as fountains, swimming pools, and ponds, can be constructed. Interior construction options include doors, archways, half-walls, stairs, wall coverings, and floor coverings. Players can customize buildings extensively, with options for multiple floors, various wall heights, adjustable foundations, and free placement of doors and windows. To furnish a home, players purchase furniture and appliances in Build mode, such as televisions, chairs, showers, beds, and fridges. Each item has a specific function, ranging from fulfilling a Sim's need to building a skill or adding decoration. Some items are locked and become available as Sims progress in their careers or through cheat codes.

=== Worlds ===
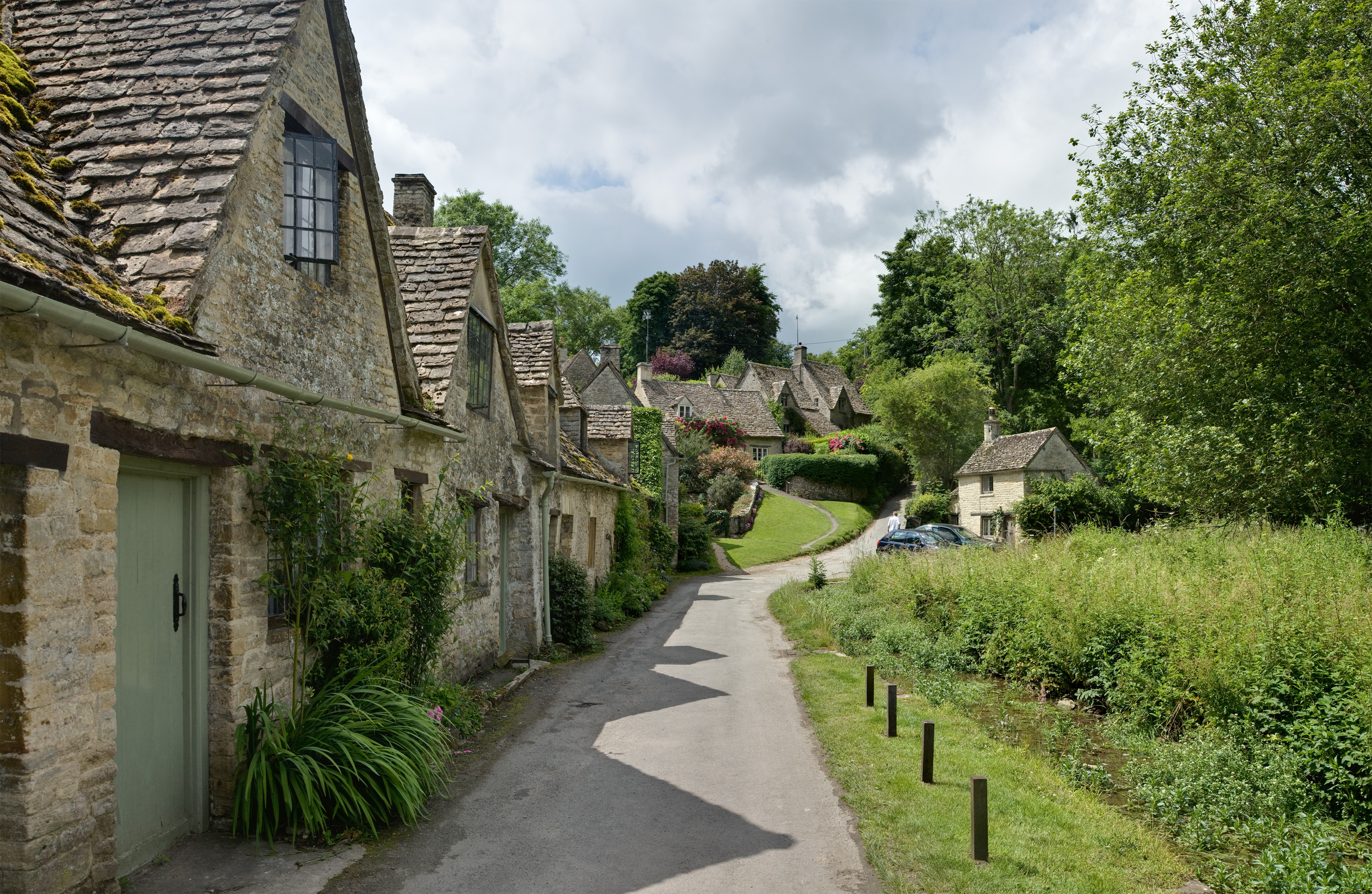
Worlds included in The Sims 4's DLC packs frequently draw inspiration from real-life locations; areas in rural England—such as Cotswolds (pictured)—were cited as inspirations for the Henford-on-Bagley world in Cottage Living.

A world is a collection of several neighborhoods, and each world contains a fixed number of lots that players can customize or build from scratch. Lots can be zoned as residential or community spaces. Sims can visit lots in any world, regardless of which world they reside in, and Sims from other households appear as non-player characters roaming through worlds. Unlike its predecessor The Sims 3 (2009), The Sims 4 does not have open worlds; instead, traveling between lots triggers a loading screen, although neighborhoods incorporate limited open-world functionality through interactive objects.

The Sims 4 includes three worlds in the base game: Willow Creek and Oasis Springs contain pre-constructed houses, community lots, and families; Newcrest, a sandbox world added in a 2015 update, contains only blank lots for players to build on. Expansion packs and "game packs" add new worlds to the game, with the added world usually being a core feature of the pack. These worlds draw inspiration from real-life locations; for example, Island Living introduces a tropical world named Sulani, Jungle Adventure introduces a Latin American–inspired vacation world named Selvadorada, Snowy Escape introduces a mountainous Japan-inspired world named Mt. Komorebi, and Cottage Living introduces a rural England-inspired world named Henford-on-Bagley.

=== New gameplay features ===
The Gallery is an in-game online content exchange service that allows players to upload and share Sims, Sim households, rooms, and buildings. Emotion is a gameplay mechanic, building on the mood systems in previous titles. Emotions can affect and be affected by in-game actions, events, and social interactions. There are several types and intensities of emotions, such as happy, sad, and angry. A multitasking system allows Sims to perform multiple actions simultaneously, such as having a conversation while cooking.

== Development ==
Maxis began development of The Sims 4 under the codename "Olympus", focused on online multiplayer gameplay, as part of publisher Electronic Arts' (EA) commitment to releasing titles with online capabilities. EA Labels president Frank Gibeau stated in 2012, "I have not greenlit one game to be developed as a single-player experience. Today, all of our games include online applications and digital services that make them live 24/7/365." These plans were altered following the negative launch reception of Maxis' SimCity in March 2013, which was plagued with widespread technical and gameplay problems relating to the game's mandatory network connectivity. Maxis confirmed in 2013 that The Sims 4 would be a single-player and offline experience. Development of The Sims 4 was also affected by layoffs at EA Salt Lake in January 2014, which was assisting in development of the game. The failure of SimCity contributed to the eventual closure of its developer, Maxis Emeryville, in 2015. Remaining EA Salt Lake and Maxis Emeryville employees working on the game were transferred to Maxis' Redwood Shores studio in Redwood City.

The Sims 4 uses a newly developed proprietary game engine, marketed as "SmartSim". In conjunction with this engine, Maxis focused on developing the new Sim emotion system for The Sims 4, as well as more expressive and complex Sim animations, and described Sim behavior in previous The Sims titles as "robotic" in comparison. Development of walking animations and facial expressions centered on better illustrating the emotions of Sims in gameplay, and making social interactions between Sims appear more natural and lifelike.

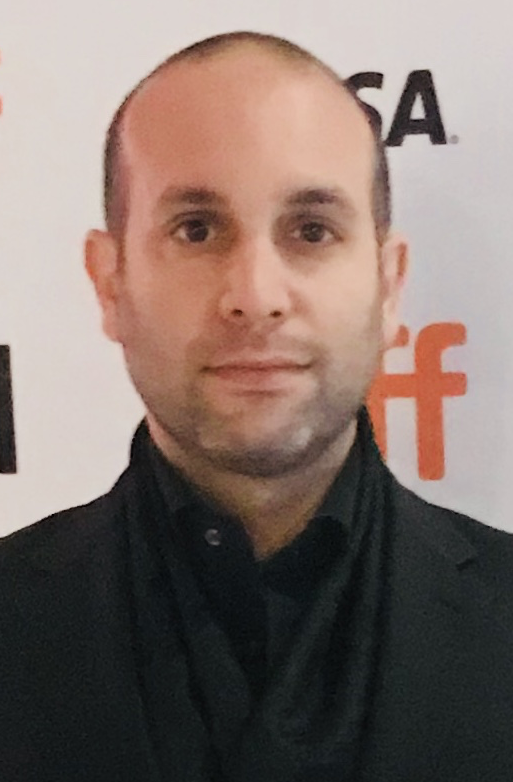
Ilan Eshkeri's music compositions for the game were designed to highlight the new Sim emotion system during gameplay.

British neoclassical composer Ilan Eshkeri composed the game's orchestral soundtrack. His work included over 140 brief sound effects to accompany various "key emotional moments" involving Sims, such as encountering a fight, a first kiss, a wedding, or a toilet breaking. The Sims 4's soundtrack was designed to emphasize the impact of Sim emotions during these gameplay events. Eshkeri cited difficulty in composing music for the game because of its sandbox nature, contrasting it to his previous works with film scores. All music was recorded at Abbey Road Studios in London, and performed by the London Metropolitan Orchestra.

== Release and marketing ==
The Sims 4 was announced by Maxis on May 6, 2013, for release in 2014. Early gameplay demos and trailers were unveiled at Gamescom in August 2013. More gameplay trailers were released on YouTube in May 2014, such as a Create-a-Sim trailer showcasing the variety of Sim customization options, and a Build mode trailer showcasing the game's new interface and building tools. A presentation at the Electronic Entertainment Expo (E3) on June 9, 2014, included gameplay demonstrations, as well as the release dates for the Windows version of the game in September 2014: September 2 in North America, September 4 in Australia and Europe, and September 5 in the UK. A free playable demo of the Create-a-Sim feature was released on August 12, 2014, for Windows.

A macOS version of the game was released on February 17, 2015. PlayStation 4 and Xbox One versions were released on November 17, 2017, co-developed with Blind Squirrel Games; unlike previous The Sims entries on consoles, the console versions of The Sims 4 are direct ports of the macOS and Windows versions and are compatible with the same DLC packs.

=== Collaborative promotions ===
SteelSeries released a Sims-themed gaming headset, mouse, and "Plumbob" USB light as part of the game's launch in 2014; LED lights in the peripherals change color according to the playable Sim's mood. A 2019 collaboration with Italian luxury fashion house Moschino featured a collection of clothing with pixel art inspired by the franchise, and a Moschino-themed stuff pack titled Moschino Stuff. A reality competition TV series, The Sims Spark'd, premiered on TBS from July 17 to August 7, 2020, featuring twelve contestants from popular YouTube channels in the Sims fan community; contestants were tasked with gameplay challenges within The Sims 4 and creating characters and stories according to each challenge's themes and limitations. The "Sims Sessions" in-game music festival was a limited-time event hosted from June 29 to July 7, 2021, accessible within a special area in the game world. Singers Bebe Rexha, Glass Animals frontman Dave Bayley, and Joy Oladokun recorded Simlish versions of their songs "Sabotage", "Heat Waves", and "Breathe Again", respectively, for their in-game performances during the event. A free update released in 2026 added items designed by American luxury fashion house Coach.

== Reception ==
=== Missing features controversy ===
In the months leading up to the game's release in September 2014, Maxis revealed that several key gameplay features present in previous The Sims titles, such as swimming pools and toddler Sims, would be absent from The Sims 4. Additionally, the open worlds and the "Create-a-Style" color customization gameplay technologies introduced in The Sims 3 would also be absent from the game. These announcements sparked backlash from players, leading to a petition on Change.org. Maxis responded in a statement, explaining that development resources allocated to the newly developed game engine, artificial intelligence simulation system, and revamped Create-a-Sim and Build modes, led to the omissions. They stated, "it was not possible for us to include every single feature and piece of content we added to The Sims 3 over the last five years", but left open the possibility of reintroducing these features in future updates or DLC.

=== Critical reception ===
Reviews

Aggregate score
| Aggregator | Score |
|---|---|
| Metacritic | PC: 70/100; PS4: 66/100; XONE: 66/100 |

Review scores
| Publication | Score |
|---|---|
| GameRevolution | 3.5/5 |
| GameSpot | 6/10 |
| Hardcore Gamer | 2.5/5 |
| IGN | 7.5/10 (Note: IGN re-evaluated the game in 2024, increasing their score to 8/10.) |
| Joystiq | 3.5/5 |
| PC Gamer (US) | 79/100 |
| PCGamesN | 7/10 |
| Polygon | 6.5/10 |

The Sims 4 received "mixed or average" reviews from critics upon its release, according to review aggregator site Metacritic. Reviewers frequently criticized The Sims 4's missing gameplay features and content compared to previous titles, particularly The Sims 3's "Create-a-Style" color customization tool, open worlds, and gameplay elements from its expansion packs; reviewers also noted encountering frequent loading screens and occasional glitches. The PlayStation 4 and Xbox One versions of the game, released in 2017, received additional criticism for their controller-based controls, as well as various bugs, glitches, and performance issues.

James Stephanie Sterling of The Escapist described the gameplay as "boring", and The Sims 4 as "shrunken and sterile". Kallie Plagge of IGN was disappointed by the lack of "cool objects" in place of missing content, and noted a lack of furnishing options in Build mode compared to The Sims 3. Nick Tan of GameRevolution described the game as a "case study for loss aversion", noting frustration among Sims fans due to the missing features and content, concluding that the game is "woefully incomplete". Steve Hogarty of PCGamesN described the base game as "feature-light and skeletal" without any DLC packs. Reviewers speculated that the significant lack of content was intended to leave room for potential future paid DLC packs, and was an intentional financial decision by EA. Lee Cooper of Hardcore Gamer concluded that the game is "a glorified freemium app with multiple expansions on the horizon that should have been part of the core game." Griffin McElroy of Polygon summarized the game's overall lack of content as: "In one in-game lifetime, I felt like I'd seen everything there was to offer, killing any desire I had to start over."

On the positive side, reviewers praised the game's improved graphical quality, intuitive Build mode and Create-a-Sim tools, the Sim emotion and multitasking systems in gameplay, and the Gallery feature. Plagge of IGN commended that she did not need to micro-manage Sims' interactions with the multitasking system. Cooper of Hardcore Gamer described the new Create-a-Sim as a "veritable hodgepodge of options", despite the omission of Create-a-Style. VanOrd of GameSpot praised the visual and audio design, and described the combination of the emotion and multitasking systems as a "sheer delight". Tan of GameRevolution lauded the "unbelievable" animation quality, intuitive game interface, and better performance and stability compared to previous The Sims titles. Chris Thursten of PC Gamer highlighted the ability to download lookalike Sims of real-life celebrities via the Gallery, and noted that the emotion system "changes the feel and flow of the game". Alexander Sliwinski of Joystiq commended the new search function in Build mode. Hogarty of PCGamesN highlighted the game's "clean sheet" stability and greater simulation depth of individual Sims compared to The Sims 3.

=== Player count and sales ===
The Sims 4 has received over 85 million players worldwide across all platforms as of May 2024, according to EA. This includes 31 million players gained since the game went free-to-play in October 2022. EA also reported in 2019 that the game had generated over $1 billion of total revenue, including DLC pack sales. Following its first week of release in 2014, The Sims 4 topped the Ukie all-format video game chart, and was the first PC-only game to do so since Guild Wars 2 (2012). EA reported in 2018 that all expansion packs combined had sold over 30 million units.

== Post-release ==
In response to player criticism about missing features, Maxis pledged to support the game with free content and feature updates. This includes features from past The Sims main titles that were excluded at launch such as swimming pools, genealogy, toddler Sim life stage, and basements. Other major features added in updates include an additional sandbox world, gender and pronoun customization in Create-a-Sim, gameplay scenarios, terrain manipulation tools, "Neighborhood Stories" gameplay storytelling system, a "wants and fears" goal system, newborn and infant Sim life stages, and polyamory. It was noted by some reviewers that some features added in free updates required DLC packs, such as newborns and infants in Growing Together, to be fully fleshed out. Content and feature updates continue to be developed for the game, as of 2026.

EA affirmed their commitment to long-term support of the game in 2021, citing a "shift across the entire games industry to support and nurture our communities long-term". In IGN's re-evaluation of the game in 2024, Sarah Thwaites praised The Sims 4 as "maintaining the bar for life simulators", and highlighted the game's strong community support. Following growing criticism of bugs and instability in the game, Maxis "assembled a team" in 2024 to focus on more frequent bug fix updates, as well as better performance.

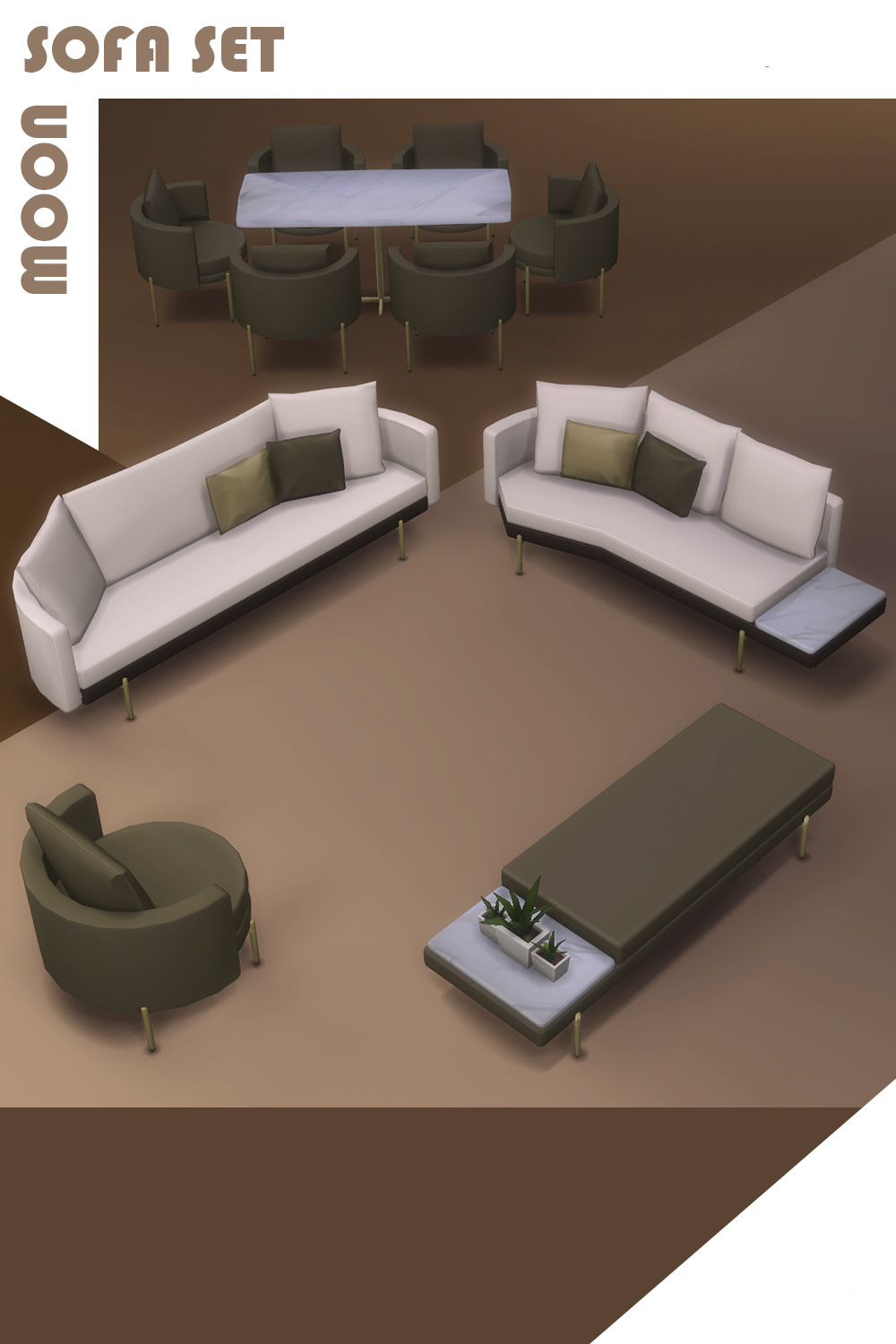
An example of player-designed custom content for the game

Maxis announced a partnership with mod distribution platform CurseForge in 2022 to provide an official distribution method for The Sims 4 mods and custom content.

EA announced in September 2022 that The Sims 4 base game would become free-to-play on all platforms, starting from October 18, 2022. This makes The Sims 4 the fourth free-to-play entry in the series, following The Sims Social, The Sims FreePlay, and The Sims Mobile. For a limited time, existing players who had previously purchased the game were entitled to a free copy of the Desert Luxe Kit, a DLC pack containing a small variety of furniture and Build mode items.

Maxis also revealed in the October 2022 livestream that a new title in The Sims series is in development, under the working title of "Project Rene", and showed footage of potential game functions, such as co-op multiplayer in Build mode and cross-compatibility with desktop and mobile platforms. Multiplayer is expected to be a core feature of the game. "Project Rene" is set to be a free-to-play title, and is not intended to be a direct successor to The Sims 4. In July 2025, EA president Laura Miele stated that "Project Rene" would be developed in parallel with continued updates for The Sims 4, and cited the large number of existing DLC packs as the reason a direct sequel is not in development.

In September 2025, a consortium of investors proposed a leveraged buyout of EA. The consortium included the Public Investment Fund of Saudi Arabia and Affinity Partners, an investment firm founded by Jared Kushner, the son-in-law of U.S. president Donald Trump. The proposal drew criticism from some content creators within the Sims community, who expressed concerns that the franchise's emphasis on inclusivity could be affected, citing the Saudi government's record on LGBTQ rights and conservative positions on LGBTQ issues within the Republican Party. Several content creators for The Sims 4, including Kayla Sims, James Turner, and Jesse McNamara, subsequently left EA's creator program. In a statement published in January 2026, Maxis stated that the game's values and creative control would remain "unchanged", and its focus on inclusivity would not be affected by the proposed buyout.

On March 3, 2026, Maxis announced that an in-game marketplace for custom content would be introduced to the game for fans to purchase through a new in-game currency named "Moola", and that all Kits would shift to being sold exclusively for Moola through the marketplace from March 17. Creator-made items, sold as "Maker Packs", cannot be offered for free through the marketplace, and creators receive approximately 30% of the revenue. The announcement resulted in further backlash from fans and content creators, who accused EA of predatory monetization. In response to the backlash, Maxis offered the Country Kitchen Kit as a free in-game kit through the marketplace. Amid continued backlash from fans, Maxis reinstated Kits for purchase on EA App and Steam for PC/Mac players on April 16, 2026, while simultaneously moving Kits exclusively to the marketplace for console players, adding that the Country Kitchen Kit would remain free to claim in-game through the marketplace until May 29, 2026.

== Downloadable content packs ==
Since 2015, paid DLC packs have been released for The Sims 4, divided into four pack categories: "expansion packs", "game packs", "stuff packs", and "kits". Expansion packs are the largest packs, introducing major new features centered on a specified theme. Game packs are similar, but include a smaller amount of content. Stuff packs are minor packs containing only a small number of furniture and clothing items. Kits are the smallest, each focusing exclusively on either new furniture or clothing. According to Metacritic, expansion packs and game packs have received reviews ranging from "generally favorable" to "mixed or average".

=== Expansion packs ===
| Name | Release date / pack summary |
|---|---|
| Get to Work | PC: NA: March 31, 2015; EU: April 2, 2015; Console: WW: March 20, 2018 |
| Get to Work | Adds new career paths like detective, doctor, scientist, and retail business ownership. New world: Magnolia Promenade |
| Get Together | PC: NA: December 8, 2015; EU: December 10, 2015; Console: WW: September 11, 2018 |
| Get Together | Introduces clubs with customizable rules and activities, a European-inspired world to explore, and community events for Sims to attend. New world: Windenburg |
| City Living | PC: NA: November 1, 2016; EU: November 3, 2016; Console: WW: November 14, 2017 |
| City Living | Offers high-rise apartment living in a diverse, bustling city with vibrant festivals. New world: San Myshuno |
| Cats & Dogs | PC: WW: November 10, 2017; Console: WW: July 31, 2018 |
| Cats & Dogs | Integrates cats and dogs into Sims' lives, with the option to pursue a veterinarian career. New world: Brindleton Bay |
| Seasons | PC: WW: June 22, 2018; Console: WW: November 13, 2018 |
| Seasons | Introduces seasons and weather effects like rain and snow, and seasonal holidays. |
| Get Famous | PC: WW: November 16, 2018; Console: WW: February 12, 2019 |
| Get Famous | Provides options for Sims to pursue acting careers, become social media stars, and experience the celebrity lifestyle. New world: Del Sol Valley |
| Island Living | PC: WW: June 21, 2019; Console: WW: July 16, 2019 |
| Island Living | Allows Sims to live off-the-grid in a tropical world, featuring island life elements and environmental considerations. New world: Sulani |
| Discover University | PC: WW: November 15, 2019; Console: WW: December 17, 2019 |
| Discover University | Enables Sims to attend college, choose their major, experience campus life, and earn degrees that impact their careers. New world: Britechester |
| Eco Lifestyle | WW: June 5, 2020 |
| Eco Lifestyle | Encourages sustainable living through crafting eco-friendly items and influencing the environmental state of the neighborhood. New world: Evergreen Harbor |
| Snowy Escape | WW: November 13, 2020 |
| Snowy Escape | Offers winter sports activities in a new Japan-inspired world, allowing Sims to explore the local culture. New world: Mt. Komorebi |
| Cottage Living | WW: July 22, 2021 |
| Cottage Living | Introduces a simpler lifestyle in the countryside, with opportunities for Sims to grow food, raise farm animals, and participate in village activities. New world: Henford-on-Bagley |
| High School Years | WW: July 28, 2022 |
| High School Years | Focuses on the teenage experiences of high school, including after-school activities, teen romance, and emotional complexities. New world: Copperdale |
| Growing Together | WW: March 16, 2023 |
| Growing Together | Focuses on family dynamics, rearing children, multi-generational gameplay, and expands gameplay options for the new infant Sim life stage. New world: San Sequoia |
| Horse Ranch | WW: July 20, 2023 |
| Horse Ranch | Introduces horses as pets or companions, with gameplay around horse care, riding, and competitions, in a Southwestern United States-based world. New world: Chestnut Ridge |
| For Rent | WW: December 7, 2023 |
| For Rent | Introduces a rental housing system, allowing Sims to manage rental properties or rent homes, in a Southeast Asian-inspired world. New world: Tomarang |
| Lovestruck | WW: July 25, 2024 |
| Lovestruck | Focuses on romantic relationships, with new social interactions and date activities, in a Mexico City-inspired world. New world: Ciudad Enamorada |
| Life & Death | WW: October 31, 2024 |
| Life & Death | Adds gameplay options related to Sim deaths and afterlife, and pursue a Grim Reaper career. New world: Ravenwood |
| Businesses & Hobbies | WW: March 6, 2025 |
| Businesses & Hobbies | Introduces the ability to run small businesses that based on Sims' skills and interests, and adds new skills such as tattooing and pottery. New world: Nordhaven |
| Enchanted by Nature | WW: July 10, 2025 |
| Enchanted by Nature | Introduces a nature-centric and magical gameplay experience to The Sims 4. The pack primarily focuses on a free-spirited lifestyle, the introduction of fairies. New world: Innisgreen |
| Adventure Awaits | WW: October 2, 2025 |
| Adventure Awaits | Introduces a Getaway Planner system that lets Sims schedule and customise trips. The pack also expands childhood gameplay with new activities, traits, and playground options, focusing on exploration, creativity, and family adventures. New world: Gibbi Point |
| Royalty & Legacy | WW: February 12, 2026 |
| Royalty & Legacy | Introduces gameplay centred on noble families and dynastic legacy, allowing players to build prestige, manage unity within a dynasty, and navigate scandals and social status in a royal-themed setting. New world: Ondarion |

=== Game packs ===
| Name | Release date / pack summary |
|---|---|
| Outdoor Retreat | PC: WW: January 13, 2015; Console: WW: December 4, 2018 |
| Outdoor Retreat | Provides opportunities for Sims to explore wilderness areas, go camping, hike, and connect with nature, in a new rustic world. New world: Granite Falls |
| Spa Day | PC: WW: July 14, 2015; Console: WW: April 18, 2019 |
| Spa Day | Offers a luxurious spa experience for Sims, with treatments focused on well-being. |
| Dine Out | PC: WW: June 7, 2016; Console: WW: January 8, 2018 |
| Dine Out | Allows Sims to own and manage restaurants, experience various new foods, and enjoy dining out. |
| Vampires | PC: WW: January 24, 2017; Console: WW: November 14, 2017 |
| Vampires | Introduces the option for Sims to become vampires and develop supernatural abilities. New world: Forgotten Hollow |
| Parenthood | PC: WW: May 30, 2017; Console: WW: June 19, 2018 |
| Parenthood | Expands on the experience of raising a family, offering new gameplay features for different life stages, and additional challenges of parenting. |
| Jungle Adventure | PC: WW: February 27, 2018; Console: WW: December 4, 2018 |
| Jungle Adventure | Sims can visit a Latin American-inspired jungle world to explore ruins, uncover artifacts, and learn about local cultures. New world: Selvadorada |
| StrangerVille | PC: WW: February 26, 2019; Console: WW: May 14, 2019 |
| StrangerVille | Includes a new world featuring a mystery-themed campaign, and an unlockable military career path. New world: StrangerVille |
| Realm of Magic | PC: WW: September 10, 2019; Console: WW: October 15, 2019 |
| Realm of Magic | Allows Sims to become spellcasters, learn spells, brew potions, and live in a world filled with magic. New world: Glimmerbrook |
| Star Wars: Journey to Batuu | WW: September 8, 2020 |
| Star Wars: Journey to Batuu | Visit Batuu, a Star Wars-themed world. Complete a campaign, and unlock items from the franchise. Notable Star Wars characters such as Rey and Kylo Ren are included. New world: Batuu |
| Dream Home Decorator | WW: June 1, 2021 |
| Dream Home Decorator | Introduces an interior design career, allowing Sims to renovate and style homes with new furniture and design options. |
| My Wedding Stories | WW: February 23, 2022 |
| My Wedding Stories | Introduces wedding planning gameplay, including customizing details, choose traditions, hire vendors, and experience potential mishaps. New world: Tartosa |
| Werewolves | WW: June 16, 2022 |
| Werewolves | Allows Sims to transform into werewolves, explore werewolf lore, join packs, and experience wild aspects of their nature. New world: Moonwood Mill |

=== Criticism ===
Star Wars: Journey to Batuu, the ninth game pack for The Sims 4, was announced on August 27, 2020. The announcement was met with negative reception from players, who felt it overlooked community-requested features and content; some speculated it was a contractual obligation given EA's ownership of the Star Wars video game franchise. Prior to the pack's announcement, an independent poll by Digital Spy asked players which themes they would like to see in future The Sims 4 content packs; Star Wars ranked last out of twenty-one possible choices. In response to the backlash, Maxis shared development updates on selected community-requested features and upcoming content, assuring that they were not impacted by development of the pack, but acknowledged encountering "foundational technology" issues in developing these features.

My Wedding Stories, the eleventh game pack for The Sims 4, was announced on February 8, 2022. The following day, Maxis announced that the pack would not be released in Russia, citing Russian video game laws prohibiting content that promotes homosexuality as a societal norm. Following strong backlash and feedback from Russian players, Maxis reversed their decision, stating that they "reassessed their options", and Russia was included in the pack's worldwide release on February 23, 2022, without any content alterations. However, since March 4, 2022, EA has suspended all video game sales in Russia due to the ongoing Russian invasion of Ukraine. Following the release of My Wedding Stories, it received additional criticism from players and reviewers for its numerous bugs and glitches, including significant glitches rendering the game's headline wedding event feature unplayable. The pack received an aggregate critic score of 62% on Metacritic, the lowest for a The Sims 4 game pack to date. An update released on March 31, 2022, addressed some of these glitches.
