= Hero Esports =

Chinese esports company

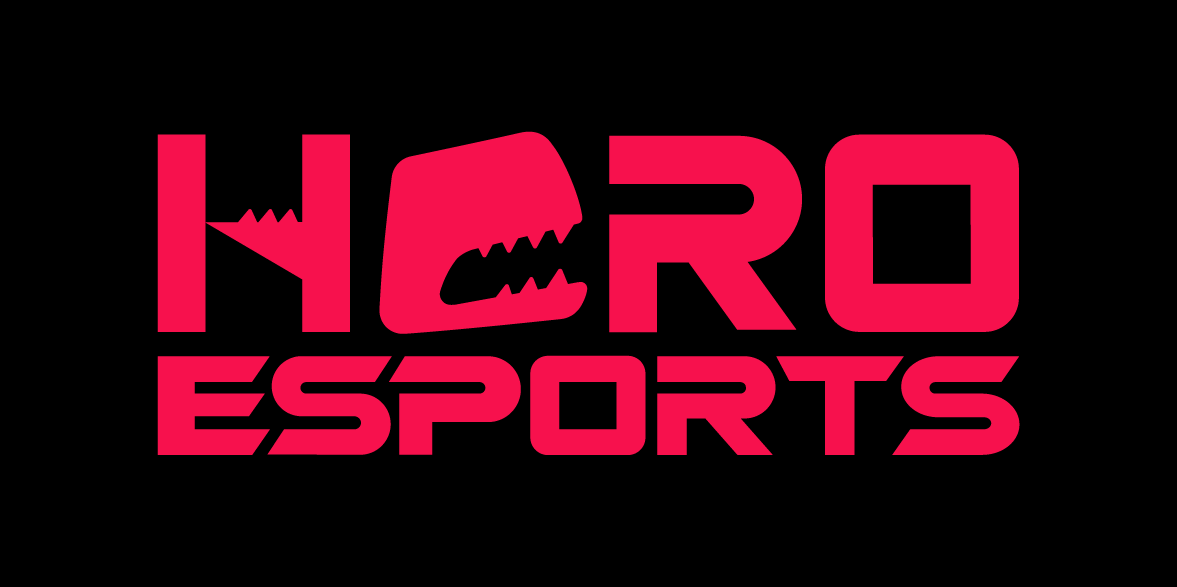
- Type: Private
- Industry: Esports
- Headquarters: Shanghai, China
- Key people: Dino Ying, Executive Chairman; Danny Tang, CEO; Ethan Teng, President
- Number of employees: 1200

Hero Esports is a Chinese esports organisation founded in 2016, led by entrepreneur Dino Ying and Danny Tang. The company specializes in tournament organisation, esports marketing solutions, and esports community development.

Hero Esports was originally known as VSPN (Versus Programming Network), then VSPO; and rebranded alongside a corporate restructure in November 2024. Co-founder and original CEO Dino Ying moved to the role of Executive Chairman; co-founder and former CFO Danny Tang is now CEO.

Ying's move enabled further focus on the next generation of esports - such as the Hero Esports Asian Champions League, and supporting the development of the Olympic Esports Games and Esports World Cup. He was named a member of the Asian Games Esports taskforce in July 2024; and was already elected as a member of the OCA’s first Esports and E Martial Art Committee.

The company has 12 office locations, in Shanghai, Chengdu, Xi'an, Shenzen, Beijing (China); Seoul (South Korea); Kuala Lumpur (Malaysia); and Dubai (UAE). It operates three esports venues and arenas - two in Shanghai (the Hero Esports Shanghai Esports Arena and INS Renaissance) and one in Chengdu (the Hero Esports Chengdu Esports Arena). Investors in Hero Esports include Savvy Games Group and Tencent; and strategic partners such as Kuaishou and streaming service Huya Live. Hero Esports is a member of the Esports Integrity Commission (ESIC).

== Events ==
Since its inception, Hero Esports has grown to produce over 7000 matches every year and has reached an online fanbase of over 800 million, and by 2025 stood as the largest esports company in Asia, realising the Chinese state's ambition to lead in the $2billion industry.

Hero Esports first managed and produced an esports event in September 2016, with the King Pro League Fall 2016; followed by the PUBG China Pro Invitational 2018 (May 2018); and PUBG Mobile Star Challenge 2018 (November 2018).

Hero Esports's portfolio of leagues and tournaments include titles such as League of Legends and PlayerUnknown's Battlegrounds, and cover over 80% of the esports titles on the market. Additionally, Hero Esports has collaborated with major game publishers like Tencent and Krafton to organise esports leagues, including Honor of Kings' KPL series and PUBG's PGC series. The 2025 Honor of Kings live China championship set a Guinness World Record with 62,000 attendees in Beijing's Bird's Nest stadium.

== Olympic and Asian Games ==
Hero Esports has been involved in producing esports events for international competitions, including the Olympic Esports Week and esports series at the Jakarta Asian Games (2018) and the Hangzhou Asian Games (2022).

The Hero Esports Asian Champions League tournament series was launched in 2025, organised by Hero Esports as one of Asia's largest multi-genre mobile esports competition. Initial estimates of the live audience for the tournament finale exceeded 16,000,000 globally.
