= List of mergers and acquisitions by Advania =

Advania was formed in 2012 through the merger of several IT companies in Iceland, Sweden, and Norway, with roots dating back to the 20th century. Before the formation of Advania, each country branch had evolved over time, with some expanding through mergers and acquisitions.

Date	Company	Business	Country	References
18 November 2009	Eskill	Software development	Iceland	
18 November 2009	Kögun	Software development	Iceland	
18 November 2009	Landsteinar Strengur	Software development and retail	Iceland	
The three companies merged into Skýrr hf. Landsteinar Strengur had come to be when two companies, Landsteinar and Strengur respectively, merged. The three companies had been subsidiaries of Teymi.
19 November 2010	EJS	Computer and software retail	Iceland	
EJS had sold 58% of its shares to Skýrr. It merged into Skýrr hf on 19 November 2010. EJS had 190 employees and Skýrr hf 470 at the time of the merger.
16 November 2011	THOR Data Center	Data centre	Iceland	
Skýrr acquired THOR Data Center, the first data centre built in Iceland.
20 January 2012	Aston Baltic	Software retail	Latvia	
20 January 2012	Hands AS	Software development and retail	Norway	
20 January 2012	HugurAx ehf	Software development and retail	Iceland	
20 January 2012	Kerfi AB	Software development and retail	Sweden	
20 January 2012	Skýrr hf	Software development and retail	Iceland	
All 5 companies merged and became Advania hf.

== Acquisitions ==
Since its formation, Advania has acquired several companies across Northern Europe:

Year	Company	Country
2015	Knowledge Factory	Sweden
2015	Tölvumiðlun	Iceland
2017	CAPERIO	Sweden
2018	Embla Solutions ehf.	Iceland
2018	STEPPER/NO	Norway
2019	Vintor	Finland
2019	Itello	Norway
2020	Accountor ICT Oy	Finland
2020	Kompetera	Denmark
2021	Hi5	Sweden
2021	Genia	Denmark
2021	Beveric	Finland
2021	Visolit	Norway, Sweden
2022	Content+Cloud	UK
2022	Painkiller	Noregur
2022	Azzure IT	UK
2022	eXspend	Norway
2022	Valtti	Finland
2022	3StepIT (Carve-Out)	Finland
2022	Cloudio	Denmark
2023	Edutukku Oy	Finland
2023	Core Services	Finland
2023	RTS Group AB	Sweden
2024	FixForum Oy (50%)	Finland
2024	Solv AS (Remaining 47%)	Norway
2024	Servium Limited	UK
2024	CCS Media	UK
2025	Visuell Teknik	Sweden
