= List of companies consolidated into American Bridge Company =

Companies consolidated into American Bridge Company
| # | Company name | Headquarters |
|---|---|---|
| 1 | Keystone Bridge Company | Pittsburgh, Pennsylvania |
| 2 | Wrought Iron Bridge Company | Canton, Ohio |
| 3 | Berlin Iron Bridge Company | Berlin, Connecticut |
| 4 | Pencoyd Iron Works | Philadelphia, Pennsylvania |
| 5 | Union Bridge Company | Athens, Pennsylvania |
| 6 | Groton Bridge Company | Groton, New York |
| 7 | Pittsburgh Bridge Company | Pittsburgh, Pennsylvania |
| 8 | Youngstown Bridge Company | Youngstown, Ohio |
| 9 | Carnegie Company | Pittsburgh, Pennsylvania |
| 10 | Post & McCord | Brooklyn, New York |
| 11 | J.B. & J.M. Cornell | Cornell, New York |
| 12 | Elmira Bridge Company, Limited | Elmira, New York |
| 13 | American Bridge Works | Chicago, Illinois |
| 14 | Edgemoor Bridge Works | Edgemoor, Delaware |
| 15 | Lessig Bridge and Iron Works | Chicago, Illinois |
| 16 | Shiffler Bridge Company | Pittsburgh, Pennsylvania |
| 17 | Detroit Bridge and Iron Company | Detroit, Michigan |
| 18 | Rochester Bridge and Iron Works | Rochester, New York |
| 19 | J.G. Wagner and Co. | Milwaukee, Wisconsin |
| 20 | Toledo Bridge Company | Toledo, Ohio |
| 21 | Gilette & Herzog Manufactering Company | Minneapolis, Minnesota |
| 22 | Lafayette Bridge Company | Pittsburgh, Pennsylvania |
| 23 | Schultz Bridge and Iron Company | Pittsburgh, Pennsylvania |
| 24 | Buffalo Bridge and Iron Works | Buffalo, New York |
| 25 | Canton Bridge Company | Canton, Ohio |
| 26 | Bellefonte Bridge and Iron Company | Bellefonte, Pennsylvania |
| 27 | Coke and Iron Works | St. Louis, Missouri |
| 28 | Hilton Bridge and Construction Company | Albany, New York |
| 29 | Horseheads Bridge Company | Horseheads, New York |
| 30 | Columbia Bridge Company, Successors to Columbia Bridge Works of Dayton, OH | Pittsburgh, Pennsylvania |
