= Peak Games =

Mobile gaming company based in Istanbul, Turkey

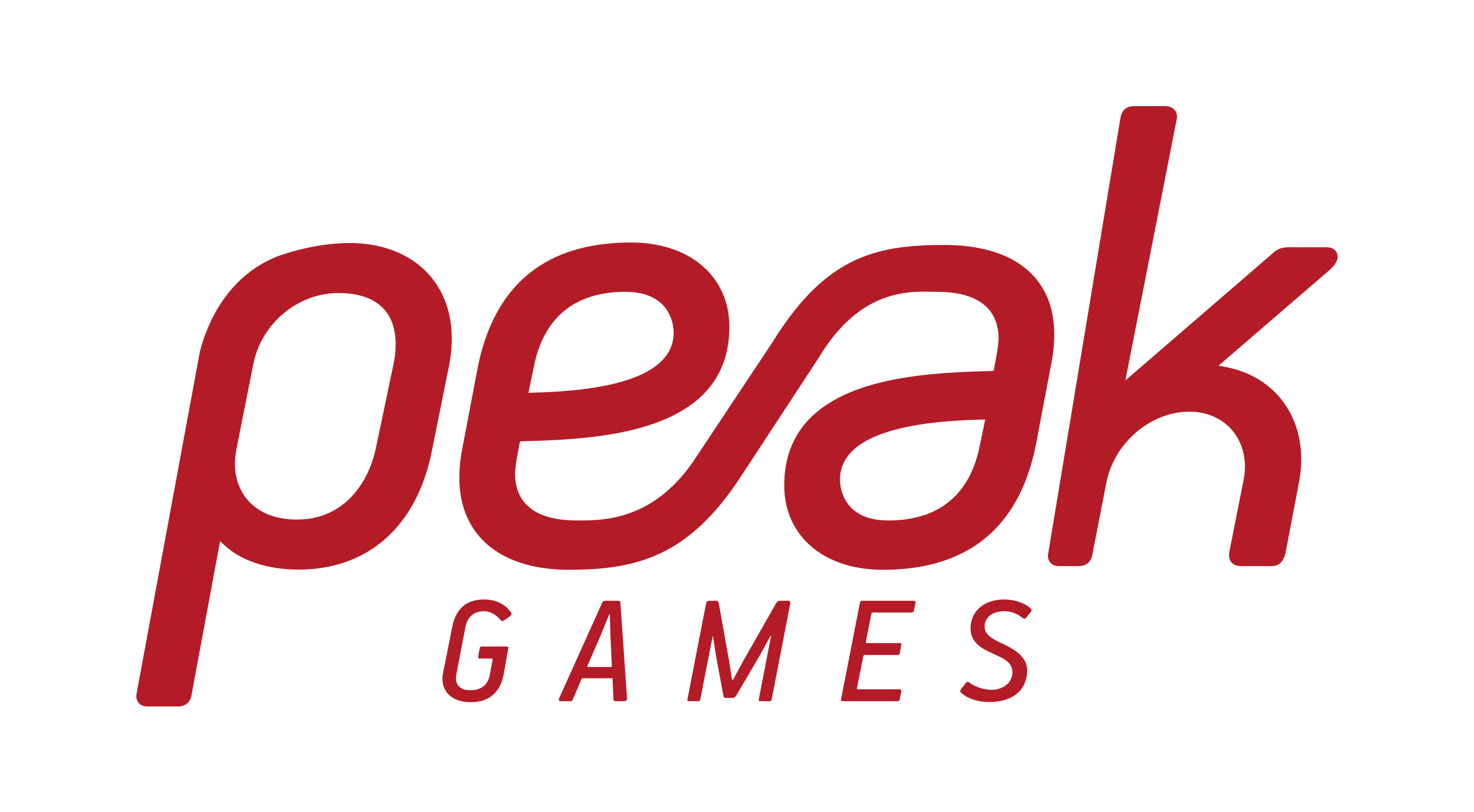
- Type: Subsidiary
- Industry: Mobile games
- Founded: 2010
- Founder: Sidar Şahin, Safa Sofuoğlu
- Headquarters: Istanbul, Turkey
- Area served: Worldwide
- Products: Toy Blast, Toon Blast
- Owner: Take-Two Interactive
- Parent: Zynga
- Website: https://peak.com/

Peak Games is a mobile gaming company based in Istanbul, Turkey. The privately held company was acquired by Zynga in June 2020 for $1.8 billion. The company launched the games Toy Blast in 2015 and Toon Blast in 2017, both collectively have more than 12 million average mobile daily active users as of June 2020.

== History and overview ==
Peak Games was founded by Sidar Şahin, Safa Sofuoğlu, Demet Mutlu, and Evren Üçok in October 2010. The company was founded as a mobile technology company that designed and developed casual puzzle games for Android and iOS platforms. In 2017, Peak Games sold its mobile card games to Zynga for a reported $100 million. The acquisition included card games Spades Plus, Gin Rummy Plus and Okey Plus.

According to a Harvard Business School case study, Peak Games was Europe’s third biggest grossing online gaming company with an audience of over 350 million users worldwide as of 2018.

The company was backed by venture capital with a total funding of $18 million. It was acquired by American social game developer, Zynga in a cash and share deal worth $1.8 billion in June 2020. After the acquisition, Peak Games operates independently with its 100 employees.

== Games developed ==
Peak Games have designed and developed notable mobile games.

- Toy Blast (launched 2015)
- Toon Blast (launched 2017)
- Lost Bubble (launched 2013)
- Lost Jewels (launched 2012)
- Match Factory! (launched 2023)
