= Savvy Games Group =

Saudi video game company

- Logo since 2024
- Native name: مجموعة سافي للألعاب الإلكترونية
- Type: Private
- Industry: Video games
- Founded: November 2021; 5 years ago
- Headquarters: Riyadh, Saudi Arabia
- Number of locations: 29 (2026)
- Key people: Brian Ward (CEO)
- Products: Monopoly Go!; Pokémon Go; Pikmin Bloom; Monster Hunter Now; Grunt Rush
- Number of employees: 3,500 (2026)
- Parent: Public Investment Fund
- Subsidiaries: Scopely; ESL; Steer Studios; FACEIT; Moonton
- Website: savvygames.com

Savvy Games Group (Note: Arabic: مجموعة سافي للألعاب الإلكترونية (romanized: Majmūʿat Sāfī lil-Alʿāb al-Iliktirūniyyah)) is a Saudi Arabian video game investment, development, publishing, and Esports holding company headquartered in Riyadh. The company is the video game division of the Public Investment Fund of Saudi Arabia, created to support the development of the domestic gaming sector and to invest in the global video game industry.

== History ==
Savvy Games Group was established in 2021 by Saudi Arabia's Public Investment Fund (PIF) as part of a broader goal of diversifying the Saudi economy and growing the Saudi video game industry.

In 2021, the PIF directly acquired shares in three American video game firms, Electronic Arts, Take-Two Interactive, and Activision Blizzard. In 2022, the PIF took a 5% stake in Nintendo.

Savvy Games Group invested $1 billion to buy an 8% interest in Embracer Group in May 2022.

On September 29, 2022, Savvy Games Group announced plans to invest $37.8 billion in the video game industry, allocating $13.3 billion for the acquisition and expansion of a prominent video game developers and publishers with the aim of establishing them as a crucial development partner, thus positioning the country as a global gaming hub by 2030. The initiative includes strategic acquisitions, job creation, and GDP growth objectives. The investment entails acquiring minority stakes in leading game publishers and partnering with established industry players to bolster the gaming ecosystem. The initiative aims to create 39,000 jobs, establish 250 gaming companies, and contribute 50 billion riyals to the Saudi GDP, fostering economic diversification and growth.

=== Scopely acquisition ===
On April 5, 2023, Savvy Games Group announced its intent to acquire American mobile video game developer and publisher Scopely for $4.9 billion. The acquisition was completed on July 13, 2023.

Embracer Group, renowned for its acquisition of numerous game studios, recently disclosed a major partnership valued at over $2 billion that unexpectedly fell through at the final hour. The identity of the partner was shrouded in mystery until later. In August 2023, it was unveiled that the elusive partner was Savvy Games Group. This failed collaboration dealt a significant blow to Embracer, resulting in a sharp drop in their stock price and necessitating cost-cutting measures such as layoffs and studio closures. Embracer Group has announced plans for a substantial company restructuring, which includes studio closures, employee layoffs, and the cancellation of numerous video game projects. The reasons behind the dissolution of the deal remain undisclosed, but prior to this development, Embracer CEO Lars Wingefors had faced criticism for accepting investment from Savvy, amid concerns regarding human rights violations attributed to the Saudi government. Despite the deal falling through, Savvy still holds its stake in Embracer.

On February 16, 2023, Savvy Games Group announced its investment of $235 million into Chinese esports company VSPO, (now Hero Esports) giving it a minority stake and making it VSPO's largest institutional shareholder.

In 2024, the PIF reduced its stake in Nintendo from 8.58% to 7.54%, though it remains one of Nintendo's largest shareholders. This move comes after earlier reports suggesting the PIF might increase its stake in Nintendo, which were later corrected to refer to Japanese gaming companies in general. The PIF initially acquired a 5.01% stake in Nintendo in May 2022, which had grown to 8.58% by mid-2024. The PIF has been actively investing in the video game industry as part of Crown Prince Mohammed bin Salman's strategy to diversify the Saudi economy beyond oil revenues.

=== Niantic acquisition ===
On February 18, 2025, Bloomberg reported that Savvy and Scopely were in talks to acquire the video game arm of the American company Niantic for $3.5 billion, including mobile games Pokémon GO and Pikmin Bloom.

On March 12, Savvy Games Group confirmed their intentions, and the deal was completed on May 29, 2025.

=== Moonton acquisition ===
On February 13, 2026, Reuters reported that Savvy Games Group is nearing a deal to acquire Chinese mobile game company Moonton from ByteDance for $7 billion. On March 21, 2026, Savvy Games Group announced its plan to acquire Moonton from ByteDance for $6 billion.

== Subsidiaries ==
Company	Location	Date	Ref(s).
ESL	Cologne, Germany	2022	
FACEIT	London, United Kingdom	2022	
Scopely	Culver City, California	2023	
Steer Studios	Riyadh, Saudi Arabia	2023	

== Stakes ==
Company	Location	Date	Note	Ref(s).
Embracer Group	Karlstad, Sweden	2022	Minority stake (8.3%; approx. US$1.0 billion)	
Nintendo	Kyoto, Japan	2022	Minority stake (7.54%)	
Hero Esports	Shanghai, China	2023	Strategic minority stake (30%; approx. US$265 million)	
Take-Two Interactive	New York, US	2026	Minority stake (5.94%; approx. US$3.0 billion)	
