= Mutato Muzika =

American music production company

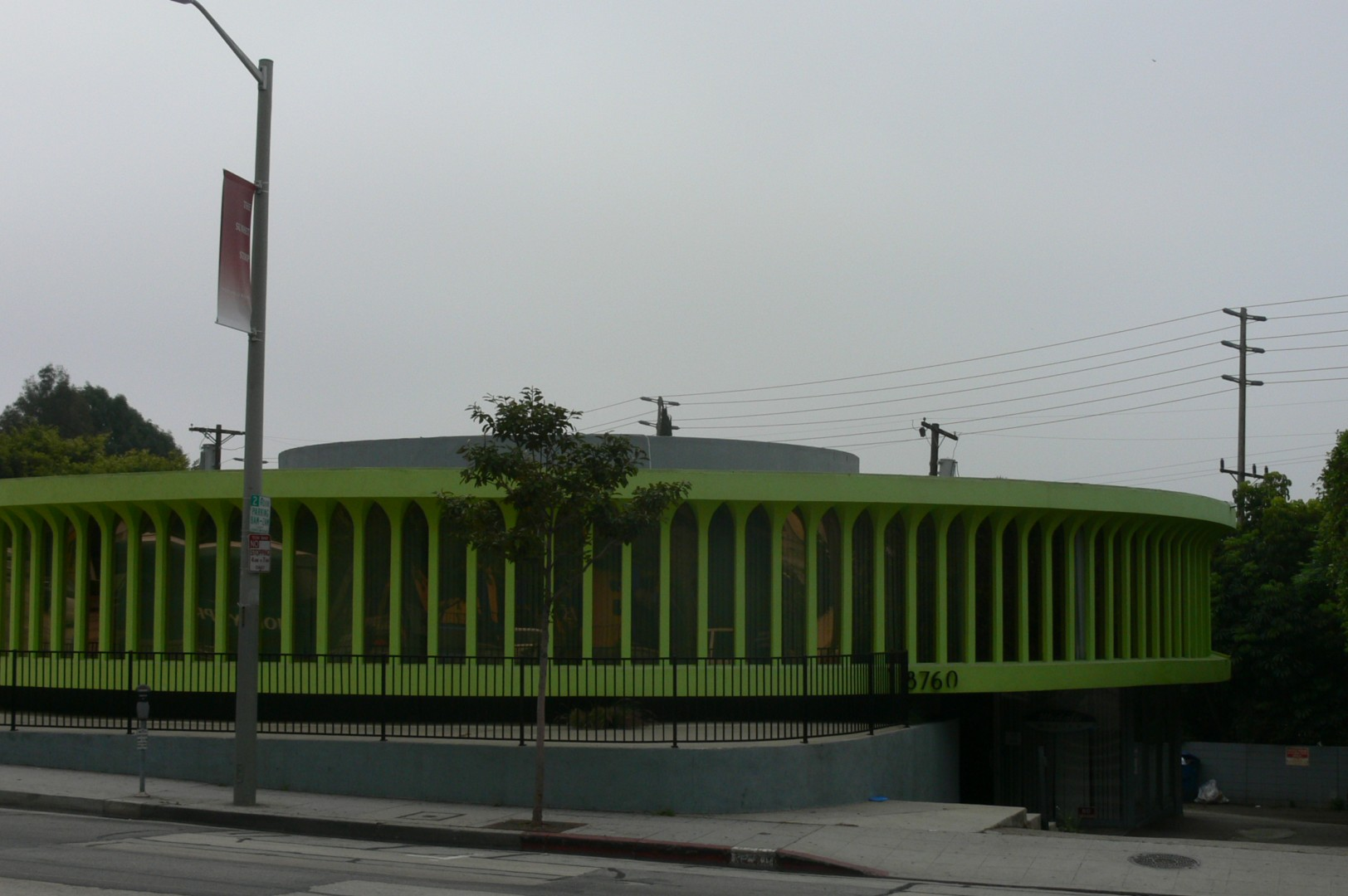
- Type: Corporation
- Industry: Music production company
- Genre: Film score; video game; new wave; electronic rock
- Founded: 1989; 37 years ago
- Founders: Mark Mothersbaugh
- Headquarters: Los Angeles, California, United States
- Key people: Mark Mothersbaugh; Songwriter/Producer
- Services: Music Production; Music Composition
- Owner: Mark Mothersbaugh
- Website: markmothersbaugh.com/pages/info

Mutato Muzika is an American music production company established and owned by Devo co-founder and lead singer Mark Mothersbaugh in 1989. The name is a portmanteau of the words mutant and potato, a reference to Mothersbaugh's longstanding fascination with mutants and mutation, and to Devo fans, whom the band dubbed "spuds," early on.

While Devo members Mark Mothersbaugh, Gerald Casale and Bob Mothersbaugh, with drummer Josh Freese, often meet, rehearse and confer in its West Hollywood, California studio facilities, Mutato Muzika is a full-service music production company. Until his death in 2014, Bob Casale served as a producer/engineer there.

Mutato Muzika has produced music for many films, including Rushmore, The Royal Tenenbaums, The Life Aquatic with Steve Zissou, Confessions of a Teenage Drama Queen, 13, Lords of Dogtown, Nick & Norah's Infinite Playlist, Cloudy with a Chance of Meatballs, and Catfish. Television music includes Rugrats, Shaggy & Scooby-Doo Get a Clue!, Pee-wee's Playhouse, Big Love, Eureka, Shameless, Enlightened and Regular Show. Mutato Muzika-produced video game scores include Crash Bandicoot and The Sims. Mutato Muzika also provides music for commercials, including spots for Apple's PC vs. Mac, Martini & Rossi's George Clooney/Giorgio, Apartments.com, and others.

== Architecture ==
The company is housed in a round bright green building at 8760 West Sunset Boulevard. Previously known as "The Beauty Pavilion", it was built in 1967 for plastic surgeon Dr. Robert Alan Franklyn, who wanted the roof to have skylights in order to illuminate the operating room in the center of the structure. The building was designed by Brazilian architect Oscar Niemeyer, whose work Franklyn had known about for years. Although no architect's name is listed on the building permit, the Oscar Niemeyer Foundation in Rio de Janeiro, Brazil contains a number of his sketches for the two-story clinic, known as the “Centro de Beleza”. In 1964, Niemeyer had been a Communist activist, which caused him to be banned from Brazil; he was also denied entrance to the U.S. in the same year. Working from Paris through California architects by mail, he completed two projects - a house for Anne and Joseph Strick in Santa Monica, and the Beauty Pavillion for Dr. Franklyn.

The building was painted green after Mothersbaugh took ownership of it.

== Personnel ==
- Mark Mothersbaugh – composer, songwriter, vocalist, founder
- John Enroth – associate composer
- Albert Fox – associate composer
- Siena Goldman – art assistant
- Seth Horan – lead audio engineer
- Arthur Sadler – office coordinator
- Tiffany Siripat – studio manager

== Productions ==
=== Films ===
Mutato Muzika has received credit for recordings in the following films:

- The Lego Ninjago Movie
- The Lego Movie
- Pee-wee's Big Holiday
- Hotel Transylvania
- Hotel Transylvania 2
- Hotel Transylvania 3: Summer Vacation
- Hotel Transylvania: Transformania
- Vacation
- Pitch Perfect 2
- 22 Jump Street
- Cloudy with a Chance of Meatballs 2
- Safe
- What to Expect When You're Expecting
- 21 Jump Street
- Moonrise Kingdom
- The Royal Tenenbaums
- The Rugrats Movie
- Rugrats in Paris: The Movie
- Rugrats Go Wild

- The Adventures of Rocky and Bullwinkle
- Drop Dead Gorgeous
- Mystery Men
- It's the Rage
- Rushmore
- 200 Cigarettes
- Dead Man on Campus
- Best Men
- Sorority Boys
- Bottle Rocket
- The Last Supper
- Cloudy with a Chance of Meatballs
- Happy Gilmore

- Four Rooms
- Thirteen
- The New Age
- The Life Aquatic with Steve Zissou
- The Big Squeeze
- Breaking Up
- Flesh Suitcase
- Down on the Waterfront
- It's Pat
- Welcome to Collinwood
- Catfish
- Saving Private Perez
- Born to Be Wild
- Thor: Ragnarok
- The Croods: A New Age
- Cocaine Bear
- Vacation Friends 2
- A Minecraft Movie
- Hoppers

=== Television ===
Mutato Muzika has received credit for recordings in the following television programs:

- The Carrie Diaries
- House of Lies
- Enlightened
- Clifford the Big Red Dog
- Dawson's Creek
- Can of Worms
- The Mr. Potato Head Show
- Rugrats
- Working
- Quicksilver Highway
- Principal Takes a Holiday
- Last Rites
- Fired Up
- Life's Work
- Strange Luck
- Liquid Television
- Pee-wee's Playhouse

- Santo Bugito
- Bakersfield P.D.
- Sliders
- Future Quest
- A.J.'s Time Travelers
- Beakman's World
- Adventures in Wonderland
- If Not for You
- Too Something
- Medicine Ball
- Street Match
- Second Chances
- Edith Ann
- South Beach
- Mann & Machine
- Davis Rules
- Will Vinton Easter Special

- Great Scott!
- Felix the Cat
- Hotel Malibu
- Greg the Bunny
- Muscle
- The Wacky Adventures of Ronald McDonald
- Hidden Hills
- The Mind of the Married Man
- Stinky Pierre
- You Animal
- MD's
- Eureka
- Shaggy & Scooby-Doo Get a Clue!
- Shameless
- Blue Mountain State
- Regular Show
- Disenchantment
- Summer Camp Island
- Close Enough
- Rugrats (2021 revival)

=== Video games ===
- Interstate '82 - Josh Mancell
- The Sims 2 - Mark Mothersbaugh
- Crash Bandicoot - Josh Mancell
- Crash Bandicoot 2: Cortex Strikes Back - Josh Mancell
- Crash Bandicoot 3: Warped - Josh Mancell
- Crash Team Racing - Josh Mancell
- Jak and Daxter: The Precursor Legacy - Josh Mancell
- Jak II - Josh Mancell
- Jak 3 - Josh Mancell
- Boom Blox - Mark Mothersbaugh, Albert Fox, John Enroth and Silas Hite
- MySims
- MySims Kingdom
- MySims Racing
- MySims Agents
- The Lego Movie Videogame - Mark Mothersbaugh
