= MySims Kingdom =

2008 video game

- Developers: EA Redwood Shores (Wii); TOSE (Nintendo DS)
- Publisher: Electronic Arts
- Series: The Sims
- Engine: Havok (Wii)
- Platforms: Wii; Nintendo DS; Nintendo Switch; Microsoft Windows iOS macOS tvOS; PlayStation 5 Xbox Series X/S
- Release: DS, Wii: NA: October 28, 2008; EU: October 31, 2008; AU: November 6, 2008; Nintendo Switch: WW: November 19, 2024; Microsoft Windows: WW: March 18, 2025; Apple Arcade: WW: November 6, 2025; PlayStation 5, Xbox Series X/S: WW: November 18, 2025
- Genre: Life simulation
- Mode: Single-player

MySims Kingdom is a video game developed by EA Redwood Shores and published by Electronic Arts as a spin-off to Maxis' The Sims franchise for the Nintendo DS and Wii in 2008. MySims Kingdom is a follow-up to MySims, which was released in 2007 and was followed by MySims Party, MySims Racing, MySims Agents and MySims SkyHeroes.

MySims: Cozy Bundle, which contains MySims and MySims Kingdom, was released for Nintendo Switch on November 19, 2024 and released on Microsoft Windows via Steam and Epic Games Store on March 18, 2025. On November 6, 2025, the bundle was released on Apple Arcade and soon followed up with PlayStation 5 and Xbox Series X/S releases later on in the month on the 18th.

== Gameplay ==
=== Wii version ===
The Wii version of MySims Kingdom takes a departure from The Sims franchise and begins with a character living in a run-down kingdom with a king desperate to bring happiness back. The kingdom's Wandoliers, wand-equipped Sims that worked to keep the kingdom in order, have long since retired or moved away and it is up to the player to become the new Wandolier and restore order. The player's job is to rebuild, or remodel, homes and other structures for the characters using scrolls given to them by the islanders, and complete tasks that the islanders assign. Players must collect essences to unlock these scrolls and gain new items from them, and collect "mana" used to create furniture and structures and in return the player is given essences, scrolls, King Points (occasionally) and outfits for their Sim. As the kingdom's happiness increases, new islands are unlocked. To unlock more places, the player runs errands until they collect enough "King Points". A second set of missions are handed out before reaching the end of the game and achieving a special award.

Once the player has collected enough points to have reached King Points Level 5, they unlock the Reward Island which is an island at the top-left of the map for the player to build in as they please. On the Reward Island, the player is given the ability to place Figurines, Essences, and Flowers that have been collected throughout the game. Upon reaching King Points Level 5, the player can then also view the credits whenever they please. The end credits sequence features characters from the various islands dancing to an original song by composer Mark Mothersbaugh. Characters only appear in the end credit sequence if the player completed all of the tasks on their island. This means that the credits sequence can play out differently for different players, depending on how much of the game they completed.

Players can also interact with citizens by doing certain things with them, such as having a picnic. They can also customize characters using the outfits obtained as a reward for performing certain tasks. Some items in the game are interactive such as televisions, stoves, computers, video games, etc. Unlike other games in The Sims franchise, the player's Sim does not have needs or wants, although eating and sleep is optional.

In the Nintendo Wii version of MySims Kingdom, the Nunchuk is used for direct movement and the Wii Remote used for object moving and building. Players can also use the Wii Remote to go fishing at the fishing spot located around every island. Shaking the Wii Remote is used to chop down trees or go mining to gain different essences. Occasionally islanders will ask the player to explore the Kingdom collecting certain things such as fish, figurines and armor.

=== Nintendo DS ===
In the Nintendo DS version of MySims Kingdom, the player arrives at an island with a mysterious person making trees and houses vanish. The player's job is to stop this man and travel the whole of the Nintendo DS Kingdom to do this. This version of MySims Kingdom includes both characters from other MySims games and some unique to MySims Kingdom.

== Release ==
MySims Kingdom was released for the Wii and Nintendo DS on October 28, 2008.

On November 19, 2024, Electronic Arts released My Sims: Cozy Bundle on Nintendo Switch, featuring a high-definition version of MySims Kingdom. On March 18, 2025, it was released on EA Play, Steam, and the Epic Games Store. A subsequent update from Electronic Arts added compatibility with the Steam Deck. On November 6, 2025, MySims: Cozy Bundle was released on Apple Arcade and soon followed up with PlayStation 5 and Xbox Series X/S releases on November 18.

== Reception ==
Reception

Aggregate score
Aggregator	Score	
Aggregator	DS	Wii
Metacritic	58/100	76/100

Review scores
Publication	Score	
Publication	DS	Wii
1Up.com	D+	C−
Famitsu	27/40	29/40
GameDaily	N/A	8/10
GamesMaster	N/A	84%
GameSpot	5.5/10	7.5/10
GameZone	6/10	8/10
IGN	N/A	7.3/10
NGamer	N/A	84%
Nintendo Power	N/A	7.5/10
Official Nintendo Magazine	79%	85%
Common Sense Media	N/A	4/5

The Wii version received "generally favorable reviews", while the DS version received "mixed" reviews, according to the review aggregation website Metacritic. In Japan, where the Wii version was ported for release under the name Boku to Sim no Machi Kingdom (ぼくとシムのまち キングダム, Boku to Shimu no Machi Kingudamu) on October 30, 2008, followed by the DS version on December 4, 2008, Famitsu gave it a score of one seven, one eight, and two sevens for a total of 29 out of 40 for the former, and 27 out of 40 for the latter.

=== Sales ===
MySims Kingdom debuted at 25th on the United Kingdom physical sales chart for the week ending November 2, 2008. the game later ranked 22nd for the week ending November 9, 30th for the week ending November 16, 31st for the week ending November 23, and again 31st for the week ending November 30.

In the United States, MySims: Cozy Bundle was the 19th best-selling title in November 2024. The game also ranked as the 10th best-selling Nintendo Switch title for the period from January 5 to February 1, 2025.

In the United Kingdom, MySims: Cozy Bundle debuted at number 8 on the physical sales chart for the week ending November 23, 2024. In December, it ranked 25th for the week ending December 7, moved to 15th for the week of December 14, placed 20th for the week ending December 21, and ranked 23rd for the week ending December 28.In January 2025, MySims: Cozy Bundle was the 21st best-selling title for the week ending January 4, 25th for the week ending January 11, and 29th for the week ending January 18. In February, the game placed 17th for the week ending February 8, 20th for February 15, and 31st for February 22. In March, MySims: Cozy Bundle ranked 16th for the week ending March 15, 21st for the week ending March 21, and 24th for the week ending March 28. In April, the game placed 34th for the week ending April 19.

In February 2025, Electronic Arts CEO Andrew Wilson said MySims: Cozy Bundle had "performed well ahead of our expectations".

=== Awards ===
The Wii version was nominated for Best Simulation Game for the Wii by IGN in its 2008 video game awards.
