= The Sims 2: Seasons =

Expansion pack for The Sims 2

- Developer: Maxis
- Publishers: Electronic Arts (PC); Aspyr Media (Mac)
- Platforms: Microsoft Windows; Mac OS X
- Release: March 1, 2007

The Sims 2: Seasons is an expansion pack for the 2004 life simulation video game The Sims 2, developed by Maxis and published by Electronic Arts. The fifth expansion pack for the game, it was released March 1, 2007. Seasons introduces weather and seasons to the game, as well as new gameplay features such as gardening, fishing, and supernatural human-plant hybrids known as PlantSims.

Seasons adds a defined seasonal cycle and various weather effects to the game. This cycle affects Sims' moods, relationships, skills, and needs, as well as the environment and objects. The introduction of gardening and fishing allows Sims to grow plants, catch fish, and use them for cooking, selling, or decorating, adding new in-game income streams and expanding the range of talents a Sim can develop. Seasons is also the first expansion pack to introduce a new in-game neighborhood, Riverblossom Hills, which is themed as a countryside town; it has six occupied houses and several pre-made families and characters.

Though The Sims 2 was originally intended to include simulated weather during its development, unresolvable bugs resulted in these plan being shelved. Development for Seasons began in May 2006; it was reportedly a complex expansion to create. The soundtrack for Seasons featured real-world artists, particularly the British singer-songwriter Lily Allen, who became the first musician to release a music video made using the game's machinima functions.

Upon release, Seasons was a critical and commercial success. It was praised for its complex and intricate changes to The Sims 2's gameplay, juxtaposed with the more visible alterations of previous expansion packs. Seasons has served as a major influence on later entries in the series; both The Sims 3 and The Sims 4 have had weather-focused expansion packs, which have been compared both favorably and unfavorably to the Sims 2 rendition.

== Background and development ==
The Sims is a franchise of life simulation games developed by Maxis and published by Electronic Arts. It has sold over 200 million copies amongst all platforms and installments, making it one of the best-selling video game franchises of all time. The Sims 2, sequel to the original, was released on September 14, 2004. It expanded upon the original game's features, introducing elements such as an aspiration system based around short-term and long-term goals; expanded character and neighborhood customization; and the ability for Sims to raise families, age, and progress through generations.

All main entries in the series have had multiple expansion packs, which add further gameplay options. Rather than being relatively simple downloadable content, expansion packs for the first three games in the Sims series substantially expanded upon the base game's life simulation; Kieron Gillen, writing for Eurogamer in 2005, stated the first game's expansions "could have been expanded [...] into games of their own" and argued their complexity was a component in why The Sims had few competitors in its genre. Eight expansion packs were released for The Sims 2 between 2005 and 2008.

Weather was an intended component of The Sims 2's base game. The demo version shown at E3 2003 included rain, as well as the ability for Sims to die of lightning strikes. During development, developers were unable to resolve a recurring glitch where it rained indoors, resulting in the feature's removal from the game. While mods allowed for rain to be restored, the feature would not be properly added until The Sims 2: Seasons. Development for Seasons began in May 2006. According to an interview with the developers, it was a technically complex expansion to create. Seasons was released on March 1, 2007, becoming the fifth expansion pack for The Sims 2.

== Gameplay ==
The Sims 2: Seasons introduces weather and a defined seasonal cycle to The Sims 2. The cycle is determined by players on a per-neighborhood basis, making it possible to have the same seasons year-round or jump between them in an asynchronous order. Seasons and weather both impact gameplay. In summer, winter, and spring, social interactions are more successful between friends, family members, and romantic partners respectively; in autumn, rather than a relationship impact, Sims build skills more rapidly. Lightning can strike trees or Sims, setting the former aflame and potentially killing the latter.

Alongside weather, Seasons adds gameplay features such as gardening and fishing. These allow Sims to learn new recipes, avoid buying food, or resell the products for a profit. Unlike the simplistic flowerbeds in the base game, which only require occasional watering, gardening is based on a complex system where players need to regularly maintain their plants. Fishing is possible on any lot that has a pond, including many backyards. Fish can be cooked, sold, or mounted on the wall, which increases their sale price. Seasons incorporates the talent badge system from The Sims 2: Open for Business, adding two new badges for fishing and gardening; if Open for Business is installed, Sims can run groceries or fishmongers.

Unlike the first three expansions, Seasons lacks sub-neighborhoods, new gameplay areas that can be added onto existing neighborhoods. In its place, it is the first expansion to add a new base neighborhood, Riverblossom Hills. Riverblossom Hills is themed as a "rustic" countryside town, contrasting with the base game's neighborhoods: the suburban Pleasantview, the desert Strangetown, and the Shakespeare-themed Veronaville. It has six occupied houses, smaller than any of the base game's neighborhoods. Seasons is also the first expansion since The Sims 2: University to add new career tracks, (Note: The Sims 2: Pets added new career tracks, but only for pets.) introducing the Gamer, Adventurer, Music, Law, Journalism, and Education careers.

Like previous expansions, Seasons introduces a new form of supernatural Sims. Sims which overuse pesticides can transform into PlantSims, sprite-like beings with green skin and leaves for hair. PlantSims have different needs and a different lifecycle to other Sims; they age directly from toddlers to adults, and their only requirements are Sunlight, Water, and Love, which function similarly to the normal motives of Energy, Hunger, and Social respectively. They can reproduce asexually, spawning new PlantSims, and receive gold-level gardening talent badges the moment they transform.

== Soundtrack ==
Background music for The Sims 2: Seasons was composed by Mark Mothersbaugh. In-game diegetic music, following the practice for previous expansion packs, comprised Simlish covers of songs by real-world musicians. The soundtrack featured British singer-songwriter Lily Allen, covering her debut single "Smile"; other acts included Gov't Mule, the String Cheese Incident, and the Veronicas. Allen released a machinima music video for the "Smile" cover, the first official music video released for the series and the first official music video in Simlish.

In February 2007, Electronic Arts announced their acquisition of the karaoke website Singshot. Three weeks later, they launched a contest for participants to upload their own Simlish covers of "Smile", competing for a monetary prize and the possibility of recording a Simlish cover for a later game. Winners would be selected by Allen. The winner ultimately contributed an original song to the stuff pack The Sims 2: Teen Style Stuff.

== Reception and legacy ==
The Sims 2: Seasons received a positive reception on release; its aggregate Metascore is 78, indicating "generally favorable reviews". Reviewers positively contrasted its gameplay additions with those of its predecessor The Sims 2: Pets, holding that the expansion altered the underlying gameplay significantly. Seasons sold over a million copies worldwide, becoming the third highest-selling PC game of 2007 and serving as one of EA's best-performing titles during an otherwise unsuccessful quarter. Since its release, Seasons has been characterized as one of the game's more significant expansions and noted for its influence on later games.

=== Contemporary reception ===
Upon release, The Sims 2: Seasons was well received. J. Habib at IGN praised Seasons as "one of the most significant" entries in the series, while Jess Nickelsen at NZGamer said it "entertained [her] far more as a whole" than any other expansion pack. Previous expansions for the game focused on new gameplay elements, while Seasons was more oriented around changing the underlying gameplay itself. This different structure—focused less on "immediate gratification" and more on complex alterations to The Sims 2's structure—was the defining focus of many reviews.

Multiple reviewers praised Seasons for its verisimilitude and complexity. Elements that drew attention included the impacts that very hot or cold weather had on Sims, seasonal variance in Sims' moods and behavior, and the complexity of the game's weather effects. Habib felt that Seasons "gives to your families the passage of time", marking the first time in the series that The Sims felt like a true generational life simulator; he described the expansion pack as a whole as "successful in every way" and a more significant revamp of the base game than its predecessors. Alex Jeffreys at Strategy Informer concurred that "it would not be unfair to say that Sims 2: Seasons revolutionizes the game [...] it's a whole new world out there, a world where nature reigns supreme and your Sims must bow to its forces or suffer the consequences".

Critics were more divided over the expansion pack's other additions, such as gardening and fishing. Mahamari Tsukitasa at Game Chronicles called such elements "surprisingly satisfying" and Nickelsen described them as "the biggest breakthrough since working Sims were allowed to take days off", while Andrew Park at GameSpot felt they failed to rise above "simple, relaxing busywork". Dan Whitehead at Eurogamer, in a mixed review, felt Seasons was "thematically confused [...] somewhere between a oversized object pack and an impressive weather system tech demo".

=== Later reception ===
Critical analysis of Seasons in the years following its release has positioned it as one of the game's more significant expansions. Jasmine Gould-Wilson at GamesRadar, in a 2023 comparison of The Sims 2 and The Sims 4, called Seasons "one of the most integral packs" to the former game; she criticized the markedly longer time it took for The Sims 4: Seasons to come out relative to its base game, juxtaposing The Sims 4's "half-baked expansions that never seemed to live up to our expectations" with the earlier game's more complex entries. Gabrielle Castania, writing for TheGamer, similarly found Seasons to be one of the most impactful of The Sims 2's expansions.

The success of Seasons amongst the game's fanbase influenced releases for later games. Weather-related expansion packs have been released for both The Sims 3 and The Sims 4; Grant Rodiek, a senior producer at Maxis, referred to them as "fan favorites" and some of the most significant entries in the series. Seasons has been held as a benchmark for later weather-related expansions. Its focus on "small, intimate gameplay details" over larger-scale "RPG-style" alterations was described by Petrana Radulovic at Polygon as a major element of the expansion pack's success, one she felt the Sims 4 rendition similarly achieved. The relatively complex and detailed graphics of Seasons were also positively compared to those in later releases, such as the more simplistic snow graphics of the Sims 4 expansion.

The expansion pack's PlantSims have become a recurring element through the series. They were reintroduced in The Sims 3: University Life as a potential consequence of either eating "forbidden fruit" or participating in scientific experiments; for The Sims 4, they were introduced in an update to the base game. Melissa Bianchi, an assistant professor of communication at Nova Southeastern University, analysed PlantSims through the lenses of deep ecology and ecofeminism in a paper for Green Letters: Studies in Ecocriticism. She argued that PlantSims embody the "green society" aspirations of deep ecologists "both literally and figuratively", and that the game's treatment of human-plant hybrids as equal to humans presented a framework where "all life – regardless of its type – [has] intrinsic value". Bianchi called attention to the two premade PlantSims in the game being female, defining this design decision as an allusion to the feminine gendering of nature.

== See also ==
- The Sims 3 expansion packs § Seasons
- The Sims 4 expansion packs § Seasons
