= Bella Goth =

Pre-made character in The Sims

- The Sims character
- Bella Goth in The Sims 2
- First game: The Sims (2000)
- Created by: Will Wright

Bella Goth is a recurring character from The Sims series, known primarily for her disappearance in The Sims 2. Since her original appearance in the first entry of The Sims, she has appeared in nearly every game in the series. She is married to Mortimer Goth, and has two children, Cassandra and Alexander Goth.

In The Sims 2, Bella Goth has been depicted being abducted by aliens and dumped in Strangetown. After her abduction she appears in the game but has no memories of her past. She appeared in The Sims 4 with a lighter skin tone than in previous iterations, similar to other characters at launch.

She has been a generally popular character, regarded as iconic and the face of the series by critics. Her disappearance was particularly discussed by both critics and fans, with both speculating on various details surrounding it, such as her abduction and the nature of her character in The Sims 2.

== Concept and creation ==
Bella Goth was one of multiple pre-made characters created for the video game The Sims. In The Sims 2, there are two distinct Bellas, and fans have theorized that one is a clone or alien impostor; however, the game's developer, Maxis, denied this, stating that both Bellas are real, publishing an in-universe interview with Bella about the abduction that occurred prior to The Sims 2.

She later appears in The Sims 4 in a similar role as in the original game, having noticeably lighter skin than she did, which was true for other darker-skinned characters. This was eventually addressed following some controversy, causing the team to update the game to darken characters' skin color. She was also redesigned in order to make her look older.

== Appearances ==
Bella Goth originally appeared in the first The Sims game as one of the "pre-made" Sims that come pre-installed with the game. She is married to a man named Mortimer Goth, with whom she has one daughter named Cassandra. She is depicted as a housewife and lives on a lot with a haunted graveyard, seemingly populated by relatives of hers and Mortimer's.

The Goth family also appears in The Sims 2, now residing in Pleasantview. A new family member has been added, Bella and Mortimer's younger son Alexander Goth, while Cassandra has reached adulthood and Mortimer has reached retirement age. However, before the events of the game, Bella disappeared, having seemingly been abducted by aliens. As such, she does not physically appear in the game without the use of cheats and external modifications.

Bella Goth appears a second time in The Sims 2 as a NPC in a paranormal-themed world called Strangetown. This version of Bella is close, but not identical to the one in Pleasantview and has no memories or relationship with her family. As Strangetown prominently features a crashed UFO and contains residents of alien origin, it is implied that Bella Goth ended up in Strangetown as a result of the alien abduction. In the PlayStation Portable release, she once again appears as an NPC in Strangetown.

The Sims 3, which takes place before The Sims and The Sims 2, depicts Bella as a child living with her brother and parents under her maiden name of Bella Bachelor in a town called Sunset Valley. Also appearing is her future husband Mortimer, who is revealed to have been her childhood friend.

However, in a downloadable science-fiction-themed world called Lunar Lakes, a gravestone can be found with Bella Goth's name on it, with this sim having seemingly died of old age. Her "bleach blonde ghost" form also often appears.

The Sims 4 depicts an alternate version Bella who is a young adult living with her husband Mortimer and her children Cassandra and Alexander. This incarnation works in law enforcement.

== Reception ==
Bella Goth's lighter skin tone in The Sims 4 received controversy.

Bella has been met with generally positive reception, and is considered an icon of The Sims. Game Rant writer Shayna Josi considered the Goths, Bella included, as the most recognizable in the series, arguing that the consistency of their house and personal style contributed to them being the face of the series in their eyes. They also felt that Bella's disappearance and the lore surrounding it helped with her to be recognized. She has been regarded as one of the best video game characters by Esquire and GamesRadar+, with Esquire writer Adrienne Westenfield praising her "signature" red dress. She was recognized by GameSpot staff as the most well-known character in The Sims, while Polygon writer Petrana Radulovic noted that she was likely to be recognized by even casual fans. In The Sims 4, fans have liked the mixed-race of Goth family from their very first appearance. Since then, Bella has also received attention, particularly for her red dress and breasts, and she has generally been a popular character among fans since appearing in the first game. TechRadar writer Meggie Gates discussed Bella through the lens of Gates's same-sex attraction, discussing her as a key in discovering herself, in part due to a scene where Bella kisses Gates's player character. Harrison Brocklehurst of The Tab praised and said that "the one thing consistent about Bella between the games is that she's always a nice, friendly and well-liked Sim around the town."

The Sims 4 received criticism for dark-skinned character models being more light-skinned than they were in past games. It was later addressed by The Sims Vice President of Franchise Creative, Lyndsay Pearson. She received a revamped model in The Sims 4 and received mixed reception among fans, particularly due to her breast size being decreased. Kotaku writer Ashley Bardhan personally enjoyed the new model. While commenting about "Eurocentric" character design tendencies, Bardhan was enthused with her skin being darker with this new model, as well as her being given "luscious curls of dark hair".

Her disappearance received coverage from critics and fans, with a number of theories produced by fans. Petrana Radulovic of Polygon stated that these "Sims 2 storytellers showed me how to be a better writer" and further said that she "quickly discovered, and fell in love with these storytelling communities. Through them, I'd find players who wrote behind-the-scenes blogs about which details they picked up from the games, and what their interpretations were; which details they left out; and which confusing ones they tried to reconcile (while some of are brilliant, there's definitely a lot of inconsistencies in The Sims 2)." Some speculate that the storyline of Sims' alien abduction is only a cover-up. One fan theory also suggests that Cassandra's fiancé, Don Lothario, had her abducted. The theory posits that he contacted Nina and Dina Caliente, two people who have connections to aliens, after trying to proposition Bella, wanting to hide this from Cassandra. Dina was also speculated to be behind her abduction because she wanted to move in with Mortimer in Bella's absence due to her characterization as a gold digger. Another theory was that the version of her found in Strangetown is a clone. Her disappearance, in conjunction with her different depictions in each game, caused speculation that The Sims 4 was in a different timeline than the other games. BuzzFeed writer Kelly Martinez did a multi-part investigation into the details of Bella's disappearance, expressing her belief in the above-mentioned theories about who was behind her abduction, as well as Strangetown Bella being a clone due to the lack of memories and slightly different appearance. She added her own theory, namely that the dead Bella found on the other planet was the real Bella, having died after being abducted, with a clone made of her.
