= MySims =

2007 video game

- Developers: EA Redwood Shores; TOSE (NDS); Babaroga (Mobile)
- Publisher: Electronic Arts
- Designers: Hunter Howe; Robin Hunicke
- Series: The Sims
- Platforms: Wii; Nintendo DS; Microsoft Windows; Mobile phone BlackBerry; Nintendo Switch iOS macOS tvOS; PlayStation 5 Xbox Series X/S
- Release: DS, Wii: NA: September 18, 2007; AU: September 20, 2007; EU: September 21, 2007; Windows: NA: October 28, 2008; EU: October 31, 2008; AU: November 6, 2008; Mobile; 2008; BlackBerry: WW: August 13, 2009; Nintendo Switch: WW: November 19, 2024; Apple Arcade: WW: November 6, 2025; PlayStation 5, Xbox Series X/S: WW: November 18, 2025
- Genres: City-building; life simulation
- Modes: Single-player, multiplayer

MySims is a video game developed by EA Redwood Shores and published by Electronic Arts as a spin-off to Maxis's The Sims franchise for the Wii and Nintendo DS in September 2007, re-released for Microsoft Windows and mobile phones in 2008, and for BlackBerry in 2009. The game sold over 4 million units as of 2008.

MySims: Cozy Bundle, which contains MySims and MySims Kingdom, was released for Nintendo Switch on November 19, 2024 and released on Microsoft Windows via Steam and Epic Games Store on March 18, 2025. On November 6, 2025, the bundle was released on Apple Arcade and soon followed up with PlayStation 5 and Xbox Series X/S releases later on in the month on the 18th.

== Overview ==
=== Gameplay ===
The game puts players in charge of redeveloping a town that has become run down. Through creative building and design elements, players can improve the town, which attracts new residents, who subsequently need homes built for them. Customization is a large element of the game, including houses, furniture and outfits.

Apart from creating a custom Mii-like character, players may also modify their houses and build furniture and appliances using a selection of building blocks. This gives the player more building options, allowing them to create objects by using blueprints, a change from the usual virtual catalog found in The Sims. There are 80 characters with whom the player may interact in the Wii version (30 characters in the Nintendo DS version), such as a mad scientist, a magician, a librarian, a pizza chef, and a martial arts teacher. Some of these characters may ask the player to build things for them. As with previous Sims games, meeting people and forming relationships is a major gameplay focus, but unlike The Sims games, the characters do not have to fulfil needs such as hunger and sleep. Becoming a Sim's best friend will earn the player either a special blueprint not available anywhere else in the game, or a style of clothing for their wardrobe. Players can also earn blueprints by performing tasks for Commercial Sims (Sims who have their own businesses). Typically this involves building around 5-10 items for Sims, depending on the Star Level (the 1-5 level) of the player's town and the essences they have access to.

A feature new to MySims is "Essences". They can be found in various locations in town or by interacting with Sims or objects. Essences are used for a number of things including paint for the walls of houses, construction of items, as well as decoration. The minigames in the DS Version include racquetball, paragliding, Scuba diving and more.

=== Character design ===
Compared to previous Sims titles, MySims has a more Chibi-inspired look, with cute character designs; this was Emmy Toyonaga's idea. In Official Nintendo Magazine, she remarked: "Well, Mario and other Nintendo characters are pretty short and stubby. Also, being Japanese, I'm used to the mindset that fun games should have shorter, stubbier characters. So these characters came naturally." In April 2007, designer Robin Hunicke said in Nintendo Power that the character designs imply youthfulness and that the aesthetic was chosen for worldwide appeal while referring to the lesser sales of previous Sims games in Japan compared to other territories. MySims also differs from The Sims games by introducing a designed cast of characters rather than procedurally-generated "townies". Every NPC the player encounters has their own name, personality, and backstory.

=== Music ===
The game's music was composed by John Enroth and Silas Hite of Mutato Muzika. The music changes depending on what type of building the player is visiting. There is a specific motif for each business and for each Interest, which will play when the player approaches a building.

== Release ==
MySims was released for the Wii and Nintendo DS in September 2007. In October 2008, the game was released on PC, featuring additional characters and online features, allowing players to communicate and participate in mini-games such as tag and hide-and-seek. In 2010, Taco Bell included a copy of MySims with its kids' meals in the United States.

On November 19, 2024, Electronic Arts released My Sims: Cozy Bundle on Nintendo Switch, featuring a high-definition version of MySims. On March 18, 2025, it was released on EA Play, Steam, and the Epic Games Store. A subsequent update from Electronic Arts added compatibility with the Steam Deck. On November 6, 2025, MySims: Cozy Bundle was released on Apple Arcade and soon followed up with PlayStation 5 and Xbox Series X/S releases on November 18.

== Reception ==
Reception

Aggregate score
Aggregator	Score			
Aggregator	DS	mobile	PC	Wii
Metacritic	67/100	N/A	70/100	68/100

Review scores
Publication	Score			
Publication	DS	mobile	PC	Wii
Electronic Gaming Monthly	N/A	N/A	N/A	5.83/10
Eurogamer	6/10	N/A	N/A	8/10
Famitsu	28/40	N/A	N/A	30/40
Game Informer	N/A	N/A	N/A	8/10
GamePro	N/A	N/A	N/A	2.5/5
GameRevolution	N/A	N/A	N/A	C−
GameSpot	6.5/10	N/A	N/A	6.5/10
GameSpy	3.5/5	N/A	N/A	3.5/5
GameTrailers	N/A	N/A	N/A	6.8/10
IGN	6.9/10	N/A	7/10	7/10
Nintendo Life	6/10	N/A	N/A	8/10
Nintendo Power	N/A	N/A	N/A	7/10
PC Gamer (UK)	N/A	N/A	68%	N/A
Pocket Gamer	3/5	3.5/5	N/A	N/A
Digital Spy	N/A	N/A	N/A	3/5

The game received "average" reviews on all platforms according to the review aggregation website Metacritic. In Japan, where the Wii version was ported for release under the name Boku to Sim no Machi (ぼくとシムのまち, Boku to Shimu no Machi) on September 27, 2007, followed by the DS version under the name Boku to Sim no Machi: Resort ni Genki o Torimodosō! (ぼくとシムのまち リゾートに元気をとりもどそう！, Boku to Shimu no Machi Risōto ni Genki o Torimodosō!) on December 6, 2007, Famitsu gave it a score of 30 out of 40 for the former, and 28 out of 40 for the latter.

IGN said of the Wii version, "The problem is that nearly all of the objectives revolve around the same two tasks: the collection of essences and the construction of houses, buildings and items. All of the Sim management and social interaction elements of the previous games – well, you're not going to find much of that in the streamlined Wii affair." GameSpot praised the same console version for the construction being intuitive and flexible and for the presentation being cheery and clean. It was also criticized for having longer than usual load times. Its Nintendo DS counterpart is regarded as virtually an all new game in design; however, reception of its control scheme varied greatly.

GameZone gave the PC version a score of seven out of ten, saying, "Geared more for younger players, MySims is a nice little experience with a linear story arc that players will have to play to unlock the wide variety of content." However, Edge gave the Wii version a score of six out of ten, saying, "Residents themselves are a colourless bunch, a series of knowing archetypes – goth girls, hip DJs, Italian chefs – that lack the effortless charm of Animal Crossing's simple ciphers."

=== Sales ===
MySims is one of the best-selling Nintendo DS video games. By October 2008, the game had sold over 4 million copies worldwide. This total included 3.72 million units sold prior to the end of that year, earning a Guinness World Record for the best-selling Sims title on a Nintendo console. By December 2008, MySims had sold over one million units on the Nintendo DS in the United States.

In the United States, MySims: Cozy Bundle was the 19th best-selling title in November 2024. The game also ranked as the 10th best-selling Nintendo Switch title for the period from January 5 to February 1, 2025.

In the United Kingdom, MySims: Cozy Bundle debuted at number 8 on the physical sales chart for the week ending November 23, 2024. In December, it ranked 25th for the week ending December 7, moved to 15th for the week of December 14, placed 20th for the week ending December 21, and ranked 23rd for the week ending December 28. In January 2025, MySims: Cozy Bundle was the 21st best-selling title for the week ending January 4, 25th for the week ending January 11, and 29th for the week ending January 18. In February, the game placed 17th for the week ending February 8, 20th for February 15, and 31st for February 22. In March, MySims: Cozy Bundle ranked 16th for the week ending March 15, 21st for the week ending March 21, and 24th for the week ending March 28. In April, the game placed 34th for the week ending April 19.

In February 2025, Electronic Arts CEO Andrew Wilson said MySims: Cozy Bundle had "performed well ahead of our expectations".

== Sequels ==
Five games have been subsequently released in the MySims series.

Game	Release date
MySims Kingdom	October 28, 2008
MySims Party	March 10, 2009
MySims Racing	June 12, 2009
MySims Agents	September 25, 2009
MySims SkyHeroes	September 28, 2010
