= Junior Rodrigues =

Film director

- Occupations: Film director, film producer, screenwriter
- Years active: 2013–present
- Website: Official Website

Junior Rodrigues better known by his stage name WTFjuinin, is a film director, film producer and screenwriter of The Sims. He is best known for directing the film The Paranormal, which had its sequence in June 2014. He also made short films and is currently producing the remake of the book/film The Fault in Our Stars, A Culpa é do Destino.

== Films ==
- The Paranormal - O Filme (2013)
- The Paranormal 2 - O Filme (2014)
- A Culpa é do Destino (2015)

== Short films ==
- História da Vida (Família Turner) (2013)
- Especial Dia das Mães (2014)
- A Despedida (2014)

== Gameplays ==
- The Sims (2014)
- The Sims 4 (2014–present)
