= Sims Community =

Online media publisher

- Industry: News
- Founded: May 21, 2013; 12 years ago in Bosnia and Herzegovina
- Founder: Jovan Jović
- Owner: Jovan Jović
- Website: Sims Community

'Sims Community' is an online media publisher that specializes in news and features related to The Sims franchise by Electronic Arts (EA). Founded on May 21, 2013, by Jovan Jović, the website has garnered millions of users worldwide. In 2022, Sims Community officially registered as a business entity.

== History ==
Sims Community was founded on May 21, 2013, by Jovan Jović. The website was launched three weeks after the release of The Sims 4. It started as a platform to discuss features, gameplay, and updates related to The Sims franchise and quickly gained a following among fans.

In 2022, after nearly a decade of operation, Sims Community officially registered as a business entity under its founder and CEO, Jovan Jović.

== Content and influence ==
Sims Community is a resource for articles, guides, and news updates related to The Sims but also a source for leaks related to the game. It has been cited as a source by various other news publishers and is known for its in-depth coverage of the game series.

In addition to news and updates, the website has undergone a rebranding process, developing its own unique graphic design language, including versatile iconography and a Community Crystal as a replacement for the traditional plum bob.

== Activism ==
In 2022, Electronic Arts announced that they would not feature lesbian couples on the cover of their games in Russia due to federal laws on LGBT propaganda. Following pressure from the Sims user base including Sims Community, Electronic Arts decided to continue advertising their game in Russia with the same-sex couple on the cover.
