= MySims SkyHeroes =

2010 video game

- Developer: Behaviour Interactive
- Publisher: Electronic Arts
- Series: The Sims
- Platforms: Nintendo DS; PlayStation 3 Wii; Xbox 360
- Release: NA: September 28, 2010; EU: October 1, 2010
- Genres: Combat flight simulator, racing, vehicular combat
- Modes: Single-player, multiplayer

MySims SkyHeroes is a video game developed by Behaviour Interactive and published by Electronic Arts. It is the sixth and final game in the MySims series. The game was released in 2010 for the Nintendo DS, PlayStation 3, Wii, and Xbox 360.

It used to be the only MySims game to be released on non-Nintendo home consoles until the release of MySims: Cozy Bundle on PlayStation 5 and Xbox Series X/S in 2025.

== Gameplay ==
MySims SkyHeroes is an aviation game that features a solo campaign, boss battles, local co-op, and online multiplayer. There are upgrades for the planes through a plane editor which will allow players to customize a plane using parts like wings and engines acquired by completing missions. Some upgrades are purely decorative, like wheel styles, but wing, engine and body upgrades upgrade stats using a three star rating system.

=== Multiplayer ===
The multiplayer modes available are racing and battle modes. In multi-player, users which have a game profile will be able to use their saved planes and avatars.

== Plot ==
The player starts out as an unknown pilot and leads the resistance to the evil Morcubus and his drones who plan to take over the skyways. The player will have to team up with NPCs to defeat Morcubus and his Chaos Pirates. This game introduces new characters Rose, Dragomir and Svetlana as the Chaos Pirates' top pilots.

== Reception ==
Reception

Aggregate score
Aggregator	Score			
Aggregator	DS	PS3	Wii	Xbox 360
Metacritic	53/100	52/100	67/100	56/100

Review scores
Publication	Score			
Publication	DS	PS3	Wii	Xbox 360
GamesMaster	N/A	80%	N/A	N/A
GameSpot	N/A	4.5/10	4.5/10	4.5/10
GameZone	N/A	N/A	N/A	5/10
IGN	5/10	7/10	7/10	7/10
NGamer	60%	N/A	N/A	N/A
Nintendo Power	N/A	N/A	7.5/10	N/A
Nintendo World Report	N/A	N/A	7.5/10	N/A
PlayStation Official Magazine – UK	N/A	7/10	N/A	N/A
Official Xbox Magazine (US)	N/A	N/A	N/A	5.5/10
Push Square	N/A	5/10	N/A	N/A
Common Sense Media	N/A	N/A	N/A	4/5

The game received "mixed or average reviews" on all platforms according to the review aggregation website Metacritic.

IGN commented on the PlayStation 3 and Xbox 360 versions' high quality graphics. IGN also commented on the Wii version's simple controls but felt that the game has nothing really special about it. "The story mode is missing the clever writing that was enjoyed in some of the previous MySims games, and the lack of variety in the missions makes most of them feel like a chore". "Multiplayer can be fun, but it's not doing anything we haven't seen before". IGN commented that the DS version is oddly more complicated and way less fun than the console versions. The punishing gameplay takes away from what could have been a really fun multiplayer experience.
