= MySims Agents =

2009 video game

- Wii box art
- Developers: EA Redwood Shores (Wii); Tose (DS)
- Publisher: Electronic Arts
- Directors: Kazuya Watanabe (DS); Brent Iverson (Wii)
- Producers: Mitch Ueno (DS); Rachel Bernstein (Wii)
- Designer: Hunter Howe (Wii)
- Writer: Brian Kaiser (Wii)
- Series: MySims
- Platforms: Nintendo DS, Wii
- Release: EU: September 25, 2009; NA: September 29, 2009; AU: October 5, 2009
- Genre: Life simulation
- Mode: Single-player

MySims Agents is a 2009 mystery life simulation video game published by Electronic Arts. The fifth instalment in the MySims series, it was released in Europe on September 25, 2009, and in Australia on October 5, 2009 for both the Nintendo DS and the Wii. It was slated for release on June 16 in North America for both consoles, but was instead released on September 29. In the Wii version, the player is tasked with solving several cases which help the player determine the evil plot of the game's antagonist, while unlocking additional features which are essential to completing the game. For the DS version, the player has to take part in several minigames and interact with various townspeople to find a thief who attempts to steal a secret treasure.

Upon release, the Wii version received positive reviews from critics, who complimented the game's graphics and storyline, but criticized the game's lack of challenge. Conversely, the DS version received mixed reviews, with reviewers criticizing the minigames and graphics and considering its gameplay to be incoherent.

== Gameplay ==
The player looking for footprints during one of the cases

The player begins as an aspiring detective alongside their friend Buddy in the Wii version. Upon completing a case regarding a dog and its true owner, the player is approached by a special agent from the Sim Protection Agency (S.P.A) who informs the player that their application is approved and they are hired as a junior agent. The special agent notifies the player that the agency is onto the man from the dog case (whose name is revealed to be Morcubus) believing he has a grand villainous plan. After solving the cases on main street, the player is promoted to a special agent and is given access to the first S.P.A headquarters located in the town. Inside the headquarters, there are five floors, four which can be decorated with furniture the player earns in the game. As part of their workload from S.P.A, the player is also able to hire other citizens as junior agents, whose purpose is to solve dispatch missions. Each case which the player investigates involve several minigames which are analyzing chemicals, hacking, lock picking and repairing machines. The player wields several tools throughout the game which are a wrench used to salvage spare parts, a magnifying glass which is used to track footsteps and a crowbar used to pry objects open. As the game progresses, each tool gets a technological update.

In the DS version, the player works as an undercover agent who learns from the town's mayor that a thief who goes by "V" is planning to steal the town's secret treasure and has to catch him before he obtains it. Throughout the game, the player must complete minigames, side missions, travel to different locations and interact with villagers to determine V's whereabouts. Completing the minigames rewards the player with Simoleons, the in-game currency of the Sims universe, which can be used to purchase decorations. Additionally, the collection of essences from the previous MySims games returns and the player can decorate the town, their house or headquarters.

By contrast, in the Wii version, the player instead solves a series of mysteries which are all connected to Morcubus and his organisation Morcucorp. These cases take them through a variety of new regions including a mountain range, an industrial district, a bayou mansion, a beachside boardwalk and finally an Aztec-themed temple. By completing each quest, they earn new junior agents, and decorations to increase the agents' statistics (there is no Simoleon currency and decorations are not purchasable). By opening treasure chests, examining (e.g.) hedges and trash cans and more, the player can find decorations, wearable clothing cosmetics, and paints for their headquarters.

== Development and release ==
Electronic Arts announced the game during a press release on April 22, 2009 for both consoles, with the release date in North America being June 16 and elsewhere in the autumn of the same year. The game was developed by The Sims Studio and was the fifth game in the MySims series. According to general manager of the MySims series Tim LeTourneau, MySims Agents was going to be "completely different than any MySims game before". In a sneak peek for IGN, several producers who worked on the Wii version of the game, including lead producer Rachel Bernstein, gave a walkthrough of the game. On September 25, 2009 the game was released for both the DS and the Wii in Europe, and four days later it was also released in North America. The game was later released in Australia on October 5, 2009.

== Reception ==
Reception

Aggregate score
Aggregator	Score	
Aggregator	DS	Wii
Metacritic	60/100	78/100

Review scores
Publication	Score	
Publication	DS	Wii
1Up.com	N/A	C+
Famitsu	27/40	26/40
GamesMaster	80%	N/A
GameSpot	N/A	7.5/10
GameTrailers	N/A	7.3/10
GameZone	N/A	7.5/10
IGN	4.9/10	7.8/10
NGamer	71%	87%
Nintendo Power	N/A	7/10
Nintendo World Report	N/A	8.5/10

The Wii version received "generally favorable reviews", while the DS version received "mixed or average" reviews, according to the review aggregation website Metacritic. In Japan, where the game was ported for release under the name Boku to Sim no Machi Agents: Mai no Kaitō Kara Hihō wo ma mo re Taisaku Ikusa! (ぼくとシムのまち エージェント 〜謎の怪盗から秘宝をまもれ大作戦！〜, Boku to Shimu no Machi Ējento 〜Mai no Kaitō Kara Hihō wo ma mo re Taisaku Ikusa!〜) on October 1, 2009, Famitsu gave it a score of 27 out of 40 for the DS version, and 26 out of 40 for the Wii version.

Matt Casamassina of IGN called the Wii version of the game "[his] favorite game in the series", praised its visuals and the minigames, but lamented the dialogue stating "much of the comedy, particularly from your sidekick character Buddy, isn't very funny" and that the "sickly sweet character dialog [sic]" from the previous games returns for "disappointing results". However, GameSpot's Allen Rausch felt that "Your sidekick Buddy, for example, provides most of the laugh-out loud humor through his wonderfully expressive body language." He offered that the game "stands out" as the best game from the MySims series. Rausch further complimented the adventurous nature of the game and its storyline, but criticized the simplicity of the puzzles. Nick Ellis, writing for GamesRadar+, affirmed that the game had "[an] amusing script and snazzy visuals" and that "the game never gets tedious despite some repetition". Heath Hooker of GameZone commended the graphics, storyline and dialogue, noted that MySims Agents would be "well received by the Wii's younger audience", and considered that certain hints were unclear while some missions were "extremely simple". Kotaku's AJ Glasser asserted that the game "[is] fun, appropriately long with decent controls and appealing visuals" listing its "linear gameplay", visuals and the diverse puzzles as positive qualities, nonetheless criticizing the process of changing clothes and the low-battery "intrusive wiimote notification". Writing for The Independent, Rebecca Armstrong declared that the game is "[an] acute twist on both the Sims and James Bond" and that it is a "charming new addition to the family".

Casamassina gave the DS version of the game a negative review, calling it "a far more tedious, unbalanced affair that is just as likely to frustrate as it is entertain" and its minigames "disappointingly tedious and long", further criticizing its controls how the day-night cycle works. Dharn Ubarry of Jeuxvideo.com opined that it "leaves much to be desired" and does not "break three feet of a duck", considered the minigames to be "simplistic" and "soporific" and was also critical of the day-night cycle. Gamekult's Loup Lassinat-Foubert stated that the progression of the game "isn't much more exciting", regarded the minigames to "not [be] executed properly" and pointed out its graphical and technical bugs.

=== Sales ===
In the United Kingdom, MySims Agents ranked as the 16th best-selling video game for the week ending September 26. From September 27 to October 3, the game moved to 7th place. The Nintendo DS version also appeared on the individual format chart, reaching 14th position. On October 8, MySims Agents was also listed as the 4th best-selling Nintendo DS title on Amazon. For the week ending October 10, the game was the 13th best-selling title overall, followed by 22nd place for the week ending October 17, and 33rd for the week ending October 24.
