= MySims Racing =

2009 video game

- PAL cover art
- Developer: Artificial Mind & Movement
- Publisher: Electronic Arts
- Composer: Mark Mothersbaugh
- Series: The Sims
- Engine: Havok (Wii)
- Platforms: Wii, Nintendo DS
- Release: NA: June 16, 2009; PAL: June 19, 2009
- Genres: Racing, life simulation
- Modes: Single-player, multiplayer

MySims Racing is a kart racing game developed by Artificial Mind & Movement (now Behaviour Interactive) and published by Electronic Arts as part of the MySims series, a spin-off from its trademark The Sims series of games. The title was released in June 2009 for the Nintendo DS and Wii.

Though similar to Mario Kart, the game offers some unique gameplay features, such as a Story Mode (similar to the rebooted Need for Speed series), basic car and character customization, and the ability to transfer cars to and from Wii Remotes.

== Gameplay ==
In MySims Racing, players begin as novice racers and progress through the ranks by competing against various rivals on a variety of tracks set in the fictional world of Speedville. As players win races, they unlock new customization options for their karts, including upgraded engines and body parts. The game features a range of racing modes and customization elements.

== Release ==
MySims Racing was released for the Wii and Nintendo DS on June 16, 2009.

== Reception ==
Reception

Aggregate score
Aggregator	Score	
Aggregator	DS	Wii
Metacritic	67/100	68/100

Review scores
Publication	Score	
Publication	DS	Wii
4Players	48%	64%
Famitsu	25/40	26/40
Gamekult	4/10	4/10
GamesMaster	N/A	60%
GameSpot	7/10	7.5/10
GameTrailers	N/A	6.3/10
GameZone	6.5/10	7/10
IGN	N/A	7/10
Jeuxvideo.com	12/20	N/A
NGamer	67%	69%
Nintendo World Report	8/10	8/10
Official Nintendo Magazine	N/A	72%

The game received "average" reviews on both platforms according to the review aggregation website Metacritic. In Japan, where the game was ported for release under the name Boku to Sim no Machi Racing (ぼくとシムのまち レーシング, Boku to Shimu no Machi Rēshingu) on June 25, 2009, Famitsu gave it a score of 26 out of 40 for the Wii version, and 25 out of 40 for the DS version.

Austin Light of GameSpot praised the Wii version's customization and new style of kart racing. The DS version was praised for its fun customization options, the Story mode that mixes up the standard kart-racing formula and its crisp, vibrant visuals both in and out of races; however, Light felt the game's Story mode was too long.

=== Sales ===
In the United Kingdom, MySims Racing ranked as the 28th best-selling video game for the week ending June 27. It placed 31st the following week, ending July 4, and moved to 40th for the week ending July 11. The game moved to 37th for the week ending July 18. It later re-entered the charts at 31st for the week ending August 1, and placed 34th the following week, ending August 8.
