= MySims Party =

2009 video game

- NTSC cover art
- Developer: Hudson Soft
- Publisher: Electronic Arts
- Series: The Sims
- Engine: Havok
- Platforms: Wii, Nintendo DS
- Release: NA: March 10, 2009; JP/AU: March 12, 2009; EU: March 13, 2009
- Genres: Party, life simulation
- Modes: Single-player, multiplayer

MySims Party is a video game developed by Hudson Soft and published by Electronic Arts as a spinoff to Maxis' The Sims franchise for the Nintendo DS and Wii in 2009. It is the third game in the MySims series. It consists of 50+ mini-games which can be played with up to 4 players. The game was released on March 10, 2009, in North America.

== Gameplay ==
=== Wii version ===
The Wii version of MySims Party takes a departure from The Sims franchise and the other MySims games and begins with a character moving into a run-down town with a mayor desperate to bring residents back. The player's job is to enter festivals and win to bring new people into town. Players must collect points during these minigames to gain new characters and monuments and in return are given new playable characters and outfits for their Sim. As the town's population increases, new areas are unlocked.

The player can interact with citizens by talking to them. The player character can be customized in many different items. Unlike other games in The Sims franchise, the Sim does not have needs or wants.

In the Nintendo Wii version of MySims Party only the Wii Remote is used to play minigames.

=== Nintendo DS version ===
The Nintendo DS version of MySims Party takes place in a run-down town with the player tasked with the job of bringing residents to the island. This is accomplished by playing minigames for the locals who live in town and after the player has done with a certain festival to earn stars. Players collect stars to unlock other parts of town as well as new minigames and new items in stores. As more stars are collected, the town grows and mini-games are unlocked.

The player can interact with tourists and residents. Minigames can be played, and depending on how they do, they are unlocked as playable characters. The Sim's style can be changed in any different way in the wardrobe. Unlike other games in The Sims franchise, Sims do not have needs or wants but sleeping can be optional.

The Nintendo DS version of MySims supports touchscreen and microphone functionality. The touch screen is used for talking and movement as well as placing and moving houses or furniture. Other buttons may control specific tasks such as taking photos or initiating conversation. This version also features a number of mini-games.

== Reception ==
Reception

Aggregate score
Aggregator	Score	
Aggregator	DS	Wii
Metacritic	64/100	56/100

Review scores
Publication	Score	
Publication	DS	Wii
4Players	N/A	60%
Famitsu	26/40	25/40
Game Informer	N/A	6/10
GamesMaster	N/A	61%
GameZone	7/10	5.5/10
IGN	6.4/10	6/10
NGamer	60%	55%
Nintendo Life	N/A	4/10
Nintendo Power	N/A	5/10
Official Nintendo Magazine	N/A	61%

The game received "mixed" reviews on both platforms according to the review aggregation website Metacritic. In Japan, where the game was ported for release under the name Boku to Sim no Machi Party (ぼくとシムのまち パーティー, Boku to Shimu no Machi Pātī) on March 12, 2009 (the same release date as the Australian version), Famitsu gave it a score of 26 out of 40 for the DS version, and 25 out of 40 for the Wii version.

MySims Party debuted at 35th on the United Kingdom physical sales chart for the week ending March 21, 2009.
