= The Sims 3 =

2009 video game

- Developer: Maxis Redwood Shores (Note: PlayStation 3 and Xbox 360 version developed by Edge of Reality. Wii version developed by Artificial Mind & Movement. Mobile versions developed by EA Mobile, while the Nintendo DS version was developed by Exient Entertainment.)
- Publisher: Electronic Arts
- Director: Matt Brown
- Producers: JoAnna Lio Amos; Lyndsay Pearson
- Designers: Ray Mazza; Matt Goss; Eric Holmberg-Weidler; Juan Custer; Paul Boyle; Sean Baity
- Programmer: Darren Gyles
- Artist: Morgan Godat
- Writer: Sean Baity
- Composers: Steve Jablonsky; Pieter Schlosser
- Series: The Sims
- Platforms: Microsoft Windows, Mac OS X, Android, BlackBerry OS, Windows Phone, iOS, PlayStation 3, Xbox 360, Nintendo DS, N-Gage 2.0, Wii, Nintendo 3DS
- Release: June 2, 2009: Windows, Mac OS X; NA: June 2, 2009; AU/EU: June 4, 2009; UK: June 5, 2009 Mobile; June 2, 2009; N-Gage 2.0; July 14, 2009; Xbox 360, PlayStation 3, Nintendo DS; NA: October 26, 2010; EU: October 29, 2010; AU: November 5, 2010 Wii; EU: November 12, 2010; NA: November 15, 2010; AU: November 18, 2010 Nintendo 3DS; EU: March 25, 2011; NA: March 27, 2011
- Genre: Social simulation
- Mode: Single-player

The Sims 3 is a 2009 social simulation video game developed by the Redwood Shores studio of Maxis, and published by Electronic Arts. Part of The Sims series, it is the sequel to The Sims 2. It was released on June 2, 2009, for Microsoft Windows, MacOS, and mobile versions. Console versions were released for PlayStation 3, Xbox 360, and Nintendo DS in October 2010 and a month later for Wii. A Nintendo 3DS version, released on March 27, 2011, was one of the platform's launch titles.

The game follows the same premises as its predecessors The Sims and The Sims 2 and is based around a life simulation where the player controls the actions and fates of its characters, the Sims, as well as their houses and neighborhoods. The Sims 3 expands on previous games in having an open world system, where neighborhoods are completely open for the sims to move around without any loading screens. A new design tool, the Create-a-Style tool, was also introduced. Create-a-Style allows for clothing, hair, as well as most objects and walls/floors to be visually customized, with several textures and materials available to use. Custom designs can also be saved for later use.

The Sims 3 was a critical and commercial success, selling 1.4 million copies in its first week, and is now regarded as one of the greatest video games ever made. The game has sold over ten million copies worldwide since its release with over seven million PC copies, making it one of the best-selling PC games of all time. The game received eleven expansion packs and nine "stuff packs". A sequel, The Sims 4, was released in September 2014.

== Gameplay ==
As in previous games of the franchise, in The Sims 3 players control their own Sims' activities and relationships. The gameplay is open-ended and does not have a defined goal. The Sims live in neighborhoods, now being officially referred to as worlds, which can be customized, allowing the player to create their houses, community lots, and Sims, although many of these come with the core game. These worlds are now seamless, allowing all Sims to move around freely without any loading screen in between lots, as happened in the previous games.

The neighborhood includes community lots which can be leisure lots (parks, markets, gyms, and movie theaters) and job lots (town hall, hospital, and businesses). Since the neighborhood is open, the game includes the "Story Progression" mechanic, which allows all Sims in the neighborhood to autonomously continue their lives without the player ever controlling them. This helps to advance the story of the whole neighborhood instead of only the active playing units. Sims live for a set duration of time that is adjustable by the player and advance through several life stages (baby, toddler, child, teen, young adult, adult, and elder). Sims can die of old age or from causes such as fire, starvation, drowning, and electrocution.

The base game comes with the world Sunset Valley and an additional world called Riverview can be obtained for free from The Sims 3 Store website. All expansion packs except Generations and Seasons included a world, and additional worlds can be bought at The Sims 3 Store for SimPoints. Sunset Valley and a few of the other worlds available have some degree of connection to the storyline set up by The Sims and The Sims 2. In-game Sunset Valley is stated to be the same town as the default neighborhood in The Sims, and Pleasantview from The Sims 2, although set twenty-five and fifty years earlier, respectively. Several pre-made characters from other Sim games appear throughout The Sims 3's worlds, many of them in younger form.

Career opportunities like working overtime or completing tasks can yield a pay raise, cash bonus, or relationship boost. Challenges occur randomly based on each Sim's lifestyle, like relationships, skills, and jobs. Skill opportunities are the requests by your Sim's neighbors or community members for Sims to solve problems using their acquired skills for cash or relationship rewards. The new Wishes reward system replaces the Wants and Fears system in its predecessor, The Sims 2. Fulfilling a Sim's wishes contributes to the Sim's Lifetime Happiness score, allowing players to purchase Lifetime Rewards for the cost of those Lifetime Happiness points. The game introduces a big change in terms of customization with the "Create-a-Style" tool. In this way, every object or piece of clothing in the game is completely customizable in terms of color (which can be picked from a color wheel), material (plastic, stone, fabric, wood, and so on) or design pattern.

=== Create-a-Sim ===
The Sims 3 introduces many more character customization options than its predecessor The Sims 2. Like the previous game, the player can customize age, body build, skin color, hairstyles, clothing, and personality. A new life stage is included between adolescence and adulthood: young adulthood. This stage was introduced in The Sims 2 University only during the university period, but is now accessible from Create-a-Sim. Additional options were added in expansions and updates, such as tattoos, breast size, and muscle definition. The Sims 3 offers a wider range of skin tones than its predecessors, ranging from realistic light and dark skin tones to fantasy green and purple colors.

As opposed to previous games, where personalities consisted of sliders, and a limited set of personality points to distribute among them, The Sims 3 introduces a trait system: adult Sims can have up to five personality traits to pick from a list. These traits can be mental, physical, social, or influenced by lifestyle and jobs. The traits will determine different actions the Sims can make, as well as behaviors and wishes.

=== Skills ===
The Sims can learn skills from interacting with different objects. Skills improve gradually in 10 levels. Skill improvements are useful for achieving career goals, as well as unlocking new possibilities for those activities which require the skills; for example, a high gardening level allows the sims to plant different rare seeds. The basic skills include Logic, Cooking, Painting, Gardening, Writing, Guitar, Athletic, Handiness, Charisma, and Fishing. New skills were later added in expansion packs.

=== Careers ===
Many of the careers from The Sims and The Sims 2 are back in The Sims 3. The careers in the core game are Business, Culinary, Criminal, Education, Journalism, Law Enforcement, Medical, Military, Music, Political, Science, and Professional Sports, as well as part-time jobs in the book shop, supermarket, or spa, which can be accomplished by both adults and teenagers. Each one of the jobs takes place in a community lot of the neighborhood; however, these lots are only "rabbit-hole" buildings, with an external façade, but the player cannot access them and is not able to see what happens inside. Thus, jobs are automatic in the game, even if the player will sometimes receive challenges and questions with different options to have more control over the sims' career performance. Advancing in a career still depends on mood and skills, but with the addition that relationships with colleagues/boss and even certain goals that have to be fulfilled. Players can control if the Sims "Work Hard", "Take It Easy", and "Suck Up To Boss", thus affecting their performance. A new feature The Sims 3 offers is branching careers, which allows Sims to choose a certain path in their career (such as a Sim in the Music career can eventually choose to specialize in Symphonic music or Rock). These branches are generally offered around level 6 of a career, depending on which career the Sim is working.

The Ambitions expansion pack includes brand-new professions that are playable: Firefighter, Ghost Hunter, Investigator, Architectural Designer, and Stylist. Some of them take place in a playable community lot, such as Firefighter or Stylist, while the others are freelance jobs. Players can search for gigs in the neighborhood and actually accomplish them. For example, an Architectural Designer can visit other sims' houses and redecorate them in exchange for money and career performance. Sims are also able to make a living at home through their skills such as selling their own paintings, writing novels, playing guitar for tips, or growing fruit and vegetables. Sims can also buy out businesses and receive a percentage of the profits they earn.

=== Build and Buy modes ===
As in previous Sim games, a build and buy tool is included to design houses and community lots. The two modes retain most of the main fundamental tools from the previous games. Build mode is used to add walls, paint them, add stairs, doors and windows, lay down flooring, create foundations, basements, pools, and ponds. Some expansion packs add extra build mode features such as terrain design. Players cannot build or place objects outside the limits of the lot.

In Buy mode, the player can purchase and place down new objects, such as appliances, electronics, furniture, and vehicles. Buy mode largely focuses on providing objects that are useful or necessary for the sims, allowing them to build skills, provide some sort of utility, or purely to act as house decoration. The descriptions of many of the objects available for purchase in the game involve humor, sarcasm, insults towards the player, and wit, and serves as comic relief in the game.

The build and buy modes have received their own makeover. The modes maintain the grid building system from the previous game; however, this grid is more flexible now, allowing the objects to be laid down in the middle of the tiles or without any grid help at all. A blueprint mode is added in further expansions, where pre-designed rooms are available to lay down as-is. The Create-a-Style tool can also be applied to redesign every single piece of furniture or building, changing to any color, material, or design pattern.

=== Create-a-World ===
On October 29, 2009, Electronic Arts announced "Create-a-World" (CAW), which is a game world editor that allows players to create their own custom cities from scratch for use within the game. Players can customize lots, choose terrain patterns and add roads, vegetation, and neighborhood accents, such as water towers and lighthouses. CAW also allows players to import designs from PNG files for use in their worlds. Users can upload their worlds to The Sims 3 Exchange for download by other players. The editor tool is offered to players as a separate download, and was released on December 16, 2009, as a beta version. EA would offer technical support and updates. Players are able to share their neighborhoods as with other content. The Create-a-World tool is available for Windows-based PCs.

=== Family ===
As a life simulation game, Sims can have families. Players can create a family in Create-a-Sim and edit their relationships, or they can manually meet different sims and have children. Young adults and adults can try for a baby. There is no "Try for Baby" option for any younger or older Sims. The only exception is senior males – they can try for a baby with a young adult or adult female, although conception can be significantly harder. In order to try for a baby, two Sims of the opposite gender must have a relationship of "Romantic Interest" or higher. A lullaby-like melody will play if the sim has conceived, although on rare occasions it may not play. Sims will get the Nauseous moodlet if they are pregnant, and these symptoms will persist for about one Sim day until they discover they are pregnant and will change into default pregnancy clothes. From now on until after birth, the Sim will not be able to wear their usual clothes. Some pregnancy symptoms Sims can experience are nausea, backache, reduced or increased appetite, and inability to partake in certain actions or exercise. When the Sim goes into labour, they can either deliver the baby at hospital or have a home birth. Most Sims go to hospital by default, although this action can be cancelled. Kids and baby interior can be bought in buy mode. Babies require a lot of attention and care, and can get whisked away by social services if it is not given to them – along with toddlers, kids, and teenagers. Babysitters can be hired to accompany children if their parents are busy.

== Development ==
Electronic Arts announced The Sims 3 on March 19, 2008. On January 15, 2009, Maxis invited "some of the best" custom content creators to their campus at Redwood Shores where they were hosting a Creator's Camp. Creators have been invited to spend the week exploring and creating content like Sims, houses, and customized content. The creators' work was used to pre-populate The Sims 3 Exchange. On May 8, 2009, Maxis announced that The Sims 3 had gone gold, meaning that the game had finished beta testing stage and was off for manufacturing ahead of its June 2009 release. On May 15, 2009, Maxis released several online interactive teaser experiences on The Sims 3 website, including SimFriend, which allows users to choose a virtual Sim Friend who would email them throughout the day; SimSocial, which allows users to create their own Sim online, and have an adventure with them; and SimSidekick, which allows users to surf the web with a sim. Two weeks before the game was scheduled to be released, an unauthorized copy of the digital distribution version of the game leaked onto the Internet. Maxis later commented that the leak was a "buggy, pre-final" version susceptible to crashes, and that more than half of the game was missing. Reportedly, the title saw higher copyright infringement rates than that of the most torrented game of 2008, Spore, also developed by Maxis.

Maxis relied on user feedback from previous games. In order to make the game's animations look believable but goofy, the team shot real life references of people doing tasks in outrageous ways until satisfied with the outcome. Each character in the game was specifically created by the developers to have their own life story, wishes, dreams, and personalities. The developers spent a lot of time trying to get the world to feel seamless and the characters to feel real.

=== Marketing ===
On October 31, 2008, two teaser trailers were released by Electronic Arts featuring a comical view on the 2008 United States presidential election in the United States. Candidates John McCain and Barack Obama were included along with respective running mates Sarah Palin and Joe Biden. In April 2009, Electronic Arts began to post billboards in many areas in advertisement for the game. Many of the billboards covered skyscrapers in densely populated areas, most notably Times Square in New York City. The costs of these billboards was estimated to be $10 million a month. On March 23, 2009, The Sims 3 was threaded throughout the storyline of an episode of One Tree Hill.

On April 19, 2009, Target released a promotional disc of The Sims 3 that features a Ladytron band poster, The Sims 3 theme song music download, and a $5 off coupon. The main menu includes screensaver downloads, videos, Create-a-Sim, Create-A-House, and much more. There is no actual gameplay involved, but it describes what playing feels like. On July 14, 2010, Ford began a promotion at The Sims 3 Store by allowing players to download their newest car at the time, the Ford Fiesta Mark VII. The car also came with a collection of street signs. On October 27, 2010, the download was updated to include the Fiesta Hatchback. The 2012 Ford Focus was made available to download on June 8, 2011. The car included one male Ford T-shirt, one female Ford T-shirt, a stereo, and a set of neon lights, all for use in-game. The Focus pack was available to download on Mac, PC, Xbox, and PlayStation platforms.

In 2012, EA partnered with American singer Katy Perry to promote The Sims 3. As part of the promotion, a special Katy Perry Collector's Edition of the Showtime expansion pack was released, as well as the limited edition Katy Perry's Sweet Treats stuff pack. Both packs incorporate concept elements from Perry's third studio album Teenage Dream (2010), with the latter including a Simlish rendition of the album's fifth single, "Last Friday Night (T.G.I.F.)", in the in-game radio.

=== Audio ===
Music for The Sims 3 was composed by Steve Jablonsky. Scores were recorded with the Hollywood Studio Symphony at Newman Scoring Stage at 20th Century Fox. Music for the game's stereo and guitar objects was produced by others, including Ladytron, Darrell Brown, Rebeca Mauleon, and Peppino D'Agostino. Additional music was produced by APM Music. Two soundtracks have been released for The Sims 3 base game: The Sims 3 Soundtrack and The Sims 3 – Stereo Jams. The soundtrack includes theme music and the Stereo Jams album includes music from stereos in game. All songs on Stereo Jams are in Simlish, the language of Sims. Several musical artists partnered with EA to perform some of their songs in Simlish. Artists have ranged from Katy Perry, Lady Antebellum, Flaming Lips, Damien Marley, Depeche Mode, Nelly Furtado, and Flo Rida.

=== Release ===
On February 3, 2009, it was announced that the release date of The Sims 3 would be delayed from February 20, 2009, to June 2, 2009, in the United States, and June 5, 2009, in the United Kingdom. EA Singapore launched The Sims 3 with a large launch party, which was held on June 2, 2009, at the Bugis+ shopping mall in Singapore. At the event, The Sims 3 T-shirts were available for purchase. In Sydney, Australia on June 4, 2009, a fashion event to show off the freedom and self-expression in The Sims 3 was held by Electronic Arts Australia, and included a performance by Jessica Mauboy.

The game was released as both a standard edition and a Collector's Edition. Both the Collector's Edition and the standard edition of the game comes with a coupon for 1000 Sim Points to spend at The Sims 3 Store. The standard edition contains the first release of the core game, while the Collector's Edition includes the Sims 3 core game, a 2 GB The Sims Plumbob flash drive (the USB flash drive is preloaded with wallpapers and screensavers of the game, and the main theme as an MP3 file) with matching Green Carabiner, an exclusive European-styled Sports Car download, a Prima Tips and Hints Guide (not the actual Sims 3 Prima Guide), and Plumbob stickers. Those that pre-ordered the game also got a Vintage Sports Car download, The Sims 3 Neighborhood Poster, and a quick start reference guide. A preview CD with more information about The Sims 3, such as music samples, family descriptions, and career information, was also released.

When the game was released on June 2, 2009, it featured both versions for Microsoft Windows and Mac OS X on the same disc, unlike the previous games in The Sims series, which were ported to Mac by Aspyr and released several months later after the initial release date. The Mac version was created with the help of Transgaming, Inc., who licensed Cider to developers in order to make their games Mac compatible by emulating Windows APIs. Playing the game on Mac often results in poorer performance than in Windows, especially on higher-end systems. As it is a 32-bit application, it is not compatible with macOS Catalina or later. On October 2, 2019, Maxis announced that they would release an updated 64-bit version of the game, titled The Sims 3 (64-Bit & Metal), with compatibility for Mac OS X Catalina or later. Players who register the game on Origin would get the new version for free. The Sims 3 (64-Bit & Metal) was released on October 28, 2020.

=== Game engine ===
The Sims 3 uses a heavily modified version of Criterion's RenderWare as game engine for the PC release, that was adapted to have better simulation and data stream for the open world.

== Ports ==
=== Mobile ===
A player editing a Sim in Create-a-Sim (3D mobile version)

A player conversation (Java mobile version)

The Sims 3 was also released on mobile platforms in two different versions concurrently with the PC release in June 2009. The touch-operated, 3D mobile version of The Sims 3 was first released for iOS (iPhone and iPod Touch), and works similar to that of the PC version. This version was later in 2010 also released for Android, Bada, Symbian (as The Sims 3 HD), Palm webOS and Windows Phone. A cursor-based, 2D mobile version of The Sims 3 with isometric graphics, was released for the Java (J2ME) platform. This version was also released on N-Gage 2.0 on July 14 of the same year, on BlackBerry App World and Windows Mobile in November that year.

In Create-a-Sim, instead of Lifetime Wishes, there are personas. Personas decide which lifetime wishes your sim will have, as a persona is the largest factor in a Sim's personality. Sims start out with a small house. The house can be expanded every five sim days if the player can afford it. There are four careers in the town: biology, politics, business, and culinary. As in the PC version, Sims can also learn skills. There are nearly 75 wishes in the game. When all of them are fulfilled, Sims unlock the criminal career and have the ability to purchase a car. In some events, such as appliances breaking down, the player must play a minigame to solve or do the action.

On November 6, 2009, EA announced the release of a vampire theme pack for the iPhone. The pack included Live it or Wear it Sets with Vampires and Werewolves, Castle and Campus Life themes. "Live it" sets contain car, furniture, decoration, wallpaper, and flooring. "Wear it" sets contain clothing, new CAS options, and hair styles.

A number of standalone expansion packs have been released for the mobile version of the game. The first was World Adventures, released in February 2010 for Java and April 2, 2010, for iPhone. World Adventures adds tombs, new challenges, personas, and careers, new places to explore (China, Egypt and France), clothes and new furniture. A second standalone expansion pack, Ambitions, was released on September 16, 2010. Ambitions added new skills (firefighting, painting, parenting and sports), new community buildings, and the ability to have children. The Supernatural expansion pack was released for the Java version in 2012 which is based around magical and gothic themes. Finally was the Winter Edition expansion pack released for Java.

=== Console ===
Developed by Edge of Reality, The Sims 3 was released to video game consoles on October 26, 2010, for PlayStation 3, Xbox 360, and Nintendo DS. It was later released for Wii on November 15, 2010, and Nintendo 3DS on March 25, 2011. The game allows the player to take on up to three friends in the Life Moments Game on the Wii, upload and download content on Xbox Live and PlayStation Network, including furnishings, houses, and player creations or experience a full life simulation on a handheld with Nintendo DS. Reviews for the game ranged from average to moderately positive. Sims can age and die, and life cycles can be disabled optionally. The Sims 3 features a new Karma system (similar to the influence system in The Sims 2). Sims can interact with child Sims around the neighborhood, or have children of their own. Unlike the PC version of the game, the console versions have loading times when moving from one area to another, and when accessing build/buy modes.

The PlayStation 3 and Xbox 360 versions received mostly positive reviews. On Metacritic, it holds an average score of 77 and 76 out of 100 on the PS3 and Xbox 360 versions, respectively. Game Informer gave the 360 and PS3 versions a 9/10, praising the new Karma system and The Exchange. GameSpot gave the game a 7/10, noting that "the game lacks fluidity, but is fun in its own right." In a positive review, IGN praised the game for its controls on consoles but said they were disappointed by the fact that there is only one town in the game, as well as bugs, including a glitch where the game will not save once a certain week has been reached. The Wii version received mixed reviews and was criticized by reviewers and players for poor performance and glitches due to the weaker Wii hardware.

== Expansions, add-ons, and editions ==
The Sims 3 was supported to several expansions, add-ons, and edition, including eleven expansion packs and nine stuff packs. Stuff packs only include new items, e.g. furniture, clothing, and hairstyles. They do not add any new functionality to the game. Stuff packs are compatible with both Windows and Mac OS X as with the main game and expansion packs.

=== Expansion packs ===
Name	Release date	Includes	Life State	New Careers
World Adventures	NA: November 17, 2009; EU: November 19, 2009; AU: November 20, 2009	Additions include new traits, items, and clothing. Features quests, tomb exploration at three new destinations, photography, new build functions including the basement tool, nectar, fireworks, shops, and vacation homes. New vacation worlds include Champs Les Sims (France), Al Simhara (Egypt), and Shang Simla (China).	Mummy	Nectar making (Self-employed, only if Ambitions installed)
Ambitions	NA: June 1, 2010; EU: June 3, 2010	Additions include new careers, skills, traits, and items. Features include being able to control specific Sim workplaces (professions and selected careers), laundry, a tattoo system, and skill-based self-employment. New world is Twinbrook.	SimBot (Robot)	Architectural Designer, Education, Firefighter, Ghost Hunter, Medical, Investigator, Stylist, Self-Employment for various base game and EP skills
Late Night	NA: October 26, 2010; EU: October 28, 2010	Additions include new careers, skills, traits, clothes and accessories, furniture, and cars. Features bars, night clubs, penthouse suites, hot tubs, subway portholes, elevators, breast and muscle definition sliders, Group, Band, Butler, zodiac signs, new swimming pool design tools, height adjustment for wall objects, and fountain tool. New world is Bridgeport.	Vampire (can be created in CAS if Supernatural is installed)	Film, Band Member
Generations	NA: May 31, 2011; EU: June 2, 2011	Additions include new playground equipment, mid-life crisis, new interactions, new traits, and new profession. Features pranks for kids and teens, body hair for males, new types of celebrations (i.e. birthday/teen/bachelor parties, weddings, slumber), memories, graduation ceremonies, prom, imaginative play, potions, spiral staircases, water slides, boarding schools, pillow fights, strollers, and canes for elders.	Imaginary Friend	Daycare
Pets	NA: October 18, 2011; EU: October 20, 2011	Two editions: Regular and "Limited Edition"; Additions include new pets, new animal, and sim traits, Create-A-Pet, new lifetime wishes and rewards, new interactions, new items, new venues and community locations, and new pet and sim skills. Features controllable animals (cats, dogs, and horses) and non-playable creatures, and pet contests. New world is Appaloosa Plains.	Cat, Dog, Horse, Unicorn	Equestrian
Showtime	NA: March 6, 2012; EU: March 8, 2012	Three editions: Regular, "Limited Edition", and "Katy Perry Collector's Edition". Additions include new stage performance careers (singer, acrobat, and magician), new objects (pool table, and golfing), new sim traits/lifetime wishes. Katy Perry edition includes downloadable stage venue, fruit-themed clothing, items, and stage props. Features social features, stage decoration, singing, gigs, new achievement system, and Simport, which allows importing and exporting of celebrity Sims. New world is Starlight Shores.	Genie (can be created in CAS if Supernatural is installed)	Singer, Acrobat, Magician
Supernatural	NA: September 4, 2012; EU: September 6, 2012	Three editions: Regular, "Limited Edition", and "Origin Decor Edition". Additions include new magical items (alchemy station, magic brooms and wands, and philosopher's stone, among others), new clothing options including wings, and new traits. Features supernatural life states including witches, werewolves, fairies, vampires, and zombies, creation of supernatural Sims directly in Create-a-Sim, lunar cycle, and beekeeping. New world is Moonlight Falls.	Vampire, Witch, Werewolf, Zombie, Fairy	Fortune Teller, Alchemist (self-employed, only if Ambitions installed)
Seasons	NA: November 13, 2012; EU: November 15, 2012	Three editions: Regular, "Limited Edition". and "Origin Exclusive Trick or Treat Costume Pack Edition". Additions include new hidden skills (skating, snowboarding, horseshoes, and ball fighting), new traits, seasonal celebrations, and seasons and holiday related activities and social interactions. Features weather, seasons, new outerwear clothing category, and new festivals and holidays.	Alien	Test Subject (Aliens Only)
University Life	NA: March 5, 2013; EU: March 7, 2013	Three editions: Regular, "Limited Edition", and "Origin Exclusive Pre-Order Edition". Additions include the ability to attend university at the college sub-neighborhood, new skills (Science, Photography, Social Networking, and Street Arts), new traits, social groups, new careers, and smart phone. New world is Sims University, which is similar to WA's vacation world system	PlantSim	Art Appraiser, Sports Agent, Video Game Developer
Island Paradise	NA: June 25, 2013; EU: June 27, 2013	Three editions: Regular, "Limited Edition". and "Origin Exclusive Pre-Order Edition". Additions and features include houseboats, resort management, island discovery, new modes of transportation on water, and water related activities (e.g. scuba diving, boating, water skiing, and windsurfing). New world is Isla Paradiso.	Mermaid	Lifeguard, Scuba Diver (self-employed)
Into the Future	NA: October 22, 2013; EU: October 24, 2013	Two editions: Regular and "Limited Edition". Additions and features include traveling to the future, ability to change the future from the present, building customizable robots (Plumbot), Create-a-Bot, new robot and sim traits, new skills (Advanced Technology, Bot Building, and Laser rhythm-a-con), and new careers. New future world is Oasis Landing.	Plumbot (Robot)	Astronomer, Bot Arena, Bot Building (self-employed)

=== Stuff packs ===
Name	Release date	Includes
High-End Loft Stuff (Note: Alternatively titled "Design and High-Tech Stuff")	NA: February 2, 2010; EU: February 4, 2010	High-end furnishings, mainly technology such as televisions, video game consoles, and computers, as well as postmodern designs of bookshelves, tables, and chairs. Three items from The Sims and The Sims 2 were reintroduced to celebrate the 10th anniversary of The Sims series.
Fast Lane Stuff	NA: September 7, 2010; EU: September 9, 2010	Four all‐new styles of fashions, furnishings, and vehicles: Racing, Intrigue, Rockabilly, and Classic Luxury.
Outdoor Living Stuff (Note: Alternatively titled "Garden Style Stuff")	NA: February 1, 2011; EU: February 3, 2011	Clothing, furnishings, and items centered on patio activities in two new styles: "Garden Terrace" features elegant wrought-iron pieces, while "Sunset on the Veranda" embraces the warmth of the outdoors.
Town Life Stuff	NA: July 26, 2011; EU: July 28, 2011	New casual outfits, hairstyles, and items. Features newly redesigned venues such as a school, cafe, and grocery store, as well as new community lots including a gym, park, laundromat, and library.
Master Suite Stuff	NA: January 24, 2012; EU: January 26, 2012	Luxurious bedroom and bathroom décor centered on romance and relaxation. New contemporary furnishings and intimate apparel themed for creating romantic master suites.
Katy Perry's Sweet Treats	NA: June 5, 2012; EU: June 7, 2012	New candy-themed décor, items, outfits, hairstyles, and community lots. Features a Simlish version of Katy Perry's song "Last Friday Night (T.G.I.F.)".
Diesel Stuff	NA: July 10, 2012; EU: July 12, 2012	New clothing and décor from Diesel.
70s, 80s, & 90s Stuff (Note: Alternatively titled "Decades Stuff")	NA: January 22, 2013; EU: January 24, 2013	Outfits, hairstyles, and items modeled on those of the 1970s, 1980s, and 1990s.
Movie Stuff	NA: September 10, 2013; EU: September 12, 2013	Clothing and décor inspired by iconic movie themes and settings.

=== Editions ===
Name	Release date	Includes
The Sims 3	NA: June 2, 2009; EU: June 4, 2009	Core game on DVD.
The Sims 3 Collector's Edition	NA: June 2, 2009; EU: June 4, 2009	Core game on DVD, a Sims 3 plumbob-styled 2 GB USB flash drive, and an exclusive download of in-game European styled sports car.
The Sims 3 Holiday Collector's Edition	EU: December 3, 2009	Core game on DVD, The Sims 3 Christmas theme song, six Christmas-themed in-game items, The Sims 3 Christmas-themed wallpaper and exclusive download of in-game European styled sports car.
The Sims 3 Commemorative Edition	EU: June 4, 2010	Core game on DVD, 48-page hardback book, wall poster, sketch book of artwork, and access to additional in-game items.
The Sims 3 Deluxe	NA: September 28, 2010	Core game and The Sims 3: Ambitions.
The Sims 3 Starter Pack	NA: May 14, 2013; EU: May 16, 2013	Core game, The Sims 3: Late Night, The Sims 3: High End Loft Stuff, and additional downloadable content.

== Reception ==
=== Reviews ===
Reception

Aggregate scores
Aggregator	Score
GameRankings	87%
Metacritic	86/100

Review scores
Publication	Score
1Up.com	B+
Edge	8/10
Eurogamer	8/10
Game Informer	9/10
GamePro	4/5
GameSpot	9/10
GameSpy	4.5/5
GameTrailers	9/10
IGN	8.9/10
PC Gamer (UK)	9/10
Total PC Gaming	8/10

Response from critics and gamers alike were generally favorable, with Metacritic calculating a score of 86/100 based on 75 reviews. PC Gamer awarded The Sims 3 a 92% and an Editor's Choice badge, calling it "The best Sims game yet". IGN awarded the PC version of The Sims 3 an 8.9/10, stating: "This is simply a better playing Sims experience, and once you experience the freedom to hit the town without hitting a load screen you'll be hard-pressed to go back to any of the earlier games. Blowing up the size of the game was certainly a risk, but it was a sensible and overdue one, and kudos to EA for recognizing that the decade-old formula needed some growth. And while there's still plenty of room for more innovation, we'll settle for The Sims 3 for now. It delivers a solid foundation for what should be many more years of Sims sales dominance."

The Sims 3 received mostly positive reviews. GameSpot awarded The Sims 3 a score of 9.0/10, the review praised the game: "The latest Sims game is also the greatest, striking a terrific balance between the fresh and the familiar." The game was ranked No. 91 in IGN's "Top 100 Modern Games". In a special edition of Edge magazine listing their 100 top videogames of all time, The Sims 3 was No. 89 on the list.

Reviewing the Nintendo 3DS version, IGN gave it a 7.5 out of 10, saying "while some of the additions are welcome like the new graphics and interface, the removal of certain features like multiple saves, personality traits and calling for services is odd. ... Still, if you've never played a Sims game before, prepare to be addicted. Even though this version has some problems, the positives outweigh the negatives." During the 13th Annual Interactive Achievement Awards, the Academy of Interactive Arts & Sciences nominated The Sims 3 for "Strategy/Simulation Game of the Year".

=== Sales ===
EA reported that in its first week, The Sims 3 sold 1.4 million copies. According to EA, this was the most successful PC game launch the company had had to date. According to retail data trackers Gfk Australia, The Sims 3 has been the top selling game in Australia from release until June 30, 2009. The Sims 3 ended 2009 as the year's best selling PC game worldwide, and since its release has become one of the best-selling PC games of all time, having sold over ten million copies worldwide.
