= The Sims =

Series of video games

- The Sims series logo (since August 2026)
- Genres: Life simulation, social simulation
- Developer: Maxis
- Publisher: Electronic Arts
- Creator: Will Wright
- Platforms: Microsoft Windows, Mac OS, PlayStation 2, GameCube, Xbox, Game Boy Advance, Nintendo DS, PlayStation Portable, Java ME, BlackBerry OS, Bada, PlayStation 3, Xbox 360, Wii, Nintendo 3DS, macOS, PlayStation 4, Xbox One, Nintendo Switch, iOS, Android, Windows Phone
- First release: The Sims; February 4, 2000
- Latest release: The Sims 4: Royalty & Legacy; February 12, 2026
- Parent series: SimCity
- Spin-offs: See below

The Sims is a series of life simulation video games developed by Maxis and published by Electronic Arts (EA). The franchise has sold nearly 200 million copies worldwide, and is one of the best-selling video game series of all time. It is also part of the larger Sim series, started by SimCity in 1989.

The games in the Sims series are largely sandbox games, in that they lack any defined goals (except for some later expansion packs and console versions which introduced this gameplay style). The player creates virtual people called "Sims", places them in houses, and helps direct their moods and satisfy their desires. Players can either place their Sims in pre-constructed homes or build them themselves. Each successive expansion pack and game in the series augmented what the player could do with their Sims.

== Development ==
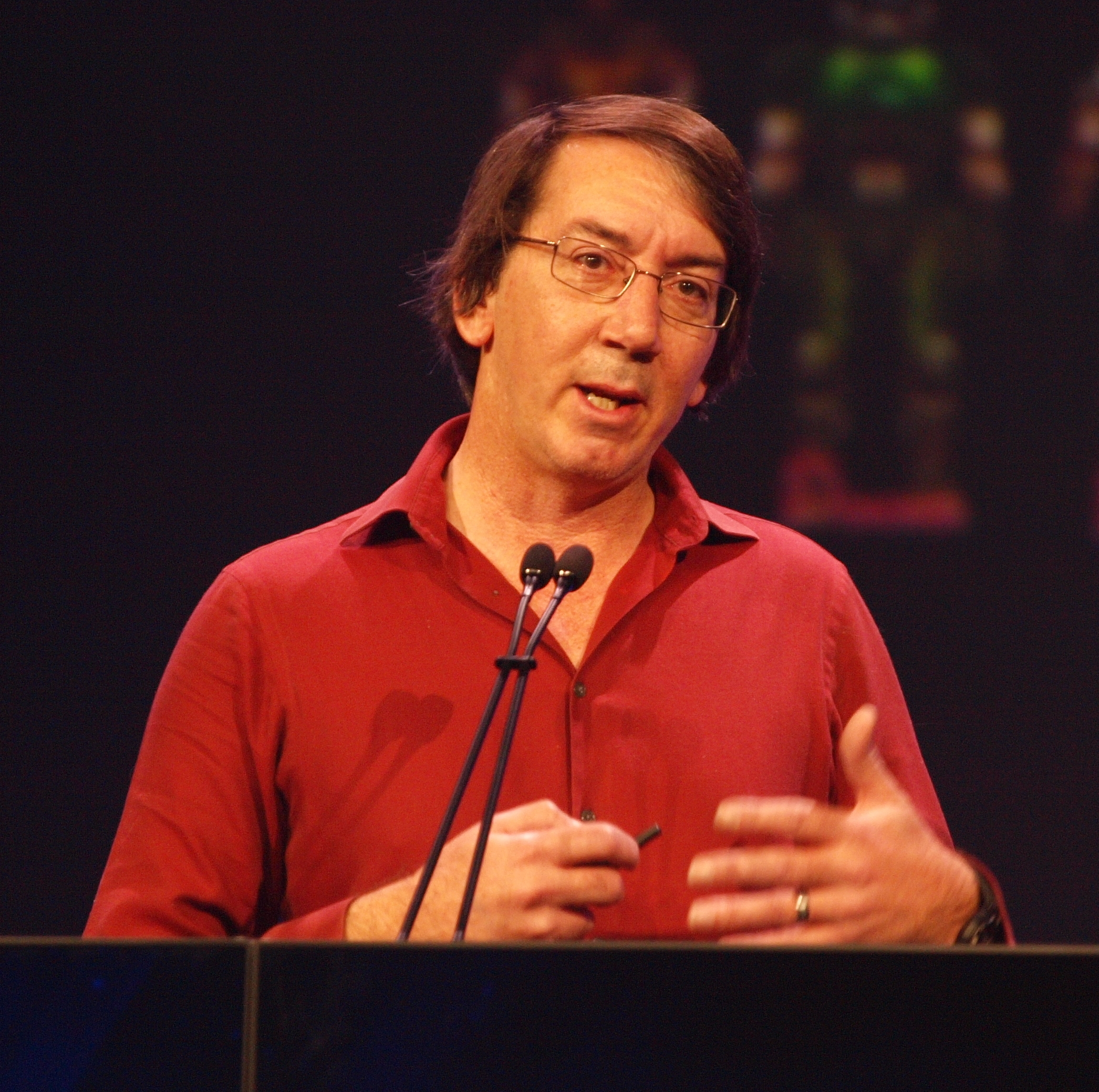
Will Wright in 2010

Game designer Will Wright was inspired to create a "virtual doll house" after losing his home during the Oakland firestorm of 1991 and subsequently rebuilding his life. Replacing his home and his other possessions made him think about adapting that life experience into a game. When Wright initially took his ideas to the Maxis board of directors, they were skeptical and gave little support or financing for the game. The directors at Electronic Arts, which bought Maxis in 1997, were more receptive—SimCity had been a great success for them, and they foresaw the possibility of building a strong Sim franchise.

Wright has stated that The Sims was meant as a satire of U.S. consumer culture. Wright took ideas from the 1977 architecture and urban design book A Pattern Language, American psychologist Abraham Maslow's 1943 paper A Theory of Human Motivation and his hierarchy of needs, and Charles Hampden-Turner's Maps of the Mind to develop a model for the game's artificial intelligence.

== Games ==
Release timeline Main series in bold
| 2000 | **The Sims** |
2001
| 2002 | The Sims Online |
2003
| 2004 | **The Sims 2** |
2005
2006
| 2007 | The Sims Life Stories |
| 2007 | The Sims Pet Stories |
| 2008 | The Sims Castaway Stories |
| 2009 | **The Sims 3** |
2010
| 2011 | The Sims Medieval |
| 2011 | The Sims Social |
2012
2013
| 2014 | **The Sims 4** |

=== Main series ===
==== The Sims (2000) ====
The Sims was the first game in the series. Developed by Maxis and published by Electronic Arts, it was released for Microsoft Windows on February 4, 2000. The game used dimetric projection and featured open-ended simulation of the daily activities of one or more virtual people ("Sims") in a suburban area near SimCity. Between 2000 and 2003, seven expansion packs were released. The Sims was rereleased in numerous different deluxe editions, compilations, and formats. By March 22, 2002, The Sims had sold more than 6.3 million copies worldwide, surpassing Myst as the best-selling PC game in history at the time. By February 2005, the game had shipped 16 million copies worldwide.

The Sims received seven expansion packs:

1. Livin' Large
2. House Party
3. Hot Date
4. Vacation
5. Unleashed
6. Superstar
7. Makin' Magic

The Sims was re-released for Windows 10 and 11 on January 31, 2025, as part of The Sims franchise's twenty-fifth birthday celebration as The Sims Legacy Collection. The Sims Legacy Collection includes all original seven expansion packs.

==== The Sims 2 (2004) ====
Electronic Arts released The Sims 2 on September 14, 2004. The sequel, developed by Maxis, takes place in a full 3D environment as opposed to the dimetric projection of the original game. Sims age through six (seven with expansions) life stages, from infancy to old age and subsequent death. Another major feature is the aspiration system. Each Sim exhibits wants and fears according to their aspiration and personality. Consequently, the level of the aspiration meter determines the effectiveness of a Sim at completing tasks. The fulfillment of wants provides aspiration points, which can be used to purchase aspiration rewards. The game also features clear days of the week, with weekends when children can stay home from school and vacation days when adults can take time off work.

The Sims 2 is set some 25 years after the original game. For instance, the Goth family has aged significantly with Bella Goth mysteriously vanishing at some point in the 25 years. Because the entire game has progressed from 2D sprites to 3D models, all content in The Sims 2 had to be created from the ground up. Due to this, The Sims 2 was not made backward-compatible with any content from the first generation of the main series; however, some objects and features from the original series were remade for the sequel.

Eight expansion packs and nine "stuff packs" were released for The Sims 2. Over 400 items were also released for the game via The Sims 2 Store. The Sims 2 received eight expansion packs:

1. University
2. Nightlife
3. Open for Business
4. Pets
5. Seasons
6. Bon Voyage
7. FreeTime
8. Apartment Life

The Sims 2 was re-released for Windows 10 and 11 on January 31, 2025, as part of The Sims franchise's twenty-fifth birthday celebration as The Sims 2 Legacy Collection. The Sims 2 Legacy Collection includes all original eight expansion packs and nine stuff packs.

==== The Sims 3 (2009) ====
Electronic Arts released The Sims 3 on June 2, 2009. The sequel was announced by EA in November 2006. The game is set some time before the original game and features an open, seamless neighborhood, improved Sim creation tools, enhanced build and buy mode functions, and the introduction of wishes and goals. The game introduced a new form of directed gameplay through small, step-wise goals presented as opportunities for the player to pursue or refuse. The Sims 3 sold 1.4 million copies in the first week, making it the largest release in PC gaming history at the time.

The Sims 3 is set before The Sims. For example, the Goth family is much younger, and Bella Goth, an adult in the first game, is a child and is named Bella Bachelor. Some players speculate that the game takes place 25 years before the original game, the same way The Sims 2 takes place 25 years after The Sims. Eleven expansion packs and nine "stuff packs" were released for The Sims 3. In addition, many items are available online for additional fees at The Sims 3 Store. The Sims 3 received eleven expansion packs:

1. World Adventures
2. Ambitions
3. Late Night
4. Generations
5. Pets
6. Showtime
7. Supernatural
8. Seasons
9. University Life
10. Island Paradise
11. Into the Future

==== The Sims 4 (2014) ====
Electronic Arts announced The Sims 4 on May 6, 2013. The announcement stated that the game was in development by Maxis. The Sims 4 takes place in an alternative setting/timeline from the game's previous installments. Later in 2014, further details on features and gameplay were announced. The release date of September 2, 2014, was announced at E3 2014. As of February 2026, 21 "expansion packs", 12 "game packs", 20 "stuff packs", 44 "kits", and 11 "creator kits" have been released. Additionally, base game updates have added content that was previously absent, such as basements, ghosts, pools, modular stairs, toddlers, new careers, terrain tools, more skin tones, bunk beds, and infants. The Sims 4 was made free-to-play on October 18, 2022.

The Sims 4 has received twenty-one expansion packs:

1. Get to Work
2. Get Together
3. City Living
4. Cats & Dogs
5. Seasons
6. Get Famous
7. Island Living
8. Discover University
9. Eco Lifestyle
10. Snowy Escape
11. Cottage Living
12. High School Years
13. Growing Together
14. Horse Ranch
15. For Rent
16. Lovestruck
17. Life & Death
18. Businesses & Hobbies
19. Enchanted By Nature
20. Adventure Awaits
21. Royalty & Legacy

The Sims 4 has received twelve game packs:

1. Outdoor Retreat
2. Spa Day
3. Dine Out
4. Vampires
5. Parenthood
6. Jungle Adventure
7. StrangerVille
8. Realm of Magic
9. Star Wars: Journey to Batuu
10. Dream Home Decorator
11. My Wedding Stories
12. Werewolves

==== Project Rene (TBA) ====
On October 18, 2022, Maxis announced that they are working on the next installment of The Sims, which is code-named Project Rene. The game allows solo or collaborative play and cross-play. Room customization works differently compared to The Sims 4, with more customization options being presented for furniture. In this project, the buy-and-build mode is multiplayer and players can customize the buildings at the same time.

As of July 2024, Project Rene is continuing development, with potential plans for "closed invites to small public playtests or early access options" for interested players. That same year, Maxis stated that Project Rene would co-exist alongside The Sims 4, with both continuing development in the future. This is a deviation from past installments in The Sims franchise, where one installment typically replaces the previous. In addition, it was stated that Project Rene will be free-to-play and not require "a subscription, core game purchase or energy mechanics".

Continuing its deviance from past installments in The Sims, Project Rene will have additional in-game purchases. Maxis stated there is "a plan to change this up a bit. For example, basic weather may be added to the core game for free, for everybody... It's important that with 'Project Rene' we lower barriers to play and give all players the broadest shared systems because that feels like the strongest foundation for us to grow from." This diversion from the typical purchase-structure follows The Sims 4, which was made free-to-play in October 2022.

In September 2024, EA vice president Kate Gorman confirmed that Project Rene will not be a direct replacement or sequel to The Sims 4 but a separate project within The Sims franchise, reiterating that The Sims 4 would continue to receive updates and new content in the years to come.

==== PC spin-offs ====
===== The Sims Online =====
In December 2002, Electronic Arts released the Maxis-developed The Sims Online, later named EA Land. It recreates The Sims as a massively multiplayer online game, where human players can interact with each other. The spin-off did not achieve the same level of success as the original. Reviews for The Sims Online were lackluster; many likening its experience to an enormous chat room. On August 1, 2008, EA Land was shut down.

===== The Sims Stories =====
The Sims Stories is a series of video games from The Sims series released in 2007–2008 based on a modified version of The Sims 2 game engine. The modified engine is optimized for play on systems with weaker specifications, such as laptops. In addition to a Free Play mode with classic, open-ended gameplay, the games contain a structured, linear story mode where players are required to complete a series of goals to progress in the storyline. Three games were released in the series.

===== The Sims Carnival =====
The Sims Carnival was a casual game brand of The Sims. It had two separate product lines; the first was an online community of crowd-sourced web games and the second was a line of packaged game titles sold via retail stores and digital downloads.

===== The Sims Medieval =====
The Sims Medieval is an action role-playing spin-off game released in 2011. It is set in medieval times, and although it is based on The Sims 3 engine, it plays very differently. The Sims Medieval has one expansion pack, Pirates and Nobles.

===== The Sims Social =====
Launched in August 2011, The Sims Social was a Flash-based game developed by Playfish for Facebook. EA announced the game was upgraded from Beta to Live status in a press release issued on August 23, 2011. The game was shut down and removed from Facebook on June 14, 2013.

=== Console, handheld, and mobile releases ===
Release timeline Main series in bold
| 2003 | **The Sims** |
| 2003 | The Sims Bustin' Out |
| 2004 | The Urbz: Sims in the City |
| 2005 | **The Sims 2** |
| 2006 | The Sims 2: Pets |
| 2007 | MySims |
| 2007 | The Sims 2: Castaway |
| 2007 | The Sims: Bowling |
| 2007 | The Sims: Pool |
| 2008 | The Sims 2: Apartment Pets |
| 2008 | MySims Kingdom |
| 2008 | The Sims: DJ |
| 2009 | MySims Party |
| 2009 | MySims Racing |
| 2009 | MySims Agents |
| 2010 | MySims Puzzle Party |
| 2010 | **The Sims 3** |
| 2010 | The Sims 3: World Adventures |
| 2010 | The Sims 3: Ambitions |
| 2010 | MySims SkyHeroes |
| 2011 | The Sims 3: Pets |
| 2011 | The Sims 3: Supernatural |
| 2011 | The Sims FreePlay |
2012
2013
| 2014 | **The Sims 4** |
2015
2016
2017
| 2018 | The Sims Mobile |

==== The Sims era ====
The Sims was the game's first console release and shares the same name as the PC game. It was released in 2003 for the PlayStation 2, Xbox, and Nintendo GameCube. The gameplay is similar to the PC version but follows a mission-based storyline in addition to the sandbox mode found in the original game. Objectives are added which allow the player to unlock new furniture and locations.

The Sims Bustin' Out is the second title in The Sims console series. Bustin' Out was released in the fourth quarter of 2003 for the PlayStation 2, Xbox, and Nintendo GameCube. Much like its predecessor, the game features two modes: Bust Out Mode, which is mission-based gameplay, and Freeplay Mode which is similar to the original The Sims PC game. The PlayStation 2 version featured the option to play online, though EA no longer supports it. Separate handheld versions were developed for the Game Boy Advance and N-Gage, which allow the player to directly control the Sim character for the first time.

The Urbz: Sims in the City is a game focused on Sims living in an urban setting within Sim City. The player must earn a reputation and complete tasks for characters. It was released for Xbox, PlayStation 2, and Nintendo GameCube. It features Black Eyed Peas as NPCs. Like The Sims Bustin' Out, separate handheld versions were developed for the Nintendo DS and the Game Boy Advance, which serve as a sequel to their predecessors.

==== The Sims 2 ====
The Sims 2, The Sims 2: Pets, and The Sims 2: Castaway were released for various platforms including the Wii, PlayStation 2, PSP, Xbox, and Nintendo DS systems. The Sims 2: Apartment Pets was only released for the Nintendo DS. EA also released several spin-off The Sims titles for the iPod Nano (3rd and 4th generation), the iPod Classic, and the iPod (5th generation). Some of these titles include: The Sims Bowling, The Sims DJ, and The Sims Pool.

==== MySims ====
MySims is a series of console games created by EA for the Wii and Nintendo DS (with SkyHeroes being the exception). They feature Chibi-like characters, similar to the Wii's Mii avatars. The first game in the series was released in September 2007. MySims SkyHeroes, the newest addition to the MySims line of games, was released in September 2010. A mobile spin-off game, MySims Puzzle Party, was released exclusively in South Korea in January 2010.

==== The Sims 3 ====
The Sims 3, The Sims 3: World Adventures, and The Sims 3: Ambitions were released for iOS and other mobile devices. The Sims 3 was also released for Android, PlayStation 3, Xbox 360, Nintendo DS, Wii, and Nintendo 3DS. The 3DS version of the game was a launch title for the console. The Sims 3: Pets was released for PlayStation 3, Xbox 360, and Nintendo 3DS. The Sims 3: Supernatural and The Sims 3: Winter Edition were released for Java.

==== The Sims 4 ====
Versions for the PlayStation 4 and Xbox One consoles were released on November 17, 2017. Unlike previous console ports, the console version of The Sims 4 has feature parity with the PC/Mac version, and also shares the same "expansion packs", "game packs", "stuff packs", and "kits".

==== The Sims FreePlay ====
The Sims FreePlay is the first free-to-play version of The Sims, and was released worldwide on December 15, 2011, for iOS devices, and on February 15, 2012, for Android. The game made it to Kindle Fire in October 2012, to BlackBerry 10 on July 31, 2013, and Windows Phone 8 in September 2013. Unlike other Sims games, The Sims FreePlay runs in real-time and takes real-time to complete actions. Players can progress through 55 levels and unlock new content, create up to 34 Sims, build town map buildings, and complete goals to earn Lifestyle Points, Simoleons, Social Points, and XP (Experience Points). All of these (except for Social Points) can be obtained by baking, planting, going to school (only for preteens and teens), or working. To get Social Points, players will have to go to neighboring houses or add their Facebook friends.

==== The Sims Mobile ====
The Sims Mobile is the second free-to-play version of The Sims for Android and iOS, The Sims Mobile was announced on May 9, 2017, in a launch trailer with a soft launch for Brazil, and was released worldwide on March 6, 2018. It features multiplayer and story-mode elements in an attempt to offer a playing experience akin to the main Sims installments. On October 19, 2025, EA announced that The Sims Mobile would be shut down on January 20, 2026. The game was delisted from both the Apple App Store and Google Play Store on October 21, 2025, however remained playable to those who downloaded the game before it was delisted.

=== Canceled ===
==== SimsVille ====
SimsVille was a planned spin-off combining the life-simulation elements of The Sims with the city-building gameplay of SimCity. First announced in August 2000, the game was canceled a year later in September 2001 due to quality control issues, with the team citing concerns that the gameplay became "less compelling" once cities were constructed.

==== The Urbz: Sims in the City sequel ====
The Urbz: Sims in the City was intended to be the beginning of a spin-off series for The Sims. However, due to disappointing sales, both a sequel and a PC port of the game were canceled. The sequel was eventually reworked into the console version of The Sims 2.

==== The Sims: Town Stories ====
In October 2024, footage of a previously unannounced mobile game titled The Sims Labs: Town Stories was leaked online from a playtest. The game was set in the town of Plumbrook and featured gameplay similar to other mobile titles such as Gardenscapes, with players completing quests and match-3 mini-games to collect resources used to build houses. In November 2025, the game was officially soft-launched in the Philippines, Australia, and South Africa. In March 2026, former designer Franci Dimitrovska revealed that the game's worldwide release was canceled and the development team had been laid off.

== Legacy ==
The success of The Sims has resulted in Guinness World Records awarding the series numerous world records, including, as of 2017, "Most Expansion Packs for a Videogame Series" and "Best Selling PC Game Series", with sales estimates ranging from 36 to 50 million units. The series ranks 10th among the best-selling video game franchises of all times, with a sales figure of over 200 million combining all the entries in the series. As of October 2019, all The Sims games combined generated lifetime sales of more than US$5 billion.

=== Film ===
A live-action drama film based upon the franchise was announced in 2007. Film rights to The Sims had been purchased by 20th Century Fox in the same year. It was to be written by Brian Lynch and produced by John Davis, and the film remained in development hell for a number of years. In 2019, following the acquisition of 21st Century Fox by Disney, the film along with numerous other video game-based movies in development at Fox were canceled.

In April 2020, it was announced a live action film of The Sims and SimCity were in development at Legendary Entertainment, with the latter having the script be penned by Mike Rosillio.

In March 2024, it was announced that LuckyChap Entertainment and Vertigo Entertainment are set to produce a Sims film with Kate Herron as director and co-writer alongside Briony Redman. This was further confirmed by EA in September 2024, who announced that the film will be produced in collaboration with Amazon MGM Studios. EA vice president and general manager of The Sims Kate Gorman cited Barbie (2023) as an inspiration, stating that they want to "make an impact the size of something like a Barbie movie". Margot Robbie, who starred in Barbie, is a co-founder of LuckyChap Entertainment.

=== Reality television show ===
EA, in partnership with Turner Sports and BuzzFeed, created The Sims Spark'd, a four-episode reality competition television show that premiered on the TBS network on July 17, 2020. The series, filmed from December 9 to 14, 2019, features 12 contestants, selected from those known to feature The Sims in their online gaming channels, tasked with challenges within The Sims 4 to create characters and stories following the challenge's themes and limitations. Each competitors creation is judged by a panel consisting of YouTube personality Kelsey Impicciche, singer and songwriter Tayla Parx, and EA Maxis developer Dave Miotke, with the finalist winning a US$100,000 prize. The show is hosted by American Idol season 14 finalist Rayvon Owen.

=== Electronic Literature ===
Janet Murray, in the revised edition of Hamlet on the Holodeck, describes Sims stories as a variety of writing akin to scrap-booking. Tegan Pyke has explored how these Sims stories consider literary practices, including electronic literature. Pyke contends that these stories "are a variety of born-digital literary works."

== See also ==
- List of best-selling PC games
- List of best-selling video game franchises
- List of Sims video games
- List of The Sims video games
