= List of programs broadcast by TLC =

List of television programs

This is a list of television programs formerly or currently broadcast by TLC.

== Current programming ==
- 1000-lb Roomies (2025–present)
- 1000-lb Sisters (2020–present)
- 7 Little Johnstons (2015–present)
- 90 Day: Hunt for Love (2025–present)
- 90 Day: The Last Resort (2023–present)
- 90 Day: The Single Life (2021–present)
- 90 Day Diaries (2022–present)
- 90 Day Fiancé (2014–present)
- 90 Day Fiancé: Before the 90 Days (2017–present)
- 90 Day Fiancé: Happily Ever After? (2016–present)
- 90 Day Fiancé: The Other Way (2019–present)
- 90 Day Fiancé: Pillow Talk (2019–present)
- About Face (2025–present)
- Bad Foot Clinic (2026–present)
- Baylen Out Loud (2025–present)
- Body Bizarre (2026–present)
- Dangerously Obese (2025–present)
- Double Lives of Suburban Wives (2026–present)
- ER: Caught on Camera (2026–present)
- The Face Doctors (2026–present)
- Jay & Pamela (2025–present)
- Little Singles (2026–present)
- Most Extreme Humans (2026–present)
- My Big Fat Fabulous Life (2015-present)
- My Strange Addiction (2010-15, 2026–present)
- One Day In My Body (2026–present)
- Save My Skin (2020-23, 2026–present)
- Seeking Sister Wife (2018-present)
- Sister Wives (2010–present)
- Suddenly Amish (2026–present)
- Unexpected (2017–present)
- Untold Stories of the E.R. (2004-20, 2026-present)
- Welcome to Plathville (2019–present)

== Former programming ==
=== Original programming ===
| Title | First aired | Last aired | Final season | References |
|---|---|---|---|---|
| 10 Years Younger | December 1, 2004 | March 27, 2009 | 4 | |
| 19 Kids and Counting | September 29, 2008 | May 19, 2015 | 10 | |
| 90 Day Fiancé: B90 Strikes Back! | June 22, 2020 | September 28, 2020 | 1 | |
| 90 Day Fiancé: HEA Strikes Back! | October 5, 2020 | December 21, 2020 | 1 | |
| 90 Day Fiancé: Love in Paradise | July 18, 2021 | June 24, 2024 | 4 | |
| 90 Day Fiancé: Self-Quarantined | April 20, 2020 | June 1, 2020 | 1 | |
| 1000-lb Best Friends | February 7, 2022 | December 17, 2024 | 3 | |
| A Baby Story | January 1, 1998 | August 29, 2007 | 9 | |
| A Model Life | July 13, 2007 | August 31, 2007 | 1 | |
| Abby & Brittany | August 28, 2012 | October 2, 2012 | 1 | |
| The Adam Carolla Project | October 5, 2005 | December 20, 2005 | 1 | |
| Addicted | March 17, 2010 | April 21, 2010 | 1 | |
| Addicted to Marriage | November 16, 2021 | December 21, 2021 | 1 | |
| Alaskan Women Looking for Love | October 16, 2013 | November 10, 2013 | 1 | |
| All About Sex | January 10, 2015 | February 14, 2015 | 1 | |
| All-American Muslim | November 13, 2011 | January 8, 2012 | 1 | |
| America's Worst Tattoos | June 21, 2012 | April 21, 2014 | 2 | |
| American Hot Rod | January 13, 2004 | September 27, 2007 | 5 | |
| Awake Surgery | December 14, 2022 | December 21, 2022 | 1 | |
| Baby Surgeons: Delivering Miracles | August 17, 2022 | October 12, 2022 | 1 | |
| Bad Hair Day | August 24, 2022 | September 28, 2022 | 1 | |
| The Baldwins | February 23, 2025 | April 13, 2025 | 1 | |
| Ballroom Bootcamp | October 7, 2005 | January 26, 2007 | 2 | |
| BBQ Pitmasters | December 3, 2009 | September 23, 2010 | 2 | |
| Best Funeral Ever | January 6, 2013 | May 26, 2014 | 2 | |
| Big Hair Alaska | September 20, 2011 | | 1 | |
| Big Medicine | May 28, 2007 | March 5, 2008 | 2 | |
| Big Sexy | August 30, 2011 | September 13, 2011 | 1 | |
| The Blended Bunch | March 16, 2021 | April 20, 2021 | 1 | |
| Body Parts | April 6, 2022 | April 20, 2022 | 1 | |
| Botched Bariatrics | May 15, 2024 | May 29, 2024 | 1 | |
| Breaking Amish | September 9, 2012 | November 20, 2014 | 4 | |
| Breaking Amish: Brave New World | May 12, 2013 | July 14, 2013 | 1 | |
| Buying Naked | June 28, 2014 | July 19, 2014 | 1 | |
| Cake Boss | April 19, 2009 | December 2, 2017 | 13 | (Note: The series moved to Discovery Family on May 18, 2019.) |
| Cheer Perfection | December 19, 2012 | October 16, 2013 | 2 | |
| Clean Sweep | September 13, 2003 | September 27, 2005 | 2 | |
| Counting On | December 13, 2015 | September 22, 2020 | 11 | |
| Crack Addicts | May 24, 2023 | June 7, 2023 | 1 | |
| Craft Wars | June 26, 2012 | August 21, 2012 | 1 | |
| The Culpo Sisters | November 7, 2022 | December 5, 2022 | 1 | |
| Darcey & Stacey | August 16, 2020 | April 10, 2023 | 4 | |
| David and Annie: After the 90 Days | January 10, 2022 | February 13, 2023 | 2 | |
| DC Cupcakes | July 16, 2010 | July 1, 2013 | 3 | |
| Doubling Down with the Derricos | August 11, 2020 | July 2, 2024 | 5 | |
| Dr. Mercy | September 22, 2021 | October 27, 2021 | 1 | |
| Dr. Pimple Popper | January 3, 2018 | August 23, 2023 | 9 | |
| Dr. Pimple Popper: Before the Pop | September 3, 2020 | October 29, 2020 | 1 | |
| Dragnificent! | April 19, 2020 | May 18, 2020 | 1 | |
| Drew and Linda Say I Do | June 2, 2018 | June 2, 2018 | 1 | |
| DUI | December 1, 2011 | July 12, 2012 | 1 | |
| Earth's Fury | February 23, 1997 | November 16, 1998 | 2 | |
| Extreme Cheapskates | October 16, 2012 | November 19, 2014 | 3 | |
| Extreme Cougar Wives | November 25, 2012 | August 21, 2013 | 1 | |
| Extreme Couponing | December 29, 2010 | December 4, 2012 | 5 | |
| Extreme Sisters | April 25, 2021 | March 27, 2023 | 2 | |
| The Family Chantel | July 22, 2019 | December 11, 2023 | 5 | |
| Family S.O.S. with Jo Frost | May 28, 2013 | July 2, 2013 | 1 | |
| Fashionably Late with Stacy London | November 23, 2007 | December 28, 2007 | 1 | |
| Find Love Live | May 10, 2020 | August 17, 2020 | 1 | |
| Flip That House | July 14, 2005 | October 18, 2008 | 4 | |
| Forbidden Love | July 21, 2024 | September 8, 2024 | 1 | |
| Forensic Files | April 23, 1996 | December 29, 1999 | 4 | |
| Freaky Eaters | September 5, 2010 | June 26, 2011 | 2 | |
| The Good Buy Girls | June 5, 2013 | May 16, 2014 | 1 | |
| Great Books | September 8, 1993 | June 20, 2006 | | |
| Gypsy Sisters | February 10, 2013 | July 19, 2015 | 4 | |
| Here Comes Honey Boo Boo | August 8, 2012 | August 14, 2014 | 4 | |
| Hoarding: Buried Alive | March 14, 2010 | April 2, 2014 | 5 | |
| Hodges Half Dozen | November 7, 2017 | December 12, 2017 | 1 | |
| Homemade Millionaire | November 19, 2010 | December 24, 2010 | 1 | |
| Hot & Heavy | January 7, 2020 | January 21, 2020 | 1 | |
| I Am Jazz | July 15, 2015 | February 28, 2023 | 8 | |
| I Am Shauna Rae | January 11, 2022 | January 3, 2023 | 2 | |
| I Didn't Know I Was Pregnant | May 26, 2009 | October 19, 2011 | 4 | |
| I Found the Gown | August 24, 2012 | July 1, 2014 | 3 | |
| I Kid with Brad Garrett | June 28, 2011 | August 2, 2011 | 1 | |
| I Love a Mama's Boy | October 25, 2020 | November 25, 2024 | 4 | |
| I Want THAT Wedding | June 9, 2018 | July 14, 2018 | 1 | |
| In a Fix | January 17, 2004 | June 18, 2005 | 2 | |
| Inedible to Incredible | June 21, 2010 | July 12, 2010 | 1 | |
| Junkyard Wars | January 3, 2001 | April 30, 2003 | 5 | |
| Kate Plus 8 | April 10, 2007 | July 24, 2017 | 11 | |
| Kate Plus Date | June 10, 2019 | July 15, 2019 | 1 | |
| Kids by the Dozen | January 15, 2007 | November 12, 2007 | 2 | |
| Kindred Spirits | October 21, 2016 | October 27, 2017 | 2 | |
| King of the Crown | September 30, 2009 | November 6, 2009 | 1 | |
| Kitchen Boss | January 25, 2011 | April 2, 2012 | 2 | |
| LA Ink | August 7, 2007 | September 15, 2011 | 4 | |
| Labor Games | May 6, 2015 | September 15, 2015 | 1 | |
| Late Night Joy | November 4, 2015 | November 29, 2015 | 1 | |
| Leah Remini: It's All Relative | July 10, 2014 | September 2, 2015 | 2 | |
| Little Chocolatiers | January 31, 2010 | August 6, 2010 | 1 | |
| The Little Couple | May 26, 2009 | September 24, 2019 | 14 | |
| Little People, Big World | March 4, 2006 | April 30, 2024 | 25 | |
| Little People Big World: Wedding Farm | November 13, 2012 | December 18, 2012 | 1 | |
| Livin' for the Apocalypse | August 28, 2011 | | 1 | |
| Long Island Medium | September 25, 2011 | December 13, 2019 | 14 | |
| Long Lost Family | March 6, 2016 | December 13, 2019 | 6 | |
| Loren and Alexei: After the 90 Days | January 10, 2022 | February 20, 2023 | 2 | |
| Lost in Transition | May 20, 2018 | July 8, 2018 | 1 | |
| Love & Translation | January 21, 2024 | April 21, 2024 | 1 | |
| Lottery Changed My Life | April 21, 2009 | November 14, 2011 | 4 | |
| Love, Lust or Run | January 23, 2015 | March 25, 2016 | 3 | |
| Mall Cops: Mall of America | May 27, 2010 | July 8, 2010 | 1 | |
| Married By Mom and Dad | December 13, 2015 | February 5, 2017 | 2 | |
| Match Me Abroad | May 14, 2023 | September 21, 2025 | 2 | |
| Meet the Putmans | January 16, 2017 | October 16, 2017 | 1 | |
| Miami Ink | July 19, 2005 | August 21, 2008 | 6 | |
| MILF Manor | January 15, 2023 | July 14, 2024 | 2 | |
| Moving Up | January 29, 2005 | October 17, 2009 | 4 | |
| My 600-lb Life | February 1, 2012 | February 12, 2025 | 13 | |
| My Big Fat American Gypsy Wedding | April 29, 2012 | September 4, 2016 | 5 | |
| My Feet Are Killing Me | January 2, 2020 | July 6, 2022 | 4 | |
| My Feet Are Killing Me: First Steps | September 10, 2020 | November 12, 2020 | 1 | |
| My First Home | April 21, 2007 | June 7, 2014 | 6 | |
| My Five Wives | September 26, 2013 | February 4, 2014 | 2 | |
| My Giant Life | July 14, 2015 | November 5, 2017 | 3 | |
| My Strange Addiction: Still Addicted | July 19, 2023 | August 23, 2023 | 1 | |
| Nate & Jeremiah by Design | April 8, 2017 | June 8, 2019 | 3 | |
| Next Great Baker | December 6, 2010 | August 19, 2014 | 4 | |
| NY Ink | June 2, 2011 | May 2, 2013 | 2 | |
| On the Fly | May 24, 2012 | July 12, 2012 | 1 | |
| One Big Happy Family | December 29, 2009 | August 3, 2010 | 2 | |
| The Opener | January 3, 2011 | January 10, 2011 | 1 | |
| Our Little Family | February 17, 2015 | October 27, 2015 | 2 | |
| Our Little Life | March 1, 2010 | March 8, 2010 | 1 | |
| Our Wild Life | May 22, 2018 | June 26, 2018 | 1 | |
| OutDaughtered | May 10, 2016 | July 2, 2024 | 10 | |
| Outrageous 911 | December 14, 2013 | November 5, 2014 | 1 | |
| Outrageous Kid Parties | February 21, 2011 | September 7, 2011 | 2 | |
| Overhaulin' | April 13, 2004 | June 26, 2008 | 5 | |
| Paleoworld | September 28, 1994 | 1997 | 4 | |
| Paranormal Lockdown | December 16, 2016 | March 3, 2017 | 1 | |
| Pete Rose: Hits & Mrs. | January 13, 2013 | February 17, 2013 | 1 | |
| Police Women of Broward County | October 3, 2009 | February 26, 2011 | 2 | |
| Police Women of Cincinnati | January 13, 2011 | March 3, 2011 | 1 | |
| Police Women of Dallas | October 28, 2010 | January 13, 2011 | 1 | |
| Police Women of Maricopa County | September 28, 2010 | May 5, 2010 | 1 | |
| Police Women of Memphis | May 27, 2010 | August 5, 2010 | 1 | |
| Polyfamily | April 29, 2025 | May 27, 2025 | 1 | |
| Property Ladder | June 14, 2005 | October 20, 2007 | 3 | |
| Quints by Surprise | August 30, 2010 | November 15, 2011 | 3 | |
| Randy to the Rescue | June 15, 2012 | August 2, 2013 | 2 | |
| Return to Amish | June 1, 2014 | May 16, 2023 | 7 | |
| Robotica | April 4, 2001 | November 16, 2002 | 3 | |
| Sarah Palin's Alaska | November 14, 2010 | January 9, 2011 | 1 | |
| Say Yes to the Dress | October 12, 2007 | May 17, 2025 | 23 | |
| Say Yes to The Dress: America | January 4, 2020 | March 14, 2020 | 1 | |
| Say Yes to the Dress: Atlanta | July 30, 2010 | April 25, 2020 | 11 | |
| Say Yes to the Dress: Big Bliss | October 1, 2010 | December 30, 2011 | 2 | |
| Say Yes to the Dress: Bridesmaids | July 8, 2011 | August 2, 2013 | 4 | |
| Say Yes to The Dress: England | January 4, 2020 | September 19, 2021 | 2 | |
| Say Yes to the Dress: Northern Edition | April 15, 2017 | April 29, 2017 | 1 | |
| Say Yes to the Dress: Randy Knows Best | April 1, 2011 | January 5, 2013 | 2 | |
| Say Yes to the Dress: The Big Day | December 20, 2012 | August 8, 2014 | 6 | |
| Say Yes to the Dress: UK | March 4, 2017 | August 22, 2022 | 4 | |
| Secret Princes | September 21, 2012 | December 8, 2013 | 2 | |
| Seeking Brother Husband | March 26, 2023 | April 30, 2023 | 1 | |
| Sex Sent Me to the ER | December 18, 2013 | March 26, 2016 | 2 | |
| Sextuplets Take New York | September 14, 2010 | October 5, 2010 | 1 | |
| Shalom in the Home | April 10, 2006 | May 7, 2007 | 2 | |
| Sin City Rules | December 9, 2012 | January 1, 2013 | 1 | |
| The Sisterhood | January 1, 2013 | February 12, 2013 | 1 | |
| sMothered | June 9, 2019 | February 13, 2024 | 5 | |
| So Freakin Cheap | June 28, 2021 | August 2, 2022 | 1 | |
| Strange Sex | July 18, 2010 | May 22, 2011 | 2 | |
| Street Customs | October 11, 2007 | November 19, 2009 | 2 | |
| Stuck | February 16, 2022 | March 2, 2022 | 1 | |
| Something Borrowed, Something New | February 8, 2013 | December 4, 2014 | 3 | |
| Starter Wives Confidential | January 29, 2013 | February 20, 2013 | 1 | |
| Sweet Home Sextuplets | August 18, 2018 | October 27, 2020 | 3 | |
| Table for 12 | March 23, 2009 | July 6, 2010 | 2 | |
| Take Home Chef | May 15, 2006 | March 7, 2008 | 3 | |
| Take My Tumor | April 3, 2024 | May 8, 2024 | 1 | |
| This is Life Live | April 23, 2017 | May 16, 2018 | 2 | |
| Toddlers & Tiaras | January 27, 2009 | November 23, 2016 | 7 | |
| Too Close to Home | August 22, 2016 | February 22, 2017 | 2 | |
| Totally T-Boz | January 1, 2013 | January 22, 2013 | 1 | |
| Trading Spaces | October 13, 2000 | June 2, 2018 | 10 | |
| Trading Spaces: Family | July 6, 2003 | April 24, 2005 | 2 | |
| Trauma: Life in the E.R. | February 20, 1997 | November 25, 2002 | 5 | |
| Tuckerville | October 22, 2005 | May 27, 2006 | 2 | |
| Ultimate Cake Off | August 3, 2009 | April 26, 2010 | 2 | |
| Unpolished | November 17, 2019 | March 2, 2021 | 2 | |
| The Unpoppables | February 7, 2011 | February 21, 2011 | 1 | |
| Virgins | June 9, 2025 | July 14, 2025 | 1 | |
| A Wedding Story | June 14, 1996 | 2004 | N/A | |
| Welcome to Myrtle Manor | March 3, 2013 | April 23, 2015 | 3 | |
| What Not to Wear | January 18, 2003 | October 18, 2013 | 10 | |
| When Dinosaurs Ruled | August 23, 1999 | August 25, 1999 | 1 | |
| When Skin Goes Wrong | November 19, 2020 | December 3, 2020 | 1 | |
| While You Were Out | July 6, 2002 | August 5, 2006 | 4 | |
| Who Do You Think You Are? | July 23, 2013 | December 17, 2018 | 10 | |
| The Willis Family | May 5, 2015 | April 19, 2016 | 2 | |
| You, Me & My Ex | June 20, 2021 | July 3, 2023 | 2 | |

=== Acquired programming ===
| Title | First aired | Last aired | Final season | References |
|---|---|---|---|---|
| American Chopper | January 17, 2008 | February 11, 2010 | 6 | |

- Amazing Space
- Bling It On
- Beakman's World (1992–1995)
- The Boy With a Tumor for a Face
- Breaking the Faith
- Brides of Beverly Hills
- Bringing Home Baby
- The Busey Bunch
- Biba's Italian Kitchen
- Bob Vila's Home Again
- Cash Cab
- Carlo Cooks Italian
- Caprial's Cafe
- Cover Shot
- Dancing Tweens
- Death by Chocolate
- The Day the Universe Changed
- Escaping the Prophet
- Everyday Exotic
- Extreme Machines
- Fabulous Cakes
- Furniture on the Mend
- Furniture to Go
- Fast Food Babies
- Firefight: Stories From The Frontlines
- Former Smokers
- Four Weddings
- Great Castles of Europe
- Hands on Crafts
- Home Made Simple
- Home Savvy
- The Home Pro
- Honey, We're Killing the Kids
- I am the Elephant Man
- I Eat 33,000 Calories a Day
- Kennedy Home Movies
- The Lottery Changed My Life
- Making Over America
- Man Versus Food
- Master of Dance
- Middle Eastern Café
- Million Dollar Agents
- Miss America Pageant
- My Crazy Obsession
- My Unique Family
- Mysteries of the ER
- The Operation
- Outrageous Kid Parties
- Plain Jane
- Psychic Witness
- Rags to Red Carpet
- The Renovation Guide
- She Does Not Feel Pain
- Shopaholic Showdown
- Surprise Homecoming
- Surviving Motherhood
- Ted Haggard: Scandalous
- Trading Spouses
- The Ultimate Guide
- Undercover Boss
- Traveling Family Features: The Adrids
- War and Civilization
- Wedding Dress Wars
- Weird Worlds
- What the Sell?
- Wild Weddings

== Children's programming ==
Between December 28, 1992, and September 26, 2008, TLC ran a children's programming block, Ready Set Learn!. Between February 24, 2003, and October 8, 2010, Ready Set Learn received a major rebrand hosted by Paz the Penguin. The Ready Set Learn branding was also used for Discovery Kids' preschool programming. As leadup to the relaunch of Discovery Kids as the Hub Network on October 10, 2010 (which would in turn be rebranded as the Discovery Family Channel on October 13, 2014), Family Game Night, one of the new programs featured on the relaunched network, was aired on October 10, 2010.

- Animal Jam (2003–04)
- Balamory (2005–06)
- The Berenstain Bears (1998–99)
- The Big Garage (1997–2001)
- Bindi the Jungle Girl (2008)
- Bingo & Molly (1997–2002)
- Bookmice (1992–96)
- Brum (2003–04)
- Chicken Minute (1995–97)
- Hi-5 (2003–08)
- Hip Hop Harry (2006–08)
- Iris, The Happy Professor (1992–97)
- Jay Jay the Jet Plane (1998–2000)
- Join In! (1992–95)
- Kitty Cats (1992–97)
- Little Star (1995–97)
- Madison's Adventures: Growing Up Wild (1996–98)
- The Magic Box (1992–96)
- The Magic School Bus (2003–08)
- Meteor and the Mighty Monster Trucks (2006–08)
- Ni Ni's Treehouse (2000–03)
- Pappyland (1996–2003)
- The Paz Show (2003–08)
- Peep and the Big Wide World (2004–08)
- Ready Set Learn Short Stuff (1992–2003)
- Rory and Me (1994–97)
- Rory's Place (1996–2000)
- Salty's Lighthouse (1998–2002)
- The Save-Ums! (2003–06)
- Skinnamarink TV (1997–2003)
- The Swamp Critters of Lost Lagoon (1997–98)
- Timothy Goes to School (2004–06)
- ToddWorld (2004–07)
- Wilbur (2007–08)
- Wisdom of the Gnomes (1996–98)
- The World of David the Gnome (1996–1998)
- Zoobilee Zoo (1992–1995)
