= List of programs broadcast by Oprah Winfrey Network =

This is a list of television programs formerly and currently broadcast by the Oprah Winfrey Network.

== Original programming ==
=== Reality ===
Title	Genre	Premiere	Seasons	Length	Status
Ready to Love	Dating show	October 23, 2018	12 seasons, 165 episodes	42 min	Season 12 ongoing
Love & Marriage: Huntsville	Reality	January 12, 2019	12 seasons, 205 episodes	42 min	Season 12 ongoing
Family or Fiancé	Reality	March 9, 2019	4 seasons, 65 episodes	42 min	Pending
Belle Collective	Reality	January 15, 2021	8 seasons, 78 episodes	42 min	Pending
The Never Ever Mets	Dating show	April 19, 2024	2 seasons, 21 episodes	42 min	Pending
#Somebody's Son	Dating show	April 12, 2025	1 season, 12 episodes	42 min	Pending
Heart & Hustle: Houston	Reality	August 2, 2025	2 seasons, 19 episodes	42 min	Pending
Maxxed Out	Reality	January 10, 2026	1 season, 8 episodes	42 min	Pending
Belle Collective: Birmingham	Reality	April 10, 2026	1 season, 8 episodes	42 min	Pending
Put a Ring on It: Cheathab	Reality	July 31, 2026	1 season, 9 episodes	42 min	Renewed for seasons 2–3

== Acquired programming ==
=== Syndicated ===
- 227
- America's Funniest Home Videos
- Benson
- Insecure

=== News magazine ===
- 20/20 on OWN
- Dateline on OWN

=== Reality ===
- Hot Bench
- Judge Judy
- Mathis Court with Judge Mathis

== Former programming ==
=== Drama ===
- Greenleaf (2016–20)
- Queen Sugar (2016–22)
- Love Is (2018)
- Ambitions (2019)
- David Makes Man (2019–21)
- Cherish the Day (2020–22)
- Delilah (2021)
- All Rise (season 3) (2022–23)

=== Comedy ===
- For Better or Worse (Season 3–6) (2013–17)
- Love Thy Neighbor (2013–17)
- The Paynes (2018)

=== Talk shows ===
- Dr. Phil
- The Dr. Oz Show
- The Ellen DeGeneres Show
- The Nate Berkus Show
- Rachael Ray
- Tamron Hall

=== Soap operas ===
- The Haves and the Have Nots (2013–21)
- If Loving You Is Wrong (2014–20)
- The Kings of Napa (2022)

=== Unscripted ===
- 2 Fat 2 Fly
- 6 Little McGhees
- 10 Kids 2 Dads
- Addicted to Food
- All the Single Ladies
- The Ambush Cook
- America's Money Class with Suze Orman
- Are You Normal, America?
- Ask Oprah's All Stars
- Behind Every Man
- Belief
- Beverly's Full House
- Beyond Belief
- The Big Holiday Food Fight
- Black Love
- Black Women OWN the Conversation
- Blackboard Wars
- The Book of John Gray
- Breakthrough with Tony Robbins
- Carson Nation
- Checked Inn
- Commander in Heels
- Couples Court with the Cutlers
- The Customer Is Always Right?
- Deion's Family Playbook
- Deliver Me
- The Diamond Collar
- The Doc Club with Rosie O'Donnell
- The Dr. Laura Berman Show
- Don't Tell the Bride
- Extreme Clutter with Peter Walsh
- Extreme Weight Loss
- Family Empire: Houston
- Fear Not with Iyanla Vanzant
- Finding Sarah: From Royalty to the Real World
- First-Time Buyer's Club
- Flex & Shanice
- Food Fantasies
- For Peete's Sake
- The Gayle King Show
- Girlfriends Check In
- Golden Sisters
- The Great Soul Food Cook-Off (Note: Originally premiered on Discovery+)
- The Hair Tales
- Help Desk
- Home Made Simple
- Home Takeover with Simon & Tomas
- Houston Beauty
- In the Bedroom with Dr. Laura Berman
- In Deep Shift with Jonas Elrod
- It's Not You, It's Men
- Iyanla: Fix My Life
- The Judds
- Judge Mathis
- Kidnapped by the Kids
- Knight Life with Gladys
- Ladies Who List: Atlanta
- Life with La Toya
- Lindsay
- Lives on Fire
- Livin' Lozada
- Lost and Found
- Love & Marriage: D.C.
- Love & Marriage: Detroit
- Love in the City
- Love Goals
- Lovely Bites
- Lovetown, USA
- Married to the Army: Alaska
- Marry Me Now
- Mind Your Business with Mahisha
- Miracle Detectives
- Mom's Got Game
- My Life Is a Joke
- Mystery Diagnosis
- The Nightcap with Carlos King
- Operation Change
- Oprah Builds a Network
- Oprah Prime
- Oprah: Where are They Now?
- Oprah's Favorite Things
- Oprah's Lifeclass
- Oprah's Master Class
- Our America with Lisa Ling
- OWN Documentary Club
- Party at Tiffany's
- Police Women of Broward County
- Police Women of Cincinnati
- Police Women of Dallas
- Police Women of Maricopa County
- Police Women of Memphis
- Put a Ring on It
- Raising Whitley
- Ready to Love: Make a Move
- Real Life: The Musical
- Rebuilding Black Wall Street
- Released
- The Rob Bell Show
- Rollin' With Zach
- The Rosie Show (2011–12)
- Ryan and Tatum: The O'Neals
- Searching For...
- Season 25: Oprah Behind the Scenes
- Shocking Family Secrets
- Staten Island Law
- Super Saver Showdown
- Super Soul Sessions
- Super Soul Sunday
- Swell Life
- T.D. Jakes
- Tanya's Kitchen Table
- Time of Essence
- To Have & to Hold: Charlotte
- Tregaye's Way
- Trouble Next Door
- TV Guide Magazine's Top 25 Best Oprah Show Moments
- The Tyler Perry Show
- Undercover Boss
- Unfaithful: Stories of Betrayal
- Unlocked: Family Secrets
- Visionaries: Inside the Creative Mind
- Wanda Sykes Presents Herlarious
- Welcome to Sweetie Pie's
- Why Not? with Shania Twain
- Your OWN Show: Oprah's Search for the Next TV Star
