= Joy Behar: Say Anything! =

- Genre: Talk show
- Presented by: Joy Behar
- Country of origin: United States
- Original language: English
- No. of seasons: 1
- No. of episodes: 156

Production
- Production locations: Time Warner Center; New York City (2009–11)
- Camera setup: Multi-camera
- Running time: 60 minutes

Original release
- Network: HLN
- Release: September 29, 2009 – December 16, 2011
- Network: Current TV
- Release: September 4, 2012 – August 1, 2013

Joy Behar: Say Anything! is an American news program and talk show hosted by Joy Behar. The program had its "Preview" while Behar filled in as a week-long host on Viewpoint with Eliot Spitzer on June 18, 2012, and officially premiered on Current TV on September 4, 2012. The final episode of the Current TV program aired on August 1, 2013, as the network prepared to transition to Al Jazeera America.

== HLN version (2009–11) ==
The Joy Behar Show was a news program and talk show that premiered on HLN on Tuesday, September 29, 2009 and ran until December 16, 2011. The show was hosted by Joy Behar, who is one of the five co-hosts of The View.

The show originally aired in the 9PM eastern slot/8PM central with encore presentations at 12AM and 5AM eastern, but was moved to 10PM eastern in January 2011 with encore presentations at 3AM eastern. The show aired new episodes Monday through Friday, while the shows on Saturday and Sunday were reruns.

The show's format was generally an interview/discussion setting where Joy Behar and her panel of guests discussed current events in pop culture, politics, and general media happenings. Guests were also often interviewed one on one, or by satellite feed, where questions are more geared toward that particular guest's life and views.

The show was cancelled on November 17, 2011 and Joy Behar stated that she appreciated all of the people who helped put the show together. The final episode aired on Friday, December 16, 2011.

=== HLN guests ===
Some guests who appeared on the HLN show include: Kate Gosselin, Jeff Ross, Joan Rivers, Kathy Griffin, Bette Midler, Christopher Hitchens, Ann Coulter, Michael Moore, Jeanine Pirro, Sarah Silverman, Bill Murray, Jane Curtin, Gilbert Gottfried, Betty White, Roseanne Barr, Dolly Parton, Linda Evangelista, The Go-Go's, Wendie Malick, Rita Moreno, Victor Garber, Gloria Estefan, Rosie O'Donnell, Steve Martin, Perez Hilton, Linda Gray, Susie Essman, Carrie Fisher, Arianna Huffington, Martin Short and Valerie Bertinelli. Her View Co-hosts Whoopi Goldberg, Sherri Shepherd, Elisabeth Hasselbeck, and former co-Host Star Jones, also appeared.

=== HLN ratings ===
During its HLN run, The Joy Behar Show was not successful in comparison to other cable news shows of its format. A ratings snapshot taken February 11, 2010 revealed Behar as the fourth highest rated show in its timeslot, well over two million viewers behind Sean Hannity.

== Move to Current TV (2012–13) ==
On June 11, 2012, Behar signed a deal with Current TV to do a similar show, now shortened to just Joy Behar, but with a more political slant. Although the series debuted in September 2012, she unveiled her new series logo during her fill-in as host for Viewpoint with Eliot Spitzer on June 18, 2012.

On July 31, 2012, Current TV announced that the program would debut on September 4, 2012 and would be titled Joy Behar: Say Anything!.

Joy Behar: Say Anything! premiered on Current TV on Tuesday September 4, 2012 at 6:00e/3:00p with guests Darrell Hammond, Al Gore, Judy Gold and Rob Shuter. The show aired from Monday to Thursday at 9:00/8:00c.

=== Episodes ===
No.	Original release date	Guest(s)
1	September 4, 2012	Darrell Hammond, Al Gore
Plus, Judy Gold and Rob Shuter.
2	September 5, 2012	Lewis Black and Carrie Fisher
Plus the latest on the Democratic Convention with Governor Jennifer Granholm and political columnist Sophia Nelson.
3	September 6, 2012	Melissa Etheridge
Plus, Jennifer Psaki, Michael Maslansky, Marc Lamont Hill and Alan Colmes.
4	September 10, 2012	Dee and Suzette Snider
Plus, Joe Levy, Jessica Kirson and Jennifer Granholm.
5	September 11, 2012	Colin Quinn
Plus, Shmuley Boteach, Edward Beck, Anthea Butler, Boris Epshteyn and China Okasi.
6	September 12, 2012	Jesse Ventura, Susie Essman, Logan Levkoff and Tony Danza
7	September 13, 2012	Melissa Leo
Plus, Lenny McAllister, Robert Zimmerman and Hanna Rosin.
8	September 24, 2012	Musician and activist Wyclef Jean & Justin Bieber’s mother, Pattie Mallette
Plus, Joy’s interview with Susan Sarandon and Cyndi Lauper.
9	September 25, 2012	Lloyd Grove, Sue Simmons and Suzanne Somers
10	September 26, 2012	Tim Conway, Vicki Lawrence, Gloria Steinem, Shelby Knox, Howard Bragman and Nancy Giles
11	September 27, 2012	Mario Cantone, Carole King, Richard Belzer and Stephen Baldwin
12	October 1, 2012	Frank Rich, Andy Cohen, Ian Kerner and Cindy Gallop
13	October 2, 2012	Ann Coulter, Kevin Powell, Jenny McCarthy and Stacy London
14	October 3, 2012	Gotham and Deepak Chopra
Guest host John Fugelsang. Plus, Rick Ungar, Cheri Jacobus, Baratunde Thurston and Hal Sparks.
15	October 4, 2012	Alfre Woodard
Plus, Kellyanne Conway, Robert Zimmerman, John Fugelsang, Rob Shuter, Rachel Sklar and Victoria Jackson.
16	October 8, 2012	Tyne Daly
Plus, Bill Press, Armstrong Williams, and David Rothenberg.
17	October 9, 2012	Anna Greenberg, Eliot Spitzer, Rick Tyler, Linda Fairstein, John Walsh, Gilbert Gottfried and Robert Klein
18	October 10, 2012	Crystal Wright, Penny Lee, Paul Carrick Brunson, Kailen Rosenberg and Rain Pryor
19	October 15, 2012	Regis Philbin, Camille Paglia and Atlanta Mayor Kasim Reed
20	October 16, 2012	Lorraine Bracco, Kathleen Turner, Christine Todd Whitman and Jennifer Granholm
21	October 17, 2012	Stephanie Cutter, Valerie Bertinelli, Robert Zimmerman, David Fredosso, Jennifer Granholm and D.L. Hughley
22	October 18, 2012	Sophia Nelson, Sam Seder, Nate Berkus and Dr. Ruth Westheimer
23	October 22, 2012	Jamal Simmons, Sabrina Schaeffer, Bob Saget and Yvette Nicole Brown
24	October 23, 2012	Barbara Boxer, Sam Seder, Crystal Wright, Kathy Najimy and Penny Marshall
25	October 24, 2012	Michael Steele, Mark Levine, Mo Rocca, Parker Posey and Aasif Mandvi
26	October 25, 2012	Ford O’Connell, Farai Chideya, Rob Shuter, Sarah Bernard, Lisa Lillien and Rosie Perez
27	November 1, 2012	Robert Zimmerman, Michael Maslansky, Nancy Giles, Amy Heckerling, Tamar Braxton and Vince Herbert
28	November 5, 2012	Richard Belzer, Wayne Allyn Root, Robert Zimmerman, China Okasi and Boris Epshteyn
29	November 6, 2012	Comedians Tommy Davidson, Judy Gold, Chuck Nice, Lizz Winstead and Jeffrey Ross
30	November 7, 2012	Bill Richardson, Alan Grayson, Dan Savage, Nancy Giles, Armstrong Williams, Erica Payne and Wayne Allyn Root
31	November 8, 2012	Ty Pennington, Rabbi Shmuley Boteach, Father Edward Beck, Anthea Butler
Also, a pop culture roundtable with Noah Levy, Keith Powell and Jessica Shaw
32	November 12, 2012	Howard Bragman, Sal Strazzullo, Darrell Hammond, Craig Bierko, Joe Levy and Rachel Sklar
33	November 13, 2012	Jane Pauley, Michael Symon and biographer Kitty Kelley
34	November 14, 2012	Whoopi Goldberg and Nick Cannon
Plus, Frank Bruni, Jack Cloonan, and Bethany Marshall on the Petraeus scandal.
35	November 15, 2012	Mike Daly, Julian Epstein, Oliver Stone, Peter Kuznick, Rob Shuter, Arden Myrin and Jennifer Hutt
36	November 19, 2012	Meredith Vieira and Frank Rich
Plus, a look at today's pop culture stories with Sarah Bernard and comedians Jim Florentine and Nikki Glaser
37	November 20, 2012	Liza Minnelli, David Steinberg and Susie Essman
38	November 21, 2012	Chef Michael Symon, Iyanla Vanzant and Rico Rodriguez
39	November 26, 2012	Salman Rushdie
Plus, a look at today’s top pop culture stories with W. Kamau Bell, Chuck Nice and Sara Gore
40	November 27, 2012	Actress Debi Mazar and Gabriele Corcos
Plus, part two of Joy’s interview with author Salman Rushdie.
41	November 28, 2012	Fran Drescher and Tichina Arnold
Plus, Chaim Levin, who is suing a Jewish gay conversion therapy group that promised to make him straight.
42	November 29, 2012	Annie Potts and Janet Hubert
Plus, comedian Rich Vos and celebrity journalist Bonnie Fuller.
43	December 3, 2012	Carson Kressley and Meliss Francis
Plus, a look at today’s top pop culture stories with Sherrod Small, Ben Aaron and Galina Espinoza.
44	December 4, 2012	Lenny McAllister, Chris Hahn, and Katie Roiphe
Plus, Holy Rollers with Father Edward Beck, Rabbi David Ingber and Rev. Susan Sparks.
45	December 5, 2012	Tony Goldwyn and Dr. Ruth Westheimer
Plus, a look at today’s top pop culture stories with Famestream Media panelists John Fugelsang, Jeremy Kyle and Kim Coles.
46	December 6, 2012	Cheri Oteri
Plus, political hot topics with Sam Seder and Ron Christie. And, Gary Gulman, Jacque Reid and Noah Levy join our Famestream Media panel.
47	December 11, 2012	Mandy Patinkin and Susannah Cahalan
Plus, Hanna Rosin, Siggy Flicker and Matt Titus.
48	December 12, 2012	Margaret Carlson, Michael Maslansky, and T.I.
Plus, Rachel Sklar, Tom Cotter and Jay Thomas.
49	December 13, 2012	Jeremy Irons, Kevin Nealon and A Christmas Story star Peter Billingsley
Plus, Sherri Shepherd talks with Joy Behar “Comics with Benefits”.
50	December 17, 2012	Sandy Hook Discussion with Dr. Marisa Randazzo, Dr. Brian Russell, Dr. Alicia Salzer and Dr. Adam Brown
Plus, David Sirota and Steven Dulan debate gun control. And Holy Rollers panelists Father Edward Beck, Professor Anthea Butler and Rabbi David Ingber consider how God could have let the event happen
51	December 18, 2012	Marc Lamont Hill and Jon Meacham On Gun Control
Plus, Dr. Michael Welner and Dr. Robin Smith discuss the mind of a killer. Famestream Media panelists Howard Bragman, China Okasi and Judy Gold consider media coverage of the Sandy Hook Elementary School shooting.
52	December 19, 2012	The Top 10 Pop Culture Stories of 2012 with Rob Shuter, Chuck Nice, and Sarah Bernard
Plus, actress Renée Taylor.
53	December 20, 2012	Olivia Newton-John
Plus, comedian Gilbert Gottfried, porn icon Robin Byrd, Kevin Nealon and Jeremy Irons.
54	January 2, 2013	Forbes columnist Rick Ungar, Democratic strategist Zerlina Maxwell, GOP strategist Tom Doherty
Plus, filmmakers Kevin Mazur and Tricia Nolan, “Just Jenny” host Jenny Hutt, ABC News reporter Sheila Marikar and comedian Sherrod Small. Featuring guest host John Fugelsang.
55	January 3, 2013	Republican comedian Ellen Karis, TV personality Rene Syler, Huffington Post Executive Business Editor Peter Goodman
Plus, fitness instructor Kristen James, dietician Laura Cipullo, Domonique Scott and Christina Murray of TLC’s “Sisterhood,” and Anthea Butler, Religious Studies professor. Featuring guest host John Fugelsang.
56	January 7, 2013	Lisa Vanderpump, John Fugelsang, Nancy Giles, and Robert Zimmerman
Plus, Dr. Ian Smith and Logan Levkoff.
57	January 8, 2013	Joy Goes to Hollywood: Betty White and the cast of Shahs of Sunset
58	January 9, 2013	Eben Alexander, Vinny Guadagnino, and S. Epatha Merkerson
59	January 10, 2013	JB Smoove, Marlon Wayans, Bill Spadea, and Sam Seder
60	January 14, 2013	Mob Wives stars Renee Graziano and Love Majewski
Plus, Republican strategist Boris Epshteyn and Democratic strategist Christopher Hahn join Joy to debate gun control. Famestream Media panelists Rob Shuter, Galina Espinoza and Chuck Nice dish on the Golden Globes.
61	January 15, 2013	Joy Goes to Hollywood: Carl Reiner and Mel Brooks
62	January 16, 2013	Jerry Springer, Kim Richards, and Mob Wives stars Karen Gravano, Ramona Rizzo, Drita D’Avanzo and Carla Facciolo
63	January 17, 2013	Barney Frank, Ian Drew, Judy Gold, and Marianne Garvey
Plus, controversial author Dara-Lynn Weiss talks about putting her 7-year-old daughter on a diet.
64	January 22, 2013	George Takei and Dr. Cheryl Cohen Green
Plus, Bill Spadea, Lizz Winstead, and Nancy Giles discuss the Inauguration.
65	January 23, 2013	Wade Davis and director Tom Hooper
Plus, Sarah Bernard, comedian Chuck Nice and “Naughty But Nice” columnist Rob Shuter.
66	January 24, 2013	Cyndi Lauper and Vanilla Ice
Plus, Linda Stasi, Jo Koy, Noah Levy and Bonnie Fuller.
67	January 28, 2013	Susie Essman
Plus, a look at today’s top pop culture stories with Judy Gold, Joe Levy and Jessica Shaw. And Joy sits down with Holy Rollers panelists Anthea Butler, Rabbi David Ingber and Bethany Blankley.
68	January 29, 2013	SNL Writer Alan Zweibel and Michele Sileo and Elura Nanos of OWN's Staten Island Law
Plus, Democratic strategist Chris Hahn, Republican strategist Ron Christie, and Dr. Steve Salvatore.
69	January 30, 2013	Erica and Tina Campbell of Mary Mary and Stephen Fakuna
Plus, Famestream Media panelists Russell Peters, Rachel Sklar and Ian Drew on the top pop culture stories of the day.
70	January 31, 2013	Mario Cantone and Jacob Rudolph
Plus, a look at the top pop culture stories with Chuck Nice, Howard Bragman and China Okasi.
71	February 4, 2013	Rev Run and Tyrese Gibson
Plus, Andrew Dice Clay, Rob Shuter, Galina Espinoza and Chuck Nice.
72	February 5, 2013	Cheryl Hines and Rachel Dratch
Plus, a political roundtable with Armstrong Williams and Robert Zimmerman.
73	February 6, 2013	Frank DeCaro and Heather McDonald
Plus, Dorothy Cascerceri, Bonnie McFarlane and Rich Vos.
74	February 7, 2013	Pia Zadora and Susie Essman
Plus, a political roundtable with Boris Epshteyn and Chris Hahn.
75	February 11, 2013	Anthea Butler
Plus, a look at today's pop culture stories with Judy Gold, Joe Levy and Nancy Giles. Also, a political roundtable with Democratic strategist Robert Zimmerman and Republican strategist Bill Spadea.
76	February 13, 2013	Carson Kressley, Brandi Glanville, and MTV’s Nikki Glaser and Sara Schaefer
Plus, a look back at last night’s State of the Union address with Chris Hahn and Ford O’Connell.
77	February 14, 2013	Gavin Newsom and Jackie Collins
Plus, the latest pop culture news with Rob Shuter, Sherrod Small and Rachel Sklar. Guest host Jerry Springer.
78	February 19, 2013	Suze Orman
Plus, the latest pop culture news with Rob Shuter, Galina Espinoza and Chuck Nice.
79	February 20, 2013	Billy Goldberg and Jaiya
Plus, a political roundtable with Armstrong Williams, Sam Seder, Rebecca Dana.
80	February 21, 2013	Sex experts Logan Levkoff and Debbie Magids
Plus, Jimmy Lee Hales and the latest pop culture news with Sherrod Small, Jacque Reid and Ian Drew. Guest host Nancy Giles.
81	February 25, 2013	Pastor Jay Bakker of Revolution Church NYC
Plus, Famestream Media panelists Rob Shuter, Judy Gold and Chuck Nice join “Say Anything!” host Joy Behar to weigh in on the Oscars.
82	February 26, 2013	Lewis Black and Dr. Robin Smith
Plus, model Emme and Melissa Francis.
83	February 27, 2013	Barbara Corcoran
Plus, a sex panel with Siggy Flicker, Mandy Stadtmiller and Garren James. And, author James Lasdun talks about being the target of a stalker.
84	February 28, 2013	Alex Karpovsky and Jennifer Rawlings
Plus, Holy Rollers panelists Father Edward Beck, Bethany Blankley and Rabbi David Ingber discuss Benedict XVI’s last day as pope, among other topics.
85	March 4, 2013	Jenny Lawson
Plus, Sam Seder and Bill Spadea discuss Mitt and Ann Romney’s first TV interview since the election. And, Chuck Nice, Rob Shuter and Galina Espinoza on the top pop culture stories of the day.
86	March 5, 2013	Dr. Ian K. Smith
Plus, Lauren Drain talks about her experience inside the Westboro Baptist Church.
87	March 6, 2013	Katherine LaNasa
Plus, Howard Bragman, Jacque Reid and Jim Florentine discuss the day's top pop culture stories with guest host Bobby Flay.
88	March 7, 2013	Frank Rich and Ashanti
Plus, actor and comedian Bobcat Goldthwait.
89	March 11, 2013	Lily Tomlin
Plus, “Walking Dead” actor IronE Singleton and a roundup of the top pop culture stories with Famestream Media panelists Rob Shuter, Judy Gold and Galina Espinoza.
90	March 12, 2013	The Cast of Braxton Family Values
Plus, Christa Parravani, author of the memoir, “Her.”
91	March 13, 2013	Toni Braxton
Plus, a political roundtable with Chris Hahn, China Okasi and Ron Christie. And, Famestream Media panelists Chuck Nice, Sarah Bernard, and Joe Levy with the top pop culture stories.
92	March 14, 2013	Sam Champion and Chely Wright
Guest host Howard Bragman. Plus, Famestream Media panelists Bonnie Fuller, Jacque Reid and Dena Blizzard.
93	March 18, 2013	Jon Secada and Karen Gravano of Mob Wives
Guest host Carson Kressley. Plus, a pop culture roundup with Sherrod Small, Noah Levy and Marianne Garvey.
94	March 19, 2013	Andrew McCarthy and comedian Josh Wolf
Guest host Stacy London. Plus, a pop culture roundup with Rachel Sklar, Sarah Bernard and Jessica Kirson.
95	March 20, 2013	Hardcore Pawn star Les Gold
Guest host Jerry Springer. Plus, a look at the day’s pop culture stories with Rob Shuter, Jenny Hutt and Arden Myrin.
96	March 21, 2013	Author Lucinda Bassett
Guest host Nancy Giles. Also, a discussion about adoption with Jane Aronson and Deborra-Lee Furness. And, a pop culture roundup with Ian Drew, Sara Gore and Don Jamieson.
97	March 25, 2013	Chris Hahn and Armstrong Williams
Guest host Montel Williams. Also, Donna Jackson Nakazawa, Keri Glassman, Dr. Robyn Smith and Lisa Sanders.
98	March 26, 2013	Director P.J. Hogan and Dr. Venus Nicolino from L.A. Shrinks
Guest host Chuck Nice. Plus, Paul Carrick Brunson and Siggy Flicker with advice on relationships.
99	March 27, 2013	Emileen Hanna and Michael Markiewicz
Guest host Judy Gold. The latest on DOMA with Laverne Cox, Noah Michelson and David Mixner. Plus, Jim Florentine, Jacque Reid and Dorothy Cascerceri.
100	April 1, 2013	Money Expert Jean Chatzky
Plus, politics with Boris Epshteyn, Robert Zimmerman and China Okasi. And, a pop culture roundtable with Rob Shuter, Chuck Nice and Galina Espinoza.
101	April 2, 2013	Patti Davis
Also, Real Housewives of Orange County’s Tamra Barney and Vicky Gunvalson. Plus, Michele Sileo and Elura Nanos of OWN's Staten Island Law chat with Joy.
102	April 3, 2013	Nia Vardalos and Michelle Rhee
Plus, the debate over “Lean In” with Lisa Miller, Bonnie Fuller and Lisa Belkin.
103	April 4, 2013	Dr. Daniel Amen and Jenni Pulos of Bravo’s Flipping Out
Plus, feminist pornographer Tristan Taormino.
104	April 8, 2013	Curtis Stone
Also, a discussion on the Holocaust with Steven Pressman and Liz Perle, the team behind HBO’s “50 Children: The Rescue Mission of Mr. and Mrs. Kraus.” Plus a look at today’s pop culture news with Famestream Media penelists Noah Levy, Trisha Goddard and Dena Blizzard.
105	April 9, 2013	Camille Paglia and Jane Fonda's Adopted Daughter, Mary Williams
Plus, Rachel Sklar, Nancy Giles and Joe Levy discuss the latest pop culture news.
106	April 10, 2013	Ophira Eisenberg
Plus, politics with Sam Seder and Boris Epshteyn. Also, Rob Shuter, Judy Gold and Sarah Bernard with the latest in pop culture news.
107	April 11, 2013	Lynn Whitfield and Gretchen Rubin
Plus, politics with Bill Spadea and David Sirota.
108	April 16, 2013	Paul Anka
Former FBI agent Jack Cloonan, Dr. Janet Taylor and Yahoo News’ Beth Fouhy discuss the aftermath of the bombings at the Boston Marathon. Plus, a Famestream Media panel with Rob Shuter, Judy Gold and Sarah Bernard.
109	April 17, 2013	Brad Garrett and Richard Belzer
110	April 18, 2013	Dr. Daniel and Tana Amen
Also, Dr. Abraham Morgentaler, Tristan Taormino and Chuck Nice.
111	April 22, 2013	Tom Sizemore
Plus, the latest on the Boston bombers with criminologist Dr. Casey Jordan, Boston Globe columnist Farah Stockman and former NYPD investigator Nicholas Casale.
112	April 23, 2013	Anna Quindlen and Seinfeld writer Peter Mehlman
Plus, part two of Joy's interview with Brad Garrett.
113	April 24, 2013	Brian Stelter
Plus, a Famestream Media panel with Noah Levy, Jessica Shaw and Jessica Kirson. And, sex advice from Chuck Nice, Tristan Taormino and Natalie Clarice.
114	April 25, 2013	Joe Pantoliano
Plus, writer Joan Walsh and May May Ali, daughter of Muhammad Ali.
115	April 29, 2013	Charles Graeber and Amy Ridgway
Plus, sex advice with Ian Kerner and Emily Morse. And, politics with John Fugelsang and Boris Epshteyn.
116	April 30, 2013	Charlie Ebersol
Plus, a pop culture roundup with Rob Shuter, Chuck Nice and Rich Vos.
117	May 1, 2013	Eve Ensler
Plus, actress Sally Kellerman and Dr. Michael Breus, aka “The Sleep Doctor.”
118	May 2, 2013	Christina Crawford
Plus, sex and relationship expert Dr. Pepper Schwartz. And part two of Joy's interview with Joe Pantoliano.
119	May 6, 2013	Sherri Shepherd
Daisy Khan, executive director of the American Society for Muslim Advancement, discusses the aftermath of the Boston Marathon bombings. Plus, Erica Payne and Armstrong Williams talk politics.
120	May 7, 2013	Marilu Henner
Plus, the stars of Bravo’s “Million Dollar Listing New York.” And Famestream Media panelists Judy Gold, Sarah Bernard and Jacque Reid.
121	May 8, 2013	Jennifer Finney Boylan and Art Smith
Plus, Famestream Media panelists Rob Shuter, Chuck Nice and Galina Espinoza.
122	May 9, 2013	David Alan Grier, Isabella Rossellini, and Niecy Nash
123	May 13, 2013	Elisabeth Rohm
Plus, Dr. Richard Besser. And, the cast of Bravo’s “Newlyweds: The First Year.”
124	May 14, 2013	Augusten Burroughs and Jenna Ushkowitz
Plus, a look at pop culture news with Jessica Kirson, Howard Bragman and Jenny Hutt.
125	May 15, 2013	Alison Sweeney and Tabatha Coffey
Plus, politics with Boris Epshteyn and Robert Zimmerman.
126	May 16, 2013	Dee Snider, Suzette Snider and Colin Quinn
127	May 20, 2013	Judith Regan and Laura Antoniou
Politics with Crystal Wright, Sam Seder and Nancy Giles. And, Laurel Leff and Emily Harrold on the New York Times’ shoddy Holocaust reporting.
128	May 21, 2013	James Van Praagh
Plus, Jo Wood, ex-wife of Rolling Stones’ rocker Ronnie Wood. Plus Famestream Media panelists Joe Levy, Judy Gold and Jacque Reid.
129	May 22, 2013	Jo Frost
Plus, chef Marcus Samuelsson. And, pop culture news with Rob Shuter, Chuck Nice and Galina Espinoza.
130	May 23, 2013	The cast of “Evocateur: The Morton Downey Jr. Movie”
Guest host Montel Williams. Plus, gold-medal bobsledder Steve Holcomb, Dr. Brian Boxer Wachler, Armstrong Williams and Chris Hahn.
131	June 3, 2013	Politics with Robert Zimmerman and Ron Christie
Plus, a Famestream Media panel with Rob Shuter, Chuck Nice and Galina Espinoza. And, screenwriter Geoffrey Fletcher.
132	June 4, 2013	“Push Girls” stars Tiphany Adams and Mia Schaikewitz
Plus, Dr. Steven Lamm and chef Roble Ali.
133	June 5, 2013	Former Governor Jesse Ventura
Plus, “Real Housewife of New Jersey” Caroline Manzo and Dr. Elie Levine.
134	June 6, 2013	Joe Muto and “Golden Sisters” stars Mary Bartnicki, Teresa Dahlquist and Josie Cavaluzzi
Plus, the latest on pop culture with Famestream Media panelists Rich Vos, Noah Levy and Sarah Bernard.
135	June 10, 2013	Dr. Ruth Westheimer
Plus, a special "Holy Rollers" panel with Anthea Butler, Rabbi David Ingber, and Father Dave Dwyer.
136	June 11, 2013	Comedian Alec Mapa
Plus, “Sopranos” star Steve Schirripa. And, pop culture news with Rachel Sklar, Jessica Kirson and Jacque Reid.
137	June 12, 2013	TBA
138	June 13, 2013	TBA
139	June 14, 2013	TBA
140	June 17, 2013	Dr. Gail Saltz, Marcia Clark, Howard Bragman, and Kjerstin Gruys
Guest host Nancy Giles. Plus, a Famestream Media panel with Nikki Glaser, Sarah Bernard and Joe Levy.
141	June 18, 2013	TBA
142	June 19, 2013	TBA
143	June 20, 2013	TBA
144	June 24, 2013	TBA
145	June 25, 2013	TBA
146	July 8, 2013	Randy Cohen
Plus, Famestream guests Sarah Bernard, Baruch Shemtov and Kevin Meaney. And, Robert Zimmerman and Ron Christie.
147	July 9, 2013	Lauren Sandler and 'Manhattan Madam' Kristin Davis
Plus, Famestream guests Dr. Gail Saltz, Rachel Sklar and Nancy Giles.
148	July 10, 2013	Dr. Michael Breus
Plus, Famestream guests Galina Espinoza, Chuck Nice, and Rob Shuter.
149	July 11, 2013	Susie Essman and Lizz Winstead
Plus, Augusten Burrows.
150	July 15, 2013	Neil Sedaka
Plus, political panel guests Rich Benjamin, Ron Christie and Chris Hahn discuss the George Zimmerman trial. And, Famestream guests Rob Shuter, Rachel Sklar and Chuck Nice.
151	July 17, 2013	Curtis Stone
Guest host Chuck Nice. Plus, relationship panelists Amy Laurent, Joe Levy and Tristan Taormino.
152	July 18, 2013	Tony Danza
Guest host Marilu Henner. Plus, Fashion Designer Michael Costello and Dr. Neal Barnard.
153	July 29, 2013	NYC Mayoral Candidate Christine Quinn and Howie Mandel
154	July 30, 2013	Julia Sweeney
Guest co-host Susie Essman.
155	July 31, 2013	Frank Rich
Plus, panelists Nancy Giles, Dr. Gail Saltz and Rachel Sklar. And, Anthea Butler, Rabbi David Ingber and Father James Martin.
156	August 1, 2013	Rob Shuter
Interview with Shuter and final panel talk. planned Ending by Behar with a planned Al Jazeera logo appearing on screen and crew moving the table, chairs, and other items off set while Behar is saying goodbye.

== Awards and nominations ==
GLAAD Awards

- 2010 – Nomination for Best Talk Show Episode (LDS Church & Gays)
