= Salt Lake City in film =

The following is a list of films which are set in or around Salt Lake City, Utah. Note that Utah is a right-to-work state, and as such, has become a popular filming location, because actors and labor are not required to follow rules for the Screen Actors Guild. Salt Lake City provides a generic Western urban landscape, often playing the substitute for Los Angeles, Denver, or unnamed cities.

== Films set in Salt Lake City ==
- Airport 1975
- Brigham Young
- Forever Strong
- Mr. Krueger's Christmas
- Net Worth
- Plan 10 from Outer Space (a spoof based on Plan 9 from Outer Space)
- SLC Punk!
- The Crow: Salvation
- The Way of the Gun

== Films shot in Salt Lake City ==
- 127 Hours
- Airport 1975
- Brigham Young
- The Brown Bunny
- Carnival of Souls
- Con Air
- Dawn of the Dead
- Drive Me Crazy
- Dumb and Dumber
- Forever Strong
- Halloween sequels after Halloween III: Season of the Witch to Halloween: The Curse of Michael Myers
- High School Musical
- High School Musical 2
- High School Musical 3
- The House of Seven Corpses
- Independence Day
- Letters from a Killer
- A Life Less Ordinary
- Melvin and Howard
- Minutemen
- Mr. Krueger's Christmas
- My Girlfriend's Boyfriend
- The Philadelphia Experiment
- Pool Hall Junkies
- The Crow: Salvation
- Revenge of the Ninja
- The Sandlot
- Savannah Smiles
- SLC Punk!
- Three O'Clock High
- Unaccompanied Minors
- Unhook the Stars
- The Way of the Gun
- The World's Fastest Indian
- Charley (based on the novel by Jack Weyland)

== Television shows shot in Salt Lake City ==
- The Amazing Race 8
- portions of Big Love
- portions of Everwood
- episodes of Flip Men
- Insomniac with Dave Attell Season 4
- The Jerk Theory
- Promised Land
- The TV miniseries of The Stand
- Touched by an Angel Almost entirely filmed on location throughout Salt Lake City and Utah.
- Breaking Pointe Reality TV show following Ballet West and highlighting downtown locations.
- portion of Top Gear America "Best Taxi Challenge" Season 3 episode 11, Drifting BMW M5
- Little Chocolatiers Entirely filmed in Salt Lake City.
- The Real Housewives of Salt Lake City
- Andi Mack
- Selling SLC
- High School Musical: The Musical: The Series Season 1 & 2
