= The customer is always right (disambiguation) =

The customer is always right is a popular slogan within the service industry.

It may also refer to:

- The Customer is Always Right, a Sin City yarn within The Babe Wore Red and Other Stories
  - "The Customer is Always Right", two segments of Sin City (film)
- The Customer is Always Right (film), a 2006 South Korean film
- The Customer is Always Right (TV series), a 2019 BBC TV series
- "The Customer is Always Right?", broadcast on the Oprah Winfrey Network
- "The Customer is Always Right", an episode of Rainbow
- "The Customer's Always Right", an episode of The Tortellis
- "Customer's Always Right", a song on the 2006 album Phatso by American rapper Jamie Madrox
- "The Customer’s Always Right", a song in the 1961 musical Sail Away by Noël Coward
- "The customer is always right", translation of the Japanese phrase "kyakusama wa kamisama desu", popularized by Haruo Minami

== See also ==
- Customer service
