= As Long as You Love Me =

As Long as You Love Me may refer to:

== Albums ==
- As Long as You Love Me, an album by Mickey Thomas, 1976
- As Long as You Love Me, an album by Japanese band Hal, 2002

== Songs ==
- "As Long as You Love Me" (Backstreet Boys song), 1997
- "As Long as You Love Me" (Caleb Johnson song), 2014
- "As Long as You Love Me" (Justin Bieber song), 2012
- "As Long As You Love Me", a song by David Whitfield, 1962
- "As Long As You Love Me", a song by The Impressions from The Impressions, 1961
- "As Long As You Love Me", a song by James Darren, 1971

== Other uses ==
- "As Long as You Love Me", an episode of Police Women of Memphis

== See also ==
- "I Don't Care" (Just as Long as You Love Me), a 1964 single by Buck Owens
