= Child beauty pageant =

Beauty contest featuring children as contestants

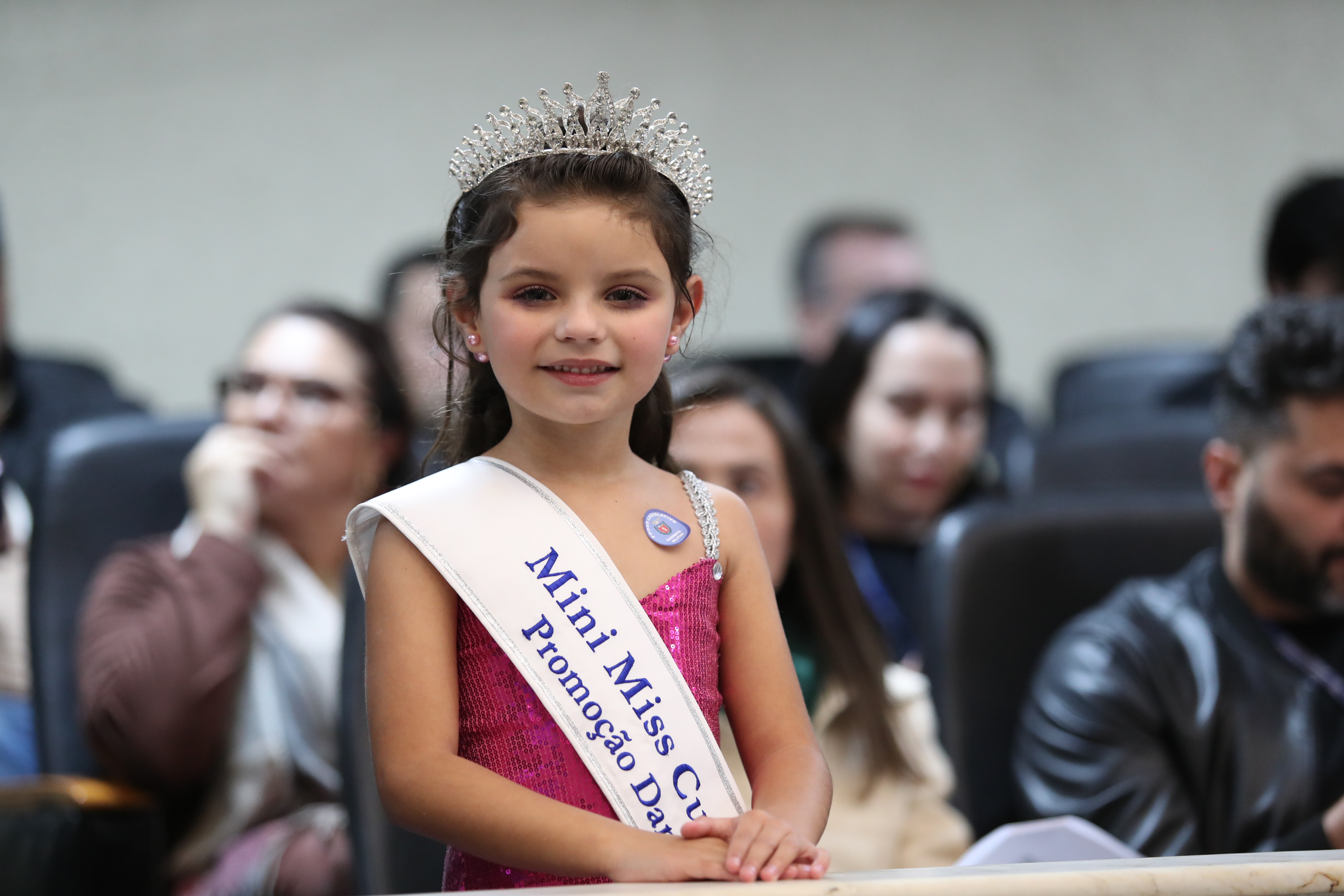
Mini Miss Curitiba winner Milena Rayzel Simioni in 2024

A child beauty pageant is a beauty contest featuring contestants under 18 years of age. Competition categories may include talent, interview, sportswear, casual wear, swimwear, western wear, theme wear, outfit of choice, decade wear, and evening wear. Depending on the type of pageant, contestants may wear makeup or false teeth as well as elaborate hairstyles and custom-designed fitted outfits to present their routines on stage.

Child beauty pageants are controversial, due to the treatment and sexualization of the child contestants.

== History ==
Beauty pageants started in 1921 when the owner of an Atlantic City hotel struck upon the idea to help boost tourism. However, that idea had already circulated through "Most Beautiful Child" contests held in major cities across the country. The Little Miss America pageant began in the 1960s at Palisades Amusement Park in New Jersey. Originally, it was for young people from 13 to 17 years old, but by 1964 there were over 35,000 participants, which prompted an age division. The modern child beauty pageant emerged in the early 1960s, held in Miami, Florida. Since then, the industry has grown to include about 250,000 pageants.

It has grown from the senior beauty pageants, previously originating from South America, in particular in Venezuela, to become an event held throughout the world for young boys and girls, with an emphasis on competitions being popularized by mainstream media in the United States, to much criticism.

The murder of JonBenét Ramsey in late 1996 turned the public spotlight onto child beauty pageants. Critics began to question the ethics of parents who would present their child in a way that was perhaps not suitable for their age. In 2001, American Network HBO aired its Emmy-winning Living Dolls: The Making of a Child Beauty Queen, which garnered much attention. Additionally, TLC, also an American network, has created shows such as Toddlers & Tiaras and King of the Crown, the former dedicated to the world of high glitz child pageantry and the latter to the world of pageant coaching.

== Types ==
While most beauty pageants cater strictly to girls, there is a growing number that includes boys as well. Often, age divisions for boys run through age 6 with very few going beyond that due to lack of participation and public perception. Age divisions will often have names such as "Baby Miss", "Petite Miss", "Little Miss" and more. Age divisions are generally broken as follows: 0–11 months, 12–23 months, 1–3 years, 4–6 years, 7–9 years, 10–12 years, 13–15 years, and 16–18 years. For boys, sometimes two age divisions would be merged such as 0–3 years, 4–6 years, etc.

Depending on which type of pageant system is entered, contestants will spend about two hours or less in the actual competition. Typically, pageants have a guideline of "no more than one and a half minutes on stage" per child for beauty or formalwear and other modeling-based events. Talent usually is limited to two minutes or less with the rare exception of allowing two and a half to three minutes.

In contrast, natural pageants have fairly strict guidelines regarding clothing, makeup, hair extensions, etc. Programs such as National American Miss forbid any makeup other than non-shiny lipgloss and mascara for girls on stage. This modeling style is often referred to as "Miss America-style". Some pageants have a prescribed set of movements while others allow a little more latitude in how girls will use the stage or runway.

All pageants have slightly different guidelines, rules, and criteria for what they judge on, and events. Events may include sportswear, swimwear, evening wear, talent, interview, writing skills, and modeling. Children are critiqued on "individuality, capability, poise, and confidence." They compete to win a variety of prizes, such as electronics, toys, scholarships and grants, cash, tiaras, sashes, robes, and trophies. Trophies can be taller than the contestants themselves; in the "Our Little Miss" pageant, the World level trophies can be 5 to 6 feet (1.5 to 1.8 m) tall. There is a queen for every age division, and there are Ultimate Grand Supreme awards, and Mini Supreme queens for certain blocks of age divisions (0–5, 6–11, 12–16, 17 and up). There are also side awards and overall side awards.

A rising trend in pageantry is the online, specialty or mail-in pageant. Social media sites like Facebook have many photo contest and pageant pages where contestant's photos are judged by how many "likes" they receive. There is a website devoted to this type of pageant program. Unlike the live or on-stage counterparts, contestants in an online pageant submit an application and photographs or videos for judging. Judging criteria can include past pageant achievements, numeric scale ratings and essays. Winners may be awarded virtual prizes such downloadable certificates and being featured on a pageant's website or physical prizes and gifts such as tiaras, sashes, medallions, toys and more. Entry fees typically range from $5 to $80 depending on the type, level and scope (local/state/national/international). Many are seasonal or theme-based. Others may be a counterpart to a live or on-stage event.

=== Cost ===
In a glitz pageant, makeup and hair are typically done by a professional makeup artist. Natural pageants do not generally require a professional makeup artist or hair dresser although some girls choose to use them in the older age divisions.

== Criticism ==
Parents are sometimes criticized for entering their children in pageants. By holding very young girls to a "beauty" standard involving things such as makeup and spray tans, pageants are seen as reinforcing a very superficial, modern type of femininity. One sociologist, Shelby Colene Pannell, questions why parents would willingly subject their children to gender socialization in such an extreme form.

Families on TLC's television series Toddlers & Tiaras are subject to intense criticism for negatively influencing their children that their physical appearance will score them attention and prizes. The show first aired in 2009 and follows the child participants and their parents as they prepare for the upcoming beauty pageant of the weekend. The show is non-narrated to avoid showing opinion and has sparked heavy controversy due to actions including allowing a child to smoke a fake cigarette during the talent portion of the competition, forcing a child to wear fake breasts, a parent who allowed her child to dress like a prostitute in the "outfit of choice" category, and waxing/threading a child's facial and body hair to give them a glowing appearance on stage.

=== Commodification of children ===
Some critics of child beauty pageants say the pageants promote children as products used for the benefit of commercial gain. Parents spend money on clothing, hair, makeup, and accessories in return for a cash prize.

=== Sexualization ===
In preparation for these beauty pageants, children have their appearances altered by costumes, makeup, and other products which can sexualize them at a very young age. Certain pageants encourage contestants to emulate grown women, applying heavy makeup to create full lips, long eyelashes, and flushed cheeks, wearing high heels and revealing "evening gowns", and doing provocative dance steps, poses or facial expressions. These things are not only preferred but expected if a child is to win the contest.

The children participating in beauty contests may learn that they gain attention and status when being sexualized. The child perceives that sexuality is not only encouraged but can be a means to an end.

"When you have them looking older, for a lot of people that means looking sexier. I don't think it's a great idea for girls at that age to be focused so much on their sexuality," Syd Brown, a youth psychologist practicing in Maryland told ABC News. "If you're telling a 6-year-old to act like a 16-year-old, you're telling her to be seductive and to be sexy."

=== Defense ===
Regardless of the criticism, parents still defend their reasons for letting their young children participate in these pageants. Hillary Levy, an undergraduate researcher at Harvard University, found that many parents felt that their children, even males, were able to gain poise and confidence in front of a group. Parents of children with birth defects felt as though it was not a negative experience but instead, a way for their children to interact with others and not feel as if they were different.

Many parents believe that beauty pageants teach their children to always perform their very best and boost their self-esteem. These parents believe that a pageant should not be viewed as anything other than another extra-curricular activity because it teaches children basic life values such as self-confidence, sportsmanship, determination, and leadership that any other sport or activity outside of school would do, and what matters is if a child is raised in a healthy environment surrounded by good people and good morals.

== Law ==
Lindsay Lieberman, the author of "Protecting Pageant Princesses: A Call for Statutory Regulation of Child Beauty Pageants", argues that there should be regulations on how child beauty pageants are run because the effects on children can be damaging. In her article, Lieberman touches upon points that concern the lifestyles that children who compete in pageants have going on while competing such as stress and anxiety as well as problems they will have later on in the future such as depression, lowered self-esteem, and battling eating disorders.

In 2013, France banned pageants for children under the age of 13 years, because they promote the "hyper-sexualisation" of minors. France also voted to regulate pageants for children aged 13–15 (The age of consent in France is 15). France is the first Western country to ban child pageants.

== See also ==
- TLC's reality series Toddlers & Tiaras
- Here Comes Honey Boo Boo, reality television series (TLC, 2012–2014)
- Child model
- JonBenét Ramsey, a six-year-old murder victim whose participation in child beauty pageants was a major source of public interest
