= Sextuplets Take New York =

- Directed by: Monica Lange
- Starring: The Carpio family
- Country of origin: United States
- Original language: English
- No. of seasons: 1
- No. of episodes: 8

Production
- Executive producers: Kirk Streb; Deanie Wilcher
- Producer: Monica Lange
- Production locations: New York, United States
- Editor: Bonnie Cutler-Shear
- Running time: 23 minutes
- Production company: Figure 8 Productions

Original release
- Network: TLC
- Release: September 14 – October 5, 2010

Related
- Quints By Surprise; Kate Plus 8

Sextuplets Take New York is an American reality television series which premiered on TLC on September 14, 2010. The show features the Carpio family, consisting of parents Victor and Digna and their seven children, including sextuplets, the first Latino set born in America. The series follows the family through their daily lives, focusing on the challenges of raising multiple children in a modest home in Queens, New York. The family originally appeared in a one-hour episode of Multitude of Multiples.

== Family history ==
Victor and Digna Carpio are both immigrants to America. As a child, Digna was sent by her divorced parents to the Ecuadorian mountains to work. When she emigrated to New York she spoke no English. Victor Carpio works as a maintenance man for the city Parks Department, and the family lives on his income (about $1800 per month).

The Carpio sextuplets are billed as America's first Latino sextuplets, and are bilingual, speaking both Spanish and English. They were born 15 weeks premature, and several of them suffer medical issues as a consequence.

== Family ==
Older Brother - September 16, 2000 (age 26)

- Jhancarlos

Sextuplets - October 6, 2008 (age 18)

- Jaden Ivan
- Joel Alberth
- Jezreel Eliceo
- Justin Leo
- Genesis Victoria
- Danelia Victoria

== Production ==
When the first season began filming, the sextuplets were 22 months old.

== Episodes ==
=== Special (2009) ===
Title	Original release date
"Multitude of Multiples"	August 30, 2009

=== Season 1 (2010) ===
No.	Title	Original release date
1	"Loca Life"	September 14, 2010
2	"Traffic, Trims and Transportation"	September 21, 2010
3	"Eyes & Appetites"	September 21, 2010
4	"Toddlers, Tests & Triumphs"	September 28, 2010
5	"Shop, Swim, Shimmy"	September 28, 2010
6	"Out on the Town"	October 5, 2010
7	"Change of Plans"	October 5, 2010
