= Living Dolls: The Making of a Child Beauty Queen =

2001 film by Shari Cookson

- Directed by: Shari Cookson
- Written by: Shari Cookson
- Produced by: Shari Cookson; Jean Guest; Linda Otto
- Starring: Swan Brooner; Robin Browne; Michael Butler; Shane King; Leslie Butler
- Distributed by: HBO
- Release date: May 13, 2001
- Country: United States
- Language: English

Living Dolls: The Making of a Child Beauty Queen is a 2001 HBO documentary film on child beauty pageants directed by Shari Cookson. The film is part of HBO's America Undercover series.

The documentary follows five-year-old beauty contestant Swan Brooner and her mother, Robin Browne throughout the year of 1999 as Brooner moves from a pageant in Cape Coral, Florida to the higher profile southern pageants. The film further explore the sexualization element prominent despite pageant contestants' young age.

The documentary later focuses on Alabama residents and beauty pageant coaches Michael Butler and his partner Shane King, along with Butler's seven-year-old daughter, Leslie, who has won 27 national titles in her pageant span. Browne, who worked three jobs and had already spent $60,000 on her daughter's pageant career, hired Butler and King to help Brooner reach the next level of pageant competition. Browne ultimately reported spending more than $70,000 despite Brooner's young age.
