= Belle Collective: Birmingham =

2026 American television series

- Country of origin: United States
- Original language: English
- No. of seasons: 1
- No. of episodes: 8

Production
- Executive producer: Carlos King
- Production company: Kingdom Reign Entertainment

Original release
- Network: Oprah Winfrey Network
- Release: April 10, 2026 – present

Related
- Belle Collective

Belle Collective: Birmingham is an American reality television series. The series premiered on Oprah Winfrey Network on April 11, 2026. It is a spin-off of Belle Collective. The show follows the lives of businesswomen in Birmingham, Alabama.

== Cast ==
The businesswomen on the show are:

- Stormi Steele
- Amber Jones
- Tiffaney Jones
- Funmi Ford
- K’la Inman

== Episodes ==
=== Season 1 (2026) ===
No. overall	No. in series	Title	Original release date
1	1	"A Storm's A-Brewing"	April 10, 2026
2	2	"Tiff Happens"	April 17, 2026
3	3	"The Live Before the Storm"	April 24, 2026
4	4	"Countdown to Chaos"	May 1, 2026
5	5	"Stir the Pot, Taste the Mess"	May 8, 2026
6	6	"Nightmare on Estate Street"	May 15, 2026
7	7	"The Last Supper"	May 22, 2026
8	8	"Reunion: Power, Pressure and Betrayal"	May 29, 2026
