= Police Women (TV series) =

American reality TV series

- Genre: Documentary
- Country of origin: United States

Production
- Executive producers: Jon Beyer; Julie Laughlin-Jones; Julie Link; Tom Forman
- Running time: 40 to 44 minutes (excluding commercials)
- Production company: RelativityREAL

Original release
- Network: TLC; OWN
- Release: August 6, 2009 – April 13, 2013

Police Women is a collective title of an American reality documentary series on the TLC network that follows female members of law enforcement agencies in different communities, at work and at home. Camera crews film them doing their everyday jobs. It is similar in most respects to COPS, a long-running reality show on the Fox Network that also documents the work of police agencies in the United States.

== Series ==
- Police Women of Broward County (August 6, 2009 – October 15, 2009) is the first of these series, which focuses on four female deputies of the Broward County Sheriff's Office in Broward County, Florida: Detectives Julie Bower (1st & 2nd season), Andrea Penoyer (1st & 2nd season) and Ana Murillo (1st season), Deputy Erica Huerta ( 2nd season) and Sergeant Shelunda Cooper (1st & 2nd season). The first season was telecast August 6, 2009 to October 15, 2009; a second season of this series was broadcast April 7, 2011 to July 6, 2011.
- Police Women of Maricopa County (February 25, 2010 – May 5, 2010) is the second series, which follows four female deputies of the Maricopa County Sheriff's Office in Maricopa County, Arizona: Detectives Deborah Moyer and Lindsey Smith, and Deputies Kelly Bocardo and Amie Duong.
- Police Women of Memphis (May 27, 2010 – July 29, 2010) is the third series, which follows four female officers of the Memphis Police Department in Memphis, Tennessee: Officers Aubrey Olson, Arica Logan, Joy Jefferson and Virginia Awkward.
- Police Women of Dallas (October 28, 2010 – February 23, 2014) is the fourth series, which follows five female officers of the Dallas Police Department in Dallas, Texas: Sergeant Tracy Jones, Senior Corporal Melissa Person and officers Beth Burnside, Mia Shagena and Sara Ramsey. The second season features three new officers: Senior Corporal Cheryl Matthews, Detective Angela Nordyke, and Officer Yvette Gonzales.
- Police Women of Cincinnati (January 13, 2011 – March 3, 2011) is the fifth city in the series, which follows four female officers of the Cincinnati Police Department in Cincinnati, Ohio: Sergeant Tia Pearson, Officer Colleen Deegan, Officer Mandy Curfiss and Officer Rose Valentino.
- Police Women of St. Louis County was a possible candidate for the sixth installment of the series but no news about the series has been released in over a year.

== Clip specials ==
Between the Cincinnati and second Broward County series, TLC presented three clip specials, featuring the best moments from the first five seasons of the series.

- Police Women: Most Unforgettable Chases (March 17, 2011) – Features ten of the most-exciting chases.
- Police Women: Most Outrageous Criminals (March 24, 2011) – A selection of ten memorable criminals, characters and perpetrators.
- Police Women: Most Amazing Arrests (March 31, 2011) – The ten most memorable arrests.
