= Sweet Home Sextuplets =

American reality show

- Genre: Reality TV
- Starring: Eric Waldrop; Courtney Waldrop; Saylor Waldrop; Bridge Waldrop; Wales Waldrop; Blu Waldrop; Layke Waldrop; Rawlings Waldrop; Rayne Waldrop; Tag Waldrop; Rivers Waldrop
- Country of origin: United States
- Original language: English
- No. of seasons: 3
- No. of episodes: 24

Production
- Running time: 45 minutes

Original release
- Network: TLC
- Release: 18 September 2018 – 27 October 2020

Sweet Home Sextuplets is an American reality series on TLC starring Eric and Courtney Waldrop, parents of a 3-3 set of sextuplets in Alabama. The series debuted on September 18, 2018.

== Synopsis ==
The Waldrop family consists of Eric and Courtney Waldrop; eldest son Saylor; twin boys Bridge and Wales; and sextuplets Blu, Layke, Rawlings, Rayne, Tag, and Rivers. The family announced on YouTube that they will not continue filming the show.

Eric and Courtney becoming pregnant with the twins (second pregnancy) and the sextuplets (third pregnancy).

Courtney delivered the sextuplets via Caesarean section 30 weeks into the pregnancy.

== Cast ==
- Eric Waldrop (b. 1981)
- Courtney Waldrop (b. 1982)

The big brother

- Saylor Waldrop (b. 2009)

The twins

- Bridge Ryder Waldrop (b. 2012)
- Wales Tucker Waldrop (b. 2012)

The sextuplets

- Blu Wellington Waldrop, baby A, boy, 2 lbs, 8 oz (b. 12/11/2017 1:47 pm)
- Layke Bryars Waldrop, baby B, boy, 2 lbs, 11 oz (b. 12/11/2017 1:48 pm)
- Rawlings McClaine Waldrop, baby C, girl, 2 lbs, 11 oz (b. 12/11/2017 1:49 pm)
- Rayne McCoy Waldrop, baby D, girl, 2 lbs, 12 oz (b. 12/11/2017 1:50 pm)
- Tag Bricker Waldrop, baby E, boy, 2 lbs, 4 oz (b. 12/11/2017 1:51 pm)
- Rivers McCall Waldrop, baby F, girl, 2 lbs, 13 oz (b. 12/11/2017 1:52 pm)

== Episodes ==
=== Series overview ===
Season	Episodes	Originally released	
Season	Episodes	First released	Last released
1	6	September 18, 2018	October 23, 2018
2	8	May 23, 2019	July 16, 2019
3	10	June 16, 2020	October 27, 2020

=== Season 1 (2018) ===
No. overall	No. in season	Title	Original release date	US viewers (millions)
1	1	"We're Having SIX-Tuplets"	September 18, 2018	N/A
Courtney and Eric Waldrop are preparing to give birth to a set of 3-3 sextuplets, while managing the three boys they already have.
2	2	"When you're Expecting 6 Babies"	September 25, 2018	N/A
Courtney delivers the six babies via Cesarean sections and the babies spend time in the NICU. The babies come home, and Layke is diagnosed with ventricular septal defect.
3	3	"A Mother's Day Surprise"	October 2, 2018	N/A
The sextuplets make their first public appearance at church for Mother's Day.
4	4	"A Whole New Ballgame"	October 9, 2018	N/A
Layke and Rivers go to the cardiologist for consultations. Courtney and Eric try to make sure the older kids get the attention they need.
5	5	"Milestones and Meltdowns"	October 16, 2018	N/A
The family finally gets a van large enough for the entire family. The babies turn 6 months old and the twins graduate kindergarten.
6	6	"No Finish Line with Nine"	October 23, 2018	N/A
The babies try baby food for the first time. Courtney grapples with what to do about her maternity leave ending. The family sponsors a charity 5K.

=== Season 2 (2019) ===
No. overall	No. in season	Title	Original release date	US viewers (millions)
7	1	"We Survived a Year, Barely"	May 23, 2019	N/A
Celebrating the sextuplets' first birthday! The family struggles with outgrowing their home.
8	2	"Miracles and Meltdowns"	June 4, 2019	N/A
The babies visit Santa for the first time.
9	3	"Holding On and Letting Go"	June 11, 2019	N/A
The older boys share their birthday party. Courtney struggles with trying to be present for the older boys while watching the babies.
10	4	"The Flu Scare"	June 18, 2019	N/A
The household suffers from the flu. Layke has a follow-up with the cardiologist.
11	5	"Valentines - Times Nine!"	June 25, 2019	N/A
The family tries to conquer their first meal at a restaurant with the babies and Valentine's Day dates with the older boys.
12	6	"Vacation: Impossible"	July 2, 2019	N/A
Construction starts on the home and the family heads to Dollywood.
13	7	"A Family Under Construction"	July 9, 2019	N/A
A series of construction fails leaves the family in a lurch.
14	8	"Web of Destruction"	July 16, 2019	N/A
The first trip to the dentist for the babies and a colorful Easter mess.

=== Season 3 (2020) ===
No. overall	No. in season	Title	Original release date	US viewers (millions)
15	1	"A Six-Ring Circus"	June 16, 2020	N/A
The family gears up for Halloween as the Waldrops enter Phase 2 of construction.
16	2	"Karate Kids"	June 23, 2020	N/A
The toddlers head to the zoo for the first time. The twins are interested in karate. The sextuplets start preschool.
17	3	"Time for Time Outs"	June 30, 2020	N/A
The toddlers get to be in their former babysitter's wedding.
18	4	"Toddlers and Turkeys"	July 7, 2020	N/A
As Thanksgiving approaches, the family moves into a mobile home so construction can begin on their house.
19	5	"30,000 Dirty Diapers"	July 14, 2020	N/A
Courtney contemplates one giant birthday party for all 9 kids and begins working on potty training. Construction is in full swing on the main house.
20	6	"Mobile Home for the Holidays"	September 29, 2020	N/A
The Waldrops bring the holiday spirit with a visit to see Santa.
21	7	"Tumbles and Tornadoes"	October 6, 2020	N/A
The family weathers tornado season in Alabama and the kids partake in a family "six-athalon."
22	8	"Six Little Dates"	October 13, 2020	N/A
Eric and Courtney take the sextuplets on individual dates.
23	9	"Coronavirus Crisis"	October 20, 2020	N/A
Production shuts down and the Waldrops film themselves.
24	10	"Survival Mode"	October 27, 2020	N/A
The family moves back into their house, but Eric and Courtney are still without a bedroom.
