= Sara Gore =

TV host

Sara Gore is an American television host who works as a lifestyle host for NBC and its independent production arm, LXTV.

== Early life and education ==
Gore grew up in Lake George, New York, and attended Marymount Manhattan College as a Communications Major and Business/Theater Minor, graduating summa cum laude.

== Career ==
Early in her career, Gore worked in the culinary field as a personal chef and as a line cook for chef/restaurateur, Jean-Georges Vongerichten. She has appeared in cooking segments on The Today Show, The Martha Stewart Show and on her own Emmy-nominated show Recipe Revamp. Sara has appeared on the Food Network as a guest judge on Worst Cooks in America: Celebrity Edition and as a regular guest judge on Beat Bobby Flay.

She is the host of NBC's real estate and design show, Open House, showcasing luxury properties and celebrity homes across the New York City area and the nation.

Gore also hosts New York Live, NBC4 New York's daily lifestyle series covering fashion, celebrity news and interviews, top food and restaurant choices, as well as entertainment. Gore recently launched New York Live: Prime Time Edition which airs Friday nights on NBC4. She has also hosted NBC's First Look Live on the Red Carpet Specials for the Golden Globes, Primetime Emmy Awards, and other live specials under NBC Universal.

In 2021, she joined Ryan Serhant's New York real estate firm SERHANT., working in the SERHANT. Signature division.
