= Big Hair Alaska =

- Genre: Reality
- Country of origin: United States
- Original language: English
- No. of episodes: 2

Production
- Camera setup: Multiple
- Running time: 22 minutes
- Production company: Half Yard Productions

Original release
- Network: TLC
- Release: September 20, 2011

Big Hair Alaska is an American reality television special that aired on the TLC cable network, on September 20, 2011. The subject of the special was the Beehive Beauty Shop in Wasilla, Alaska.

== Episodes ==
No.	Title	Original release date
1	"Back on My Feet"	September 20, 2011
Beehive Beauty Salon in Wasilla, Alaska receives different clientele everyday, ranging from government officials to bridal parties.
2	"Help Wanted"	September 20, 2011
The staff struggles to fit the needs of a roller derby, while the salon sets up interviews for a new stylist.
