= Houston Beauty =

- Genre: Reality
- Starring: Glenda Jemison
- Country of origin: United States
- Original language: English
- No. of seasons: 1
- No. of episodes: 8

Production
- Executive producers: Lindsey Bannister; Paul Reitano; Terrence Sacchi
- Running time: 39 to 42 minutes
- Production company: Park Slope Productions

Original release
- Network: Oprah Winfrey Network
- Release: November 2 – December 20, 2013

Houston Beauty is an American reality television series that airs on the Oprah Winfrey Network and premiered on November 2, 2013. It chronicles the lives of Glenda "Ms. J" Jemison, the owner and director of Franklin Beauty School, and also encompasses some of the hardships the students face outside of the classroom plus the drama that occurs between them. Franklin Beauty School is the oldest continuously operated licensed beauty school in Texas.

== Cast ==
- Glenda "Ms. J" Jemison
- Ms. Eley
- Ms. Burns
- Mia Ryan
- Neil Cain
- Queensley Felix
- Corey Ford
- Grace
- Jessica
- Blair
- Shamika
- Mia C

== Episodes ==
No.	Title	Original release date	U.S. viewers (millions)
0	"Pilot"	November 2, 2013	N/A
The staff is having a difficult time keeping the students focused before the school's yearly hair show.
1	"Gone with the Wind Fabulous"	November 9, 2013	0.63
In the series premiere of Houston Beauty, the school welcomes the newest batch of freshmen. Queensley has an attitude that doesn't mesh well with her classmates, especially Corey. Ms. J tries to keep everything peaceful during all the chaos.
2	"Queen for a Day"	November 16, 2013	N/A
After Ms. J was forced to put her foot down, the students come together to compose a surprise for her but her overly curious nature threatens to ruin it.
3	"You Said **** My Momma?"	November 21, 2013	N/A
The students are going around saying Queensley said rude things about Ms. J. Later, Queensley and Ms. J come head-to-head in the parking lot.
4	"Queensarella & a Whole Lotta Shade"	November 23, 2013	0.56
Mia disagrees with the other students when they come up with the idea for keeping Queensley out of the group. Mia ends up going missing and Ms. J feels that Mia might have gone back to her previous ways.
6	"Trouble on the Ranch"	November 30, 2013	N/A
Ms. J takes the students on a field trip for their wild west photo shoot. Queensley gets into another argument with Corey A. Ford. Mia jumps into the fight to clear things up.
-	"The Franklin Family Holiday Special"	December 6, 2013	N/A
Ms. J and the rest of the crew at Franklin discuss the drama of the past.
7	"Beauty School Bootcamp"	December 13, 2013	N/A
Ms. J creates a beauty school boot camp after she witnessed the altercation at the ranch. Mia's return to the school could possibly cause tension again.
8	"Hair Today, Gone Tomorrow"	December 20, 2013	0.59
All the students compete to win the position of creative director for the upcoming hair show. Queensley makes her return. Everyone puts the drama aside so they can focus on their work.
