= Little Singles =

Television series

- Genre: Reality
- Country of origin: United States
- Original language: English
- No. of seasons: 1
- No. of episodes: 10

Production
- Camera setup: Multi-camera
- Production companies: Shed Media; Warner Bros. Television Studios

Original release
- Network: TLC
- Release: June 15, 2026 – present

Little Singles is an American reality television series that premiered on June 15, 2026, and is produced by Shed Media and aired on TLC. The series features several young adults with dwarfism navigating dating life as singles. It stars John L. Ferguson, Stephanie Vrettakos, Sammy Replogle, Krista Sulaica, and JJ Jordana James.

== Episodes ==
No.	Title	Original release date
1	"Palm Desert-ed"	June 15, 2026
2	"Mirage a Trois"	June 22, 2026
3	"Palm Springs State of Mind Games"	June 29, 2026
4	"Sandals, Scandals, and Secrets"	July 6, 2026
5	"Feta-d Up in Paradise"	July 13, 2026
6	"Drama in the Dry Heat"	July 20, 2026
7	"Desert Heat and Cold Shoulders"	July 27, 2026
8	"Keep Calm and Stay Shady"	August 3, 2026
9	"Playing Dirty in the Desert"	August 10, 2026
10	"What Happens in Palm Springs..."	August 17, 2026
