= Police Women of Broward County =

- Ana Murillo, Shelunda Cooper, Julie Bower and Andrea Penoyer (from left)
- Genre: Documentary
- Country of origin: United States
- No. of seasons: 2
- No. of episodes: 24

Production
- Running time: 40 to 43 minutes (excluding commercials)

Original release
- Network: TLC
- Release: October 3, 2009 – February 26, 2011

Related
- Police Women of Maricopa County

Police Women of Broward County is the first of TLC's Police Women reality documentary series, which follows four female members of the Broward County Sheriff's Office (BSO) in Broward County, Florida.

The series features four women, following them at their jobs as law enforcement officials and at home with their families. Throughout the show, the officers provide commentary on the particular incidents shown that they were involved in. Both seasons of the series features Julie Bower, Shelunda Cooper, and Andrea Penoyer. The first season featured Ana Murillo, who was replaced in season 2 with Erika Huerta.

== Cast ==
- Julie Bower – A 13-year, well-respected veteran of the BSO, Bower is a 48-year-old detective who works exclusively on solving sex crimes and missing person cases. Bower's other previous assignments include the Dive Rescue Team, the Strategic Enforcement Team, road patrol, field-training deputy, and adviser for the BSO Explorer program.
- Shelunda Cooper – Rookie Shelunda is 25 and newly married to another BSO deputy, "J.C." Her twin sister, Shanda, also works as a BSO deputy.
- Andrea Penoyer – Andrea is a 26-year-old deputy for the BSO, who is also back in school studying for a B.A. in public administration. During the first season Andrea was a single mother with her 8-year-old son, Dominic. Between seasons, she became engaged with a single father with two children.
- Erika Huerta – Replacing Deputy Murillo in the second season, native Floridian Erika Huerta is a deputy who currently lives in Miami; she has been a BSO deputy for the last three years.
- Ana Murillo – Present only in the first season, Ana is a 28-year-old deputy for the BSO, assigned to the Strategic Enforcement Team. She is married with a 3-year-old son, Anthony; however, she frequently cares for him herself, as her husband is often out of the country for work.

Note: Unless specified, all ages given reflect the first season of this series.

== Episodes ==
=== Series overview ===
| Season | Episodes | Originally released | |
| Season | Episodes | First released | Last released |
|---|---|---|---|
| 1 | 11 | October 26, 2009 | March 29, 2010 |
| 2 | 13 | September 13, 2011 | August 15, 2012 |

=== Season 1 (2009–2010) ===
| No. overall | No. in season | Title | Original release date |
|---|---|---|---|
| 1 | 1 | "Hell of a Cop" | October 26, 2009 |
The cops take down a drug dealer, discovering drugs on a stripper, going undercover as a prostitute and investigating a bloody fight.
| 2 | 2 | "That Wasn't Me Running!" | November 2, 2009 |
The cops use a canine to help uncover evidence, investigating an alleged rape, outrunning a criminal, and arresting a drunk driver.
| 3 | 3 | "Another One Bites the Dust" | November 9, 2009 |
The cops stop a woman that claims wind blew marijuana into her bra, arresting two rape suspects and searching for a third.
| 4 | 4 | "I Hope Somebody Runs..." | November 16, 2009 |
The cops catch two burglary suspects, bringing down a drug house, confronting a rape victim with an unlikely suspect.
| 5 | 5 | "Super Hot Blonde" | November 23, 2009 |
The cops go undercover to buy crack, arrest a man for using an internet escort service to pay for sex.
| 6 | 6 | "Don't Call Me Baby" | January 4, 2010 |
The cops stakeout crack dealers, tracking down a couple accused of rape.
| 7 | 7 | "Welcome to the Real World" | January 11, 2010 |
The cops catch a drug dealer, tracking down a sex offender who has violated his parole.
| 8 | 8 | "Let's Get the Next Customer" | February 8, 2010 |
The cops arrest a drug dealer, tracking down a suspected statutory rapist, chasing down a perpetrator and gathering evidence after a robbery.
| 9 | 9 | "Strip Search Me!" | February 15, 2010 |
The cops bust prostitutes who are soliciting clients on the internet.
| 10 | 10 | "Are You Kidding Me?" | March 22, 2010 |
The cops chase down a suspected rapist, arresting a drug dealer and a buyer, closing down a known drug house and mediating a violent argument.
| 11 | 11 | "Best Takedowns" | March 29, 2010 |
A clip show showcasing ten of the first season's best arrests.

=== Season 2 (2011–2012) ===
| No. overall | No. in season | Title | Original release date |
|---|---|---|---|
| 12 | 1 | "Justice Has Been Served" | September 13, 2011 |
The cops bust a suspected drug dealer who brings his toddler daughter with him
| 13 | 2 | "A 50,000 Volt Mistake" | September 20, 2011 |
The cops deal with a bystander who refuses to cooperate.
| 14 | 3 | "Girl Cops Rule!" | October 11, 2011 |
The cops take down a suspected drug dealer, race to a shooting call about a domestic dispute.
| 15 | 4 | "A Surprise Party With Guns!" | November 1, 2011 |
The cops chase down a suspect in an elaborate drug bust, get called to a drunken disputes.
| 16 | 5 | "Best Mom Out Here" | November 8, 2011 |
The cops participate in a complex drug sting, intervene in a dispute.
| 17 | 6 | "Early Bird Gets the Worm" | November 29, 2011 |
The cops chase down a suspect who leads them to a fully stocked drug house.
| 18 | 7 | "You Can't Karate Chop a Car" | June 27, 2012 |
The cops must chase down a suspected arsonist, find a human trafficking victim, stop a reckless bicyclist and assist in an undercover buy bust.
| 19 | 8 | "You're My Kind of Woman for christmas" | July 11, 2012 |
The cops join forces with SWAT to a stake-out of a suspected cocaine dealer.
| 20 | 9 | "These Are Not Cookies" | July 18, 2012 |
The cops take down a suspected prescription pill dealer, encounter drunken revelers, pose as prostitutes and search for the truth behind an alleged rape case.
| 21 | 10 | "Tore Up From the Floor" | July 25, 2012 |
The cops chase a rampant car, arrest a man wanted for trafficking in oxycodone.
| 22 | 11 | "We Got a Drama Queen" | August 1, 2012 |
The cops bust a pothouse, encounter an intoxicated woman in need of assistance.
| 23 | 12 | "These Are Somebody Else's Pants" | August 8, 2012 |
The cops prevent a suspected crack-dealer from fleeing, go on a scavenger hunt throughout an apartment complex.
| 24 | 13 | "This Too Shall Pass" | August 15, 2012 |
The cops apprehend a barber student tries to sell marijuana, a pregnant runaway wanted for stealing cars and work on the case of a hotel maintenance man.
