= I Found the Gown =

- Genre: Reality
- Created by: Rick and Leslie DeAngelo
- Ending theme: "In Front of Me" by Shayna Zaid & The Catch
- Country of origin: United States
- Original language: English
- No. of seasons: 3
- No. of episodes: 44

Production
- Producer: Half Yard Productions

Original release
- Network: TLC
- Release: August 24, 2012 – July 1, 2014

I Found the Gown is an American wedding dress shop reality series airing on TLC as part of that network's Friday evening "wedding block" of programming. The series films at "VOWS Bridal Outlet", a discount wedding dress shop in Watertown, Massachusetts in suburban Boston which has existed since 1992.

== Show ==
The program mainly chronicles two aspects: the owners of VOWS, Rick and Leslie DeAngelo searching for discounted and discontinued dresses in back rooms and department store warehouses to sell, and the brides that come to the store searching for the deeply discounted dress of their dreams and the experience of the shop. Generally the name-brand designer gowns sell for 50-80% off their original pricing.

The show premiered on August 24, 2012, and was renewed for a second season, which began on April 19, 2013.

== Reception ==
Tom Conroy of Media Life Magazine called the show painless and inoffensive but cited its apparent appeal to audiences as inexplicable.
