= Belle Collective =

2021 American television series

- Country of origin: United States
- Original language: English
- No. of seasons: 7
- No. of episodes: 73

Production
- Executive producers: Carlos King, Slane Hatch
- Production company: Kingdom Reign Entertainment

Original release
- Network: Oprah Winfrey Network
- Release: January 15, 2021 – present

Related
- Belle Collective: Birmingham

Belle Collective is an American reality television series. The series premiered on Oprah Winfrey Network on January 15, 2021. The show follows the lives of businesswomen in Jackson, Mississippi.

== Cast ==
The businesswomen on the show are:

- Tambra Cherie (season 1-)
- Dr. Antoinette Liles (season 1)
- Latrice Rogers (season 1-)
- Lateshia Pearson (season 1-)
- Marie Hamilton-Abston (season 1-)
- Aikisha Holly Colon (seasons 2-5)
- Sophia "SoGucci" Williams (seasons 2-5)
- Selena Johnson (season 5-)
- Kerri Paul (season 6-)

Complete Cast Members from Belle Collective
Belles	Seasons						
Belles	1	2	3	4	5	6	7
Tambra Cherie	Main						
Latrice Rogers	Main						
Lateshia Pearson	Main						
Marie Hamilton-Abston	Main						
Dr. Antoinette Liles	Main				Guest		
Aikisha Holly Colon		Main					
Sophia "SoGucci" Williams		Main					
Selena Johnson			Guest		Main		
Kerri Paul						Main	

== Episodes ==
Season	Episodes	Originally released	
Season	Episodes	First released	Last released
1	11	January 15, 2021	March 26, 2021
2	11	July 29, 2022	October 7, 2022
3	12	May 19, 2023	August 11, 2023
4	11	November 10, 2023	January 19, 2024
5	10	November 1, 2024	January 3, 2025
6	8	October 3, 2025	November 21, 2025
7	10	February 13, 2026	April 17, 2026

=== Season 1 (2021) ===
No. overall	No. in series	Title	Original release date
1	1	"Welcome to Mississippi!"	January 29, 2021
Lateshia brings successful business women together for a brunch. Two of the guests have issues at the brunch.
2	2	"Wigs and Waffles"	January 22, 2021
Tambra helps Lateshia. Marie and Latrice have issues at Tambra's birthday party as Antoinette tries to get over her divorce.
3	3	"Sisters in the Struggle"	January 29, 2021
Lateshia and Antoinette have some challenges as Tambra is pressured to have children. Marie has problems in her marriage and her oldest son. Latrice clashes with Cliff over business.
4	4	"Bad Brunch Behavior"	February 5, 2021
Tambra has to decide between her family and business. Marie attends counseling. Racial tensions ruin Lateshia's brunch plan.
5	5	"No Yams"	February 12, 2021
All of the women feel their feelings. Glen is annoyed with Lateshia ignoring their home. Latrice feels abandoned by her brother. Marie defends herself.
6	6	"Sage and Champagne"	February 19, 2021
Latrice is wary of Marie during Lateshia's pitch. Antoinette hosts a party as Tambra gets shocking news.
7	7	"Sistervention"	February 26, 2021
Lateshia's reputation is destroyed by gossip and Marie's behavior. Tambra stages an intervention as a result.
8	8	"Contracts and Balances"	March 5, 2021
Glen has many demands that Lateshia tries to counter with a distraction.
9	9	"Sip & See"	March 12, 2021
Lateshia still has problems. Marie and Latrice meet face to face as Marie opens a new business and Latrice has a launch party. Antoinette has fears that she won't be ready for an upcoming business.
10	10	"Reunion Part 1"	March 19, 2021
Part one of two. Reunion between the women.
11	11	"Reunion Part 2"	March 26, 2021
Part two of two. Continuation of the reunion.

=== Season 2 (2022) ===
No. overall	No. in series	Title	Original release date
12	1	"New Belle and New Babies"	July 29, 2022
13	2	"A Meeting in the Men's Room"	August 5, 2022
14	3	"Love, Marriage and No Baby"	August 12, 2022
15	4	"Heir Wars"	August 17, 2022
16	5	"Fresh Starts and Lady Parts"	August 26, 2022
17	6	"Stalk It to Me"	September 2, 2022
18	7	"Not Model Behavior"	September 9, 2022
19	8	"Oops, Marie Did It Again"	September 16, 2022
20	9	"Belle Beginnings and Endings"	September 23, 2022
21	10	"Reunion: Part One"	September 30, 2022
22	11	"Reunion: Part Two"	October 7, 2022

=== Season 3 (2023) ===
No. overall	No. in series	Title	Original release date
23	1	"Zaddy in the Middle"	May 19, 2023
24	2	"Falling Off a Cliff"	May 26, 2023
25	3	"Lyin' & Spyin'"	June 2, 2023
26	4	"Boys 2 Men"	June 9, 2023
27	5	"The Mane Event"	June 16, 2023
28	6	"The Sunjai Also Rises"	June 23, 2023
29	7	"Let There Be Peace"	July 7, 2023
30	8	"The D Isn't Silent"	July 14, 2023
31	9	"D*ckrespectful"	July 21, 2023
32	10	"Best Revenge Is Your Paper"	July 28, 2023
33	11	"Clifton Rogers' Neighborhood"	August 4, 2023
34	12	"Belles, Brunches... and Baby?!"	August 11, 2023

=== Season 4 (2024) ===
No. overall	No. in series	Title	Original release date
35	1	"Belle Biv De Rodeo"	November 10, 2023
36	2	"Bromance Before Romance"	November 17, 2023
37	3	"No Belle Piece Prize"	November 24, 2023
38	4	"Glenning Even"	December 1, 2023
39	5	"Love Under New Management"	December 8, 2023
40	6	"Funk Around and Find Out"	December 15, 2023
41	7	"Ribs with a Side of Beef"	December 22, 2023
42	8	"Capitol Punishment"	December 29, 2023
43	9	"Reunion: Part 1"	January 5, 2024
44	10	"Reunion: Part 2"	January 12, 2024
45	11	"Reunion: Part 3"	April 19, 2024

=== Season 5 (2024-25) ===
No. overall	No. in series	Title	Original release date
46	1	"Correctile Dysfunction"	November 1, 2024
Aikisha tries to stop the drama. Marie learns that her cousins believe that she thinks she's better than them. Latrice surrounds herself with allies.
47	2	"Men-Oh-Pause"	November 8, 2024
Aikisha's business idea complicates her marriage. Latrice argues with Cliff as she builds a bridge with Lateshia. Latrice's plus one to Aikisha's birthday raises eyebrows.
48	3	"Too Legit to Quit"	November 15, 2024
49	4	"Marie/Antoinette"	November 22, 2024
50	5	"Mo'Money, Mo' Problems"	November 29, 2024
51	6	"99 Problems but a Brunch Ain't One"	December 6, 2024
52	7	"The Dee Is No Longer Silent"	December 13, 2024
53	8	"Welcome to Taste, Try the Beef"	December 20, 2024
54	9	"Reunited and It Feels So...Good?"	December 27, 2024
55	10	"State of the Reunion"	January 3, 2025

=== Season 6 (2025) ===
No. overall	No. in series	Title	Original release date
56	1	"Harpo, Who Dis Woman?"	October 3, 2025
Marie's dating life causes chaos at her birthday party when both men show up. Selena is fed up with Mike as Latrice learns about a rumor about Glen.
57	2	"POLYaMARIE"	October 10, 2025
Miscommunication causes problems for everyone. Marie must choose between the two men she is dating. Lateshia brings everyone together for brunch. Selena questions her relationship with Mike and is confronted by Latrice.
58	3	"It Goes Down in the DMs"	October 17, 2025
Selena realizes what all of her issues with Mike stem from. Kerri learns that Matt believes she is neglecting their family. Glen's DMs to Amanda come to light at the Rogers pool party.
59	4	"Trouble in Belle-adise"	October 24, 2025
Marie and Kerri bring comfort to their friend Lateshia after learning of Amanda and Glen. Latrice tries to get as much information from Amanda. Matt wants Kerri to be home more.
60	5	"Biloxi Blues"	October 31, 2025
Kerri invites the group to the Gulf where tensions run high between Lateshia and Latrice.
61	6	"Girls Trippin"	November 7, 2025
Lateshia kicks off her business at Kerri's restaurant. Lateshia and Latrice talk privately. Kerri invites everyone over for a Creole meal.
62	7	"Belle-ieve in Miracles"	November 14, 2025
Glen tries to repair their marriage, but it backfires. Latrice confronts Cliff as Selena mourns her son in his home.
63	8	"Reunion: So Sophisticratchet"	November 21, 2025
Everyone reunites.Tensions cause issues for everyone, resulting in the loss of a friendship. Tambra discusses money issues. Marie and Cedric have problems. Selena shares her grief.

=== Season 7 (2026) ===
No. overall	No. in series	Title	Original release date
64	1	"Poetic Injustice"	February 13, 2026
Marie gets betrayed as Lateshia and Latrice are no longer speaking. Glen's romantic gesture backfires at Kerri's birthday party.
65	2	"Run and Belle That"	February 20, 2026
Lateshia's marriage is in a crisis. Wedding prep stresses out Selena. Kerri and Latrice face business and health problems. The feud between Lateshia and Latrice threatens the collective.
66	3	"Squab-Belle Up"	February 27, 2026
Marie and Shante argue over who has Lateshia's best interests at heart. Kerri suffers from tough love about the restaurant. Glen is sent over the edge due to Lateshia's decision about their marriage. Selena's party has issues due to Lateshia and Latrice's feud.
67	4	"Group Kerrapy"	March 6, 2026
Tambra learns some devastating news about her father. Kerri forces Lateshia and Latrice to hash out their problems while the group is on the Gulf. Cliff is asked to sit down to speak to Glen by Matt.
68	5	"Table for Two, Drama for Ten"	March 13, 2026
Glen sparks a fight with Lateshia's manager during a photo shoot. Latrice and Lateshia talk things out as Latrice learns bad news about her health. Kerri has to make a tough business call.
69	6	"Dearly Belle-loved"	March 20, 2026
A rumor sparks problems for the Collective. Marie is given advice by her stepdaughter. Glen talks with Cliff and his attitude annoys Lateshia. This causes her to chew him out in public.
70	7	"Baby Rumor Got Back"	March 27, 2026
Selena digs into a suspicious one about Mike. Tambra is surprised by the source of her rumor. Gossip about Lateshia changes the focus of her talk show.
71	8	"Let Me Re-Reintroduce Myself"	April 3, 2026
Tambra throws an event as she squashes a rumor about her and a client. Glen admits to wanting to manage Lateshia's career while Marie bonds over basketball with her son.
72	9	"A Cliff Hanger"	April 10, 2026
Latrice isn't happy with Cliff trying to lighten her workload as the Pearsons and the Rogers go on a double date. Kerri has to make a decision about her restaurant. Latrice has an opportunity to meet up with Stormi.
73	10	"Shante, Sashay Away!"	April 17, 2026
Latrice wants a child but Cliff doesn't. Marie tries to get everyone together but it sparks a shouting match between Tambra and Lateshia's best friend. Lateshia pursues a postnup upsetting Glen.

== Spin-off ==
Due to the popularity, OWN green-lit the first spinoff, titled Belle Collective: Birmingham following Stormi Steele. Among the other ladies on the show are Amber Jones, Tiffaney Jones, Funmi Ford, Synetta Hawkins, and K'La Inman. It is set to premiere April 11, 2026.
