= Quints by Surprise =

Television series

- Also known as: Quintuplet Surprise
- Created by: Jeff Keels; Tom Mireles; Jonathan Nowzaradan
- Directed by: Jeff Keels; Tom Mireles
- Starring: The Jones family
- Composer: David Hamburger
- Country of origin: United States
- Original language: English
- No. of seasons: 3
- No. of episodes: 22

Production
- Executive producers: Jeff Keels; Tom Mireles; Jonathan Nowzaradan; Alon Orstein; Wendy Douglas
- Production locations: Austin, Texas, United States
- Editors: Louisiana Kreutz; Julian Londoño; Ian Prikryl
- Running time: 23 minutes
- Production company: Megalomedia

Original release
- Network: TLC
- Release: August 30, 2010 – November 15, 2011

Related
- Kate Plus 8 Table for 12

Quints by Surprise is a reality television show produced in the United States by Megalomedia about the Jones family, consisting of parents Ethan and Casey and their six children, including quintuplets. The show follows the family through their daily lives, focusing on the challenges of raising multiple children. The show premiered on TLC on August 30, 2010. The family originally appeared in two one-hour specials titled Too Many Babies? and Too Many Babies: How They Do It on Discovery Health, which were later re-aired on TLC under the names Quintuplet Surprise and Quintuplet Surprise: The First 16 Months. The third season premiered on November 8, 2011.

== Family history ==
Ethan and Casey were childhood sweethearts. They first met at a school dance in seventh grade in Denton, Texas, and married at the age of 23 at Grace Temple Baptist Church in Denton, on June 19, 1999. Ethan owns the remodelling company Eliot J Construction and attended an Executive MBA program by Baylor University, graduating in May 2010. Since 2005, the couple has lived in the Steiner Ranch community of Texas. Their desire to start a family was impeded by infertility. It was discovered Ethan suffered an extremely low sperm count. They turned to fertility treatments, using a sperm donor along with intrauterine insemination (IUI). Their first daughter, Eliot McKenna, was born on July 14, 2004.

A different sperm donor was used when the couple decided to conceive a younger sibling for Eliot. Casey underwent IUI for the second time in July 2008. In August 2008, they discovered they were expecting higher order multiples (originally six fetuses were present; one failed to develop). The couple refused selective reduction. The quintuplets were born on January 16, 2009, at Seton Medical Center in Austin: Brooklyn Faith, Britton Grace, Jack William, Lila Addison and Ryan Elizabeth. Over 25 physicians, nurses, and technicians were present for the birth.

== Family ==
Parents

- Ethan Eliot Jones – born February 21, 1976 (age 48)
- Casey Ann Jones (née Krueger) – born September 18, 1975 (age 49)
- Anniversary: June 19, 1999

Children

#	Names	Date of birth
1	Eliot McKenna	July 14, 2004 (age 22)
2	Brooklyn Faith	January 16, 2009 (age 17)
3	Britton Grace	January 16, 2009 (age 17)
4	Jack William	January 16, 2009 (age 17)
5	Lila Addison	January 16, 2009 (age 17)
6	Ryan Elizabeth	January 16, 2009 (age 17)

== Production ==
Filming on the first season occurred in late Spring and Summer 2010. The family filmed on average three to four days per week. Season 2 was filmed during December 2010 and January 2011, and included the quintuplets' second birthday. The third season filmed through October 2011, and premiered on November 8. It consists of 6 episodes.

== Episodes ==
Season	Episodes	Originally released	
Season	Episodes	First released	Last released
Specials	4	March 16, 2010	May 18, 2014
1	10	August 30, 2010	November 8, 2010
2	6	May 9, 2011	June 13, 2011
3	6	June 20, 2011	November 15, 2011

=== Specials ===
No.	Title	Original release date
S–01	"Quintuplet Surprise"	March 16, 2010
Meet Casey and Ethan Jones, already parents to four-year-old Eliot, who decide to try for just one more baby. Instead, they're shocked to find themselves expecting quintuplets.
S–02	"Quintuplet Surprise: The First 16 Months"	September 13, 2010
A behind the scenes look at the Jones quintuplets’ first year with never-before-seen footage, and an update on what's new as the babies grow older.
S–03	"Quints By Surprise: Turning 2"	April 18, 2011
Casey and Ethan Jones celebrate their quintuplets' second birthday with a snow themed party, but will rain ruin their plans? Meanwhile, guests are encouraged to donate to Coats for Kids instead of bringing gifts.
S–04	"Quints By Surprise: The 5 Turn 5"	May 18, 2014

=== Season 1 ===
No. overall	No. in season	Title	Original release date
1	1	"Meet the Joneses"	August 30, 2010
Struggling with the cost of a sudden family of eight, the Joneses decide to put their house on the market.
2	2	"No Time to Play"	September 6, 2010
The whole family attends Ethan's graduation ceremony as he completes his MBA at Baylor University.
3	3	"Family First"	September 13, 2010
The Jones family make a trip to Iowa so the quintuplets can meet their great-grandparents for the first time.
4	4	"Flying Solo"	September 20, 2010
When Ethan must make a ten-day trip to China, Casey is left to care for all six children by herself.
5	5	"Fireworks and Short Fuses"	October 4, 2010
The Joneses spend Fourth of July at a lake house. Meanwhile, the hunt for a new home continues.
6	6	"Packing and Puppies"	October 11, 2010
The Jones family finally find a new home, but will Ethan grant Eliot's wish for a puppy?
7	7	"Moving Day"	October 18, 2010
The day to move into their new home has arrived, and the Jones family must enlist the help of family and friends.
8	8	"Busting at the Seams"	October 25, 2010
Following the move, Ethan and Casey realize their new home isn't big enough for all their belongings.
9	9	"Picture Perfect"	November 1, 2010
Casey tries to get the perfect shot of her growing family.
10	10	"Summer's End"	November 8, 2010
The family celebrates the end of summer at a water park before Eliot prepares to start first grade.

=== Season 2 ===
No. overall	No. in season	Title	Original release date
11	1	"Mr. Mom"	May 9, 2011
With Casey and Eliot off on a girls only vacation, Ethan must take care of the quintuplets by himself.
12	2	"Camping Out"	May 16, 2011
The Jones family is going camping! Ethan teaches the quintuplets about living in the outdoors, but Casey struggles to keep them safe and clean.
13	3	"First Zoo Visit"	May 23, 2011
The Jones family make a special delivery to a military family. Later, they stop by the Alamo and take the babies on their first trip to the zoo.
14	4	"Quints on the Run"	May 30, 2011
When Casey decides to enter a 5 kilometer race pushing the quintuplets in their stroller, she may have taken on more than she can handle.
15	5	"Dog Daze"	June 6, 2011
When Eliot finally receives her long awaited puppy, the family realize that dogs mean a lot of cleaning up, responsibility, and a few surprises too.
16	6	"A Quints Christmas"	June 13, 2011
The Quints second Christmas has arrived and Ethan goes overboard with the decorations, while Casey celebrates with a few new traditions.

=== Season 3 ===
No. overall	No. in season	Title	Original release date
17	1	"Freedom"	November 8, 2011
Ethan and Casey introduce the quintuplets to "big kid" beds and chairs, but can they deal with the chaos of five loose toddlers at dinner and bedtime?
18	2	"Stop, Drop, and Roll"	November 8, 2011
The Joneses visit a local fire station to learn about fire safety after a wildfire comes close to their neighborhood. At home, Ethan performs a fire drill.
19	3	"Touchdowns and Toddlers"	November 15, 2011
Casey surprises Ethan with a family ticket to a college football game to see his alma mater play, in their first football game together since the quintuplets were born.
20	4	"Bikes and Ballet"	November 15, 2011
The quintuplets tag along to Eliot's activities, from ballet to gymnastics, and end up joining in. Can Casey find one sport that all six kids enjoy?
21	5	"A Day in the Life"	November 22, 2011
Cameras capture an action-packed day in the life of the Jones family, as Casey and Ethan try to keep up with the quints and Eliot from breakfast to bedtime.
22	6	"Halloween"	November 22, 2011
The Jones family decorates the house for a trip to the pumpkin patch. Later, the kids do the quints experience.
