= Alaskan Women Looking for Love =

- Genre: Reality television
- Starring: Tina Kilborn; Jenny Walker; Sabina Clark; Heather Bartlett; Haley Forman; Lacy Squartsoff
- Country of origin: United States
- Original language: English
- No. of seasons: 1
- No. of episodes: 6

Production
- Running time: 21 minutes
- Production company: Jarrett Creative

Original release
- Network: TLC
- Release: October 6 – November 10, 2013

Alaskan Women Looking for Love is an American reality television series that premiered on the TLC cable network, on October 6, 2013. The series focuses on six single women who live and work in Alaska, but travel to Miami, Florida to find love.

== Episodes ==
| No. | Title | Original release date |
|---|---|---|
| 1 | "The Odds Are Good..." | October 6, 2013 |
| 2 | "Hello, Sunshine" | October 13, 2013 |
| 3 | "Make Me Over, Miami" | October 20, 2013 |
| 4 | "Girl Code" | October 27, 2013 |
| 5 | "Should I Stay or Should I Go?" | November 3, 2013 |
| 6 | "No Place Like Home" | November 10, 2013 |
