= Police Women of Dallas =

- Genre: Documentary
- Country of origin: United States
- Original language: English
- No. of seasons: 2
- No. of episodes: 21

Production
- Running time: 40 to 43 minutes
- Production company: RelativityREAL

Original release
- Network: TLC (Season 1); OWN (Season 2)
- Release: October 28, 2010 – February 23, 2014

Related
- Police Women of Cincinnati

Police Women of Dallas is the fourth installment of TLC's Police Women reality documentary series, which follows three police officers and a detective of the Dallas Police Department in Dallas, Texas. Despite not being renewed by TLC, the Oprah Winfrey Network ordered a second season which features three new cast members.

== Cast ==
- Sergeant Tracy Jones
- Senior Corporal Melissa Person (season 1)
- Officer Sara Ramsey (season 1)
- Officer Mia Shagena (season 1)
- Officer Beth Burnside (season 1)
- Senior Corporal Cheryl Matthews (season 2)
- Detective Angela Nordyke (season 2)
- Officer Yvette Gonzales (season 2)

== Episodes ==
=== Series overview ===
Season	Episodes	Originally released	
Season	Episodes	First released	Last released
1	8	October 28, 2010	January 13, 2011
2	13	October 13, 2013	February 23, 2014

=== Season 1 (2010–11) ===
No. overall	No. in season	Title	Original release date	U.S. viewers (millions)
1	1	"Don't Make Me Tase You"	October 28, 2010	1.44
2	2	"I'm Putting Everybody in Cuffs"	November 4, 2010	1.75
3	3	"Kick Me Again, See What Happens"	November 11, 2010	1.32
4	4	"He Bleedin'"	December 2, 2010	1.41
5	5	"A Fool for Love"	December 9, 2010	1.27
6	6	"This Ain't Pretty Woman"	December 16, 2010	1.20
7	7	"Pull Up Your Pants"	January 6, 2011	1.63
8	8	"You're Killing Me Dude"	January 13, 2011	N/A

=== Season 2 (2013–14) ===
No. overall	No. in season	Title	Original release date	U.S. viewers (millions)
9	1	"Somebody Just Got Stabbed"	October 13, 2013	N/A
10	2	"Let's Go Fight Crime"	October 20, 2013	N/A
11	3	"She's Got Warrants"	October 27, 2013	N/A
12	4	"Hooks and Crooks"	November 3, 2013	N/A
13	5	"He Hit Me First!"	November 10, 2013	N/A
14	6	"A Pretty Good Little Fight"	November 17, 2013	N/A
15	7	"A Good Situation to Get Shot"	November 24, 2013	N/A
16	8	"Any Sudden Movements, You'll Be Shot"	January 12, 2014	N/A
17	9	"He Just Started Shooting"	January 19, 2014	N/A
18	10	"There's Blood Everywhere"	January 26, 2014	N/A
19	11	"So...You Ready to Die?"	February 2, 2014	N/A
20	12	"She's Unleashed"	February 9, 2014	N/A
21	13	"This Could Be Dangerous"	February 23, 2014	N/A
