= Golden Sisters =

- Genre: Documentary
- Starring: Mary Bartnicki; Josie Cavaluzzi; Teresa Dahlquist
- Country of origin: United States
- Original language: English
- No. of seasons: 1
- No. of episodes: 10

Production
- Executive producers: Eric Schotz; Paul Harrison
- Running time: 21 to 23 minutes
- Production company: LMNO Productions

Original release
- Network: Oprah Winfrey Network
- Release: December 16, 2012 – December 27, 2013

Golden Sisters is an American reality documentary television series on the Oprah Winfrey Network that debuted on June 1, 2013, at 10/9c.

== Premise ==
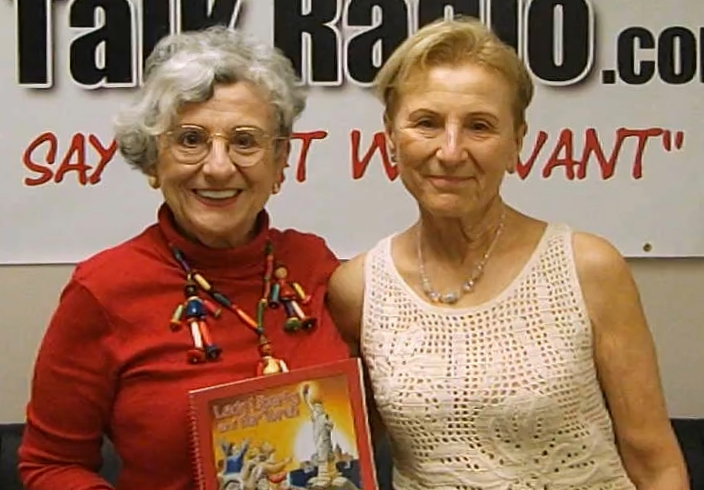
Teresa Dahlquist (left) and Josie Cavaluzzi in 2016

The series chronicles the lives of three sisters, Mary Bartnicki (age 83), Josie Cavaluzzi (age 73) & Teresa Dahlquist (age 73). The trio became an overnight sensation after their video of them watching and commenting on the Kim Kardashian sex tape went viral. The managing of Josie's salon, giving advice to their fan base and giving their opinions on pop culture are also shown.

== Episodes ==
No.	Title	Original release date	U.S. viewers (millions)
-	"Online Dating"	December 16, 2012	0.34
-	"Apocalypse"	December 16, 2012	0.24
1	"Josie's Salon"	June 1, 2013	0.38
Josie's salon, Michelangelo Hair House, is starting to show its age. Her sisters assist her in creating new ways to bring in younger clients starting with shooting a commercial.
2	"Mary Cheats on Jack"	June 1, 2013	0.29
Mary discovers that one of her admired singers, Engelbert Humperdinck, is performing at a nearby casino. Mary and her sisters prepare for a night out on the town to see him perform. Prior to the outing, the trio choose to receive makeovers. While at the concert, Mary jumps on stage due to her overwhelming excitement.
3	"#winetasting"	June 8, 2013	0.39
Oprah meets with the sisters for the first time ever. Later, they discuss their past memories with some Rucola bread and a trip the wine country.
4	"What Happens in Vegas..."	June 12, 2013	0.58
The sisters head out to Las Vegas. Mary is set to compete in a poker tournament at the Palazzo Hotel while her sisters go out for a day of food, fun and tons of gambling. Teresa tries the Master Cleanse diet prior to the trip but the diet doesn't turn out the way she plans. No trip to Las Vegas is complete without some rule breaking.
5	"Teresa's Agency"	June 12, 2013	0.45
Teresa is asked "What is the biggest risk you've ever taken?". Her answer was when she purchased a talent agency, which she had no background in and its pilot season, that means it is time to discover new talent. Teresa's assistant has called in sick and she asks her sisters for help in the office.
6	"No Gut, No Glory"	June 19, 2013	0.41
Teresa is determine to get in shape and eat healthy with the help of celebrity hypnotherapist Michele Guzy, The Mind Coach.
7	"Pony Up!"	June 29, 2013	0.25
8	"Junk in the Trunk"	July 6, 2013	0.25
9	"Driving Miss Mary"	July 13, 2013	0.21
10	"OMG NYC!"	July 13, 2013	0.18
-	"Golden Sisters 2013 Countdown: Best Pop Culture Moments"	December 27, 2013	N/A
