= Little Chocolatiers =

American reality television series

- Starring: Steve Hatch; Katie Masterson
- Country of origin: United States
- Original language: English
- No. of seasons: 1
- No. of episodes: 12

Production
- Production location: Salt Lake City, Utah
- Running time: 22 minutes
- Production company: Relativity Media

Original release
- Network: TLC
- Release: December 21, 2009 – August 6, 2010

Related
- Cake Boss

Little Chocolatiers is an American reality television series that aired on TLC. The show is based on Steve Hatch and his wife Katie Masterson's chocolate shop and how they make their chocolate. Each episode showed their orders in-the-making. TLC premiered the show with an hour-long special on December 21, 2009. The regular series debuted on January 31, 2010. The show was put on hold indefinitely in May 2010.

== Episodes ==
=== Specials (2009) ===
No.	Title	Original release date
Special	"Pilot"	December 21, 2009
In the one-hour special, husband & wife team Steve and Katie not only need to produce 600 chocolate dice for a casino night party -- they're asked to build a life-sized, all chocolate flower garden for a couple's fifth anniversary, but wonder how to complete a project that's bigger than they are. Then disaster is imminent when the air conditioner in their shop goes down... can they save the chocolate? Meanwhile, Steve must overcome his fear of public speaking.

=== Season 1 (2010) ===
No.	Title	Original release date
1	"For Whom the Chocolate Flows"	January 31, 2010
Can the Hatches produce a game of Russian roulette using chocolate covered chili peppers? How will the duo finish a chocolate replica of a log cabin with a flowing river and forest of snow-capped fir trees, and beach pebble stone-all made of chocolate?
2	"The Color of Chocolate"	January 31, 2010
Can the Hatches complete a life-sized pool table made entirely of chocolate? Will Katie find new ways to market their chocolate with a reconnaissance mission to the newest chocolate spa in town?
3	"Mr. Chocolate's Opus"	March 30, 2010
Can the Hatches build a life-sized chocolate desk complete with books, pencils, papers and photos, all of which are made of chocolate? They also work with an outside company to create some new combinations with chocolate and beer.
4	"Say Anything Chocolate"	March 30, 2010
A photographer invites Katie and Steve to stand in a flood of rain, which is made of chocolate. Also, they create a giant chocolate boom box for a couple's celebration of love.
5	"Busting Chocolate"	April 6, 2010
Steve and Katie try to change a boss' image by making a giant chocolate bust of him for his employees to devour and Steve also works on a new management style.
6	"Bowling for Chocolate"	April 6, 2010
Steven and Katie are hired by a female bowling league to create a 16 foot chocolate bowling alley with life-sized pins and balls; Steve visits a local radio show that requires Katie to make a chocolate version of the shows mascot, which is a lunging weasel.
7	"Chocolate of the Sea"	April 13, 2010
Steve and Katie create a 6 foot undersea landscape, which is made entirely out of chocolate. The Hatches also host an all-chocolate baby shower for six pregnant women who are due very soon.
8	"Chocolate on Fire"	April 20, 2010
Steve and Katie create a life-sized fireplace for a family reunion. Also, Katie gets an order for a special basket of chocolate fruit.
9	"Pirates of the Chocolean"	April 27, 2010
Steve adopts a bad pirate accent while working with Katie on making a giant chocolate treasure chest full of booty for a children's book club.
10	"Checkmate Chocolate"	May 4, 2010
A chess champion hires Katie and Steve to make a giant chessboard with 3-foot pieces; the couple use more than 1,000 pounds of chocolate while attempting their biggest project ever.
11	"The Devil Wears Chocolate"	August 6, 2010
The Hatches are hired by a shoe designer to make 30 different high-heeled shoes out of chocolate; The couple visit the Utah Capitol to deliver a 100-pound chocolate beehive modeled after the state emblem.
12	"Little Chocolatiers/Big Dollhouse"	August 6, 2010
The Hatches receive an order from a mother who wants a completely edible chocolate dollhouse full of furniture that stands 3 feet high and 6 feet long; Katie creates a chocolate painting of a child in a swimsuit; Steve struggles to come up with a chocolate catchphrase.
