= King of the Crown =

- Starring: Cyrus Frakes; Shane Arrington; Kyle Taylor; Amanda Helen Pennekamp
- Country of origin: United States
- Original language: English
- No. of seasons: 1
- No. of episodes: 8

Production
- Executive producers: Amber Mazzola; Rachel Tung
- Production location: South Carolina, United States
- Editors: Noelle DeBruhl; Matt Wafaie; Sam Mussari; Sergio Villa; Sax Eno; Anne-Marie Hess; Bill Yoelin
- Running time: 23 minutes

Original release
- Network: TLC
- Release: September 30 – November 6, 2009

Related
- Toddlers & Tiaras

King of the Crown is an American reality television series that debuted on TLC in 2009. The series follows the life of pageant coach Cyrus Frakes and his assistants of Gowns and Crowns as they prepare beauty pageant contestants to compete. The premiere episode, King of the Crown, aired on September 30, 2009. Variety reported an initial order of 12 episodes on August 30, 2009, despite only 8 episodes airing.

== Cast ==
The members of the cast appear as themselves.

- Cyrus Frakes, a Pageant Coach
- Shane Arrington, a Personal Assistant/Interview Coach
- Kyle Taylor, a Booking Agent
- Amanda Helen Pennekamp, an Instructor/Beauty Coach

== Episodes ==
| No. | Title | Original release date |
|---|---|---|
| 1 | "King of the Crown" | September 30, 2009 |
Cyrus and his assistants at Gowns and Crowns try to help Caitlin overcome her fear of public speaking and get Kaleigh shaped up in time to compete.
| 2 | "The Southern Belle vs. The Bombshell" | October 7, 2009 |
Cyrus has two contestants, Mae Anne and Margaret Ann, competing to be named Peanut Queen.
| 3 | "Once a Beauty Queen, Always a Beauty Queen" | October 7, 2009 |
Cyrus helps Sydney Lifchez to stop living in the shadows of her stepmother, who is a former Miss South Carolina.
| 4 | "He Was Outta Here Faster Than a First Runner Up" | October 14, 2009 |
Cyrus teaches a step-dad all about the duties of being a pageant mom.
| 5 | "Her Hair Weighed 200 Lbs" | October 14, 2009 |
Cyrus selects a random girl from the mall and transforms her to compete in a beauty pageant; Cyrus tries to convince a 19-year-old pageant contestant that getting a tattoo might risk her competitive chances.
| 6 | "I Like Big Crowns and I Cannot Lie" | October 21, 2009 |
Cyrus helps to prepare a new client for competition. Amanda decides to return to competition, but it could tarnish her reputation as a pageant coach if she doesn't do well.
| 7 | "Battle of the Blondes" | November 6, 2009 |
It becomes the ultimate battle of the blondes when Kaleigh Hill and Jordan Dawkins go toe to toe at the national pageant in Myrtle Beach.
| 8 | "The Family That Pageants Together, Stays Together" | November 6, 2009 |
The Fox family went from showing horses to "showing their daughters" in pageants, and Cyrus must get both sisters to focus on winning the crown without killing each other!
