= Table for 12 =

- Genre: Reality television
- Starring: The Hayes family
- Country of origin: United States
- Original language: English
- No. of seasons: 2
- No. of episodes: 26

Production
- Executive producers: Todd C. Stevens; Sheila Sitomer; Rudy Bednar
- Producers: David Lee Felter; Brad Hebert
- Editors: Valentine Sheldon; Jim Meigel
- Running time: 23 minutes
- Production company: Figure 8 Films

Original release
- Network: TLC
- Release: March 23 – December 22, 2009

Table for 12 is an American reality television series featuring the Hayes family, with two sets of twins and a set of sextuplets, who reside in Morganville, New Jersey. The series debuted on TLC in 2009.

== Premise ==
The episodes of Table for 12 look at the Hayes family through events such as preparing to go back to school, birthdays, a road trip and more. The episodes show outings and daily things but with two sets of twins and four year old sextuplets. All of the children were conceived with the help of follicle stimulation.

== Cast ==
The cast consists of parents Eric and Elizabeth "Betty" Hayes (née Figler), and their children Kevin, Kyle, Kieran, Meghan, Tara, Rachel, Ryan, Connor, Rebecca, and EJ Hayes.

On September 10, 2023, Rebecca Hayes died at Bayshore Community Hospital.

== Episodes ==
=== Series overview ===
| Season | Episodes | Originally released | |
| Season | Episodes | First released | Last released |
|---|---|---|---|
| 1 | 13 | March 23, 2009 | May 18, 2009 |
| 2 | 13 | September 22, 2009 | December 22, 2009 |

=== Season 1 (2009) ===
| No. overall | No. in season | Title | Original release date |
|---|---|---|---|
| 1 | 1 | "Betty's Birthday" | March 23, 2009 |
Betty is treated to a day at the spa with Meghan. Meanwhile, back at home, Eric and the other nine children bake a cake and make physical and video birthday cards in celebration of Betty's birthday.
| 2 | 2 | "Aquarium" | March 23, 2009 |
The Hayes take a trip to the aquarium during the kids' week off from school to see tropical fish, sharks, and seals.
| 3 | 3 | "Special Strides" | March 30, 2009 |
Eric and Betty take Rebecca to Special Strides, a horse farm that focuses on children with special needs. The other children come along to support their sister and find out they can have fun there, too.
| 4 | 4 | "Christmas" | March 30, 2009 |
It's Christmas time for the Hayes. Santa Claus visits the sextuplets at a school Christmas celebration, and Betty's plan gift opening proceed in an orderly fashion on Christmas morning is quickly abandoned when things get out of hand.
| 5 | 5 | "Ice Skating" | April 6, 2009 |
Eric and Betty take the kids to a local ice skating rink.
| 6 | 6 | "New Year's Eve" | April 13, 2009 |
On New Year's Eve, the Hayes family goes bowling, where it's Eric, Betty, and the two sets of twins against the sextuplets. Later on, the children try to stay up until midnight.
| 7 | 7 | "Dentist" | April 20, 2009 |
Betty and a local pediatric dentist agree to have all ten kids come in for a checkup and cleaning, filling the dental practice's entire morning schedule.
| 8 | 8 | "Babysitting" | April 27, 2009 |
As an aid to would-be caregivers, Eric, Betty, and the older kids present "The Hayes Family Guide to Babysitting", talking through some of the day-to-day challenges of the family's life at home.
| 9 | 9 | "Snowy Day" | May 4, 2009 |
The Hayes family has a snow day, so they drop Rebecca off at Betty's parents' house and go sledding, tubing, and snowboarding on a nearby hill.
| 10 | 10 | "Kevin and Kyle" | May 11, 2009 |
Newly-minted teenagers Kevin and Kyle hope to earn new freedoms by taking on responsibilities, which include helping out around the house and looking after the sextuplets.
| 11 | 11 | "Honey Do" | May 11, 2009 |
Eric takes the time to make some house repairs, prompting Eric and Betty to give a history and tour of the Hayes' house.
| 12 | 12 | "Road Trip (Part 1)" | May 18, 2009 |
The Hayes family embark on a 420-mile road trip to Canada.
| 13 | 13 | "Road Trip (Part 2)" | May 18, 2009 |
During the days leading up to Easter, the Hayes family visits the Canadian side of Niagara Falls, a butterfly exhibit, and an indoor water park. On Easter Sunday, they attend a local church, and after the kids receive their Easter baskets in the van, they go on an Easter egg hunt in their hotel.

=== Season 2 (2009) ===
| No. overall | No. in season | Title | Original release date |
|---|---|---|---|
| 1 | 14 | "Hit the Deck" | September 22, 2009 |
Eric finishes the deck for Betty's family reunion.
| 2 | 15 | "Ramp It Up" | September 22, 2009 |
Eric finishes the ramp for Betty's dad and Rebecca while Betty keeps the younger kids inside.
| 3 | 16 | "Camp Out" | November 10, 2009 |
The Hayes camp out in the backyard for the night in tents.
| 4 | 17 | "Take a Bow" | November 10, 2009 |
Five of the sextuplets are registered for martial art lessons.
| 5 | 18 | "Summer" | November 17, 2009 |
Five of the sextuplets attend their preschool graduation, and the family holds a barbecue in their backyard.
| 6 | 19 | "Busy Day" | November 17, 2009 |
Eric and most of the kids go to a walkathon fundraiser for Rebecca's school, Betty takes Ryan to the doctor, Kieran has a baseball game, and Betty hosts a Tupperware party.
| 7 | 20 | "Jumping In" | November 24, 2009 |
The Hayes prepare to open their family pool and Betty registers the children for swimming lessons to boost their confidence in the water.
| 8 | 21 | "Brace Yourself" | November 24, 2009 |
Kevin and Kyle need braces on their teeth, but the teenagers have differing opinions about getting them.
| 9 | 22 | "Party Animals" | December 1, 2009 |
For the sextuplets' fifth birthday, the Hayes celebrate with a party at BounceU and a visit to the zoo.
| 10 | 23 | "Meghan's Garden" | December 1, 2009 |
Meghan starts a garden in the backyard, with the help of her dad, while the other kids organize their cleaning and other chores.
| 11 | 24 | "Beach Trip" | December 8, 2009 |
Betty takes the kids to the beach and boardwalk for some time in the surf and sand.
| 12 | 25 | "Hershey" | December 15, 2009 |
The family travels to Pennsylvania for some fun at Hershey's Chocolate World and Hersheypark.
| 13 | 26 | "Back to School" | December 22, 2009 |
The Hayes family shops for school supplies together in order to prepare to go back to school. The sextuplets are starting kindergarten and get to ride the school bus for the first time. Meghan and Kieran start middle school, and Kevin and Kyle are in their last year of middle school.

=== Specials ===
| Title | Original release date |
|---|---|
| "Twins, Twins and Sextuplets" | November 17, 2008 |
The Hayes family is not the typical family; with two sets of twins and a set of sextuplets, their daily routine of six loads of laundry the necessity of a fifteen passenger van as their family car is anything but ordinary.
| "First Ski Trip" | March 23, 2010 |
Eric and Betty take the kids skiing for the first time during a family trip to Camelback Mountain in northeastern Pennsylvania.
| "Hayes Get a Puppy" | July 6, 2010 |
The Hayes family grows again when Eric and Betty promise the kids a puppy. However, the kids must prove they can handle the responsibility by completing a long list of spring-cleaning chores first.
