= Police Women of Maricopa County =

- Genre: Documentary
- Country of origin: United States
- No. of seasons: 1
- No. of episodes: 10

Production
- Running time: 40 to 43 minutes (excluding commercials)

Original release
- Network: TLC
- Release: February 25 – May 5, 2010

Related
- Police Women of Memphis

Police Women of Maricopa County is the second of TLC's Police Women reality documentary series, which follows four female members of the Maricopa County Sheriff's Office in Maricopa County, Arizona.

The series features four women: Detective Deborah Moyer, Detective Lindsey Smith, Deputy Kelly Bocardo and Deputy Amie Duong; and follows the women at their jobs as law enforcement officials and at home with their families.

== Cast ==
- Deputy Amie Duong
- Deputy Kelly Bocardo
- Deputy Lindsey Smith
- Detective Deborah "Deb" Moyer

== Episodes ==
No.	Title	Original release date
1	"Another Day in the Desert"	February 25, 2010
2	"I Did My Job Tonight"	March 4, 2010
3	"Super Mom with a Badge"	March 11, 2010
4	"The Infamous Two Beers"	March 18, 2010
5	"One-Stop Shopping for Crime"	March 25, 2010
6	"You're High as a Kite"	April 1, 2010
7	"Your Hair... Take It Off"	April 8, 2010
8	"That's No Way to Be a Girl"	April 15, 2010
9	"Just Another Day in the Life"	April 22, 2010
10	"Behind Bars"	April 28, 2010
11	"Top 10 Takedowns"	May 5, 2010
