= Staten Island Law =

- Genre: Documentary
- Starring: Elura Nanos; Michele Sileo
- Country of origin: United States
- Original language: English
- No. of seasons: 1
- No. of episodes: 6

Production
- Executive producers: Betsy Schechter; George Plamondon
- Running time: 20–22 minutes
- Production company: Picture Shack Entertainment

Original release
- Network: OWN: Oprah Winfrey Network
- Release: January 12 – October 4, 2013

Staten Island Law is an American reality documentary television series on the Oprah Winfrey Network. The series debuted on January 12, 2013, and follows the lives of two Staten Island housewives who are best friends and both work as mediators. The series was pulled off the broadcasting schedule after four episodes due to low viewership and the last two episodes aired in October 2013.

== Episodes ==
No.	Title	Original release date	U.S. viewers (millions)
1	"Elura & Michele Take Staten Island"	January 12, 2013	0.157
An engaged couple needs help settling their pre-nuptial agreement.
2	"Barber Wars"	January 12, 2013	0.149
The duo settles a case between a barbershop owner and an employee.
3	"The Deposit Debacle"	January 19, 2013	0.199
Michele and Elura settle a case between a landlord and tenant.
4	"Robin vs. Robin"	January 12, 2013	0.187
Elura & Michele help a mother who is threatening to evict her daughter who shows no respect.
5	"Battle of the Bars"	October 4, 2013	N/A
The duo helps two local bar owners settle their dispute about who owns the oldest establishment on Staten Island.
6	"Disturbing the Peace"	October 4, 2013	N/A
A complaint related to noise between a young singer and her elderly neighbor are settled.
