= Police Women of Memphis =

- Genre: Documentary
- Country of origin: United States
- No. of seasons: 1
- No. of episodes: 12

Production
- Running time: 40 to 43 minutes (excluding commercials)

Original release
- Network: TLC
- Release: May 27 – August 5, 2010

Related
- Police Women of Dallas

Police Women of Memphis is the third of TLC's Police Women reality documentary series, which follows four female members of the Memphis Police Department in Memphis, Tennessee.

== Cast ==
- Officer Aubrey Olson - Aubrey is a single mom who put herself through college and is a six-year police veteran. She is always guaranteed to bring a smile along with her when on patrol. However, behind her light-hearted demeanor, there lies an officer who is determined to get the job done and isn't afraid to wield a gun that's as tall as she is.
- Officer Arica Logan - After trying many different jobs, ranging from flight attendant to waitress, Arica decided to become a police officer in her hometown of Memphis. With only 2 years on the force, Arica is a determined high achiever who prides herself on her fairness and excellent aim—she is one of the top guns in her class.
- Officer Joy Jefferson - Joy, who is married and a mother of two, grew up wanting to be a police officer ever since she was a child, even though she grew up in a part of town where most people feared the police. With that tough upbringing never far from her heart, Joy relishes the chance to police her old neighborhood and show the young women in the projects that they too can get out and make something of themselves.
- Officer Virginia Awkward - Virginia is married. She understands the impoverished neighborhood she patrols because she was raised there. Criminals should not be fooled by Virginia's slight stature, vivacious personality and welcoming grin. In the streets, she's aggressive, confident and can handle the worst out there.

== Episodes ==
No.	Title	Original release date
1	"A Southern Belle With a Badge"	May 27, 2010
2	"Whose Hair Is This?"	June 3, 2010
3	"Nothin' but Whitey Tightys"	June 10, 2010
4	"Pills Poppin' Everywhere"	June 17, 2010
5	"As Long As You Love Me"	June 24, 2010
6	"Rock Your Fuscia Hair"	July 1, 2010
7	"Get Your Grill On"	July 8, 2010
8	"You Got a Good Beat"	July 15, 2010
9	"Please Don't Be Dead"	July 22, 2010
10	"That Mace is No Fun"	July 29, 2010
11	"You Know You're in the Hood"	August 5, 2010
12	"Every Dog Has Its Day"	August 5, 2010
