= Police Women of Cincinnati =

- Colleen Deegan, Tia Pearson, Mandy Curfiss and Rose Valentino (from left)
- Genre: Documentary
- Country of origin: United States
- No. of seasons: 1
- No. of episodes: 8

Production
- Running time: 40 to 43 minutes (excluding commercials)

Original release
- Network: TLC
- Release: January 13 – March 3, 2011

Police Women of Cincinnati is the fifth installment of TLC's Police Women reality documentary series, which follows four female members of the Cincinnati Police Department (CPD) in Cincinnati, Ohio.

== Cast ==
- Sergeant Chantia "Tia" Miller - A veteran of both the Iraq War and the Cincinnati Police, Chantia has been recently promoted to the rank of Sergeant; but once off her beat, she spends quality time with her husband Adrian, who is also a cop. In 2019, Chantia was promoted to the rank of Police Lieutenant
- Officer Colleen Deegan - One of the toughest and most-street-wise officers in the CPD and also an Iraq War Veteran, Colleen is one of a few women in the CPD's Central Vice Control Section, working undercover to target dangerous criminals and vice crimes such as drug dealers or prostitution.
- Officer Mandy Curfiss - Cincinnati-native Mandy is an officer who's aggressive, outspoken, and relentless in her career of chasing down criminals. Mandy is a former victims' advocate in the Prosecutor's office.
- Officer Rose Valentino - Rose works her beat during the late shift in the Over-the-Rhine neighborhood. She is a Cincinnati native a single mother with two children. Officer Valentino lost her appeal to be rehired after using racial slurs in 2023.

== Episodes ==
No.	Title	Original release date
1	"Welcome to Cincinnati"	January 13, 2011
2	"I'm Not Your Baby"	January 20, 2011
3	"I'll Light You Up"	January 27, 2011
4	"The Party's Over"	February 3, 2011
5	"I'm Worth More Than Fifteen Bucks"	February 10, 2011
6	"You Go Girl"	February 17, 2011
7	"Good Girl in a Bad World"	February 24, 2011
8	"Aim and Fire"	March 3, 2011

== Controversy ==
Episode 4 of the show, airing on February 3, 2011, appeared to show Curfiss handcuffing and arresting an African American male who refused the officer entry into his home for an unwarranted search. Video footage of this incident taken from the episode was posted on numerous websites, calling for Curfiss's resignation. Two years after the airing of the episode, the present Chief of Police, James Craig, launched an investigation into the incident, which discovered that the scene was staged. All parties had agreed to stage the incident and there was no actual arrest made nor charges filed.
