= List of 2013 American television debuts =

These American television shows premiered in 2013.

| Date | Show | Channel | Source |
|---|---|---|---|
| January 1 | The Sisterhood | TLC | |
| January 1 | Totally T-Boz | TLC | |
| January 1 | Storage Wars: New York | A&E | |
| January 1 | Hardcore Pawn: Chicago | truTV | |
| January 3 | Buckwild | MTV | |
| January 4 | Taste in Translation | Cooking Channel | |
| January 5 | Biggest and Baddest with Niall McCann | Velocity | |
| January 6 | Emeril's Florida | Cooking Channel | |
| January 6 | Making Mr. Right | VH1 | |
| January 7 | Deception | VH1 | |
| January 7 | Black Ink Crew | VH1 | |
| January 7 | Vanderpump Rules | Bravo | |
| January 8 | Africa | Discovery Channel | |
| January 9 | Washington Heights | MTV | |
| January 9 | 60 Minutes Sports | Showtime | |
| January 10 | 1600 Penn | NBC | |
| January 10 | Double Divas | Lifetime | |
| January 10 | The Killer Speaks | A&E | |
| January 11 | Banshee | Cinemax | |
| January 11 | Sofia the First | Disney Channel/Disney Jr. | |
| January 12 | Cyndi Lauper: Still So Unusual | WE tv | |
| January 12 | Staten Island Law | Oprah Winfrey Network | |
| January 14 | The Carrie Diaries | The CW | |
| January 14 | Continuum | Syfy | |
| January 14 | Pete Rose: Hits & Mrs. | TLC | |
| January 14 | Food Factory | Destination America | |
| January 14 | Nirmala's Spice World | Veria Living TV | |
| January 14 | Peggy K's Kitchen Cures | Veria Living TV | |
| January 14 | Shipwreck Men | Discovery Channel | |
| January 15 | Real Husbands of Hollywood | BET | |
| January 15 | Second Generation Wayans | BET | |
| January 15 | Redrum | Investigation Discovery | |
| January 16 | The (206) | KING-TV/Seattle | |
| January 16 | Ghost Mine | Syfy | |
| January 16 | Bobby's Dinner Battle | Food Network | |
| January 16 | Kroll Show | Comedy Central | |
| January 17 | King of the Nerds | TBS | |
| January 17 | Legit | FX | |
| January 17 | Newsreaders | Adult Swim | |
| January 19 | Stuff You Should Know | Science Channel | |
| January 20 | Chasing the Saturdays | E! | |
| January 21 | The Following | Fox | |
| January 22 | The Scapegoat | Ovation | |
| January 22 | The Taste | ABC | |
| January 22 | Wild Deep | Animal Planet | |
| January 22 | Edge of America | Travel Channel | |
| January 23 | Kimora: House of Fab | Style | |
| January 23 | Big Rich Atlanta | Style | |
| January 24 | Incredible Crew | Cartoon Network | |
| January 24 | Swamp Pawn | CMT | |
| January 28 | Built | Style | |
| January 28 | Myth Defying with Dr. Holly | Veria Living TV | |
| January 28 | What Would Julieanna Do? | Veria Living TV | |
| January 29 | Nikki & Sara Live | MTV | |
| January 29 | Starter Wives Confidential | TLC | |
| January 29 | Southie Rules | A&E | |
| January 30 | The Americans | FX | |
| January 31 | Do No Harm | NBC | |
| February 1 | Belle's | TV One | |
| February 1 | House of Cards | Netflix | |
| February 1 | Who the (Bleep)... | Investigation Discovery | |
| February 4 | Monday Mornings | TNT | |
| February 4 | Raising America with Kyra Phillips | HLN | |
| February 7 | Guinness World Records Gone Wild | truTV | |
| February 8 | The Jenny McCarthy Show | VH1 | |
| February 8 | The Job | CBS | |
| February 8 | Something Borrowed, Something New | TLC | |
| February 8 | Alpha Dogs | Nat Geo Wild | |
| February 9 | Old Folks Home | Science Channel | |
| February 10 | Car Lot Rescue | Spike | |
| February 10 | Kings of Crash | Velocity | |
| February 10 | Gypsy Sisters | TLC | |
| February 11 | Bang Goes the Theory | BBC America | |
| February 12 | The Face | Oxygen | |
| February 14 | Immortalized | AMC | |
| February 14 | Freakshow | AMC | |
| February 14 | Zero Hour | ABC | |
| February 14 | Failosophy | MTV | |
| February 14 | DC Cupcakes: County Fair | TLC | |
| February 16 | Wendell & Vinnie | Nickelodeon | |
| February 16 | Blackboard Wars | Oprah Winfrey Network | |
| February 18 | Inside Combat Rescue | National Geographic Channel | |
| February 19 | Cult | The CW | |
| February 19 | The Jeselnik Offensive | Comedy Central | |
| February 19 | Peter Rabbit | Nickelodeon | |
| February 20 | Weed Country | Discovery | |
| February 20 | Pot Cops | Discovery | |
| February 21 | Upload with Shaquille O'Neal | truTV | |
| February 21 | For What It's Worth | VH1 Classic | |
| February 22 | Alien Dawn | Nicktoons | |
| February 22 | Out There | IFC | |
| February 25 | Burning Love | E! | |
| February 26 | Golden Boy | CBS | |
| February 26 | Armed & Ready | Travel Channel | |
| February 26 | Mac Miller and the Most Dope Family | MTV2 | |
| February 26 | Robot Combat League | Syfy | |
| February 27 | Stranded | Syfy | |
| February 27 | Rescue My Renovation | DIY Network | |
| February 28 | The Ben Show | Comedy Central | |
| February 28 | Nathan for You | Comedy Central | |
| March 3 | Red Widow | ABC | |
| March 3 | Vikings | History | |
| March 3 | Welcome to Myrtle Manor | TLC | |
| March 4 | LA Shrinks | Bravo | |
| March 4 | Are You Tougher Than a Boy Scout? | National Geographic Channel | |
| March 5 | Prospectors | Weather Channel | |
| March 5 | Treasure Detectives | CNBC | |
| March 5 | The Car Chasers | CNBC | |
| March 6 | Feed the Beast | Travel Channel | |
| March 7 | L.A. Frock Stars | Smithsonian Channel | |
| March 12 | Family Trade | GSN | |
| March 12 | Dead of Night | Investigation Discovery | |
| March 14 | Funeral Boss | Discovery Fit & Health | |
| March 17 | Playing with Fire | E! | |
| March 17 | Wicked Single | VH1 | |
| March 18 | Bates Motel | A&E | |
| March 18 | Gizmodo: The Gadget Testers | BBC America | |
| March 18 | The Lead with Jake Tapper | CNN | |
| March 19 | Splash | ABC | |
| March 19 | Urban Tarzan | Spike | |
| March 20 | Foodiculous | Travel Channel | |
| March 21 | Forecasting the End | The Weather Channel | |
| March 23 | Monsters vs. Aliens | Nickelodeon | |
| March 24 | Married to Medicine | Bravo | |
| March 24 | Monsters and Mysteries in America | Destination America | |
| March 25 | Loaded | The Weather Channel | |
| March 29 | Lalaloopsy | Nickelodeon | |
| March 30 | Orphan Black | BBC America | |
| March 30 | Rebel Eats | Food Network | |
| March 31 | Bad Samaritans | Netflix | |
| April 1 | The Gossip Game | VH1 | |
| April 1 | (Get to) The Point | CNN | |
| April 3 | How to Live with Your Parents (For the Rest of Your Life) | ABC | |
| April 3 | Forever Young | TV Land | |
| April 3 | Rogue | Audience | |
| April 4 | Hannibal | NBC | |
| April 4 | Casino Confidential | TLC | |
| April 4 | America's Worst Tattoos | TLC | |
| April 6 | Garage Gold | DIY Network | |
| April 6 | Got Zen? | Veria Living TV | |
| April 7 | The Sheards | BET | |
| April 9 | The Kandi Factory | Bravo | |
| April 9 | Ready For Love | NBC | |
| April 9 | Find Me My Man | Oxygen | |
| April 10 | Deep South Paranormal | Syfy | |
| April 11 | The Moment | USA Network | |
| April 12 | Da Vinci's Demons | Starz | |
| April 13 | Life with La Toya | Oprah Winfrey Network | |
| April 13 | Bet on Your Baby | ABC | |
| April 14 | Fashion Queens | Bravo | |
| April 14 | Naked Castaway | Bravo | |
| April 14 | Anthony Bourdain: Parts Unknown | CNN | |
| April 15 | Defiance | Syfy | |
| April 15 | Burger Land | Travel Channel | |
| April 15 | Henry Hugglemonster | Disney Jr. | |
| April 16 | Who Gets the Last Laugh? | TBS | |
| April 16 | Flip or Flop | HGTV | |
| April 17 | Off Pitch | VH1 | |
| April 18 | Your Pretty Face Is Going to Hell | Adult Swim | |
| April 19 | Hemlock Grove | Netflix | |
| April 19 | Blade Brothers | Discovery Channel | |
| April 20 | Raising Whitley | Oprah Winfrey Network | |
| April 21 | Dog and Beth: On the Hunt | CMT | |
| April 21 | Guntucky | CMT | |
| April 21 | I'm Married to a... | VH1 | |
| April 21 | What Would Ryan Lochte Do? | E! | |
| April 21 | Ice Cold Gold | Animal Planet | |
| April 22 | Rectify | Sundance TV | |
| April 22 | Brain Games | National Geographic | |
| April 23 | Ke$ha: My Crazy Beautiful Life | MTV | |
| April 23 | Girl Code | MTV | |
| April 23 | Backyard Oil | Discovery Channel | |
| April 23 | Teen Titans Go! | Cartoon Network | |
| April 25 | Giving You the Business | Food Network | |
| April 25 | Workout from Within with Jeff Halevy | Veria Living TV | |
| April 29 | XOX Betsey Johnson | Style | |
| April 29 | Red White & New | Travel Channel | |
| April 30 | Inside Amy Schumer | Comedy Central | |
| April 30 | Crowd Rules | CNBC | |
| May 1 | Family Tools | ABC | |
| May 1 | The Big Brain Theory | Discovery Channel | |
| May 2 | Karma's A B*tch | Investigation Discovery | |
| May 2 | The Show with Vinny | MTV | |
| May 2 | Zach Stone Is Gonna Be Famous | MTV | |
| May 3 | Maron | IFC | |
| May 5 | The Voice Kids | Telemundo | |
| May 6 | Newlyweds: The First Year | Bravo | |
| May 6 | Pizza Cuz | Cooking Channel | |
| May 6 | Take Me to Your Mother | Nick Jr. | |
| May 7 | I Hate My Yard | DIY Network | |
| May 9 | Monumental Mysteries | Travel Channel | |
| May 9 | Mountain Movers | National Geographic Channel | |
| May 12 | Family Tree | HBO | |
| May 12 | Breaking Amish: Brave New World | TLC | |
| May 12 | Ultimate Survival Alaska | National Geographic Channel | |
| May 19 | Life Below Zero | National Geographic Channel | |
| May 19 | North America | Discovery Channel | |
| May 20 | The Goodwin Games | Fox | |
| May 20 | Motive | ABC | |
| May 20 | Girl, Get Your Mind Right | MTV | |
| May 21 | Bad Girls All-Star Battle | Oxygen | |
| May 23 | Does Someone Have to Go? | Fox | |
| May 23 | Save Me | NBC | |
| May 23 | Showville | AMC | |
| May 25 | Sanjay and Craig | Nickelodeon | |
| May 26 | Rock My RV | Travel Channel | |
| May 26 | Avengers Assemble | Disney XD | |
| May 28 | Never Do This at Home | Spike | |
| May 28 | Family S.O.S. with Jo Frost | TLC | |
| May 28 | Brooklyn DA | CBS | |
| May 29 | The American Baking Competition | CBS | |
| May 29 | The Haves and the Have Nots | Oprah Winfrey Network | |
| May 29 | Love Thy Neighbor | Oprah Winfrey Network | |
| May 29 | Dancing Fools | ABC Family | |
| May 30 | Renovation Raiders | HGTV | |
| May 31 | Treehouse Masters | Animal Planet | |
| May 31 | Marriage Boot Camp: Bridezillas | WE tv | |
| June 1 | Pregnant & Dating | WE tv | |
| June 1 | Staged to Perfection | HGTV | |
| June 2 | Princesses: Long Island | Bravo | |
| June 2 | The Wanted Life | E! | |
| June 2 | Top Hooker | Animal Planet | |
| June 3 | Mistresses | ABC | |
| June 3 | The Fosters | ABC Family | |
| June 4 | Exit | Syfy | |
| June 4 | Pretty Wicked Moms | Lifetime | |
| June 5 | The Good Buy Girls | TLC | |
| June 5 | Beverly Hills Pawn | ReelzChannel | |
| June 6 | Race To The Scene | ReelzChannel | |
| June 6 | The Hero | TNT | |
| June 6 | 72 Hours | TNT | |
| June 6 | Graceland | USA Network | |
| June 8 | Sinbad | Syfy | |
| June 8 | Primeval: New World | Syfy | |
| June 8 | Sam & Cat | Nickelodeon | |
| June 8 | Disrupt with Karen Finney | MSNBC | |
| June 9 | Stroumboulopoulos | CNN | |
| June 10 | New Day | CNN | |
| June 10 | King & Maxwell | TNT | |
| June 10 | Deon Cole's Black Box | TBS | |
| June 10 | Grojband | Cartoon Network | |
| June 10 | Street Outlaws | Discovery Channel | |
| June 10 | The Winner Is | NBC | |
| June 11 | Twisted | ABC Family | |
| June 11 | Renovate to Rent | HGTV | |
| June 11 | My Teen is Pregnant and So Am I | TLC | |
| June 12 | Dig Wars | Travel Channel | |
| June 12 | Over the Hump | Veria Living TV | |
| June 13 | House of Curves | WE tv | |
| June 18 | Blood And Oil | Discovery Channel | |
| June 19 | Fight Master: Bellator MMA | Spike | |
| June 19 | The Soup Investigates | E! | |
| June 23 | Whodunnit? | ABC | |
| June 23 | Devious Maids | Lifetime | |
| June 23 | Crossing Lines | NBC | |
| June 23 | Naked and Afraid | Discovery Channel | |
| June 23 | Crimes of the Century | CNN | |
| June 23 | Morgan Spurlock Inside Man | CNN | |
| June 24 | Under the Dome | CBS | |
| June 30 | Ray Donovan | Showtime | |
| July 1 | Below Deck | Bravo | |
| July 1 | Siberia | NBC | |
| July 1 | AwesomenessTV | Nickelodeon | |
| July 5 | Warlocks Rising | Discovery Channel | |
| July 5 | Philly Throttle | Discovery Channel | |
| July 7 | Bikinis & Boardwalks | Travel Channel | |
| July 7 | Food Court Wars | Food Network | |
| July 8 | Get Out Alive with Bear Grylls | NBC | |
| July 8 | Kentucky Bidders | truTV | |
| July 8 | God, Guns & Automobiles | History | |
| July 9 | Property Envy | Bravo | |
| July 9 | Drunk History | Comedy Central | |
| July 10 | The Bridge | FX | |
| July 10 | Camp | NBC | |
| July 11 | Hollywood Game Night | NBC | |
| July 11 | Orange Is the New Black | Netflix | |
| July 11 | Summer Camp | USA | |
| July 13 | Beware the Batman | Cartoon Network | |
| July 13 | The Haunted Hathaways | Nickelodeon | |
| July 13 | Bounty Hunters | CMT | |
| July 14 | Hillbillies for Hire | CMT | |
| July 14 | Pop Innovators | E! | |
| July 15 | Kris | First-run syndication | |
| July 15 | The Real | First-run syndication | |
| July 16 | Perfect Score | The CW | |
| July 16 | Killer Contact | Syfy | |
| July 17 | Wedding Island | TLC | |
| July 17 | Deal with It | TBS | |
| July 19 | Miss U Much | VH1 | |
| July 19 | Liv and Maddie | Disney Channel | |
| July 20 | Cedar Cove | Hallmark Channel | |
| July 21 | Brother vs. Brother | HGTV | |
| July 21 | Breaking Amish: LA | TLC | |
| July 22 | Supermarket Superstar | Lifetime | |
| July 23 | Power Broker | HGTV | |
| July 24 | The Vineyard | ABC Family | |
| July 24 | Spell-Mageddon | ABC Family | |
| July 24 | Joe Rogan Questions Everything | Syfy | |
| July 25 | Glam & God | WE tv | |
| July 26 | Would You Fall for That | ABC | |
| July 27 | Axe Cop | Fox | |
| July 27 | High School USA! | Fox | |
| July 28 | Total Divas | E! | |
| July 29 | The Writers' Room | Sundance TV | |
| July 30 | The Profit | CNBC | |
| July 30 | Capture | The CW | |
| July 31 | The Hunt | The CW | |
| July 31 | Best Daym Takeout | Travel Channel | |
| July 31 | Shark Hunters | NBCSN | |
| August 1 | Hatfields & McCoys: White Lighting | History | |
| August 1 | Please Like Me | Pivot | |
| August 1 | TakePart Live | Pivot | |
| August 2 | Saint Hoods | Discovery Channel | |
| August 3 | In the Flesh | BBC America | |
| August 3 | Rabbids Invasion | Nickelodeon | |
| August 4 | RIDE-iculous | Travel Channel | |
| August 5 | The Shed | Food Network | |
| August 6 | The Legend of Shelby the Swamp Man | History | |
| August 7 | Broadchurch | BBC America | |
| August 11 | Hulk and the Agents of S.M.A.S.H. | Disney XD | |
| August 11 | Eat, Drink, Love | Bravo | |
| August 11 | Low Winter Sun | AMC | |
| August 11 | Talking Bad | AMC | |
| August 11 | Bad Ink | A&E | |
| August 11 | Cutthroat Kitchen | Food Network | |
| August 12 | Naturally Beautiful | Veria Living TV | |
| August 12 | Legal View with Ashleigh Banfield | CNN | |
| August 13 | Cash Dome | truTV | |
| August 13 | Heroes of Cosplay | Syfy | |
| August 13 | Porter Ridge | Discovery Channel | |
| August 13 | Tickle | Discovery Channel | |
| August 13 | Doomsday Castle | National Geographic Channel | |
| August 14 | Let It Ride | National Geographic Channel | |
| August 15 | Owner's Manual | AMC | |
| August 16 | Wander Over Yonder | Disney Channel | |
| August 19 | Crowd Goes Wild | Fox Sports 1 | |
| August 21 | Modern Dads | A&E | |
| August 24 | Beat Bobby Flay | Food Network | |
| August 26 | Olbermann | ESPN2 | |
| September 2 | Uncle Grandpa | Cartoon Network | |
| September 3 | My Big Fat Revenge | Oxygen | |
| September 3 | We're the Fugawis | History | |
| September 4 | Digfellas | Travel Channel | |
| September 6 | Hello Ross | E! | |
| September 8 | Media Buzz | Fox News Channel | |
| September 9 | The Million Second Quiz | NBC | |
| September 9 | The Test | First-run syndication | |
| September 9 | Supreme Justice With Judge Karen | First-run syndication | |
| September 9 | OK!TV | First-run syndication | |
| September 11 | Thieves Inc. | Food Network | |
| September 11 | Too Young To Marry? | Oxygen | |
| September 15 | The Great Santini Brothers | History Channel | |
| September 16 | The Lisa Oz Show | Veria Living TV | |
| September 16 | Sleepy Hollow | Fox | |
| September 17 | Dads | Fox | |
| September 17 | Brooklyn Nine-Nine | Fox | |
| September 17 | The New Atlanta | Bravo | |
| September 17 | I Dream of NeNe: The Wedding | Bravo | |
| September 21 | BollyBlast | Veria Living TV | |
| September 23 | Mom | CBS | |
| September 23 | Hostages | CBS | |
| September 23 | The Blacklist | NBC | |
| September 23 | Paternity Court | First-run syndication | |
| September 24 | Fangasm | Syfy | |
| September 24 | Who Wore It Better | E! | |
| September 24 | Marvel’s Agents of S.H.I.E.L.D. | ABC | |
| September 24 | The Goldbergs | ABC | |
| September 24 | Trophy Wife | ABC | |
| September 24 | Lucky 7 | ABC | |
| September 25 | Back in the Game | ABC | |
| September 26 | The Crazy Ones | CBS | |
| September 26 | The Michael J. Fox Show | NBC | |
| September 27 | MasterChef Junior | Fox | |
| September 29 | Masters of Sex | Showtime | |
| September 29 | Betrayal | ABC | |
| September 29 | Instant Mom | Nick at Nite | |
| September 30 | The Real Story with Gretchen Carlson | Fox News Channel | |
| September 30 | We Are Men | CBS | |
| October 1 | Dukes Of Haggle | Discovery Channel | |
| October 2 | Super Fun Night | ABC | |
| October 2 | Ironside | NBC | |
| October 2 | Big Freedia: Queen of Bounce | Fuse TV | |
| October 3 | Welcome to the Family | NBC | |
| October 3 | Sean Saves the World | NBC | |
| October 3 | The Millers | CBS | |
| October 3 | Man, Cheetah, Wild | Discovery Channel | |
| October 3 | The Originals | The CW | |
| October 3 | Society X with Laura Ling | E! | |
| October 4 | Cassadee Pope: Frame by Frame | CMT | |
| October 6 | Witches of East End | Lifetime | |
| October 6 | Alaskan Women Looking for Love | TLC | |
| October 6 | T.D. Jakes Presents: Mind, Body & Soul | BET | |
| October 7 | Mighty Med | Disney XD | |
| October 7 | Peg + Cat | PBS Kids | |
| October 9 | The Tomorrow People | The CW | |
| October 9 | Big Tips Texas | MTV | |
| October 9 | Full Circle | Audience Network | |
| October 10 | Once Upon a Time in Wonderland | ABC | |
| October 11 | Up Late with Alec Baldwin | MSNBC | |
| October 12 | Veria Living Top Ten | Veria Living TV | |
| October 12 | Sabrina: Secrets of a Teenage Witch | The Hub | |
| October 14 | The Thundermans | Nickelodeon | |
| October 15 | Criss Angel: BeLIEve | Spike | |
| October 16 | Gem Hunt | Travel Channel | |
| October 17 | Reign | The CW | |
| October 18 | The Birthday Boys | IFC | |
| October 20 | Guy's Grocery Games | Food Network | |
| October 21 | Bar Hunters | Discovery Channel | |
| October 22 | Ravenswood | ABC Family | |
| October 22 | Chasing Nashville | Lifetime | |
| October 22 | Trust Me, I'm a Game Show Host | TBS | |
| October 23 | Best Funeral Ever | TLC | |
| October 24 | Million Dollar Shoppers | Lifetime | |
| October 24 | Scrubbing In | MTV | |
| October 24 | Restaurant Divided | Food Network | |
| October 25 | Dracula | NBC | |
| October 25 | Styled to Rock | Bravo | |
| October 26 | Spooksville | The Hub | |
| October 27 | The Governor's Wife | A&E | |
| October 27 | Hiring Squad | Spike | |
| October 28 | The Pete Holmes Show | TBS | |
| October 29 | Naked Vegas | Syfy | |
| November 3 | It Takes A Choir | USA | |
| November 3 | Restaurant Express | Food Network | |
| November 4 | Steven Universe | Cartoon Network | |
| November 6 | Mother Up! | Hulu | |
| November 8 | The Lylas | WE tv | |
| November 10 | Thicker than Water | Bravo | |
| November 10 | American Jungle | History | |
| November 14 | Ground Floor | TBS | |
| November 17 | Almost Human | Fox | |
| November 17 | On the Rocks | Food Network | |
| November 23 | Lucas Bros. Moving Co. | Fox | |
| November 23 | Golan the Insatiable | Fox | |
| November 24 | Getting On | HBO | |
| November 24 | Ja'mie: Private School Girl | HBO | |
| November 24 | Breaking the Faith | TLC | |
| November 25 | Generation Cryo | MTV | |
| December 2 | Bakery Boss | TLC | |
| December 2 | Rick and Morty | Adult Swim | |
| December 4 | Kirstie | TV Land | |
| December 4 | Mob City | TNT | |
| December 5 | Panic Button | truTV | |
| December 5 | Courtney Loves Dallas | Bravo | |
| December 8 | Dude, You're Screwed | Discovery Channel | |
| December 15 | Rodeo Girls | A&E | |
| December 24 | Turbo Fast | Netflix | |

== See also ==
- 2013 in the United States
- List of American films of 2013
