= List of programs broadcast by Paramount Network =

The following is a list of programs that have aired on Paramount Network, an American pay television channel owned by the Paramount Media Networks division of Skydance Corporation.

== Current programming ==
=== Unscripted ===
==== Reality ====
| Title | Genre | Premiere | Seasons | Length | Status |
|---|---|---|---|---|---|
| Bar Rescue (seasons 6–10) | Reality | March 11, 2018 (Note: Seasons 1–5 aired on Spike.) | 5 seasons, 152 episodes | 41–42 min | Pending |

==== Variety ====
| Title | Genre | Premiere | Seasons | Length | Status |
|---|---|---|---|---|---|
| American Mayhem | Clip show | November 13, 2026 | 1 season, 13 episodes | 22 min | Season 1 ongoing |

== Former programming ==
=== Scripted ===
| Title | Genre | Premiere | Finale | Seasons | Length |
|---|---|---|---|---|---|
| Waco | Drama | January 24, 2018 | February 28, 2018 | 6 episodes | 48–53 min |
| Nobodies | Comedy | March 29, 2018 | May 31, 2018 | 1 season, 3 episodes (Note: Nobodies aired season 1 and 12 episodes on TV Land. After airing three episodes of season 2, Paramount Network pulled the series and moved it back to TV Land.) | 22–23 min |
| American Woman | Comedy | June 7, 2018 | August 23, 2018 | 1 season, 11 episodes | 19–26 min |
| Yellowstone | Neo-Western drama | June 20, 2018 | December 15, 2024 | 5 seasons, 53 episodes | 37–92 min |
| Heathers | Dark comedy | October 25, 2018 | October 29, 2018 | 1 season, 9 episodes (Note: In the United States, Heathers was edited for content by the network, resulting in the number of episodes being reduced from ten to nine. The show previously aired in selected territories in Europe in its original ten-episode format.) | 32–42 min |
| 68 Whiskey | Comedy drama | January 15, 2020 | March 18, 2020 | 1 season, 10 episodes | 38–47 min |

=== Unscripted ===
==== Docuseries ====
| Title | Subject | Premiere | Finale | Seasons | Length |
|---|---|---|---|---|---|
| It Was Him: The Many Murders of Ed Edwards | True crime | April 16, 2018 | May 21, 2018 | 6 episodes | 40–43 min |
| Rest in Power: The Trayvon Martin Story | True crime | July 30, 2018 | September 10, 2018 | 6 episodes | 42–43 min |

==== Reality ====
| Title | Genre | Premiere | Finale | Seasons | Length |
|---|---|---|---|---|---|
| Lip Sync Battle (seasons 4–5) (Note: Seasons 1–3 aired on Spike.) | Reality competition | January 18, 2018 | June 27, 2019 | 2 seasons, 30 episodes | 20–23 min |
| Cops (seasons 30b–32) (Note: Seasons 1–30 aired on Fox and Spike.) | Reality | January 22, 2018 | May 11, 2020 | 3 seasons, 77 episodes | 20 min |
| Ink Master (seasons 10–13) (Note: Seasons 1–9 and the first two episodes of season 10 aired on Spike.) | Reality competition | January 23, 2018 | April 14, 2020 | 4 seasons, 61 episodes | 41–42 min |
| Ink Master: Angels (season 2) (Note: Season 1 aired on Spike.) | Reality competition | March 27, 2018 | May 29, 2018 | 1 season, 10 episodes | 41 min |
| Wife Swap | Reality | April 4, 2019 | April 16, 2020 | 2 season, 20 episodes | 40–42 min |
| Marriage Rescue | Reality | June 2, 2019 | July 7, 2019 | 1 season, 6 episodes | 41–42 min |
| The Last Cowboy | Reality competition | July 24, 2019 | August 28, 2019 | 1 season, 10 episodes | 41 min |
| Ink Master: Grudge Match | Reality competition | October 1, 2019 | December 17, 2019 | 1 season, 12 episodes | 41 min |
| Battle of the Fittest Couples | Reality competition | October 15, 2019 | November 5, 2019 | 1 season, 10 episodes | 40–41 min |

=== Sports ===
| Title | Genre | Premiere | Finale | Seasons | Format / Length |
|---|---|---|---|---|---|
| Bellator MMA (Note: Seasons 1–18 aired on Spike. Moved to CBS Sports Network.) | Mixed martial arts | January 20, 2018 | September 9, 2020 | 2 seasons, TBA episodes | 120 min |

=== Specials ===
- I Am Paul Walker (August 11, 2018)
- I Am Patrick Swayze (August 18, 2019)

== Acquired programming ==
=== Current ===
- The Office (2019–present)
- NCIS (2021–present)
- Mayor of Kingstown (2022–present)
- Entertainment Tonight (2025–present)
- Inside Edition (2025–present)
- Dutton Ranch (2026–present)
- Everybody Loves Raymond (2026–present)

=== Former ===
- Two and a Half Men (2018–25)
- American Ninja Warrior (2018)
- Friends (2018–19)
- M*A*S*H (2018)
- Mom (2018–22)
- Roseanne (2018)
- America's Most Musical Family (2019)
- The King of Queens (2019–20)
- Without a Trace (2020)
- South Park (2022)
- Law & Order (2023–24)

== Programming as Spike ==
=== Drama ===
- Blade: The Series (2006)
- The Kill Point (2007)
- Kung Fu Killer (2008)
- Tut (2015)
- The Shannara Chronicles (2016–2017)
- The Mist (2017)

=== Comedy ===
- Factory (2008)
- MoCap, LLC (2009)
- Super Dave's Spike-Tacular (2009)
- Players (2010)
- Blue Mountain State (2010–2011)

=== Animated ===
- Gary the Rat (2003)
- Ren & Stimpy "Adult Party Cartoon" (2003)
- Stripperella (2003–2004)
- Ride with Funkmaster Flex (2003–2004)
- This Just In! (2004)
- Afro Samurai (2007)

=== Reality/unscripted ===
- Fandango (1983–1989)
- Nashville Now (1983–1993)
- You Can Be A Star (1983–1989)
- Country Kitchen (1985–1994)
- Grand Ole Opry Live (1985)
- Crook & Chase (1986–1999)
- New Country (1986–1988)
- Opry Backstage (1987–2001)
- A Conversation with Dinah (1989–1992)
- Top Card (1989–1993)
- Truckin' USA (1989–1996)
- Club Dance (1991–1999)
- 10 Seconds (1993–1994)
- Music City Tonight (1993–1995)
- Prime Time Country (1996–1999)
- Car and Driver Television (1999–2005)
- Trucks! (2001–2009)
- Hotlines (2003–2004)
- The Joe Schmo Show (2003–2013)
- MXC (2003–2007)
- Ride with Funkmaster Flex (2003–2004)
- Spike Video Game Awards (2003–2013)
- The John Henson Project (2004)
- 10 Things Every Guy Should Experience (2004)
- The Club (2004–2005)
- Hey! Spring of Trivia (2004–2005)
- I Hate My Job (2004–2005)
- Midnight Spike (2004)
- On the Road: A True Rock-n-Roll Road Story (2004)
- Spike Likes Movies (2004)
- True Dads (2004)
- The Ultimate Gamer (2004–2006)
- Carpocalypse (2005–2006)
- Boom! (2005)
- GameTrailers TV with Geoff Keighley (2005–2013)
- The Lance Krall Show (2005)
- The Playbook (2005–2006)
- Super Agent (2005)
- Invasion Iowa (2005)
- Disorderly Conduct: Video on Patrol (2006–2009)
- The Dudesons (2006–2010)
- Fresh Baked Video Games (2006)
- HorsePower TV (2006–2013)
- King of Vegas (2006)
- MuscleCar (2006–2013)
- Pros vs. Joes (2006–2010)
- Raising the Roofs (2006)
- Scream Awards (2006–2011)
- World's Most Amazing Videos (2006–2008)
- Xtreme 4x4 (2006–2013)
- Manswers (2007–2011)
- Bullrun (2007–2010)
- Murder (2007)
- Reality Racing (2007)
- Toughest Cowboy (2007–2009)
- 1000 Ways to Die (2008–2012)
- DEA (2008–2009)
- Real Vice Cops Uncut (2008–2009)
- 4th and Long (2009)
- Deadliest Warrior (2009–2011)
- Jesse James Is a Dead Man (2009)
- Surviving Disaster (2009)
- Auction Hunters (2010–2015)
- Half Pint Brawlers (2010)
- Permanent Mark (2010)
- Scrappers (2010)
- Sports Crash (2010)
- Unique Autosports: Miami (2010)
- Coal (2011)
- Flip Men (2011–2012)
- Jail (2011–2017)
- Phowned! (2011)
- Bar Rescue (2011–2017)
- Repo Games (2011–2012)
- Big Easy Justice (2012)
- All Access (2012–2013)
- Diamond Divers (2012)
- GT Academy (2012–2014)
- Ink Master (2012–2018)
- Rat Bastards (2012)
- Savage Family Diggers (aka American Digger) (2012–2013)
- Tattoo Nightmares (2012–2015)
- Undercover Stings (2012)
- World's Wildest Police Videos (2012)
- World's Worst Tenants (2012–2013)
- #Rampage4Real (2013)
- Car Lot Rescue (2013)
- Criss Angel Believe (2013)
- Fight Master: Bellator MMA (2013)
- Never Ever Do This at Home (2013)
- Cops (2013–2017)
- Tattoo Rescue (2013)
- Urban Tarzan (2013)
- 10 Million Dollar Bigfoot Bounty (2014)
- Catch a Contractor (2014–2015)
- Frankenfood (2014)
- Gym Rescue (2014)
- Hungry Investors (2014)
- Tattoo Nightmares: Miami (2014)
- Thrift Hunters (2014)
- Coaching Bad (2015)
- Framework (2015)
- Lip Sync Battle (2015–2017)
- Sweat Inc. (2015)
- Forensic Justice (2016)
- That Awkward Game Show (2016–2017)
- Ink Master: Angels (2017)

=== Sports ===
- PRCA Rodeo (1986–2002)
- NASCAR on TNN (1991–2000)
- ASA on TNN (1991–2002)
- PBR Bull Riding (1993–2002)
- Motor Madness (TNN) (1997–1998)
- RollerJam (TNN) (1999–2000)
- Champ Car World Series (2004)
- Untold: The Greatest Sports Stories Never Told (2004–2005)
- Maximum MLB (2005)
- NBA Rookies (2005–2012)
- The Ultimate Fighter (2005–2011)
- UFC Countdown (2005–2012)
- UFC Fight Night (2005–2012)
- UFC Unleashed (2005–2007)
- Wild World of Spike (2007)
- MMA Uncensored Live (2012)
- Bellator MMA Live (2013–2017)
- Premier Boxing Champions (2015–2017)

==== Pro wrestling ====
- WWE Confidential (2003–2004)
- WWE Sunday Night HEAT (2003–2005)
- WWE Velocity (2000–2005)
- WWE Experience (2004–2005)
- WWE Raw (2003–2005)
- TNA iMPACT!/Impact Wrestling (2005–2014)
- TNA Epics (2010)
- TNA Reaction (2010)

=== Specials ===
- Spike TV's 52 Favorite Cars (2004)
- AutoRox Awards (2005)
- Metal of Honor: The Ironworkers of 9/11 (2006)
- Until Death (2007)
- Ring of Death (2008)
- S.I.S. (2008)
- Sharpshooter (2008)
- Backwoods (2008)
- Crash and Burn (2008)
- Depth Charge (2008)
- Finish Line (2008)
- Mask of the Ninja (2008)
- Street Warrior (2008)
- Afro Samurai: Resurrection (2009)
- 1000 Ways to Lie (2010)
- U.S. Navy: Pirate Hunters (2010)
- Alternate History: Nazis Win WW2 (2011)
- I Am Bruce Lee (2012)
- Covert Kitchens (2013)
- Hiring Squad (2013)
- I Am Evel Knievel (2014)
- I Am Steve McQueen (2014)
- Ink Shrinks (2014)
- I Am Chris Farley (2015)
- I Am Dale Earnhardt (2015)
- I Am JFK Jr. (2016)
- I Am Heath Ledger (2017)
- I Am Sam Kinison (2017)
- Time: The Kalief Browder Story (2017)

=== Acquired programs ===
- 'Til Death
- The A-Team
- American Start-Up
- Band of Brothers
- Baywatch
- Be a Star
- Beavis and Butt-Head
- Behind the Bar
- Bill Dance Outdoors
- Black Ink Crew
- Blind Date
- Cagney & Lacey
- Campus PD
- Celebrity Outdoors
- Cheers
- CSI: Crime Scene Investigation
- CSI: Miami
- CSI: NY
- Dallas
- Entourage
- The Equalizer
- Friends
- Gangland
- Gangsters: America's Most Evil
- Hee Haw
- Highlander: The Series
- The Hoop Life
- I Bet You Will
- I Dare You: The Ultimate Challenge
- Kevin Spencer
- The King of Queens
- MacGyver
- Married... with Children
- Maximum Exposure
- Miami Vice
- Real TV
- The Ren & Stimpy Show
- Sasuke
- Beyond Scared Straight
- Scrubs
- Seven Days
- The Shield
- Shipmates
- Son of the Beach
- Star Trek: Deep Space Nine
- Star Trek: The Next Generation
- Star Trek: Voyager
- That's Country
- Three's Company
- The Three Stooges
- The Unit
- Unsolved Mysteries
- V.I.P.
- Whacked Out Sports
- When Animals Attack!
- When Good Pets Go Bad
- World's Wildest Police Videos

=== Unaired series ===
In its early days as Spike TV, Spike commissioned an animated series from Klasky Csupo, Immigrants, featuring two Hungarian men who moved to Los Angeles to start a new life. The series was to have debuted on August 14, 2004. Despite scheduling a two-hour marathon of the series on its premiere, it was canceled on August 6, 2004, for unknown reasons. Spike instead aired a two-hour block of Most Extreme Elimination Challenge. The series became the basis of a 2008 film of the same name, which was first released in Hungary in October 2008.

== Programming as TNN/The New TNN ==
=== Original programming ===
- I-40 Paradise (1983–1986)
- 18 Wheels of Justice (2000–2001)
- Fame for 15 (2001)
- Lifegame (2001)
- Pop Across America (2001)
- Robot Wars: Extreme Warriors (2001–2002)
- Small Shots (2001–2003)
- Ultimate Revenge (2001–2003)
- Robot Wars: Grand Champion (2002–2003)
- Oblivious (2002–2004)
- The Conspiracy Zone (2002)
- Taboo (2003)

=== Sports ===
- PRCA ProRodeo (1986–2002)
- NASCAR on TNN (1991–2000)
- ASA on TNN (1991–2002)
- Monster Jam on TNN (1992–2002)
- Professional Bull Riders (1994–2002)
- RollerJam (TNN) (1999–2001)
- AFL on TNN (2000–2003)
- XFL on TNN (2001)
- NCAA Final Four Highlights on TNN (2002–2003)
- Slamball (2002–2003)

==== Pro wrestling ====
- ECW on TNN (1999–2000)
- WWF Superstars (TNN) (2000–2001)
- WWE Raw (2000–2005)
- WWF Excess (TNN) (2001–2002)
- WWE Confidential (2002–2003)
- WWE Heat (2002–2003)
- WWE Velocity (2002–2003)

=== Acquired programming ===
- The Dukes of Hazzard (1996–2001)
- The Waltons (1998–2002)
- Alice (1999–2001)
- The Real McCoys (1999–2001)
- Martial Law (2000–01)
- Starsky & Hutch (2000–01)
- Real TV (2000-2003) (1999-2000 version hosted by Kristen Eykel; 2000-2001 version hosted by Ahmad Rashad)
- Star Trek: The Next Generation (2000-2003)
- The A-Team (2000-2003)
- Baywatch (2001-2003)
- Newhart (2001)
- The Rockford Files (2001)
- Taxi (2001)
- WKRP in Cincinnati (2001)
- The Wonder Years (2001)
- Picket Fences (2001–02)
- Hangin' with Mr. Cooper (2001–03)
- Kids Say the Darndest Things (2001–03)
- MADtv (2001–03)
- Diff'rent Strokes (2002)
- V.I.P. (2002-2003)
- Seven Days (2002-2003)
- Highlander (2002-2003)
- Celebrity Deathmatch (2002)
- American Gladiators (2002–03)
- Blind Date (2003)
- CSI: Crime Scene Investigation (2003)

== See also ==
- List of programs broadcast by Comedy Central
- List of programs broadcast by TV Land
- List of programs broadcast by Nickelodeon
