= Silas Hite =

Background information
- Born: March 30, 1980 (age 46); Prescott, Arizona, US
- Genre: Film score
- Occupations: Composer; multi-instrumentalist; record producer; visual artist
- Instruments: Piano; guitar; bass guitar; drums; percussion; mandolin; accordion; ukulele; organ; synthesizer
- Website: silashite.com

Silas Hite (born March 30, 1980) is an American composer, multi-instrumentalist, songwriter, and record producer. He is known for composing music for films, television series, video games, commercials, and contemporary art installations.

His credits include Chef's Table, The Big Brunch, CNN's My Happy Place, Street Food: Asia, and numerous independent films and documentaries. He has also collaborated with filmmaker John Herschend on projects exhibited at the San Francisco Museum of Modern Art (SFMOMA) and the Whitney Biennial. His work has contributed to several award-winning advertising campaigns, including Burger King's Subservient Chicken and Apple's Get a Mac campaigns, and earned him a Daytime Emmy Award nomination in 2007 for Shaggy & Scooby-Doo Get a Clue!.

== Early life ==
Hite was born on March 30, 1980, in Prescott, Arizona. He is the grandson of General Boy (Robert Mothersbaugh Sr.) and the nephew of musicians Mark Mothersbaugh, Bob Mothersbaugh, and Jim Mothersbaugh, members of the American new wave band Devo. Hite began playing drums when he was eleven, studying with jazz drummer Mel Zelnick. He taught himself guitar and bass and sang in the choir at The Orme School.

Hite attended the University of Arizona, where he earned a Bachelor of Fine Arts (B.F.A.) with studies in music, art, and business.

== Career ==
Hite began his professional career at Mutato Muzika, the music production company founded by his uncle, composer and Devo co-founder Mark Mothersbaugh. Between 2003 and 2010, he worked as an in-house composer, arranger, producer, and session musician, contributing music to feature films, television series, video games, and advertising campaigns.

During this period, he worked on several award-winning commercial campaigns, including Burger King's "Subservient Chicken", which received the Cannes Cyber Gold Lion and Grand Clio Award, and Apple's "Get a Mac" campaign, which earned the Grand Effie Award, Best Spots Campaign of the Year, and was later recognized by Adweek as one of the most influential advertising campaigns of the decade. His television work included additional music for series such as LAX, Eureka, All Grown Up!, Shaggy & Scooby-Doo Get a Clue!, Dance-a-Lot Robot, Mater's Tall Tales, and Blue Mountain State. His contributions to Shaggy & Scooby-Doo Get a Clue! earned a Daytime Emmy Award nomination in 2007 for Outstanding Achievement in Music Direction and Composition.

After leaving Mutato Muzika in 2010, Hite established himself as an independent composer, writing original scores for feature films, documentaries, television productions, museum installations, advertising campaigns, and video games.

Beginning in 2013, Hite collaborated extensively with filmmaker and visual artist Jonn Herschend. Their projects included Scenes From the Evacuation, commissioned by the San Francisco Museum of Modern Art (SFMOMA), and Discussion Questions, presented at the 2014 Whitney Biennial, combining contemporary visual art with original music and sound design.

Hite continued to compose music for high-profile commercial campaigns after becoming an independent composer. In 2014, he contributed music to an Emmy Award-winning public service announcement. He subsequently composed music for REI's #OptOutside campaign, which received the Cannes Titanium Grand Prix in 2016 and was later recognized by Ad Age as one of the Best Campaigns of the Decade in 2020.

In 2018, Hite again collaborated with Herschend for the FRONT International: Cleveland Triennial for Contemporary Art. They created Theme Song for Cleveland and Akron, a song and music video collaboration that was on display at the Rock and Roll Hall of Fame from July through September of 2018. The event culminated with a live performance of the song at the Rock Hall by a band led by Hite.

Hite has composed for numerous television and streaming productions. He developed orchestral scores for Netflix's Chef's Table, composed music for multiple episodes of the BBC documentary series Stacey Dooley Investigates between 2017 and 2019, scored the Cebu, Philippines episode of Netflix's Street Food: Asia, and served as composer for all eight episodes of HBO Max's culinary competition series The Big Brunch, created and hosted by Dan Levy. In 2025, he was the series composer for CNN and Boardwalk Pictures' travel documentary series CNN's My Happy Place, creating the musical identity across all six episodes featuring Alan Cumming, Billy Porter, Octavia Spencer, Simu Liu, Taraji P. Henson, and Questlove.

Alongside his score work, Hite has written, produced, and performed original songs for numerous films and television programs. Besides composing scores, Hite is also a songwriter, producer, and performer, providing original songs for many of his projects. He routinely self-releases solo albums in different genres and his songs have appeared in films such as “Return To Nuke 'Em High” (Troma Pictures), ”Nick & Norah's Infinite Playlist," Robert Williams' "Mr. Bitchin’", “The Perfect Wave,” and "Circle of 8" (Paramount Pictures), and television programs such as Hulk Hogan: Real American (Netflix) Dance-a-Lot Robot (Disney), "Blue Mountain State" (Spike), "Duck Dynasty" (A&E), "Burn Notice" (USA Network), "Extreme Makeover: Home Edition" (ABC), and "UFC Ultimate Insider" (Fox Sports).

Hite has also composed extensively for the video game industry, contributing music to titles including The Sims 4 Get Famous, The Sims 4 City Living, The Sims 2, The Sims 2 Castaway, The Sims 2 Bon Voyage, The Sims 2 University, The Sims 2 Open For Business, My Sims, My Sims Agents, My Sims Racing, My Sims Kingdom, Boom Blox, Boom Blox Bash Party, Skate 3, Academy of Champions, Frogger: Ancient Shadows, The Simpsons, Tom and Jerry Blast (mobile), Tetris (mobile) and The Sims (mobile).

For more than a decade, Silas has created music, sound design, and voice-over work for interactive films and on-line video games known as Google Doodles. His credits include the Google Doodles for Halloween in 2024, 2023, 2020, and 2019; Valentine's Day in 2022 and 2017; Lotería in 2019; the Fourth of July in 2019; Bach's A.I. music experiment in 2019; Gardening Day in 2018; the 2018 Winter Olympics; and Computer Science Education Week in 2017. His contributions have included music, sound design, and voice-over work.

His recent work has continued to receive recognition on the international festival circuit. The short film El Paisa, for which he composed the score, received awards including Best Short Film and Best LGBTQ+ Film at the 2024 Cannes Film Awards for Emerging Filmmakers, further expanding his body of work in independent cinema.

== Personal life ==
In 2023, Hite and his wife left Los Angeles and moved to Bath Township, Ohio. He built a new studio (Bath Time Studios) where he continues to score films, television shows, commercials, and video games. In 2026, Hite was asked to join the Board of the Akron Symphony Orchestra.

== Filmography ==
=== Films ===
- Living Feral (2026)
- The Cheerleader (2026)
- Making Music From Monsters (2026)
- The Floor Remembers (2026) additional music
- Shades of Violet (2026) additional music
- Icon in the Sky: 100 Years of The Goodyear Blimp (2025)
- Cabali and the Tiki Mug Obsession (2026) Main title composer
- Dawn Dusk (2024)
- As You Wish... (2024)
- El Paisa (2023)
- The Most Remote Restaurant in the World (2023)
- Witchcraft Motion Picture Company Presents: Horror Anthology – Volume 1 ("Night Swim" segment) (2022)
- The Space Between Us (2015)
- Saltwater Buddha (2015)
- Discussion Questions (2014) Whitney Biennial
- The Rebel From The Ghetto (Denmark) (2014) additional music
- Smothered (2014)
- Love in the Time of Monsters (2014) (Writer: Silas Hite)
- Forever (2014) additional music
- How To Make A Peanut Butter and Jelly Sandwich (2014) Short
- Scenes From The Evacuation (2013) San Francisco MOMA
- Real Life H-O-R-S-E! With Dave Franco & DeAndre Jordan (2013)
- Robert Williams Mr. Bitchin' (2013) Documentary
- Stoned Debates II: Highlights (2012)
- Stoned Debates II: Subway vs Quiznos (2012)
- Stoned Debates I: Is Marriage an Outdated Institution (2012)
- Stoned Debates I: Highlights (2012)
- The Record Breakers (2012) Documentary
- Ramona and Beezus (2010) additional music
- Hopelessly in June (2011)
- The Invention of Dr. Nakamats (2009) Documentary
- Junkyard (2009)
- Circle of Eight (2009) additional music
- Cloudy with a Chance of Meatballs (2009) additional music
- Nick & Norah's Infinite Playlist (2008) additional music
- Nothing but the Truth (2007) additional music
- First Decent (2005) additional music

=== Television ===
- The Object of the Game - Composer, additional music
- My Happy Place, Season 1, ("Scottish Highlands with Alan Cumming") (2025)
- Street Food (TV series), Episode: Cebu, Philippines (2019)
- Chef's Table (2015)
- Jagten (series Denmark) (2014) additional music
- 7.9.13 (series Denmark) (2014)
- Weed Country (series) (2014) (Writer: Silas Hite)
- Best Week Ever (series) (2013) (Writer: Silas Hite)
- Big Texas Heat (series) (2013) (Writer: Silas Hite)
- Brain Games (series) (2013) (Writer: Silas Hite)
- Car Lot Rescue (series) (2013) (Writer: Silas Hite)
- Gypsy Sisters Extra Bling (series) (2013) (Writer: Silas Hite)
- Lords of War (series) (2013) (Writer: Silas Hite)
- Pawn Stars (series) (2013) (Writer: Silas Hite)
- Bid and Destroy (series) (2012) (Writer: Silas Hite)
- Counting Cars (series) (2012) (Writer: Silas Hite)
- Flipped Off (series) (2012) (Writer: Silas Hite)
- Goldfathers (series) (2012) (Writer: Silas Hite)
- NY Ink (series) (2012) (Writer: Silas Hite)
- Celebrity House Hunting (series) (2012) (Writer: Silas Hite)
- Flipping Out (series) (2011) (Writer: Silas Hite)
- Extreme Makeover Home Edition (series) (2011) (Writer: Silas Hite)
- Outrageous Kid Parties (series) (2011) (Writer: Silas Hite)
- American Restoration (series) (2010)(Writer: Silas Hite)
- Blue Mountain State (series) (2010) additional music
- Bud House (series) (2010) (Writer: Silas Hite)
- Burn Notice (series) (2010) (Writer: Silas Hite)
- Mater's Tall Tales (series) (2010) additional music
- Dance-a-Lot Robot (series) (2010) additional music
- Follow Me: The Search For The First MTV Twitter Jockey (series) (2010) (Writer: Silas Hite)
- Bad Girls Club (series) (2009) (Writer: Silas Hite)
- Sex News and Rock N Roll (series) (2008) (Writer: Silas Hite)
- Shaggy & Scooby-Doo Get a Clue! (series) (2006-2007) additional music
- All Grown Up! (series) (2005–2007) additional music
- Eureka (series) (2006) additional music
- LAX (series) (2004-2005) additional music

=== Video games ===
- Tom and Jerry Blast - mobile (2026)
- Grunt Rush: Battle & Conquer - mobile (2025)
- Tetris - mobile (2020)
- Finger Frenzy (2014)
- Disaster Hero (2013)
- Skate 3 (2010) additional music
- Academy of Champions (2009) additional music
- My Sims Agents (2009) additional music
- Boom Blox Bash Party (2009) additional music
- Mean Girls (2009) additional music
- Wordsworth (2008) additional music
- Boom Blox (2008) additional music
- My Sims Kingdom (2007)
- MySims (2007) additional music
- The Simpsons Game (2007) additional music
- The Sims 2 Castaway (2007) additional music
- The Sims 2 Open For Business (2006) additional music
- The Sims 2 University (2005) additional music
- Frogger: Ancient Shadows (2005) additional music
- The Sims 2 (2004) additional music
- The Sims Mobile (2017) soundtrack
