= 2013 in television =

2013 in television may refer to

- 2013 in American television for television-related events in the United States.
  - List of 2013 American television debuts for television debut related events in the United States.
- 2013 in Australian television for television-related events in Australia.
- 2013 in Belgian television for television-related events in Belgium.
- 2013 in Brazilian television for television-related events in Brazil.
- 2013 in British television for television-related events in the United Kingdom.
  - 2013 in Scottish television for television-related events in Scotland.
- 2013 in Canadian television for television-related events in Canada.
- 2013 in Croatian television for television-related events in Croatia.
- 2013 in Danish television for television-related events in Denmark.
- 2013 in Dutch television for television-related events in the Netherlands.
- 2013 in Estonian television for television-related events in Estonia.
- 2013 in French television for television-related events in France.
- 2013 in German television for television-related events in Germany.
- 2013 in Irish television for television-related events in the Republic of Ireland.
- 2013 in Italian television for television-related events in Italy.
- 2013 in Japanese television for television-related events in Japan.
- 2013 in Mexican television for television-related events in Mexico.
- 2013 in New Zealand television for television-related events in New Zealand.
- 2013 in Norwegian television for television-related events in Norway.
- 2013 in Pakistani television for television-related events in Pakistan.
- 2013 in Philippine television for television-related events in the Philippines.
- 2013 in Polish television for television-related events in Poland.
- 2013 in Portuguese television for television-related events in Portugal.
- 2013 in South African television for television-related events in South Africa.
- 2013 in Spanish television for television-related events in Spain.
- 2013 in Swedish television for television-related events in Sweden.
- 2013 in Turkish television for television-related events in Turkey.
