= The Way We Wore =

The Way We Wore may refer to:

- The Way We Wore: Styles of the 1930s and '40s and Our World Since Then, a 1993 book by American actress Marsha Hunt
- The Way We Wore: 250 Years of Irish Clothing and Jewellery, a permanent exhibition at the National Museum of Ireland – Decorative Arts and History since 1997
- The Way We Wore: A Life in Threads, a 2006 book by British writer Robert Elms
- The Way We Wore, a vintage clothing shop in Los Angeles featured in the 2013 television documentary series L.A. Frock Stars
- The Way We Wore, a 2023 Australian television documentary miniseries presented by Celeste Barber

== See also ==
- The Way We Were (disambiguation)
