= Tara Lewis =

Tara Lewis may refer to:

- Tara Lewis (actress) in The Sisterhood (TV series)
- Tara Lewis (singer) on The Voice UK (series 3)
- Dr. Tara Lewis, main character in Criminal Minds portrayed by Aisha Tyler.
