= Washington Heights =

Washington Heights may refer to:

== Places ==
=== Japan ===
- Washington Heights (Tokyo), a former US Army barracks and housing area during the occupation of Japan

=== United States ===
- Washington Heights, Chicago, Illinois
  - 103rd Street/Washington Heights station
- Washington Heights, East Brunswick, New Jersey
- Washington Heights, Manhattan, New York City, New York
- Washington Heights, Walkill, New York
- Washington Heights, Roanoke, Virginia
- Washington Heights, Milwaukee, Wisconsin
- Washington Heights Historic District, Washington, D.C.

== Other uses ==
- Washington Heights (film), a 2003 film set in Washington Heights, Manhattan
- Washington Heights (TV series), an MTV reality show
