= The Devil Dogs =

American garage punk band

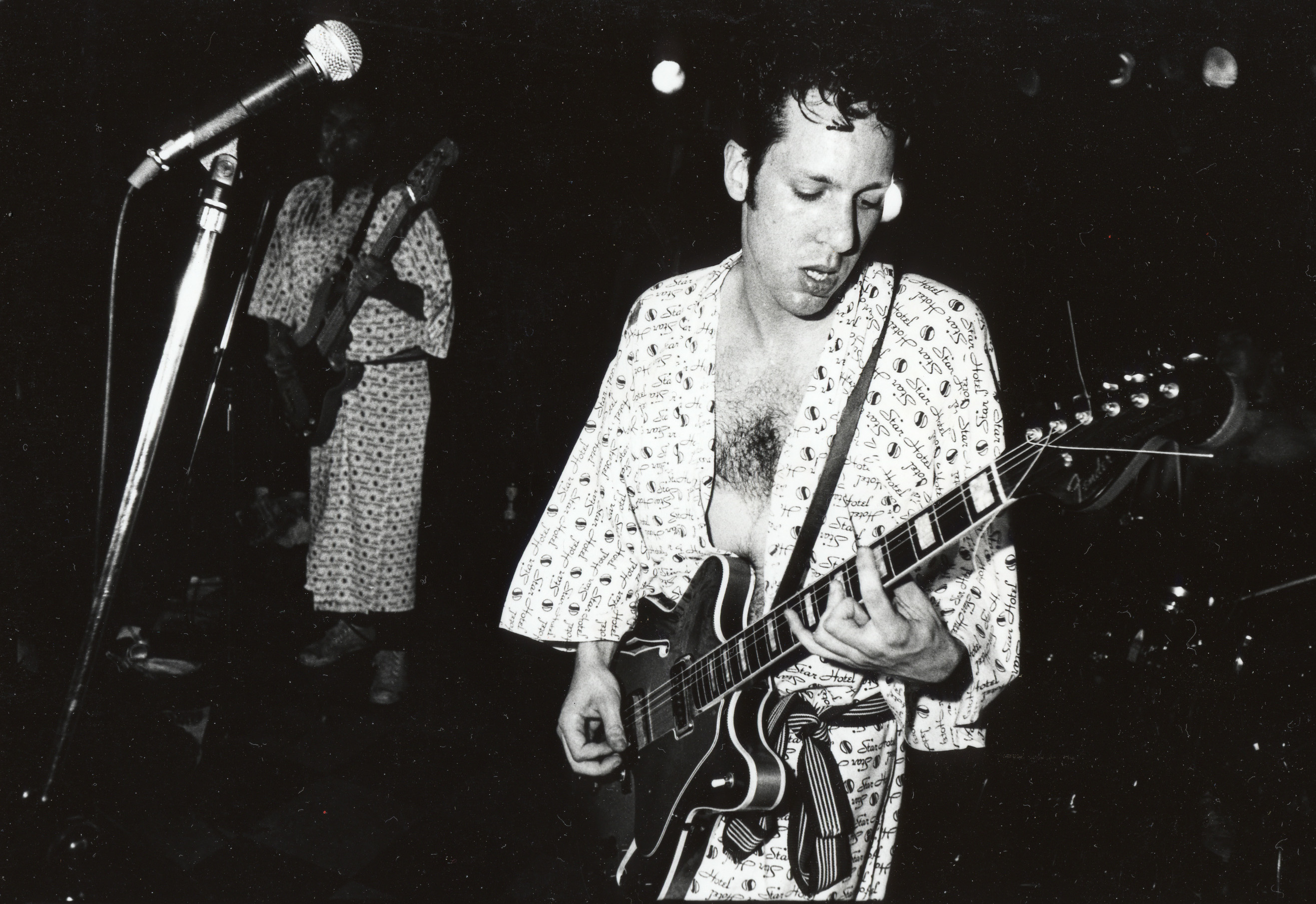
- The Devil Dogs in Tokyo

Background information
- Origin: New York City, New York, United States
- Genres: Garage punk; rock and roll
- Years active: 1989–1994
- Labels: Sympathy For The Record Industry, Crypt Records, Empty Records, Impossible Records
- Spinoff of: Rat Bastards
- Past members: Andy Gortler, Steve Baise, Paul Corio, Dave Ari, Mighty Joe Vincent, Mike Mariconda

The Devil Dogs were an American, New York-based garage punk band, started in 1989 by Andy Gortler (guitars), Steve Baise (bass) and Paul Corio (drums).

Two members of the Devil Dogs (Gortler and Baise) had been members of the Rat Bastards when that band dissolved during the recording of an album; they regrouped as The Devil Dogs and continued recording. Drummer Mighty Joe Vincent joined the group in 1991. They parted in late 1994.

Steve Baise moved on and collaborated with members of Turbonegro on a mid-1990s band called The Vikings.

== Discography ==
- Devil Dogs LP (Crypt Records, 1989, CR-019)
- Big Beef Bonanza MLP (Crypt, 1990, CR-022)
- Devil's Hits CD (1+2 Records, 1991, 1+2 CD 008)
- We Three Kings MLP/MCD (Crypt, 1991, CR-028)
- 30 Sizzling Slabs CD (Crypt, 1992, CR-CD-192228)
- Saturday Night Fever LP (Crypt, 1993, CR-035)
- Saturday Night Fever CD (Sympathy For The Record Industry, 1993, SFTRI 231)
- Live At The Revolver Club - The Greatest Rock 'N' Roll Album You'll Never Hear! LP (Impossible Records, 1993, Impossible 022)
- ... Stereodrive! CD (1+2 Records, 1994, 1+2 CD 060)
- Choadblast CD (Empty Records, 1994, MTR-218)
- Bigger Beef Bonanza! CD (Crypt, 1996, CR-022)
- No Requests Tonight LP/CD (Sympathy For The Record Industry, 1997, SFTRI 310)
