= Boom Blox Bash Party =

2009 video game

- Developer: EA Los Angeles
- Publisher: Electronic Arts
- Director: Steven Spielberg
- Producer: Robin Hunicke
- Designer: Stephen Riesenberger
- Programmers: Stuart Capewell; Jeff Dixon
- Artist: Elie Arabian
- Composers: Mark Mothersbaugh; Albert Fox; John Enroth; Silas Hite
- Platform: Wii
- Release: NA: May 19, 2009; EU: May 29, 2009; AU: June 18, 2009
- Genre: Puzzle
- Modes: Single-player, multiplayer

Boom Blox Bash Party, known as Boom Blox Smash Party in non-English territories, is a puzzle video game by Electronic Arts released for the Wii in 2009. The game is a sequel to Boom Blox (2008), developed by EA Los Angeles and directed by filmmaker Steven Spielberg. The game features more than 400 levels, and players are able to download new levels and upload their own custom-created levels to share online.

The gameplay of Boom Blox Bash Party resembles the original's, but features new mechanics. It has less emphasis on the shooting mode, which the developers commented was their least favorite mode of play in Boom Blox. It was created as part of a deal between Electronic Arts and Steven Spielberg to make three original properties, though it does not count as one of the three original properties. As of April 2012, EA has shut down the online servers, meaning players can no longer upload and download user created games.

== Gameplay ==
An underwater level with Bomb Blox exploding, launching nearby gems and blox.

Boom Blox Bash Party features similar gameplay to its predecessor. It features a new slingshot mechanic; the shooting mechanic is less prominent than in the first game. The game includes new environments (such as underwater and outer space), new block shapes (such as cylinders and ramps), and more extensive multiplayer.

Boom Blox Bash Party originally allowed players to upload levels, as well as download levels made by other players and Electronic Arts. Uploaded levels had to be reviewed by Electronic Arts, with any inappropriate content filtered out. However, a player could download any levels made by someone on their Wii Friends list. Boom Blox Bash Party did not feature Friend Codes, a common method of online play in Wii and Nintendo DS games. Some of the levels uploaded by EA include levels from the original Boom Blox. The ability to upload and download levels ended on April 13, 2012 when EA shut down all of the servers.

== Development ==
Bash Party's development was announced on 18 November 2008 by Variety. It was announced for a Spring 2009 release as Boom Blox Bash Party on January 28, 2009 by EA Casual. The game was developed by Electronic Arts and Steven Spielberg, just like its predecessor. It was a part of a 2005 deal between EA and Spielberg to make three original properties. It was conceived as soon as the original game was completed. Spielberg kept meeting with EA on Boom Blox on new ideas; producer Amir Rahimi commented that there was so much enthusiasm that "he could hardly stop them from doing a sequel." A feature which was cut from Boom Blox and its sequel was a head-tracking system, which would have allowed the player to use two Wii Remotes to control the game's camera with his or her head. When creating the game, Spielberg noted that the multiplayer interactivity was a primary focus due to popular demand. Because the developers didn't receive the development hardware in time to implement it, Wii MotionPlus compatibility is not included. In an interview, it was stated that Steven Spielberg had sometimes expressed interest in making a Boom Blox movie, but an Electronic Arts spokesperson commented that it was merely Spielberg brainstorming, and no plans for such a movie existed.

== Reception ==
Reception

Aggregate scores
Aggregator	Score
GameRankings	87% (36 reviews)
Metacritic	86/100 (48 reviews)

Review scores
Publication	Score
1Up.com	A
Destructoid	9/10
Edge	8/10
Eurogamer	9/10
Game Informer	8.75/10
GamePro	8/10
GameSpot	8.5/10
GameTrailers	8.5/10
Giant Bomb	8/10
IGN	8.5/10
Nintendo Life	9/10
Nintendo Power	8/10
Nintendo World Report	9/10
Official Nintendo Magazine	9.2/10
VideoGamer.com	9/10

Boom Blox Bash Party has received generally favorable reviews from critics, holding 86 out of 100 on Metacritic and 87.35% on GameRankings. Critics praised the game for adding various improvements upon its predecessor, particularly for the level creation tools and online level sharing. Gaming journalists considered it the "definitive version" of the gameplay from Boom Blox, citing it as "casual gaming done right". IGN awarded Bash Party an Editors' Choice award, giving it 8.5 out of 10. G4's X-Play gave it 5 out of 5 stars. GameShark editor Danielle Riendeau gave the game a near perfect score, stating that "Bash Party absolutely blows its predecessor out of the water", with the website awarding it the "Best Party Game Without Beatles in the Title" in 2009.

In retrospective reviews, the game is considered one of the best Wii games of all time, and was listed in Edge editor Tony Mott's 1001 Video Games You Must Play Before You Die. GameZone ranked the game #46 in their list of the top 50 Wii games, and GamesRadar+ ranked it #12 overall. Nintendo World Report ranked the game third place for their top third-party Wii games of all time, comparing Bash Party positively to Wii Sports, as "it took a simple idea and just executed it really well".
