= Boom Blox =

2008 video game

- Developer: EA Los Angeles
- Publisher: Electronic Arts
- Directors: Steven Spielberg; Jason Chayes
- Producer: Amir Rahimi
- Programmer: Jeff Dixon
- Artist: Ken Harsha
- Composers: Mark Mothersbaugh; Albert Fox; John Enroth; Silas Hite
- Platforms: Wii, N-Gage
- Release: Wii: NA: May 6, 2008; AU: May 8, 2008; EU: May 9, 2008; JP: July 17, 2008; N-Gage: WW: December 3, 2008
- Genre: Puzzle
- Modes: Single-player, multiplayer

Boom Blox is a 2008 puzzle video game by Electronic Arts for the Wii and N-Gage. It was developed by EA Los Angeles and directed by filmmaker Steven Spielberg.

The game presents a series of physics-based puzzles, the objective being either to keep structures made of blocks from being knocked down or to knock them over by various means, using the Wii Remote to throw, shoot, and grab at the blocks. Boom Blox features a realistic physics system; the angle at which a projectile is launched and how fast it is thrown as well as the mass of the projectile and the type of blocks it comes into contact with influence the results of an action.

The game has over 300 single-player levels as well as over 100 cooperative and competitive multiplayer levels. Additionally, there is a mode that allows players to create their own levels and share them with people added to their Friend Code list via WiiConnect24. A sequel, Boom Blox Bash Party, was released in 2009.

== Gameplay ==
Boom Blox has been described as Jenga meets Tetris Blast, Breakout, Duck Hunt, and Lego. Gameplay emphasises reflexes, dexterity, and problem-solving skills. It features a physics model that ensures the blocks collapse realistically, and also measures the velocity at which an object is thrown, recognising four distinct speeds. In the game, players use the Wii Remote to manipulate bowling balls, baseballs, laser guns, and water hoses in order to knock over structures made of blocks. Alternately, they use the Wii Remote to grab blocks in Jenga-style gameplay, taking care to remove a maximum number of blocks without toppling the precariously stacked tower.

There are different kinds of blocks in the game such as gem blocks, blocks with point values attached, explosive blocks that detonate on contact, vanishing blocks that disappear when struck, wood blocks, and steel blocks. Just as the type of blocks with which the player must contend changes as the player progresses, so do the tactics for completing the level. The player might have to avoid letting blocks with negative point values attached fall while destroying blocks with positive point values attached. In another level, the player might have to set off a series of explosions and domino reactions that target a structure's weak point or ricochet shots off multiple structures in order to destroy the blocks, all with a limited number of projectiles. Different types of blocks possess different physical properties; their mass and the amount of friction they exert alter the way they will respond to contact.

=== Adventure and Explore modes ===
The Adventure and Explore modes are the single-player portion of Boom Blox, constituting over 300 levels. More advanced levels challenge the player with time limits or a limited number of projectiles with which to complete the levels. Each level also challenges the player to get a gold medal, though achieving a bronze medal is all that is required to reach the next level.

Adventure mode is story-based and offers character-driven scenarios that involve defending forts or the various domino-shaped characters from enemy attacks and guiding these characters by clearing the path in front of them as they walk. Explore mode presents puzzle-based objectives that focus on different groups of skills, allowing the player to discover the basic mechanics of the game.

There are four basic "worlds" through which the player must progress. The first, Gem Kingdom, which takes place in medieval times, involves the player aiding a group of sheep dressed like knights to gather gems, and then protect said gems from invaders. The second level, Gorilda Rescue, takes place in an island jungle and involves the player helping a gorilla named Gert save her children from a tribe of hostile natives called the "Tiki". The third, Boots 'n' Bandits, is set in the Old West, and involves a beaver named Boots mining for gold with the help of the player, only to have it stolen by desperadoes; he then takes the gold back and protects the citizens of the nearby mining town from the bandits. The fourth and final world, Haunted Night, takes place on Halloween and tells the story of a family of kittens trying to get to a mansion at the end of a road; the player must defend them from enemies such as skeletons, grim reapers, and monkeys dressed as devils.

=== Party mode ===
In addition to single player, there are also over 100 cooperative and competitive multiplayer levels available in Party mode that can be played by up to four people on one screen, by taking turns, and on a split screen. Cooperative play involves destroying or building structures together with friends and family while competitive play involves playing against others to accumulate the highest scores by destroying blocks with positive point values attached or attacking the opponent's castle to destroy their gem blocks within.

=== Create mode ===
Create mode is a built-in level editor that can be used to create or modify multiplayer and single-player levels. These levels are designed using different types of blocks unlocked by playing through the single-player Explore mode. The player can alter the size, height, and width of the blocks, clone them, and assign them attributes such as point value or type. Then, the user-created levels can be played or sent to people added to the player's Friend roster via WiiConnect24.

== Development ==
In 2005, it was announced that Steven Spielberg and Electronic Arts would be collaborating to create three new video game titles. Many were surprised when, in July, 2007, EA announced that their first collaboration of the three would be Boom Blox, a puzzle game for Wii. Spielberg explained the unexpected choice, stating that "I really wanted to create a video game that I could play with my kids." He elaborated his younger children enjoy playing the Wii more than the PlayStation 3 or the Xbox 360, and this was a chance to "show [them] they can have fun playing games that are non-violent and much more creative and strategic". His children gave feedback for the game because they were allowed to play a prototype.

Initially, the game was to support headtracking, the repositioning of the virtual in-game camera in relation to player's position in the room. The feature, which was to require two Wii Remotes and an LED headset, was to be included as an Easter egg. However, on April 15, 2008, EA announced that the headtracking feature had been cut from the game.

During development, the focus was on creating a video game specifically for Wii, but senior producer Amir Rahimi has indicated that Boom Blox may be ported to other consoles in the future.

== Reception ==
Reception

Aggregate scores
| Aggregator | Score |
|---|---|
| GameRankings | 87% (31 reviews) |
| Metacritic | 85 (56 reviews) |

Review scores
| Publication | Score |
|---|---|
| 1Up.com | A+ |
| Game Informer | 8.5/10 |
| GameRevolution | B+ |
| GameSpot | 7/10 |
| GamesRadar+ | 9/10 |
| GameTrailers | 8.6 |
| GameZone | 9/10 |
| IGN | 8.1 |
| Nintendo Power | 8/10 |
| Official Nintendo Magazine | 90% |
| X-Play | 5/5 |

Boom Blox received many positive reviews with aggregate scores of 85/100 from Metacritic and 87% from GameRankings. N-Europe gave the game a 9/10 score, praising its "amazing replay value" and its "ingenious puzzles". Electronic Gaming Monthly out of three scores gave it an A+, an A, and an A−, stating it as "immensely accessible, wonderfully tactile, and stands as one of the best uses of 3D space."

=== Awards ===
It was awarded Best Wii Game of the Year by Spike TV in their Video Game Awards. It was awarded Best Family Game for the Wii by IGN in its 2008 video game awards. It was also awarded Best Casual Game of 2008 at the British Academy Video Games Awards. The Academy of Interactive Arts & Sciences nominated Boom Blox in the "Family Game of the Year" category during the 12th Annual Interactive Achievement Awards. In addition, it was nominated in the "Innovation Award" category in 9th Annual Game Developers Choice Awards. It was also nominated for several other Wii-specific awards by IGN, including Best Puzzle Game, Best Local Multiplayer Game, Best Use of the Wii-Mote, and Most Innovative Design.

=== Sales ===
Boom Blox sold 60,000 copies during its first month of availability in the United States, according to the NPD Group. John Riccitiello, CEO of EA at that time, said that the game met internal expectations, though "a number of analysts" expected the game to sell more. In July 2008, EA revealed that Boom Blox sold over 450,000 copies during their first fiscal quarter and "continues to sell well".
