= The Way We Were (disambiguation) =

The Way We Were is a 1973 film starring Barbra Streisand and Robert Redford.

The Way We Were may also refer to:

== Music ==
=== Albums ===
- The Way We Were: Original Soundtrack Recording, from the 1973 film
- The Way We Were (Barbra Streisand album), 1974
- The Way We Were (Andy Williams album), 1974
- The Way We Were (Babe the Blue Ox album), 1998
- The Way We Were (A House album), 2002
- The Way We Were: Live in Concert, by Etta Jones, with Houston Person; recorded 2000, released 2011

=== Songs ===
- "The Way We Were" (song) by Barbra Streisand from the 1973 film
- "The Way We Were" by Will Young from Lexicon
- "The Way We Were" by XX Teens from Welcome to Goon Island

== Television ==
=== Series ===
- The Way We Were (2014 TV series) (16個夏天), a Taiwanese series
- The Way We Were (2018 TV series) (归去来), a Chinese series

=== Episodes ===
- "The Way We Were" (The Bill Engvall Show)
- "The Way We Were" (The Facts of Life)
- "The Way We Were" (Family Ties)
- "The Way We Were" (The Fresh Prince of Bel-Air)
- "The Way We Were" (Girlfriends)
- "The Way We Were" (The O.C.)
- "The Way We Were" (The Royal)
- "The Way We Were" (That's So Raven)

== Other uses ==
- The Way We Were, an exhibition at the Wigan Pier in Wigan, Lancashire, England

== See also ==
- "The Way We Was", a 1991 episode of The Simpsons
- "The Way We Weren't", a 2004 episode of The Simpsons
- "The Way We Weren't" (Farscape), a 2000 episode of Farscape
- The Way We Wore (disambiguation)
- "The Wayz We Were", a 2021 episode of The Simpsons
