= Walter Bond =

American basketball player (born 1969)

Personal information
- Born: February 1, 1969 (age 57) Chicago, Illinois, U.S.
- Listed height: 6 ft 5 in (1.96 m)
- Listed weight: 200 lb (91 kg)

Career information
- High school: Collins (Chicago, Illinois)
- College: Minnesota (1987–1991)
- NBA draft: 1991: undrafted
- Playing career: 1991–1999
- Position: Shooting guard
- Number: 40, 20, 9

Career history
- 1991–1992: Wichita Falls Texans
- 1992–1993: Dallas Mavericks
- 1993–1994: Utah Jazz
- 1994: Detroit Pistons
- 1995: Utah Jazz
- 1995: Chicago Rockers
- 1996: Gymnastikos Larissa
- 1996–1997: Connecticut Pride
- 1997: La Crosse Bobcats
- 1997–1998: Yakama Sun Kings
- 1998: Select Avellino
- 1998–1999: TSV Bayer 04 Leverkusen

Career highlights
- CBA All-Rookie Team (1992)

Career NBA statistics
- Points: 873
- Rebounds: 289
- Assists: 177
- Stats at NBA.com
- Stats at Basketball Reference

Walter Thomas Bond (born February 1, 1969) is an American former professional basketball player. A 200-pound, 6'5" shooting guard from the University of Minnesota, Bond was not drafted by an NBA team, but did manage to play in 3 NBA seasons.

== Career ==
He was born in Chicago, Illinois. Bond played for the Minnesota Golden Gophers men's basketball team from 1987 to 1991, averaging 8.1 points and 3.8 rebounds in 93 contests.

Coming out of college, he made his professional debut in the World Basketball League with the Saskatchewan Storm.

In the NBA, he played for the Dallas Mavericks (1992/93), Utah Jazz (1993/94) and Detroit Pistons (1994/95). In January 1995 Bond signed two 10-day contracts with Utah Jazz.

In his NBA career, Bond played in 157 games (154 in regular season), and scored a total of 874 points. He scored 590 points in 1 season with the Dallas Mavericks, 273 points in two seasons with Utah Jazz, and 10 points in one season with the Detroit Pistons On November 10, 1992, in just his second professional game in the NBA, he scored a career high 25 points as a Maverick against the Minnesota Timberwolves. His single game scoring stats declined for the rest of his 151 NBA games.

Bond played for five different teams in the Continental Basketball Association between 1991 and 1998. In 1992, he made the CBA All-Rookie Team. His best CBA season came in 1994–95, when he scored 24 points a contest for the Chicago Rockers.

He also played professionally in Italy for Cirio Avellino (Serie A2, Jan–Jun '98) and for TSV Bayer 04 Leverkusen in the German Basketball Bundesliga. For Leverkusen, Bond averaged 16.4 points per contest in Bundesliga play during the 1998–99 season.

Bond was a member of the Minnesota Timberwolves' broadcast team and is a motivational speaker. He is the host of Food Network series Giving You The Business, which premiered in April 2013.
