= Kevin Michael Connolly =

American photographer

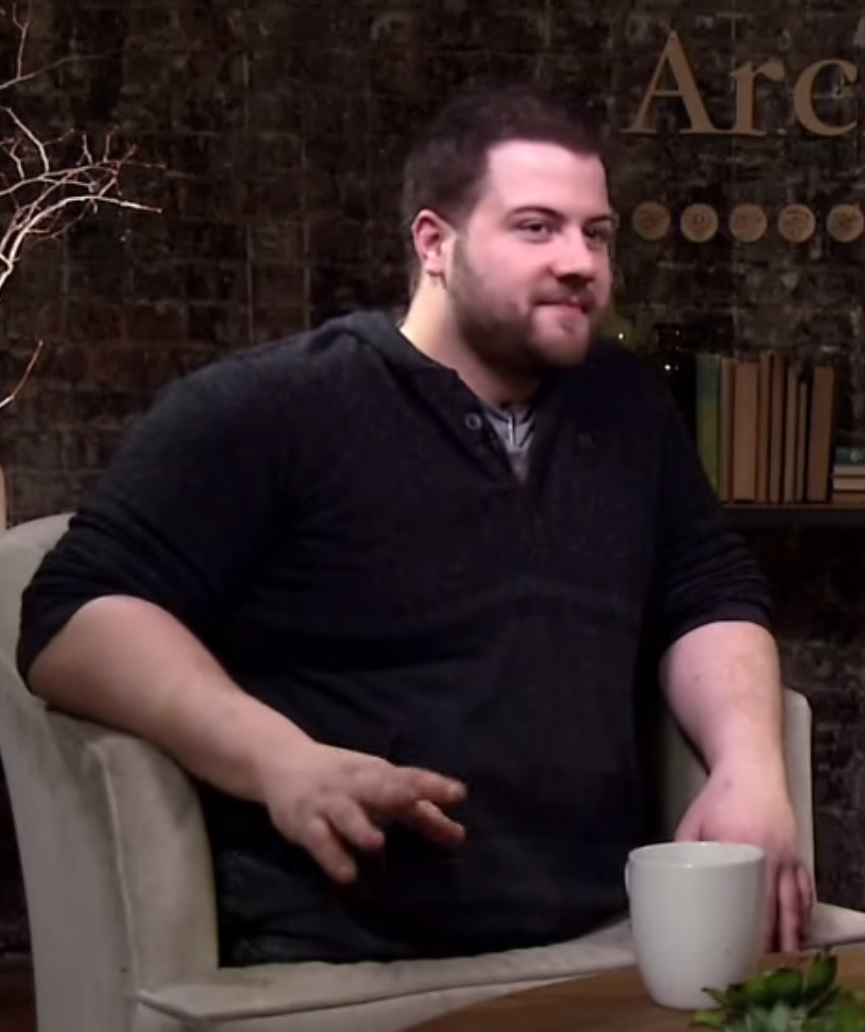
Connolly on Archetypes interview program in 2013.

Kevin Michael Connolly is an American photographer who was born without legs. He has made a collection of photographs of people's reactions to him as he traveled the world, and published it on the Internet. In February 2013, the Travel Channel network premiered a new reality series starring Connolly entitled Armed & Ready, featuring Connolly travelling around the U.S. and the world engaging in local events and physical challenges.

== Early life ==
Connolly was born in Helena, Montana, in August, 1985. He was born without legs, as a "'sporadic birth defect,' which is basically the doctors saying they don't know what happened.", he says.

His parents didn't coddle him; as a toddler he wasn't treated any differently than his sisters, Meagan and Shannon, and grew up floating rivers and climbing mountains. His parents enrolled him in gymnastics, and wrestling, which gave him the agility and upper body strength to flip himself onto counters and do handstands. At the age of 10, he started skiing, with a custom designed monoski. He was good enough at skiing to win a silver medal at the X Games extreme sports competition. He travels mostly by propelling himself with his arms on his skateboard, rarely using his wheelchair, and not using a pair of prosthetic legs since age 12.

== Photographic exhibition ==
One day, on a 2006 solo trip through Europe, in Vienna, Connolly got tired of being stared at, and without looking through the camera's viewfinder, took a series of photos of people staring at him as he wheeled by. He liked the results. With the money from his X Games winnings, he took an 11-week international trip over summer break in 2007, through 15 countries, through New Zealand, Europe, Japan, and back to America. He published the photos on a web site, called "The Rolling Exhibition.com"

Connolly's initial exhibit drew national media attention, garnering stories at CNET, NPR, The Washington Post, and ABC's 20/20. The exposure and interest in Connolly's life lead to a book deal with HarperCollins. Instead of releasing a book simply consisting of his photographs, Connolly penned a memoir using photos as chapter breaks. The resulting book, Double Take (HarperStudio – Oct 2009), was well received by critics and earned a starred review in Publishers Weekly.

== Armed and Ready ==
In February 2013, the Travel Channel network premiered a new reality series starring Connolly entitled Armed & Ready. The show features Connolly travelling around the U.S. and the world engaging in local events and physical challenges.

== Bibliography ==
- Double Take: A Memoir. New York, NY: HarperCollins Publishers, 2009.
