= 10 Seconds (game show) =

- Genre: Game show
- Created by: Allen Reid; Mady Land
- Directed by: Ken Vincent
- Presented by: Dan Miller
- Announcer: Don Dashiell
- Country of origin: United States
- No. of episodes: 130

Production
- Executive producers: Allen Reid; Mady Land; C. Paul Corbin for TNN
- Production locations: Opryland USA; Nashville, Tennessee
- Production company: Reid/Land Productions

Original release
- Network: The Nashville Network
- Release: March 29 – September 24, 1993

10 Seconds is a television game show that aired on The Nashville Network from March 29 to September 24, 1993. After the last episode aired, the show went into reruns until March 25, 1994. The show was hosted by Dan Miller and announced by Don Dashiell. Miller and Dashiell were also the host-announcer team for Top Card, the quiz show that 10 Seconds replaced on the schedule following its cancellation.

== Maingame ==
Two contestants, one usually a returning champion, competed in a game of identifying songs.

Nine categories were displayed. Each category was the clue to the title of a song, and each one hid a point value. The champion started the match by choosing one of the categories, revealing how many points the category was worth. The higher the points were, the more difficult the song would be to identify. After a category was chosen, Miller would tell the contestants the year the song was released, whether a solo artist or group performed the song and (if the former) if the singer was a man or a woman, and the song's position on either the country or pop music charts.

Once all that information was revealed, it was up to the opposing contestant to decide how long the contestant would have to listen to the song. The opponent would choose a number of seconds of music to be played (by pressing one of ten buttons in front of them), between 1 and 10 seconds; each amount of time could only be given once per round (the number indicating the number of seconds is no longer lit after the contestant controlling the clock pressed the button). At that point, the contestant who chose the category decided to play that song or pass it to their opponent. The clip would be played; answering correctly won the points while answering incorrectly or taking too much time (not answering after the song clip stopped playing) gave the points to the opposing contestant. Play would then continue with the trailing contestant making the next selection while the contestant in the lead controlling the clock.

Two rounds were played. In the first round categories were worth between 10 and 50 points, in five-point increments, and it was possible for the same number to appear multiple times on the board. In the second round, points ranged from 20 to 100, still in five-point increment, and in addition, the last category left on the board at the end of the second round was played for double its value for a possible 200 points.

=== Catch-Up round ===
In the third and final round, called the "Catch-Up Round", the trailing contestant had a chance to earn up to 400 points. A ten-second medley of three songs were played and the contestant had to identify the artist behind each song. Each correct answer was worth 100 points, and a bonus of 100 points was given if the contestant got all three. If the trailer was able to catch and/or pass the leader, the leader was given his/her own ten second medley to try to regain the lead and win the game. Whichever contestant was ahead at the end of the Catch-Up round won the game, an additional prize and played the bonus round for a chance at a cash jackpot.

The Catch-Up round was not played if the trailing contestant did not have enough points (more than 400 points behind) to be within the catch-up range.

== Bonus round ==
In the bonus round, the winning contestant was given 60 seconds to name nine songs. As before, there were nine categories on the game board. Unlike the front game, the categories were played in order, moving from left to right, top to bottom. The song fitting the category was played for several seconds. For each song the champion correctly identified, he/she won a prize and the prizes grew in value for each correct answer. If the champion could not identify the song fitting the category, it was blocked and could be tried again after all nine categories had been played (time permitting).

Getting all nine songs before time expired won the champion a cash jackpot, which started out at $2,500 (later $1,000) and increased by $500 each day until it was claimed. The highest jackpot won was $14,000. Champions continued until defeated or the jackpot was won.

On one episode from July 13, 1993, a fur coat was given away in the bonus round, the last known instance of a fur given away as a prize on an American game show.
