= Wild Deep =

- Genre: Documentary
- Narrated by: Dave Fennoy
- Country of origin: United States
- Original language: English
- No. of seasons: 1
- No. of episodes: 6

Production
- Running time: 30 minutes
- Production company: Best Film Company

Original release
- Network: Animal Planet
- Release: January 22 – February 5, 2013

Wild Deep is an American documentary television series produced by Best Film Company. The series premiered on Animal Planet on January 22, 2013. The series showcases marine life at various regions in the world, such as Africa, Europe, Oceania, and the Americas.
