= Rebel Eats =

- Genre: Food reality television
- Country of origin: United States
- Original language: English

Production
- Running time: 41:00

Original release
- Network: Food Network
- Release: 2013

Related
- Food Network Star

Rebel Eats is an American television pilot that aired on Food Network in 2013. The show was hosted and executive produced by Justin Warner.
