= AFL on TNN =

The AFL on TNN is a TV program from TNN Sports that showed Arena Football League games on The National Network (now Paramount Network) from the 2000 season through 2002.

== Background ==
The year 2000 brought a heightened interest in the AFL after Kurt Warner, who spent three years as quarterback of the AFL's Iowa Barnstormers, rose to fame as starting quarterback for The Greatest Show on Turf, the Super Bowl-winning offense of the then-St. Louis Rams. While many sports commentators and fans continued to ridicule the league, Warner's story gave the league positive exposure, and it brought the league a new television deal with TNN, who would televise regular season games live on Sunday afternoons.

The TNN deal coincided with the league's emergence as one with a major presence on the North American continent. Major markets such as Chicago, Detroit, Dallas, and Los Angeles, each of which had lacked franchises for many years, returned to the league, it received its first and only franchise in Canada (the Toronto Phantoms), and teams in smaller markets such as Albany and Iowa were relocated. In 2001, the league peaked at 19 teams.

Included in the deal for the league was the right to broadcast the ArenaCup, the championship for the newly established arenafootball2, conceived as a minor league for metropolitan areas too small to support arena football as a major sport. ArenaCups I and II were carried on TNN.

== Commentators ==
- Jill Arrington – Arrington was the host of the Arena Football League's pregame show on TNN as well as the sideline reporter for arena football games for 3 seasons.
- Ed Cunningham – after his football career, he became a football analyst for TNN (now known as Paramount Network) calling games for the Arena Football League with Eli Gold as his broadcast partner.
- Eli Gold – best known for his work calling NASCAR, also radio "Voice of the Crimson Tide".
- John Jurkovic – former NFL player who called af2's Arena Cup 2001 with Eli Gold on TNN.
- Mark May – former NFL player who called AFL games, replacing Ed Cunningham, as well as af2's Arena Cup 2000 with Eli Gold on TNN Sports. (Now with ESPN.)

== End ==
TNN's coverage of the AFL ended after the 2002 season. In 2003, NBC Sports, who had attempted to establish the XFL (a league that TNN had concurrently carried) as an alternative to the National Football League in 2001 but failed to establish a permanent audience for it, tried again by signing an exclusive rights deal with the Arena Football League. TNN itself was moving away from live sports, at the time transitioning to a network named Spike TV.
