= Untold: The Greatest Sports Stories Never Told =

- Genre: Sports
- Written by: Dan Klein; Brian Brown; Aaron Cohen; Ouisie Shapiro
- Directed by: Dan Klein; Bill McCullough
- Presented by: Marv Albert
- Composers: Bill McCullough; John Wiggins
- Country of origin: United States
- Original language: English
- No. of seasons: 1
- No. of episodes: 9

Production
- Executive producers: Keith Brown; Dan Klein
- Producers: Dan Klein; Bill McCullough; Emilie Deutsch; Terri Lee Fiedler
- Production locations: New York City, New York, United States
- Editors: Bill McCullough; Lars Fuchs
- Camera setup: Rod Bachar
- Running time: 60 minutes
- Production company: Wonderland Productions

Original release
- Network: Spike TV
- Release: November 12, 2004 – February 11, 2005

Untold: The Greatest Sports Stories Never Told is an original one-hour documentary series featuring some of sports' most compelling figures and the challenges they've endured. It was hosted by Marv Albert. The series aired on Spike TV from 2004 to 2005.

== Opening sequence ==
The high times. Let me tell you about the high times. The hoopla. Let me tell you about the hoopla. The cheering. The jeering. The loss. The love. Despair. Wait, wait. (cheering) Bounce back. These are their stories. Unwritten, undefined, untold. When the game is done, life continues.

== Episode list ==
1. "Terry Bradshaw" – November 12, 2004
2. "Bo Jackson" – November 19, 2004
3. "Darryl Strawberry" – December 3, 2004
4. "Ricky Williams" – January 7, 2005
5. "Laird Hamilton" – February 4, 2005
6. "Isiah Thomas" – February 11, 2005
