= Giving You the Business =

Giving You the Business premiered on Food Network on Thursday April 25, 2013 at 10pm Eastern Time. In this program hosted by former NBA player turned motivational speaker Walter Bond, a CEO from a major food chain, handpicks four standout employees and secretly puts them to a series of tests of outrageous skills.These four employees are being recorded by covert cameras at all times. The winning candidate ultimately receives the key to their own food business, which may be valued up to $500,000 in total.

== Kris Herrera lawsuit ==
Kris Herrera, a manager at 16 Handles in New York City, won a May 23, 2013 episode of the Food Network show "Giving You the Business," where he was promised his own 16 Handles franchise. Instead, he received a single, non-transferable share of stock in the parent company. Herrera has filed a lawsuit against the Food Network, Scripps Networks, 16 Handles founder Solomon Choi, and other entities, alleging breach of contract, fraud, and violation of his privacy rights. He claims he was misled and subjected to embarrassing situations during filming and that his daughters' images were used without consent.
