= Pot Cops =

American reality television series

- Genre: Docudrama
- Country of origin: United States
- No. of seasons: 1
- No. of episodes: 3

Production
- Producer: Jato C. Smith
- Editor: Rich Winkler
- Running time: 40–44 minutes
- Production company: Hoggard Films

Original release
- Network: Discovery Channel
- Release: February 20 – April 17, 2013

Related
- Weed Country

Pot Cops is an American reality television series that aired on the Discovery Channel. The show premiered on February 20, 2013, during Discovery Channel's programming block titled "Weed Wednesdays", along with Weed Country. The series followed dealers, growers and patients of the marijuana trade in Humboldt County, California, located within the Emerald Triangle, along with the enforcers of the law at the Humboldt County Sheriff's office. Well known Humboldt County grower Timothy Littlefield is featured prominently in an episode where a garden was raided in a joint investigation with the Humboldt County Sheriff's Office and the Bureau of Indian Affairs Police. Pot Cops highlighted the difficulty that Humboldt County law enforcement officers faced in enforcing marijuana laws in California, after the passage of Proposition 215 in 1996 and before Proposition 64 in 2016.

== Cast ==
- Lt. Wayne Hanson, Head of the Humboldt County Drug Task Force (HCDTF)
- Deputy Todd Fulton, Drug Enforcement Unit
- Sgt. Bryan Quenell, Drug Enforcement Unit
- Deputy Greg Musson, Drug Enforcement Unit
- Deputy Blake Massaro, Drug Enforcement Unit, HCDTF
- Agent Steve Dunn, Humboldt County Drug Task Force Special Agent

== Episodes ==
No.	Title	Original release date	U.S. viewers (millions)
1	"Cartel Threat"	February 20, 2013	N/A
2	"Buried in Weed"	April 3, 2013	N/A
3	"End of Harvest"	April 17, 2013	N/A
