= Bath Township, Ohio =

Bath Township, Ohio, may refer to:

- Bath Township, Allen County, Ohio
- Bath Township, Greene County, Ohio
- Bath Township, Summit County, Ohio
