= Pretty Wicked Moms =

- Genre: Reality
- Starring: Emily Dees Boulden; Nicole Clemons Noles; Miranda Carlson; Nicole Bennett-Hragyil; Meredith Underwood; Marci Rubin Gold
- Theme music composer: Meredith Brooks
- Opening theme: "Bitch"
- Country of origin: United States
- Original language: English
- No. of seasons: 1
- No. of episodes: 9

Production
- Executive producers: Amy Nobile; Chris Costine; Ellen Rakieten; Fiona Kennedy; Gena McCarthy; Noah Pollack; Paul Barrosse; Rob Sharenow; Trisha Ashworth
- Production location: Atlanta, Georgia
- Camera setup: Multiple
- Running time: 40–43 minutes
- Production company: Ellen Rakieten Entertainment

Original release
- Network: Lifetime
- Release: June 4 – July 30, 2013

Pretty Wicked Moms is an American reality television series on Lifetime. The series premiered on June 4, 2013. It follows the lives of six mothers living in Atlanta, Georgia.

== Cast ==
=== Emily Dees Boulden ===
Emily Dees Boulden "The Queen Bee" is married to Peter Boulden, with two daughters, Amzie and Atley and one son Brax. She is the owner of the fashion boutique Swank. Her husband Pete, and Miranda's husband, Chris, have been best friends since kindergarten. She is a graduate of the University of Mississippi and a native of Philadelphia, Mississippi. Swank is located in Atlanta, Georgia Shop around Lenox.

=== Nicole Clemons Noles ===
Nicole Clemons Noles "The Doggy Mom" is the "mother" to her Shih-Tzu, Sommer, and is married to Patrick Noles. She now has a daughter named Natalie. She lives in Birmingham, Alabama.

=== Miranda Carlson ===
Miranda Carlson "The Southern Belle" is married to Chris and is a stay-at-home mom to their son Ledger and daughter Holland. Miranda and Emily have a long time feud from when Emily first moved to Georgia. Miranda has even publicly announced that Emily's shop is known as "Skank" instead of "Swank".

=== Nicole Bennett-Hragyil ===
Nicole Bennett-Hragyil "The Alpha Mom" is married to Craig, with a daughter, McKinley. Nicole is extremely concerned about having a healthy lifestyle, keeping her, Craig and McKinley on a strict diet. Craig Hragyil - one of the owners of KU is an ex-con who spent 3 years in prison for internet fraud and the theft of senior citizens' savings.

=== Meredith Underwood ===
Meredith Underwood "The Newbie" is married to Brad and is a stay-at-home mother to their daughter, Addison. They named their daughter after the character Addison Montgomery from Grey's Anatomy and Private Practice.

=== Marci Rubin Gold ===
Marci Rubin Gold "The Divorcee" is recently divorced and raising her three kids, sons Dylan and Andrew, and daughter, Jordan. She appeared on LifeTime's Dance Moms Holiday Special as an audience member with her daughter Jordan.

== Episodes ==
No.	Title	Original release date	U.S. viewers (millions)
1	"Queen Bee vs. Southern Belle"	June 4, 2013	0.80
Series premiere; Emily hosts a get together at Swank with all the moms, things get heated when Miranda accidentally steps on Nicole N's dog, Sommer, earning her a bite from the dog. Emily and Nicole B talk about having a "makeover day" and wanting to make over Meredith.
2	"Amzie's Super Sweet Second Birthday"	June 11, 2013	0.72
The mothers get together for lunch while the husbands watch the children so they can clear the air. It becomes clear to Nicole B. that teams have been created, consisting of her and Miranda; and Emily, Nicole N. and Meredith. Before Amzie's party, a friend of Nicole B's calls her and tells her that while shopping at Emily's store, an employee told her that Emily hates Nicole. After hearing the conversation, Nicole's husband, Craig, refuses to go to Amzie's birthday party because of how he feels about Emily. During the party, Meredith and Miranda get into it over Ledger's sleep schedule. Meredith doesn't think Miranda should base her schedule on her child, it should be the other way around, then calls her fake after Miranda leaves. The day after, Nicole B. shows up to Swank to talk to Emily about their differences. She apologizes for not showing up to the party and tells Emily what her friend told her about not liking her. Emily gets defensive and says she never said that and after a heated conversation, Nicole leaves.
3	"Meredith's Makeover Madness"	June 18, 2013	0.64
Marci has a Halloween party at her house, where all the women show up except Miranda who had other plans. When Meredith shows up in a greasy mechanic costume while the other moms are dressed up in pretty, girly costumes, Emily and Nicole N. decide to give her a makeover. The next day, Meredith meets Emily and Nicole at Emily's store, Swank. While trying on different outfits the girls have picked out for her, she tells them of a terrible car accident she was in years ago before she got married that left her with amnesia for two years and an altered personality. She had amnesia when she got married and doesn't even remember her wedding. Following her fashion upgrade, Meredith visits Emily's husband Pete for a smile makeover at Atlanta Dental Spa, where she can barely contain her excitement after seeing the results. After Emily and Nicole make her over, they decide to throw her a surprise party for her new look and they invite all the moms and their husbands. At the party, Meredith is revealed to have a full makeover and some of the moms, including Nicole B., says she looks just like Emily. During the party, Emily and Nicole N. gather everyone's attention to show the wedding video of Meredith and Brad, a video that Meredith has never seen. Before they can show the video, Meredith starts crying and begs them not to show it. She says she isn't comfortable watching it and isn't ready to see it yet. The video isn't shown and shortly thereafter, everyone leaves.
4	"Three's a Crowd"	June 25, 2013	0.75
5	"Moms Gone Wild in Miami"	July 2, 2013	0.55
6	"Pretty Wicked In-Laws"	July 9, 2013	0.44
7	"The Ledger Crisis"	July 16, 2013	N/A
8	"Pretty Wicked Holidays"	July 23, 2013	0.69
9	"Pajama Party Brawl"	July 30, 2013	0.83

== Reception ==
Reception of the new series has been uniformly negative. Hitfix responded to the show: "OK, Lifetime, you win. Somehow you've found women more vile, more petulant, and possibly dumber than most of the women in The Real Housewives franchise. Congratulations. I think Pretty Wicked Moms may be a sign of the coming Rapture, or maybe just confirmation that at least some of the mean girls we all remember from high school didn't change or mature in any way."

Dennis Perkins at The A.V. Club rated the show an 'F', saying that "If it were discovered that this depiction of the petty, insipid catfighting amongst a sextet of monied Georgia mothers was actually the creation of a rabid men's movement hell bent on turning public opinion in favor of repealing the 19th amendment, it would make more sense than a network at least nominally vested in women's issues choosing to air a show that makes the entire gender a dispiriting, hateful laughingstock."
