= Generation Cryo =

American reality television series

- Genre: Reality
- Country of origin: United States
- Original language: English
- No. of seasons: 1
- No. of episodes: 6

Production
- Executive producers: Betsy Forhan; Dave Sirulnick; Ellen Windemuth; Jonathan Mussman; Marshall Eisen; Michael Lang; Nomi Ernst Leidner
- Running time: 42 minutes
- Production company: Off the Fence

Original release
- Network: MTV
- Release: November 25 – December 23, 2013

Generation Cryo is an American reality television series that premiered on November 25, 2013, on MTV. Generation Cryo chronicles 17-year-old Breeanna who discovered her 15 half-siblings via the Donor Sibling Registry. Breeanna and her 15 siblings were conceived via sperm donors. While connecting with her half-brothers and sisters, Breeanna gets everyone together to search for their biological father.

== Cast ==
- Breeanna
- Jonah and Hilit
- Jayme and Jesse
- Paige, Molly, and Will
- Jesse

== Episodes ==
No.	Title	Original release date
1	"Who's Your Daddy"	November 25, 2013
2	"Come to Grips"	December 2, 2013
3	"We're Your Family"	December 9, 2013
4	"Closing In"	December 16, 2013
5	"The Reunion"	December 23, 2013
6	"One Last Trip"	December 23, 2013
