= Starter Wives Confidential =

- Genre: Reality
- Country of origin: United States
- No. of seasons: 1
- No. of episodes: 3

Production
- Running time: 40 to 42 minutes
- Production company: NOLA

Original release
- Network: TLC
- Release: January 29 – February 12, 2013

Starter Wives Confidential is an American reality television series on TLC. The series premiered on January 29, 2013 at 10pm ET/PT. Starter Wives Confidential follows the lives of seven women who had relationships with men prior to the wealth and stardom making them what they are today. It would later be canceled due to low ratings.

== Cast ==
- Cheryl Caruso: Caruso was married to Phillip Caruso and have two children together.
- Josie Harris: Harris is a previous girlfriend of Floyd Mayweather and have three children together.
- Liza Morales: Morales is a previous girlfriend of Lamar Odom and have three children together.
- Zakia Baum: Baum is a previous girlfriend of Jermaine "Maino" Coleman and have one son together.
- Shaniqua Tompkins: Tompkins is a previous girlfriend of Curtis "50 Cent" Jackson and have one son together.
- Monica Joseph-Taylor: Taylor was married to Funkmaster Flex and have two children together.
- Tashera Simmons: Simmons was married to Earl "DMX" Simmons and have four children together.

== Episodes ==
No.	Title	Original release date	U.S. viewers (millions)
1	"Let Go or Get Dragged"	January 29, 2013	678,00
Monica hosts a party due to her blog's anniversary but doesn't inform the ladies of her controversial guest list. Note: Lil' Kim makes a guest appearance in this episode.
2	"If You Can't Take the Heat"	February 5, 2013	399,000
After the drama from Monica's party, the ladies attempt to stay together and keep their friendships. Tashera learns new information about her painful past.
3	"Hip Hop Hoarding"	February 12, 2013	421,000
The ladies come together to fix past problems and deal with the aftermath of Hurricane Sandy.
4	"Road Trippin"	N/A	N/A
While on a road trip to Washington D.C., the women are worried about Josie. Note: This episode never aired due to the series being canceled. It has been uploaded to the series' official website.
