= Top Card =

American game show

- Genre: Game show
- Created by: Allen Reid; Mady Land
- Directed by: Ken Vincent
- Presented by: Jim Caldwell (1989–1991); Dan Miller (1991–1993) with Blake Pickett (1989–1991); Paige Brown (1991–1993)
- Announcer: Don Dashiell; Brad Staggs (substitute)
- Composers: Mike Johnson; Allen Reid
- No. of seasons: 4

Production
- Executive producers: Allen Reid; Mady Land; C. Paul Corbin for TNN
- Running time: 30 Minutes
- Production company: Reid/Land Productions

Original release
- Network: TNN
- Release: April 3, 1989 – March 26, 1993

Top Card is a game show that aired on TNN and produced by Reid-Land Productions, replacing TNN's original game show Fandango. The show aired from April 3, 1989 to March 26, 1993 and was based on the card game Blackjack.

Jim Caldwell was the original host of Top Card, with Blake Pickett serving as his hostess. The two remained until the beginning of the series' third season in 1991 and were replaced by Dan Miller and Paige Brown. The announcer for the show's entire run was Don Dashiell, with Brad Staggs substituting for several weeks in the third season.

Top Card was replaced the Monday following its cancellation by 10 Seconds, a music-based game show which was also hosted by Dan Miller.

== Gameplay ==
Three contestants, one usually a returning champion, competed in a question-and-answer game. Originally, the questions were varied as to their subjects, but by the third season they were strictly music based. The goal was to build a blackjack hand with a value as close to 21 as possible without going over ("busting").

=== Main game ===
Three rounds were played, with nine cards hidden behind categories on a three-by-three grid. The outer eight spots on the grid displayed specific categories while the one in the center was a wild card category which could be about anything.

Each question was asked as a toss-up, and buzzing in with a correct answer awarded the contestant a playing card that was behind the category. The contestant could then choose to take the card and its corresponding value or reject it in favor of the top card from an oversized (but otherwise regulation) deck of cards. Cards numbered two through ten were worth the face value in points, with kings, queens and jacks each worth ten. Unlike in actual blackjack, an ace could only be played for one point and not a choice between one or eleven.

In the first season, if a contestant chose to take the top card instead of the card in play, the card and category it was behind remained in play. Afterward, the card was taken off the board regardless.

If at any point during the round a contestant felt they had a high enough score to stop and not risk busting, they could elect to "freeze" and stop playing while the other contestant(s) continued the round. If one of the other two contestants passed the frozen contestant's score, that contestant was given the option to freeze and the first contestant returned to the game to try to top the other contestant's score.

Play in the first round continued until either of the following things happened:

- One contestant reached 21, automatically winning the round
- All three contestants had either busted or elected to freeze, with the highest score (not over 21) winning the round
- Two contestants busted, with the third contestant winning the round by default
- All of the categories had been played, with the highest score winning the round
- Time expired for the round, with the highest score winning the round

The contestant that won the round received a prize, which was theirs to keep regardless of the outcome. The winner of the first round advanced to the third and final round while the other two contestants played in the second round for the right to advance to play the first round winner. Initially, a wild card question was asked to determine control, but beginning in season two, the upper left category on the grid was played first. All the rules from before applied, with the winner being either the first to hit 21, avoid busting or have the highest score when either all of the categories were played or time was called.

The third round was called the "Championship Round" and played the same way as the second round, with the winner of this round declared the day's champion.

==== Changes after season one ====
The number of subjects was reduced to eight and the wild card category was replaced by a "Top Card question", which could only be played if it was the only remaining category. All questions were about music, with the majority of them country music-based. Also, the cards Ace through 10 were shuffled and placed behind each category but only appeared once. No duplicate cards were found on the board.

== Top Card Plus ==
The champion played the bonus round, called "Top Card Plus", for a chance to win a grand prize.

=== Season 1 ===
In the first season of Top Card, six grand prizes were available per episode. Three of these were typically cars, two consisted of merchandise such as a piano or fur coat, and one was a trip. The champion drew one of six cards at random to determine the grand prize at stake, after which five cards were drawn from the top of the oversized deck to determine his/her bankroll for the round. Card values were multiplied by $100 and added together, for a maximum potential starting total of $5,000.

Eight of the nine spaces on the board now displayed smaller prizes and their prices, rounded off to the nearest multiple of $10. The center space held a wild card mystery prize with no displayed value. Each space also hid a card, one of which was a joker that the champion needed to avoid. They chose one prize at a time, whose price was deducted from the bankroll. If the card behind it was not the joker, they could either accept it or take the top card from the deck instead. If the revealed card would cause the champion to bust, they were given the top card by default. The champion could select the wild card prize at any time, but at the cost of their entire remaining bankroll.

The round ended as soon as the champion did any of the following:

- Reach 21 exactly: Win the grand prize and all smaller prizes chosen from the board.
- Bust/Find the joker: Forfeit all prizes.
- Choose to stop: Keep all chosen prizes.
- Fail to reach 21 after choosing the wild card or exhausting the bankroll: Keep all chosen prizes.

Champions continued to appear on the show until they either lost the main game or won a grand prize.

=== Seasons 2–4 ===
In the second through fourth seasons, the champion was shown several cars and picked one to play for.

The object was to reach 21 in four turns or less. This time, in order to claim a card, the champion had to correctly answer a question from one of the eight main game categories. Correctly answering a question won a prize that was revealed after the category selection and the champion was given a choice of either keeping the card behind that category or trading it for the top card as before. Answering a question incorrectly gave the contestant nothing.

Once again, the champion won the car and whatever prizes they had won by reaching 21. If the champion could not reach 21 in four turns, the round ended. If the contestant did not bust or find the joker, they kept whatever prizes won and returned on the next show.

=== Consolation game ===
If the joker was revealed on the first pick, the champion could still win a prize. The champion chose another prize/category and play continued, with the contestant still having the choice to either take the selected card or the top card. After that, each card in the deck was revealed one at a time until the contestant was in a position to bust, at which point they could decide to either stop and take $10 a point or continue. If the contestant reached 21, the contestant won the selected prize.
