= Miss U Much =

- Genre: Reality
- Presented by: Catherine Reitman
- Country of origin: United States
- Original language: English
- No. of seasons: 1
- No. of episodes: 8

Production
- Executive producers: Jeff Olde; Karla Hidalgo; Shelly Tatro
- Running time: 22 minutes

Original release
- Network: VH1
- Release: December 2, 2012 – August 30, 2013

Miss U Much is an American reality television series that airs on VH1 and debuted on July 19, 2013. It is hosted by Catherine Reitman, and provides viewers with updates on stars from the 1990s and early 2000s.

== Episodes ==
No.	Title	Original release date	Prod. code	U.S. viewers
1	"Episode 1"	December 2, 2012	101-30	345,000
2	"Episode 2"	July 19, 2013	102-30	198,000
3	"Episode 3"	July 26, 2013	103-30	320,000
4	"Episode 4"	August 2, 2013	104-30	251,000
5	"Episode 5"	August 9, 2013	105-30	181,000
6	"Episode 6"	August 16, 2013	106-30	103,000
7	"Episode 7"	August 23, 2013	107-30	219,000
8	"Episode 8"	August 30, 2013	108-30	209,000
