= Pete Rose: Hits & Mrs. =

American reality television series

- Genre: Reality
- Starring: Pete Rose; Kiana Kim
- Country of origin: United States
- No. of seasons: 1
- No. of episodes: 6

Production
- Executive producers: Kevin Lopez; Mark Ford
- Running time: 42 minutes
- Production company: Creature Films

Original release
- Network: TLC
- Release: January 13 – February 17, 2013

Pete Rose: Hits & Mrs. is an American reality television series on TLC that chronicled the lives of baseball player Pete Rose, his fiancée Kiana Kim, and Kim's two children, Cassie and Ashton. On July 18, 2012, TLC announced the series started production for a six-episode first season. Amy Winter, general manager of TLC, said "This series will open the door into a very modern family dynamic of trying to blend families when your kids are no longer children, and when your private life is in the public spotlight". The series debuted on January 13, 2013. After airing four episodes, it was stated that the last two episodes would be shelved until the 2013 baseball season started. Despite that statement, the final episodes aired on TLC's sister channel Destination America during a Sunday morning marathon and the network has no plans to air any reruns of the series, thus announcing its cancellation.

== Episodes ==
No.	Title	Original release date	U.S. viewers (millions)
1	"The Family Hustle"	January 13, 2013	0.78
2	"There's No Crying in Baseball"	January 13, 2013	0.52
3	"For Pete's Sake"	January 21, 2013	0.68
4	"Creature of Habit"	January 21, 2013	0.56
5	"Mr. Mom"	February 17, 2013	N/A
6	"Hit or Get off the Pot"	February 17, 2013	N/A
