= Off Pitch =

- Genre: Documentary
- Country of origin: United States
- Original language: English
- No. of seasons: 1
- No. of episodes: 8

Production
- Executive producers: Colleen Steward; Jeff Olde; Jill Holmes; Marilyn Wilson; Shannon Keenan Demers; Tim Hamilton; Tom Huffman
- Running time: 22 to 24 minutes
- Production company: Tremendous! Entertainment

Original release
- Network: VH1
- Release: April 17 – May 22, 2013

Off Pitch is an American reality documentary television series that debuted on VH1 on April 17, 2013. The series chronicles the Grand River Singers, a Glee-inspired adult community show choir located in La Crosse, Wisconsin.

== Cast ==
- Rob (age 43) – co-director and choreographer
- Tim (age 43) – co-founder and musical director
- Scott (age 26) – stage manager
- Greg (age 20)
- Marcia (age 24)
- Josh (age 27)
- Aubrey (age 28)
- Liv (age 20)
- Vanessa (age 20)
- Molly K. (age 21)
- Molly J. (age 23)
- Kayla (age 21)
- Nick (age 22)
- Jon (age 20)
- Drew (age 31)
- Malachi (age 23)
- Erin (age 33)
- Justin (age 21)
- Eric (age 22)
- Steven (age 24)
- Samantha (age 22)

== Episodes ==
No.	Title	Original release date	US viewers (millions)
1	"Grand River Singers"	April 17, 2013	0.15
2	"It's a Sing Off"	April 24, 2013	0.12
3	"Go Team Go"	May 1, 2013	0.08
4	"Just Around the Riverbend"	May 8, 2013	0.19
5	"Oh My Goodness"	May 15, 2013	0.11
6	"The Douchebag Jar"	May 15, 2013	0.10
7	"Polka Face"	May 22, 2013	0.13
8	"Top of the World"	May 22, 2013	0.15
