= 2013 in Dutch television =

This is a list of Dutch television related events from 2013.

== Events ==
- 15 February - 14-year-old Laura van Kaam wins the second series of The Voice Kids.
- 5 July - Haris Alagic wins the fifth series of X Factor.
- 20 December - Julia van der Toorn wins the fourth series of The Voice of Holland.
- 28 December - 9-year-old opera singer Amira Willighagen wins the sixth series of Holland's Got Talent.

== Television shows ==
=== 1950s ===
- NOS Journaal (1956–present)

=== 1970s ===
- Sesamstraat (1976–present)

=== 1980s ===
- Jeugdjournaal (1981–present)
- Het Klokhuis (1988–present)

=== 1990s ===
- Goede tijden, slechte tijden (1990–present)

=== 2000s ===
- X Factor (2006–present)
- Holland's Got Talent (2008–present)

=== 2010s ===
- The Voice of Holland (2010–present)

== Networks and services ==
=== Launches ===
Network	Type	Launch date	Notes	Source
Fox	Cable television	19 August		
100% NL TV	Cable television	1 October		

=== Conversions and rebrandings ===
Old network name	New network name	Type	Conversion Date	Notes	Source
Djazz	Stingray Djazz	Cable television	Unknown		
Film1 Family	Film1 Comedy & Kids	Cable television	Unknown		
Eredivisie Live	Fox Sports	Cable television	17 August		

=== Closures ===
Network	Type	End date	Notes	Sources
ESPN Classic	Cable television	1 August		

== See also ==
- 2013 in the Netherlands
