= Armed & Ready =

2013 American television series

- Genre: Adventure; Travel show
- Created by: Kevin Michael Connolly
- Directed by: Kelly Hefner
- Starring: Kevin Michael Connolly
- Country of origin: United States
- No. of seasons: 1
- No. of episodes: 6

Production
- Executive producers: Tom Capello; Kelly Hefner; David E. Gerber
- Running time: 43 minutes

Original release
- Network: Travel Channel
- Release: February 26 – March 19, 2013

Armed & Ready is an American adventure reality show that airs on the Travel Channel. It follows the exploits of its host, Kevin Michael Connolly, who was born without legs, as he travels around the United States pursuing various challenges, such as learning how to street luge, joust, or move around in zero gravity. Connolly said that the challenges were his ideas, and the idea was to show a legless man do actions thought impossible for him.

== Episodes ==
No.	Title	Original release date
1	"Death Defying Cliff Dive"	February 26, 2013
The debut episode finds Kevin traveling to the Big Island of Hawaii, where he tries sports such as mountainboarding, surfing, ziplining, and cliff-diving.
2	"Legless Lumberjack"	February 26, 2013
3	"Legless Army of One"	March 5, 2013
4	"Full Body Jousting"	March 12, 2013
5	"Luge Your Mind"	March 17, 2013
6	"Legless in Space"	March 19, 2013
