= Reality Racing =

Reality Racing was a competition-based reality television show that debuted May 19, 2007 on Spike TV. The show was described by one journalist as "NASCAR meets American Idol," but failed to achieve its first season advertising sales performance targets and was cancelled. The show aired alongside the shows Trucks! and Bullrun, and was an essential component of Spike's Powerblock.
