= Urban Tarzan =

American television series

Urban Tarzan is a television series that aired on Spike. The show features John Brennan and his career as an animal wrangler for Steve Irwin, along with his assistant Jay Cassidy. The show was created by Lorraine Yarde and Mark Basile The series aired for ten episodes.
