= Washington Heights (TV series) =

- Genre: Docu-reality
- Country of origin: United States
- Original language: English
- No. of seasons: 1
- No. of episodes: 11

Production
- Executive producers: Beck Hickey; Cheryl Horner Sirulnick; Chris Linn; Christy Spitzer; Craig Sloane; George McTeague; Janay Dutton; Jim Czarnecki; Patrick Reardon; Shane Tilston; Shannon Fitzgerald
- Running time: 40 to 43 minutes
- Production company: Gigantic! Productions

Original release
- Network: MTV
- Release: January 9 – March 13, 2013

Washington Heights is an American docu-reality television series on MTV. The series debuted on January 9, 2013, and concluded on March 13, 2013.

== Premise ==
The series follows the lives of nine primarily Dominican young adults who live in Washington Heights. Each one of them has their own individuality, and dreams they wish to pursue but they all have to face personal issues and obstacles along the way while living in the neighborhood that has brought them together like family.

== Cast ==
- JP Johnathan Perez (a.k.a. Audubon)
- Reyna Saldana
- Frankie Reese
- Ludwin Federo
- Jimmy Caceres
- Rico Rasuk
- Fred Rasuk
- Taylor Howell
- Eliza Jefferson

== Ratings ==
The show ratings were poor. The show premiered with 0.4 adults 18-49 rating and less than 756,000 viewers, which is significantly lower than the premiere of MTV's former programming The Inbetweeners.
