= Weed Country =

- Genre: Docudrama
- Country of origin: United States
- No. of seasons: 1
- No. of episodes: 6

Production
- Executive producers: Bill Pruitt; Eli Holzman; John Moffet; Stephen Lambert; Steve Mellon
- Running time: 40 to 44 minutes
- Production company: All3Media America

Original release
- Network: Discovery Channel
- Release: February 20 – March 27, 2013

Related
- Pot Cops

Weed Country is an American reality television series that aired on the Discovery Channel. The series premiered on February 20, 2013, during Discovery Channel's programming block titled "Weed Wednesdays". The series followed dealers, growers and patients of the marijuana trade located within the Emerald Triangle, along with the enforcers of the law at the Siskiyou County Sheriff's office.

== Cast ==
- Mike Boutin, farmer
- Tawni Boutin, farmer and wife of Mike Boutin
- Matt Shotwell, a.k.a. Matt Greenwell, owner of Greenwell's Dispensary
- Skweeze, Vallejo native and driver of the hooptie car for Matt Greenwell
- Nathaniel Morris, cannabis activist and scientist
- B.E. Smith, Aaron Smith, cannabis activist
- Lieutenant Matt Thomson
- Siskiyou County Sheriff Jon E. Lopey
- Sergeant Mike Gilley

== Episodes ==
No.	Title	Original release date	U.S. viewers (millions)
1	"Welcome to the Garden"	February 20, 2013	1.12
2	"Smugglers' Blues"	February 27, 2013	1.07
3	"Rippers"	March 6, 2013	1.07
4	"Unarmed and Dangerous"	March 13, 2013	1.10
5	"Evil Around The Corner"	March 20, 2013	0.93
6	"Harvest Hell"	March 27, 2013	0.95

== Criticism ==
Much like the Discovery Channel series Moonshiners, Weed Country was criticized as a scripted television show promoted as an unscripted show.

Matt Shotwell, the owner of Greenwell's Dispensary, faced criminal charges in connection with the raid and closure of the dispensary in Vallejo, California; charges against him were dismissed in 2013.
