= The Sisterhood (TV series) =

- Christina Murray, DeLana Rutherford, Tara Lewis, Ivy Couch, and Domonique Scott (from left)
- Genre: Documentary
- Opening theme: "My Sister" by Jingle Punks
- Country of origin: United States
- No. of seasons: 1
- No. of episodes: 8

Production
- Executive producers: Glenda Hersh; Steven Weinstock
- Running time: 40 to 43 minutes (excluding commercials)
- Production company: True Entertainment

Original release
- Network: TLC
- Release: January 1 – February 12, 2013

The Sisterhood is an American reality documentary television series on TLC. The series debuted on January 1, 2013.

== Premise ==
The series follows the lives of several preacher's wives as they handle their daily home life as well as managing their churches and businesses.

== Cast ==
- Domonique Scott
- Tara Lewis
- Ivy Couch
- Christina Murray
- DeLana Rutherford

== Episodes ==
No.	Title	Original release date	U.S. viewers (millions)
1	"Thou Shalt Not Cross a First Lady"	January 1, 2013	0.958
Pastor Brian and his wife, Tara, just recently moved to Atlanta and introduce themselves to the local church community. Tara announces news that doesn't sit well with her fellow preachers' wives.
2	"Thou Shalt Not Jump to Judgement"	January 8, 2013	0.655
Since Tara left the group on a sour note, she attempts to reintroduce herself to Ivy and Dominique. Tara begins the process of planning her son's Bar Mitzvah. Dominique leaves everyone in shock after she reveals certain information.
3	"Thou Shalt Not Walk Out on Your Wife"	January 13, 2013	0.635
Ivy is in disbelief when she receives word of some forthcoming news. The Lewises' are interested in televangelism for their church but Brian is unable to equally share the main hosting position with Tara.
4	"Thou Shalt Not Condemn Your Friend"	January 22, 2013	0.579
DeLana and Domonique's conversation leads into a battle, and drama ensues. Wanting to introduce a healthier lifestyle to the ladies, Tara takes the group out for an extreme workout session but Dominique just doesn't seem to agree with fitness.
5	"Thou Shalt Not Feud at a Fundraiser"	January 29, 2013	0.429
Christina invites some of the ladies to her church event, but Tara and Domonique bring the mood down with their never ending drama. Tara and Brian attempt to improve their bond with Brian's father, whom they haven't seen in 16 years, by inviting him to their son's Bar Mitzvah.
6	"Thou Shalt Not Brawl at a Bar Mitzvah"	February 5, 2013	0.537
Domonique and Delana continue their fighting at Tara's son's Christian Bar Mitzvah. The ladies are excited to depart for their trip to exotic Miami, Florida.
7	"Thou Shalt Not Cause Mayhem in Miami"	February 12, 2013	0.515
While enjoying their time in the sun, Domonique discusses her past with the ladies and hopes for closure. Tara creates an altercation, which jeopardizes her friendship with the ladies.
8	"Thou Shall Extend an Olive Branch"	February 12, 2013	0.597
After returning to the Atlanta, Ivy, Christina and Domonique debate whether they continue being friends with Tara. Ivy tells some of the ladies a secret. Domonique gets ready for a memorable day.
