= L.A. Frock Stars =

- Country of origin: United States
- Original language: English
- No. of seasons: 2
- No. of episodes: 12

Production
- Executive producers: Charles Poe; David Royle (producer); Judith Curran
- Production locations: Los Angeles, California
- Running time: 26 minutes (season 1); 46 minutes (season 2)
- Production companies: BBC Worldwide; NHNZ; Smithsonian Channel

Original release
- Network: Smithsonian Channel
- Release: March 7, 2013 – 2015

L.A. Frock Stars is a documentary television series and reality show released on the Smithsonian Networks. The show stars Doris Raymond, owner of Los Angeles-based high-end vintage clothing boutique "The Way We Wore". The first season was released in early 2013, and the second season was released in 2015. The episodes follow the story of Raymond and Sarah Bergman, Kyle Edward Blackmon, Jascmeen Busch, Shelly Reiko Lynn as they shop at estate sales and auctions, and interact with celebrities and celebrity stylists shopping in the store.

== Reception ==
Calling the show an "engaging series", The New York Times television critic Neil Genzlinger said of the first season, "The staff members are amusing without seeming as if they are playing to the cameras." In a review of the second season, Genzlinger called it "a mix of history and Hollywood glamour that is still a guilty pleasure but makes you feel a little smarter for having watched it".
