= Car Lot Rescue =

American reality documentary television series

- Genre: Documentary
- Created by: Vem Miller
- Starring: Tom Stuker
- Country of origin: United States
- No. of seasons: 1
- No. of episodes: 8

Production
- Executive producers: Ben Silverman; Craig Armstrong; Jimmy Fox; Rick Ringbakk; Vem Miller
- Running time: 40–43 minutes
- Production companies: 5x5 Media; Electus; Sweatshop Media

Original release
- Network: Spike
- Release: February 10 – March 31, 2013

Car Lot Rescue is an American reality documentary television series that aired for eight episodes on Spike. The series premiered on February 10, 2013.

The series' title was changed many times through production. It was first named Car Boss, which was later changed to Car Lot Cowboy and was officially announced with its final name on December 11, 2012.

== Premise ==
The series followed auto dealership "doctor" Tom Stuker as he traveled across the United States and assisted failing establishments to reach new potentials.

== Episodes ==
No.	Title	Original release date
1	"Fight Club"	February 10, 2013
Tom assists a dealership that's located in a rough neighborhood.
2	"Worst Little Car Lot in Florida"	February 17, 2013
Tom helps Micco Motors rise from their F rating on the Better Business Bureau and starts by giving the owner's two sons a pep talk. (Note: by the time this episode has aired, Micco Motors has since closed down.)
3	"Outta Sight, Outta Business"	February 24, 2013
Tom heads to New Jersey to help a dealership get more customers but the staff are unwilling to assist.
4	"Car Lot Cavemen"	March 3, 2013
Tom attempts to help a dealership that's staffed with models who don't have any knowledge about cars.
5	"The Battle of Route 23"	March 10, 2013
Tom takes a car for a test drive but things turn bad when the car starts to fall apart and the sales manager refuses to cooperate.
6	"After the Storm"	March 17, 2013
Tom works with sales managers that take customers from their co-workers.
7	"No More Mr. Nice Guy"	March 24, 2013
Tom goes to a small town dealership in order to help an owner who gives her own money for customers to purchase cars and is unsure what to do when she never gets paid back.
8	"Dark Ages Dealership"	March 31, 2013
A dealership is struggling without any new technology and Stuker comes to their aide.
