= Women's Image Network Awards =

American award ceremony focused on women's contributions to TV and film

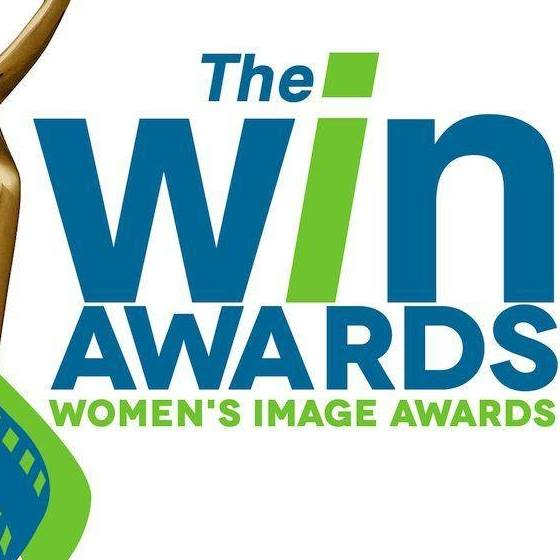
- Awarded for: Positive portrayals of women in film and television
- Country: United States
- Formerly called: The WIN Awards
- Website: thewinawards.com

Television/radio coverage
- Produced by: Women's Image Network; Phyllis Stuart

Women's Image Network (WIN) is an organization that creates, applauds and shares women's stories. Since 1993, Women's Image Network has been promoting gender parity by producing The Women's Image Awards, which celebrate outstanding film and television that dispels stereotypes. The Women's Image Awards are produced just before the Hollywood awards season.

WIN was founded in 1993 by actress, writer and filmmaker Phyllis Stuart.

== The WIN Awards 1993 ==
In 1993, WIN held its first awards ceremony, honoring Tichi Wilkerson Kassel with a Lifetime Achievement Award. Tichi was the first female publisher of The Hollywood Reporter and co-founder of Women in Film. Her friend Charles Champlin (a former Los Angeles Times arts editor and film critic) presented her award. Film producer Laura Ziskin (Spider-Man) was honored that same year, and her former boss, producer Jon Peters, presented her Woman of The Year tribute.

== The WIN Awards 1994 ==
In 1994 producer Phyllis Stuart created and executive-produced the ABC Primetime Special "Fifty Years of Funny Females" starring John Ritter, Annie Potts, Paula Poundstone, Debbie Allen and Pam Stone. This clip show aired twice on ABC and again on Lifetime Television.

== The WIN Awards 1999 ==
For four years, the WIN Awards coincided with the WIN Femme Film Festival which was created to support emerging and/or first-time filmmakers.

The WIN Femme Film Festival programmed independently produced short films, documentary feature films, and full-length feature films that told a woman's story, had a female protagonist, and were created either by male or female artists. Best documentary went to Paolo di Florio for her film Speaking in Strings. WIN created this festival to help filmmakers find distribution, get agents and win other awards. Speaking in Strings went on to receive an Academy Award nomination. Director John Putch won best feature with Valerie Flake starring Susan Traylor, who also garnered a Spirit Award for best actress.

== The WIN Awards 2000 ==
Actress Lauren Bacall accepted WIN's first Living Legend tribute. New Zealand film director Jane Campion was also honored, and her Piano film star Sam Neill accepted her tribute on her behalf.

== The WIN Awards 2001 ==
Both Lynn Redgrave (Living Legend) and Pierce Brosnan (Humanitarian) were honorees. A few presenters were LisaGay Hamilton, Gavin Scott, and Allana Ubach.

The WIN Awards 2001 winners

- Drama Series - Gilmore Girls, "Rory's Dance"
- Drama Series Actress - Dana Delany, Family Law, "Safe At Home"
- Drama Series Actor - Jared Padalecki, Gilmore Girls, "Rory's Dance"
- Drama Series Writer - Amy Sherman-Palladino, Gilmore Girls, "Rory's Dance"
- Drama Series Directior - Andrew J. Robinson Judging Amy, "Treachery of Compromise"
- Comedy Series - Ally McBeal – "The Last Virgin"
- Comedy Series Actress - Cynthia Nixon, Sex and the City, "My Motherboard, My Self"
- Comedy Series Actor - Robert Downey Jr., Ally McBeal, "The Last Virgin"
- Comedy Series Writer - David E. Kelley, Ally McBeal, "Reason to Believe"
- Comedy Series Director - Lesli Linka Glatter, Gilmore Girls, "Rory's Dance"
- Made For Television Movie / Mini-Series - A House Divided (Showtime)
- Made For Television Movie / Mini-Series Actress - Lisa Gay Hamilton, A House Divided (Showtime)
- Made For Television Movie / Mini-Series Actor - Michael Byrne, The Mists of Avalon (Turner Network Television)
- Writer Made For Television Movie / Mini-Series - Gavin Scott, The Mists of Avalon (Turner Network Television)
- Director Made For Television Movie / Mini-Series - Uli Edell, The Mists of Avalon (Turner Network Television)
- TV Daytime Series - The Zeta Project, "The Accomplice"
- Actress TV Daytime Series - Julie Nathanson, The Zeta Project, "The Accomplice"
- Reality Series - Celebrity Profile: Sarah Ferguson (E! Entertainment)
- News Series - NBC News: The Odyssey Producer: Esther Zucker, Correspondent: Dennis Murphy
- Feature Film - Nurse Betty (USA FILMS)
- Actress Feature Film - Reese Witherspoon Legally Blonde (MGM)
- Actor Feature Film - Luke Wilson, Legally Blonde (MGM)
- Writer Feature Film - Karen McCullah Lutz, Kirsten Smith Legally Blonde (MGM)
- Director Feature Film - Neil LaBute Nurse Betty (USA Films)

== The WIN Awards 2002 ==
Actress Lily Tomlin was honored as a Lifetime Achievement honoree. In lieu of a tribute video, Tomlin was applauded with 'Lily Love Letters' sent from famous friends and serenaded by director David O. Russell. Ruth Buzzi of Laugh In presented.

Presenters included Laraine Newman, Kathy Najimy, Ruth Buzzi, Doris Roberts, Melissa Joan Hart, Anne-Marie Johnson, Arthur Hiller, Dava Savel, Sally Kirkland and Alex Ben Block.

Winners

- Drama Series - Alias Creator J. J. Abrams
- Actress Drama Series - Jennifer Garner, Alias
- Actor Drama Series - Victor Garber Alias
- Comedy Series - The Simpsons
- Actress Comedy Series - Kathy Najimy King of the Hill
- Children's Programming - Justice League producers Bruce Timm, Glen Murakami, Rich Fogel, James Tucker
- Actress Animated Series - Julie Nathanson The Zeta Project
- Actor Animated Series - Diedrich Bader The Zeta Project
- Documentary Films - Beneath The Veil Producer and Journalist Saira Shah & Sheryl Crow: Behind The Music Producers, Paul Gallagher, Justin Sturken, Mark Ford, Andrea Buchanan, Jill Modabber
- News - Good Morning America-LA Dodgers Fan Producer Bill Cunningham
- Feature Film - Amélie
- Actor Feature Film - Ryan Phillippe
- Actress Feature Film - Audrey Tautou Amélie

The WIN Awards were part of the closing night of the final WinFemme Film Festival. The three filmmaker Audience Award winners were: (Feature Film), "Controlled Chaos", director, Azita Zendel, (Documentary Feature) Searching For Paradise, director, Binnur Karaevli and (Short Film), Katherine, director, Mary Louise Stoughton.

== The WIN Awards 2003 ==
Hosted by Will Sasso and Sara Rue, producer Lauren Shuler Donner received a Lifetime Achievement Award from presenter Rachel Weisz.

Held at the historic Culver City Studios, director Vicky Jensen (Shrek) was honored with WIN's first Kiera Chaplin Limelight directing award. British model and actress Kiera Chaplin is the granddaughter of Charlie Chaplin and great-granddaughter of playwright Eugene O'Neill.

Winners

- Drama Series - Crossing Jordan "Cruel and Unusual" (NBC)
- Actress Drama Series - Sarah Ramos American Dreams "Act of Contrition"
- Actor Drama Series - Miguel Ferrer Crossing Jordan "Cruel and Unusual"
- Comedy Series - Less than Perfect "Ice Cream With Lydia" (Touchstone Television)
- Actress Comedy Series - Sara Rue Less than Perfect "Ice Cream With Lydia"
- Actor Comedy Series - Eric Roberts Less than Perfect "Ice Cream With Lydia"
- Reality Series - Controversy: The Pill (Country Music Television)
- Animation Series - Kim Possible "Crush" (Walt Disney TV Animation)
- Actress Animation Series - Kathy Najimy King of the Hill "Queasy Rider"
- Actor Animation Series - Dan Castellaneta The Simpsons "'Scuse Me While I Miss the Sky"
- News Series - ABC NEWS: 20/20 "The Osbournes" (ABC)
- Film or Show Directed By a Woman - Pam Veasey The District "Blood Lines"
- Made For Television Movie / Mini-Series - Normal (HBO)
- Actress Made For Television Movie / Mini-Series - Romola Garai I Capture the Castle
- Actor Feature Film - Tom Wilkinson Normal (HBO)

== The WIN Awards 2004 ==
WIN added advertising awards with advertising industry artists judges like Charlotte Moore, Sally Hogshead, Amee Shah, Ellen Steinberg, Joyce King Thomas, Liz Paradise (Jury Chair) and David Oakley.

Winners

- Animation Series - The Fairly OddParents 'Miss Dimmsdale', Nickelodeon
- Actor Animation Series - Mike Judge King of the Hill "Ceci N'est Pas Une"
- Actress Animation Series - Melissa Disney As Told by Ginger "No Turning Back"
- Comedy Series - Life with Bonnie "The Merry Ole Land of Oz",
- Comedy Series Actor - Zachary Levi, Less Than Perfect "Roomies,"
- Comedy Series Actress - Sarah Jessica Parker Sex and the City "An American Girl in Paris (Part Deux)"
- Made For Television Movie / Mini-Series - Iron Jawed Angels Spring Creek Productions/HBO Films
- Actor Made For Television Movie / Mini-Series - Patrick Dempsey Iron Jawed Angels
- Actress Made For Television Movie / Mini-Series - Mary-Louise Parker Angels in America
- Documentary Film - The Day I Will Never Forget Reel Life, Producer: Kim Longinotto
- News Series ABC Primetime Thursday Charlize Theron Correspondent, Diane Sawyer
- Drama Series - Carnivàle "Insomnia" (HBO)
- Actor Drama Series - Miguel Ferrer Crossing Jordan "Second Chances"
- Actress Drama Series - Adrienne Barbeau Carnivàle "Day of the Dead"
- Reality Series - E! True Hollywood Story Producers: William Neal, Wendy Quinn
- Film or TV Show Directed By a Woman - Shona Auerbach Dear Frankie
- Feature Film - Something's Gotta Give (Waverly Films, Columbia Pictures)
- Actor Feature Film - Jack Nicholson Something's Gotta Give
- Actress Feature Film - Cate Blanchett The Missing

== The WIN Awards 2005 ==
Kathy Griffin hosted The WIN Awards 2005. Christine Lahti, Andrea Parker, Amy Davidson, Lainie Kazan, Gurinder Chadha, Dan Wieden, Lu Chekowsky, Maureen Shirreff, Jennifer Hall, Lindsay Crouse and Danielle Panabaker were among the presenters.

Gurinder Chadha picked up the Chaplin Limelight Award for directing presented by Charlie Chaplin's granddaughter Kiera Chaplin.

Winners

- Animation Series - Avatar: The Last Airbender "Imprisoned" (Nickelodeon) Director: Dave Filoni, Writer: Matt Hubbard, Producers: Michael Dante DiMartino, Bryan Konietzko, Aaron Ehaz
- Actress in Animation Series - Cheryl Chase All Grown Up! ""Lucky 13"
- Actor in Animation Series - Chad Doreck My Life as a Teenage Robot ""Future Shock/Humiliation 101""
- Comedy Series - 8 Simple Rules "School Nurse"
- Actress Comedy Series - Andrea Parker Less Than Perfect "Ignoring Lydia"
- Actor Comedy Series - Brad Garrett Everybody Loves Raymond ""Sister-In-Law"
- Made For TV Movies / Mini Series - Lackawanna Blues
- Actress Made For TV Movies / Mini Series - Christine Lahti Revenge of the Middle-Aged Woman
- Actor Made For TV Movies / Mini Series - Ed Harris Empire Falls
- Documentary Film - Ferry Tales
- News Series - Primetime Live: Talking to Animals:Temple Grandin
- Drama Series - LAS VEGAS "Blood is Thicke"
- Actress Drama Series - Molly Parker Deadwood "Requiem For a Gleet"
- Actor Drama Series - Hugh Laurie House "Damned If You Do"
- Reality Series - Dr. Phil ""Takes on Abusers"
- Film Directed By A Woman - Lindsay Crystal My Uncle Berns
- Television Produced By A Woman - Linda Ellerbee Inside TV Land: Primetime Politics
- Feature Film - Flight Plan (Buena Vista Pictures)
- Actress Feature Film - Claire Danes Shopgirl
- Actor Feature Film - Jake Gyllenhaal Proof

== The WIN Awards 2006 ==
Held at UCLA, Senator Barbara Boxer accepted The Woman of The Year Honor. British actress Helen Mirren won two WIN tributes which actress Katie Holmes accepted on her behalf. Harry Shearer hosted; American Idol Ace Young performed.

Winners

- Made for Television Movie / Mini-Series - Mrs. Harris
- Actress Mini-Series or Made For Television Movie - Helen Mirren Elizabeth I
- Actor Mini-Series or Made For Television Movie - Robert Carlyle Human Trafficking
- Comedy Series - The Office
- Actress Comedy Series - Jenna Fischer The Office
- Actor Comedy Series - Clark Gregg The New Adventures of Old Christine
- Documentary Film - Born into Brothels
- Film or Show Produced By a Woman - Cheryl Hines, Christen Sussin, Carrie Aizley Campus Ladies
- Film or Show Directed By a Woman - Phyllis Nagy Mrs. Harris
- Reality Series - Mo'Nique's Fat Chance
- Drama Series - The Closer
- Actress Drama Series - Mary McDonnell Battlestar Galactica
- Actor Drama Series - Bill Paxton Big Love
- Feature Film - Water
- Actress Feature Film - Helen Mirren The Queen
- Actor Feature Film - Ralph Fiennes The Constant Gardener

== The WIN Awards 2007 ==
Held at The Pacific Design Center, Diane Ladd accepted her Lifetime Achievement Award. Frances Fisher presented.

- Angelina Jolie accepted (via a pre-taped speech) best actress in a feature film award for A Mighty Heart.
- Army Wives star Sally Pressman and Tracee Ellis Ross co-hosted.
- Honorees Janet Kestin and Nancy Vonk, Co-Chief Creatives, Ogilvy-Toronto accepted an inaugural Harriett Abbott Advertising Award.

Winners:

- Made For Television Movie / Mini-Series - A Girl Like Me: The Gwen Araujo Story
- Actress Made For Television Movie / Mini-Series - Andrea Bowen, Girl, Positive
- Actor Made For Television Movie / Mini-Series - Wendell Pierce, Life Support
- Comedy Series - Ugly Betty "I'm Coming Out"
- Actress Comedy Series - Ashley Jensen, Extras
- Actor Comedy Series - Alec Baldwin, 30 Rock "Hardball"
- Documentary Film - Thin
- Film or Show Produced by a Woman - Shauna Robertson, Knocked Up
- Film or Show Directed by a Woman - Rory Kennedy, Ghosts of Abu Ghraib
- Actress Animation Series - Kathy Najimy, King of the Hill
- Reality Series - Kimora: Life in the Fab Lane
- Drama Series - Army Wives "A Tribe Is Born"
- Actress Drama Series - Connie Britton, Friday Night Lights
- Actor Drama Series - Taylor Kitsch, Friday Night Lights
- Actress Feature Film - Angelina Jolie, A Mighty Heart
- Actor Feature Film - Seth Rogen, Knocked Up
- Feature Film - A Mighty Heart

== The WIN Awards 2008 ==
WIN honored Cloris Leachman with its Living Legend Tribute and added interactive awards (video games) for the first time. WIN honored Interactive Living Legend Mary Dolaher. Patty Smyth and her band Scandal performed. Comic Judy Tenuta hosted and Tig Notaro also performed.

Presenters:Timothy Bottoms, Rick Overton, Hannah Simone, Bob Carrigan, John Savage, Sean Young, Diane English, Annie Wersching, Keith David, Eric Roberts.

The WIN Awards 2008 Winners

- Outstanding Made for Television Movie - Wisegal
- Actress Made for Television Movie / Mini-Series - Kathleen Robertson, Tin Man
- Comedy Series - The New Adventures of Old Christine "Beauty Is Only Spanx Deep"
- Actress Comedy Series - Julia Louis-Dreyfus, The New Adventures of Old Christine
- Documentary Film - Autism: The Musical
- Interactive (Video Game) - Tomb Raider: Underworld
- Outstanding Show or Film Produced By a Woman - Sheila Griffiths, Real Time with Bill Maher
- Film or Show Directed By a Woman - Lisa Jackson, The Greatest Silence: Rape in the Congo
- Reality Series - High School Confidential
- Drama Series - Private Practice
- Actress Drama Series - Dianne Wiest, In Treatment
- Feature Film - The Women
- Actress Feature Film Meryl Streep, Mamma Mia!

== The WIN Awards 2009 ==
The Career Achievement Honoree was The Hollywood Reporter editor Elizabeth Guider.

Winners

- Mini-Series / Made for Television Movie - Grey Gardens (HBO)
- Actress Made for Television Movie / Mini-Series - Marcia Gay Harden, The Courageous Heart of Irena Sendler
- Film Or Show Directed By A Woman - Anne Fletcher, The Proposal
- Documentary Film - Kick Like A Girl (HBO)
- Reality Series - Ruby (Style)
- Interactive (Video Game) - The Sims 3 (Electronic Arts)
- Drama Series - Medium "Then...and Again" (CBS/NBC)
- Actress Drama Series - Glenn Close Damages
- Feature Film - Whip It (Fox Searchlight)
- Actress Feature Film - Sandra Bullock The Proposal
- Best of Fest Short Film Award - Inside Director, Tracie Laymon
- Best of Fest Documentary Film Award - Women Behind The Camera Director: Alexis Krasilovsky
- Best of Fest Feature Film Award - Leftovers Director: Robin Nations

== The WIN Awards 2010 ==
This was a big year for the WIN awards as WIN created two new Lifetime Achievement awards. The recipients were Suzanne Roberts and Dame Elizabeth Taylor. Elizabeth Taylor's friend Mickey Rooney accepted the "Living Legend" award to celebrate Taylor's lifetime work in Hollywood and her charity work advancing HIV/AIDS activism.

The 2010 WIN Awards also honored Suzanne Roberts for her many career achievements. Her sons, Douglas Roberts and Brian L. Roberts (chairman of Comcast and NBC/Universal), and her husband, Ralph J. Roberts, presented the award.

Produced at The Broad Stage, Wendy Liebman hosted. Show presenters included: Carl Reiner, Lea Thompson, AJ Michalka, John Savage (actor), Sean Young, Sara Rue, Kahi Lee, and Sally Kirkland.

Winners:

- Television Produced By A Woman - Alexis Martin Woodall, Glee
- Film / Show Directed By A Woman - Elizabeth Allen, Ramona and Beezus
- Mini-Series / Made for Television Movie - Temple Grandin
- Film Produced By A Woman - Bonnie Arnold, How To Train Your Dragon
- Television Produced By A Woman - Alexis Martin Woodall, Glee
- Reality Series - Kimora: Life in the Fab Lane "Labor of Love"
- Comedy Series - Hung
- Actress Comedy Series - Cheryl Hines, Curb Your Enthusiasm "Seinfeld"
- Drama Series - Janet Tamaro, Rizzoli & Isles (Creator/Executive Producer)
- Actress Drama Series - Sasha Alexander, Rizzoli & Isles
- Film / Show Directed By A Woman - Elizabeth Allen, Ramona and Beezus
- Actress Feature Film - Helena Bonham Carter, Alice in Wonderland
- Feature Film - How To Train Your Dragon

== The Women's Image Awards 13 ==
- Hosted by Rick Overton; presenters included Malin Åkerman, Josh Stamberg, Sally Kirkland, Sharon Lawrence. Lili Haydn and her band performed.

Winners

- Made For TV Movie / Mini Series - Mildred Pierce (HBO)
- Actress Made for Television Movie - Diane Lane, Cinema Verite
- Documentary Film - Triangle: Remembering The Fire (Blowback Productions for HBO Documentary Films);
- Film / Show Directed By a Woman - Liz Garbus, Bobby Fischer Against The World (HBO)
- Film / Show Produced By a Woman - Bette Midler: The Showgirl Must Go On (HBO)
- Drama Series - Private Practice "Did You Hear What Happened to Charlotte King?" (ABC)
- Actress Drama Series - Anna Paquin, True Blood "She's Not There" (HBO)
- Comedy Series - Drop Dead Diva (Lifetime, Sony Pictures Television, Storyline Entertainment)
- Actress Comedy Series - Brooke Elliott, Drop Dead Diva
- Actress Feature Film - Vera Farmiga, Higher Ground
- Feature Film - Higher Ground (Sony Pictures Classics)

== The Women's Image Awards 14 ==
The WIN Humanitarian Honoree was producer, writer and arts patron Maria Arena Bell, which Lisa Kudrow presented. Show co-hosts were Melissa Peterman, Bruce Vilanch. The presenters included Beverly Johnson, Nadine Velazquez, and Ace Young. Singer, Diana DeGarmo, an American Idol winner, performed and presented. The WIN Awards 2012 were produced at The Paramount Theater on Paramount Studios.

Winners

- Comedy Series - Veep (HBO)
- Actress Comedy Series - Whitney Cummings, Whitney
- Made For Television Movie - Game Change
- Actress Made For Television Movie - Nicole Kidman, Hemingway & Gellhorn
- Film / Show Directed By A Woman - Susanna White, Boardwalk Empire "A Dangerous Maid"
- Documentary Film - About Face Supermodels Then and Now (HBO)
- Film / Show Written By A Woman - Raelle Tucker, True Blood "Whatever I am, You Made Me".
- Film / Show Produced By A Woman - Five
- Reality Series - Pit Bills and Parolees "Heart Broken" Animal Planet
- Drama Series - Smash (NBC)
- Actress Drama Series - Katharine McPhee, Smash
- Advertising Campaign - "Mean Stinks"

== The Women's Image Awards 15 ==
Grammy winner David Foster and Ruben Studdard performed at The WIN Awards. Cecilia DeMille Presley, Ambassador Swanee Hunt and Rosalind Jarrett were all honored, while Oprah and Kerry Washington were nominees, among others. Presenters included Anne Heche, Collette Burson, Kelsey Scott, Yolanda Foster, Kathy Connell (SAG AWARDS), Carlos Gomez and Kearann Giovanni.

The Women's Image Awards 2013 winners

- Actress TV Comedy Series - Zooey Deschanel: New Girl
- TV Show Directed By a Woman - Melanie Mayron: Army Wives
- TV Show Written By a Woman - Shonda Rhimes: Scandal
- TV Show Produced by a Woman - Cher: Dear Mom, Love Cher
- Actress TV Reality Series - Khloé Kardashian: Keeping Up With the Kardashians
- Actress TV Drama Series - Kerry Washington: Scandal
- Actress Feature Film - Lupita Nyong'o: Twelve Years a Slave
- Comedy TV Series - Modern Family (ABC)
- Documentary Film - Makers: Women Who Make America (WETA)
- Reality TV Series - Project Runway (Lifetime)
- Drama TV Series - Mad Men (AMC)

== The Women's Image Awards 16 ==
The show opened with a posthumous Joan Rivers tribute and featured guest comics Brittany Furlan and T. J. Miller who discussed and demonstrated how Joan influenced their comedy. WIN also honored filmmakers Lauren Paul and Molly Thompson, with its first Community Service tribute for having created Finding Kind, a documentary film about middle school female bullying.

Melissa Rivers, (who was also nominated as a producer) accepted a posthumous WIN award for her mother, Joan Rivers, who competed and won in the Outstanding Reality Series category for Fashion Police. Fashion designer Sophie Simmons collaborated with WIN to promote self-confidence with her Twitter campaign, 'Send Us Your Selfie' which advanced fashion as means for self-esteem. Baroness Kimberly Moore received its Humanitarian Honor. Writer Caprice Crane and comic Gary Shapiro, co-hosted.

2014 Women's Image Award Winners

- Documentary Film - Private Violence (HBO Documentary Films)
- Comedy Series - New Girl "All In" (FOX)
- Actress Comedy Series - Julia Louis-Dreyfus VEEP "Crate"
- Made For Television Movie / Mini-Series - American Horror Story: Coven (FX Networks)
- Actress Made For Television Movie / Mini-Series - Michelle Trachtenberg Killing Kennedy
- Reality Series - Cold Justice "Gone" (TNT)
- Actress Reality Series - Giuliana Rancic, Giuliana & Bill
- Drama Series - Scandal "Guess Who's Coming To Dinner" (ABC)
- Actress Drama Series - Lena Headey, Game of Thrones "The Lion And The Rose"
- Film Produced By a Woman - Mary Lisio, Teri Weinberg, Killing Kennedy
- Drama Series Produced By a Woman - Joanna Johnson, Jennifer Lopez, Elaine Goldsmith-Thomas, Christine Sacani The Fosters "I Do"
- Comedy Series Produced By a Woman - Lisa Bacon, Melissa Rivers Fashion Police "September Issue"
- Comedy Series Directed By A Woman - Alisa Statman Modern Family "The Wedding Part 2"
- Drama Series Directed By A Woman - Chandra Wilson Grey's Anatomy "Do You Know"
- Drama Series Written By A Woman - Stacy McKee Grey's Anatomy "Do You Know"
- Comedy Series Written By A Woman - Liz Meriwether, Kay Cannon New Girl "Nerd"
- Feature Film - Wild
- Actress in a Feature Film - Reese Witherspoon Wild

== The Women's Image Awards 17 ==
The 17th Women's Image Awards ceremony was held at Royce Hall UCLA on February 10, 2016 and hosted by Carol Leifer.Philanthropist and activist Irena Medavoy and documentary filmmaker Abigail Disney both accepted Woman of the Year tributes.

The Women's Image Awards 17 Winners:

- Documentary Film - The Hunting Ground (RADiUS-TWC)
- Comedy Series - Girlfriends' Guide to Divorce (Bravo Media)
- Actress Comedy Series - Lisa Edelstein, Girlfriends' Guide to Divorce
- MFT Movie/Mini-Series - With This Ring (Lifetime)
- Actress MFT Movie/Mini-Series - Felicity Huffman, American Crime
- Reality Series - Funny Girls (Oxygen)
- Actress Reality Series - Navey Baker, Behind The Mask "All in the Family"
- Drama Series - Outlander "The Garrison Commander" (Starz)
- Actress Drama Series - Caitriona Balfe, Outlander "The Garrison Commander"
- Film Produced By a Woman - Keri Selig,The Secret Life of Marilyn Monroe
- TV Show Produced By a Woman - Marti Noxon, Sarah Gertrude Shapiro UnREAL
- Film Written By a Woman - Nikole Beckwith, Stockholm, Pennsylvania
- TV Show Written By a Woman - Toni Graphia, Outlander "The Devil's Mark"
- Film Directed By a Woman - Maya Forbes, Infinitely Polar Bear
- TV Show Directed By a Woman - Helen Shaver, Vikings "The Usurper"
- Feature Film - The Diary of a Teenage Girl (Sony Pictures Classics)
- Actress Feature Film - Lily Tomlin, Grandma

== The Women's Image Awards 18 ==
Courage Award honoree (posthumously): Carrie Fisher

Humanitarian Award honoree: Anne Archer

Unity Award honoree: Karen Sharpe-Kramer

Women's Image Award winners:

- Documentary Film - The Eagle Huntress
- Comedy Series - Crazy Ex-Girlfriend
- Actress Comedy Series - Lisa Edelstein, Girlfriends' Guide to Divorce
- Made For Television Movie/Miniseries - Flesh and Bone (STARZ)
- Actress Made For Television Movie/Miniseries - Jean Smart, Fargo
- Reality Series - I Am Jazz, (TLC)
- Actress Reality Series - The Bella Twins, Total Divas
- Drama Series - Outlander (Starz)
- Actress Drama Series - Rhea Seehorn, Better Call Saul "Switch"
- Film or Show Produced By a Woman - Jessica Goldberg, Michelle Lee, The Path
- Film or Show Written By a Woman
  - Film - Amy Fox (Screenplay by), Sarah Megan Thomas, Alysia Reiner, Amy Fox (Story by) Equity
  - Show - Lauren Houseman, Rachelle R. Williams Survivor's Remorse'
- Films and Shows Directed By a Woman
  - Film - Louise Osmond, Dark Horse'
  - Show - Helen Shaver, Vikings "Yol"
- Feature Film - JULIETA (Sony Pictures Classics)
- Actress Feature Film - Isabelle Huppert Elle

== 19th Women's Image Awards ==
- Made For Television Movie / Mini-Series - Surviving Compton: Dre, Suge & Michel'le: Sony Pictures Television, Lifetime
- Actress Made For Television Movie / Mini-Series - Michelle Fairley: The White Princess
- Comedy Series - Girlfriends' Guide to Divorce: Bravo
- Actress Comedy Series - Katy Mixon: American Housewife
- Film or Show Directed By a Woman - Kimberly Peirce: Six
- Film or Show Written By a Woman - Maria Melnik American Gods
- Film or Show Produced by a Woman - Natalie Chaidez: Queen of the South
- Reality Series - Pit Bulls & Parolees: Animal Planet
- Actress Reality Series - Lee Murphy: Sweet Home Alabama
- Documentary Film - Hungry: Logo TV
- Drama Series - Halt and Catch Fire: AMC Studios
- Actress Drama Series - Inbar Lavi: Imposters
- Feature Film - Maudie: Sony Pictures Classics
- Actress Feature Film - Melissa Leo: Novitiate: Sony Pictures Classics
- Foreign Language Film - The Divine Order: (Switzerland) Zeitgeist Films, Kino Lorber

== 20th Women's Image Awards ==
- Made For Television Movie / Limited Series - Little Women "Part 2"
- Actress Made For Television Movie / Limited Series - Maya Hawke, Little Women
- Comedy Series - The Bold Type "Feminist Army"
- Actress Comedy Series - Caitlin FitzGerald, Sweetbitter "Simone's"
- Show Written by A Woman - Tanya Saracho, Vida "Episode 6"
- Show Directed by A Woman - Millicent Shelton, Preacher "Coffin"
- Film Written By a Woman - Jane Anderson, The Wife
- Film Directed by A Woman - Rory Kennedy, Above And Beyond: NASA's Journey To Tomorrow
- Film Produced by a Woman - Leslie Urdang, The Seagull
- Show Produced by a Woman - Jane Root, One Strange Rock "Home"
- Reality Series - Citizen Rose
- Actress Reality Series - Nikki Bella, Total Bellas
- Documentary Film - What Haunts Us
- Drama Series - Scandal "Over A Cliff"
- Actress Drama Series - Rhea Seehorn, Better Call Saul "Breathe"
- Feature Film - On The Basis of Sex
- Lead Actress Feature Film - Glenn Close, The Wife
- Supporting Actress Feature Film - Regina Hall, The Hate U Give

== 21st Women's Image Awards ==
The Women's Image Awards 21 Winners

- Documentary Film - Free Solo (National Geographic)
- Comedy Series - Fleabag "Episode #2.1" (BBC Films)
- Actress Comedy Series - Rachel Brosnahan, The Marvelous Mrs. Maisel "Someday"
- Made For Television Movie/Limited-Series - Escaping the Madhouse: The Nellie Bly Story (Lifetime)
- Actress Made For Television Movie/Limited-Series -' Julianna Margulies, The Hot Zone 'Expendable
- Reality Series - Amanda To The Rescue "Amanda's Hitchhiking Hounds" (Animal Planet)
- Actress Reality Series - Amanda Giese, Amanda To The Rescue "Amanda's Hitchhiking Hounds"
- Drama Series - How To Get Away With Murder "He Betrayed Us Both"
- Actress Drama Series - Ashleigh Cummings, NOS4A2 "The Wraith"
- Film/Show Produced By a Woman
  - Film - Elizabeth Chai Vasarhelyi, Free Solo
  - Show - Jami O'Brien, Lauren Corrao, NOS4A2 "The Dark Tunnels"
- Film/Show Written By a Woman
  - Film - Laure de Clermont-Tonnerre, The Mustang
  - Show - Angela Kang, The Walking Dead "The Storm"
- Film/Show Directed By a Woman
  - Film - Kasi Lemmons, Harriet
  - Show - Sarah Adina Smith, Hanna
- Feature Film - Harriet (Focus Features)
- Actress Feature Film - Scarlett Johansson, Jojo Rabbit

== 22nd Women's Image Awards ==
The Women's Image Awards 22 Winners

- Documentary Film - The Cave (National Geographic)
- Comedy Series - The Bold Type "To Peg Or Not To Peg" (Freeform)
- Actress Comedy Series - TIED
  - Katie Stevens, The Bold Type " The Truth Will Set You Free"
  - Jane Levy, Zoey's Extraordinary Playlist "Zoey's Extraordinary Glitch"
- Made For Television Movie/Limited-Series - Patsy & Loretta (Lifetime)
- Actress Made For Television Movie/Limited-Series - Megan Hilty, Patsy & Loretta
- Reality Series - Dr. Oakley, Yukon Vet "Squawk Off" (NatGeo Wild)
- Drama Series - Outlander "Never My Love" (Starz)
- Film/Show Produced By a Woman - Hightown "Love You Like a Sister"
- Film/Show Written By a Woman - Samantha McIntyre, Zoey's Extraordinary Playlist "Zoey's Extraordinary Glitch"
- Feature Film - Nomadland (Searchlight Pictures)
- Actress Feature Film - Tilda Cobham-Hervey, I Am Woman

== 23rd Women's Image Awards ==
Honorees were Helen Shaver for its Living Legend recipient and JoJo Siwa for its inaugural Rising Musical Star recipient.

The Women's Image Awards 23 Nominees

- Documentary Film - Time
- Comedy Series - Run the World
- Actress Comedy Series - Bresha Webb, Run the World "Phenomenal Women"
- Made For Television Movie/Limited-Series - Mrs. America
- Actress Made For Television Movie/Limited-Series - Danielle Brooks, Robin Roberts Presents: Mahalia
- Reality Series - Impact With Gal Gadot "Ice Breakers"
- Actress Reality Series - Bindi Irwin, Crikey! It's a Baby
- Actress Drama Series - TIED
  - Brandee Evans, P-Valley "Belly"
  - Rebecca Breeds, Clarice "The Silence is Over"
- Show Produced By a Woman - Courtney A. Kemp, Power Book II: Ghost "The Stranger"
- Film Produced By a Woman - Cecilia Peck, Inbal B. Lessner, India Oxenberg, Seduced: Inside the NXIVM Cult
- Film / Show Written By a Woman - Anja Marquardt, The Girlfriend Experience "Integration"
- Show Directed By a Woman - Mandy Moore, Zoey's Extraordinary Playlist "Zoey's Extraordinary Double Date"
- Film Directed By a Woman - Julia Hart, I'm Your Woman
- Animated Program - Santiago of the Seas "The Legend of Capitán Calavera"
- Actress Animated Program - Dawnn Lewis, Star Trek: Lower Decks
- Feature Film - Black Widow
- Actress Feature Film - Jessica Chastain, The Eyes of Tammy Faye

== The Women's Image Awards 24 ==
This show was hosted by comedian and actress Cathy Ladman.

The Women's Image Awards 24 Winners & Nominees:

- Documentary Film - Introducing, Selma Blair
- Comedy Series - Shining Vale
- Actress, Comedy Series - Courteney Cox, Shining Vale "Chapter 8: We Are Phelps"
- Made for Television Movie/Limited-Series - 1883
- Actress, Made for Television Movie/Limited-Series - Isabel May, 1883 "The Weep of Surrender"
- Reality Series - Why Not Us: Southern Dance "It's Showtime, Boo"
- Drama Series - The Cleaning Lady "TNT"
- Actress, Drama Series - Shannon Thornton, P-Valley "White Knights"
- Show Producers - Nikki Toscano, The Offer
- Drama Show Writers - Rebecca Cutter, Hightown "Great White"
- Comedy Show Writer - Julieanne Smolinski, Home Economics "Camping Tent, $39.99"
- Scripted Show Director - Monica Raymund, Hightown "Fresh as a Daisy"
- Non-Fiction Show Director - Kristen Lappas, Dream On
- Animated Series - HouseBroken "Who's a Bad Girl? Part 2"
- Actress, Animated Series - Lisa Kudrow HouseBroken "Who's a Bad Girl? Part 2"

== The Women's Image Awards 25 ==
Ann-Margret was the Living Legend recipient, presented by Wallis Annenberg. Loretta Devine was the Lifetime Achievement recipient, and Regina K. Scully was the Humanitarian Honoree recipient.

The Women's Image Awards 25 Winners:

- Documentary Film (Short) - Angola Do You Hear Us? Voices From A Plantation Prison
- Documentary Film (Feature) - Jeanette Lee Vs.
- Comedy Writers - Annabel Oakes, Grease: Rise of the Pink Ladies "We're Gonna Rule the School"
- Drama Writers - Ashley Victoria Hudson, Brett Mahoney, Power Book II: Ghost "Your Perception, Your Reality"
- Comedy Series - Grease: Rise of the Pink Ladies "We’re Gonna Rule the School"
- Actress, Comedy Series - Jaime Pressly, Welcome to Flatch "Welcome to (Barb) Flatch"
- Made for Television Movie/Limited-Series - A Small Light
- Actress, Made for Television Movie/Limited-Series - Riley Keough, Daisy Jones & The Six
- Reality Series - Growing Up "Amiri"
- Actress Reality Series - Dr. Sandra Lee, Dr. Pimple Popper
- Drama Series - The Serpent Queen "Medici Bitch"
- Actress, Drama Series - Loretta Devine, P-Valley "Jackson"
- Film / Show Producers - Stacie Passon, The Serpent Queen "Medici Bitch"
- Film Directors - Sara Dosa, Fire of Love
- Series Directors - Alethea Jones, Grease: Rise of the Pink Ladies "We're Gonna Rule the School"
- Animated Series - HouseBroken
- Actress, Animated Series - Clea DuVall, HouseBroken "Who's Obsessed?"

== The Women's Image Awards 26 ==
Melissa Etheridge was the Living Legend recipient, presented by Lucy Walsh, Maria Cuomo Cole was the Humanitarian Honoree recipient. Hosted by Loni Love.

The Women's Image Awards 26 Winners

- Documentary Film (Short) - Last Song From Kabul
- Documentary Film (Feature) - I’m Not Broken
- Film / Show Writers - Joanna Johnson, Good Trouble ” “What Now?"
- Film / Show Producers - Full Court Press "Down to Business"
- Comedy Series - Shining Vale "Smile"
- Actress, Comedy Series - Leslie Bibb, Palm Royale “Pilot”
- Made for Television Movie/Limited-Series - Lessons in Chemistry
- Actress, Made for Television Movie/Limited-Series - Loni Love, Binged to Death
- Reality Series - Caught in the Act: Unfaithful
- Actress Reality Series - TIED
  - Jessica Alba, Lizzy Mathis, Honest Renovations
  - Tami Roman, Caught in the Act: Unfaithful
- Drama Series - Fallout “The End”
- Actress, Drama Series - Carrie Preston, Elsbeth “Pilot”
- Film Director (feature) - Joie Jacoby, Candace Parker: Unapologetic
- Film Director (short) - Nazenet Habtezghi, Birthing a Nation: The Resistance of Mary Gaffney
- Series Directors - Nancy Schwartzman, Sasha Reid and the Midnight Order “I Think My Ex-Husband Is a Serial Killer”
- Animated Series - Harley Quinn “Gotham's Hottest Hotties”
- Actress, Animated Series - Kaley Cuoco, Harley Quinn “Gotham's Hottest Hotties”

== 27th Women's Image Awards ==
The Women's Image Awards 27 Honorees

- Patricia Clarkson Lifetime Achievement Honoree
- Gina Belafonte Woman of the Year
- Zibby Owens Community Activist Honoree
- Cecilia de Mille Presley Cecilia de Mille WIN Award Tribute

The Women's Image Awards 27 Television & Film Nominees & Winners

Documentary Film (Short)	Motorcycle Mary (winner); Love to the Max; Social Studies; The Dirty Business of Monkey Laundering
Documentary Film (Feature)	Beyond The Gaze: Jule Campbell's Swimsuit Issue; A Radical Act: Renee Montgomery(winner); SEC Storied: Kick Start; Trafficked: Underworlds with Mariana van Zeller
Film / Show Producers	Terry Dunn-Meurer Kathryn Vaughan Christine Lenig Courtney Ennis Annie Mangone Cynthia Bowles Caitlin Cutt Elizabeth Meeker A Body in the Snow: The Trial of Karen Read; Ashley Bembry-Kaintuckl In the Arena: Serena Williams(winner); Laura Dodd 30 for 30 "American Son”; Jen Flanz The Daily Show "Desi Lydic Unpacks the 2024 Presidential Election Results"; Audrey Morrissey The Voice "Playoffs, Part 2"
Comedy Series	Étoile (winner); Running Point; Abbott Elementary; Leanne
Actress, Comedy Series	Taylor Misiak Going Dutch (winner); Kristen Bell Nobody Wants This; Kate Hudson Running Point; Kristen Johnston Leanne
Made for Television Movie/Limited-Series	The Handmaid’s Tale; Disclaimer; The White Lotus; Dying for Sex (winner)
Actress, Made for Television Movie/Limited-Series	Cate Blanchett Disclaimer; Michelle Williams Dying for Sex (winner); Meghann Fahy Sirens; Uzo Aduba The Residence
Reality Series	The Voice; Baylen Out Loud; Full Court Press (winner); In the Arena: Serena Williams
Actress Reality Series	Baylen Dupree Baylen Out Loud (winner); Shaun Robinson 90 Day Fiancé; Beth Karas The Curious Case Of…; Amina Stevens First-Time Buyer's Club
Drama Series	The Rainmaker; The Pitt; Duster (winner); Matlock
Actress, Drama Series	Elizabeth Tabish The Chosen; Kathy Bates Matlock; Molly Parker Doc “Pilot”; Lana Parrilla The Rainmaker (winner)
Directors	Nicole Noren Missing at Sea; Suemay Oram 30 for 30: Stolen Gold; Haley Watson Motorcycle Mary; Lauren Fisher In the Arena: Serena Williams "This Is You" (winner); Terry Dunn-Meurer A Body in the Snow: The Trial of Karen Read
Animated Series	Harley Quinn (winner); Invincible Fight Girl; Arcane
Feature Film	Hamnet; The Testament of Ann Lee; Hedda (winner); Sorry Baby
Actress Feature Film	Amanda Seyfried The Testament of Ann Lee (winner); Jessie Buckley Hamnet; Emma Stone Bugonia; Laura Dern Is This Thing On?
International Feature Film	Alpha; All That's Left of You; The Voice of Hind Rajab (winner); Sentimental Value; Left-Handed Girl
Actress International Feature Film	Elle Fanning Sentimental Value; Cherien Dabis All That's Left of You; Fernanda Torres I'm Still Here (winner); Golshifteh Farahani Alpha; Renate Reinsve Sentimental Value
Writers Feature Film	Chloé Zhao & Maggie O'Farrell Hamnet (winners); Mona Fastvold The Testament of Ann Lee; HIKARI Rental Family; Mary Bronstein If I Had Legs I'd Kick You
Directors Feature Film	Chloé Zhao Hamnet; Mary Bronstein If I Had Legs I'd Kick You; Mona Fastvold The Testament of Ann Lee (winner); Julia Ducournau Alpha

== 28th Women's Image Awards ==
The Women's Image Awards 28 Honoree

- Shaun Robinson Woman of the Year
- Helen Hong Host

The Women's Image Awards 28 Television & Film Nominees & Winners

Documentary Film	The Fighting Tiger; Taurasi (winner); The Many Livs of Benjaman Kyle; The Secrets We Bury; The Cult Behind the Killer: The Andrea Yates Story
Film / Show Producers	Katie Mohs Nancy Mcakenzie Wendy Douglas Baylen Out Loud; Lisa Lax Nancy Stern Winters Amanda Postel The Fighting Tiger; Octavia Spencer Stephanie Kluft Amy Lee-Jones Verity Thomson Christina Douglas Lorna Thomas Paris Pekcerman Lost Women of Alaska “No Longer Silent” (winner); Elle Fanning Michelle Pfeiffer Nicole Kidman Eva Anderson Dearbhla Walsh Dakota Fanning Margo’s Got Money Troubles; Julie Pizzi Erica Ross Iyanla Vanzant Shirley Salomon Daryl Bolander Iyanla: The Inside Fix "Unmasking the Truth"
Comedy Series	Abbott Elementary; Margo’s Got Money Troubles; Hacks (winner); Nobody Wants This
Actress, Comedy Series	Elle Fanning Margo’s Got Money Troubles; Sarah Goldberg The Audacity; Jean Smart Hacks (winner); Michelle Pfeiffer Margo’s Got Money Troubles
Made for Television Movie/Limited-Series	The Christmas Showdown; All Her Fault; Ride or Die (winner); The Beast in Me
Actress, Made for Television Movie/Limited-Series	Octavia Spencer “Ride or Die”; Sarah Snook All Her Fault; Hannah Waddingham Ride or Die (winner); Loretta Devine The Christmas Showdown
Reality Series	Iyanla: The Inside Fix; Baylen Out Loud (winner); 1000-Lb. Sisters; Heart & Hustle: Houston; “Belle Collective: Birmingham”
Actress Reality Series	Baylen Dupree Baylen Out Loud (winner); Shaun Robinson 90 Day Fiancé: Before the 90 Days; Holly Madison Lethally Blonde; Beth Karas The Curious Case Of…; Iyanla Vanzant Iyanla: The Inside Fix
Drama Series	Anna Pigeon; The Diplomat; Lioness (winner); Scarpetta
Actress, Drama Series	Tracy Spiridakos Anna Pigeon (winner); Keri Russell The Diplomat; Amy Adams Cape Fear; Jamie Lee Curtis Scarpetta
Directors	Lisa Joy Fallout “The Other Player” (winner); Georgi Banks-Davies The Night Manager; Lauren Fisher Believers: Boston Red Sox “Doubt”; Lisa Lax Nancy Stern Winters The Fighting Tiger; Sara Kandasamy Lost Women of Alaska “No Longer Silent”; Liz Friedlander Fallout “The Wrangler”
Writers	Morwyn Brebner Anna Pigeon “Episode 101”; Lisa Lax Nancy Stern Winters’’ The Fighting Tiger (winner); Debora Cahn The Diplomat “Schrodinger's Wife”; Eve Anderson Margo's Got Money Troubles “Lock and Load”

== Other charities ==
Although Women's Image Network is a 501(c)3 non-profit, it has also supported several other charities including The Mary Magdalene Foundation, Women's Care Cottage, The Mission, Gilda's Club, The American Cancer Society. WIN supports charities whose efforts range from fighting homeless, assisting sex-workers, curing HIV/AIDS and cancer, eliminating poverty, biodiversity conservation and wild animal rescue. In some years, proceeds from the WIN Awards Gala have been used to fund other WIN events.
