= Unite4:humanity =

unite4:humanity awards
- unite4:humanity logo
- Awarded for: Philanthropic efforts
- Country: United States
- Presented by: unite4:good Variety
- First award: 2014

unite4:humanity is an annual award ceremony and gala that takes place during the Thursday before the Academy Awards. First held in 2014, the unite4:humanity gala celebrates humanitarian efforts and philanthropists throughout the world, giving awards in several different fields.

== unite4:good ==
unite4:humanity was the launching pad for businessman and philanthropist Anthony Melikhov, who founded the international nonprofit organization unite4:good foundation following the first event's success. unite4:good is a movement developed to, "inspire and empower positive, global change through acts of kindness."

== unite4:humanity 2014 ==
The first unite4:humanity gala was held on Thursday, February 27, 2014, at Sony Pictures Studios, in Los Angeles, California. The event was immediately well received by the public as a successful fundraiser and awards ceremony. Executive produced by Melikhov, Unite4:Humanity was created to demonstrate, "commitment to a mission of promoting positivity, inspiring charitable engagement and empowering acts of kindness and service." Comedian Andy Samberg was master of ceremonies and numerous celebrities in the fields of entertainment, business, and politics attended. Some notable guests at the event include:

- Forest Whitaker, Presenter
- Demi Lovato, Winner - Young Luminary Award
- Julia Louis-Dreyfus, Winner - Creative Commitment to Television Award
- William H. Macy, Presenter
- Selena Gomez, Winner - Young Visionary Award
- Jada Pinkett Smith
- Alicia Keys, Performer
- Robert De Niro, Honoree - Creative Commitment to Film
- Martin Scorsese, Honoree - Creative Conscience
- Sean Penn, Presenter
- Steve Coogan
- Philomena Lee, Winner - Unite4: Humanity Everyday Hero Award
- Eva Longoria
- John Sykes, President of Clear Channel Entertainment Enterprises, Winner -Social Visionary Award
- Wilmer Valderrama, presented Food Bank of Northern Nevada president Cherie Jamason with the $50,000 unite4:humanity Inspiration Award.

Former President Bill Clinton was the recipient of the Unity Recognition Award and the keynote speaker for the event. The former president delivered a speech about working together to make change and earned several standing ovations throughout the night. He was also seen taking "selfies" with numerous celebrities including star of HBO Comedy VEEP, Julia Louis-Dreyfus.

== unite4:humanity 2015 ==
The second unite4:humanity awards took place February 19, 2015, hosted by Variety and the united4:good foundation. The mentioned guests at this year's event were:

- The 4:inspiration heroes Stephanie Yee, Hannah Weinronk, and Sunny Kim were selected out of seven candidates to receive grants of $50,000 each that went to their nonprofit organization Real Food Challenge.
- Special guests that presented awards were, among others, Demi Lovato, Blair Underwood, Wilmer Valderrama, Forest Whitaker.

Awards received
Recipient	Award	Main organization of work
Halle Berry	Creative Conscience Award	Jenesee Center
Lauren and Aaron Paul	unite2gether Award	Kind Campaign
P!nk	Music Visionary Award	No Kid Hungry (Jeff Bridges also supports)
Josh Hutcherson	Young Humanitarian Award	Straight But Not Narrow
Christina Applegate	Saint Vintage Love Cures Award	Right Action for Women
Ewan McGregor	International Humanitarian Award	UNICEF UK
Amy Poehler	Unity Award	
Zendaya	Young Luminary Award	

== unite4:humanity 2016 ==
The 3rd Annual Unite4:Humanity Event, hosted by unite4:good foundation and Variety, took place February 25, 2016, held at the Montage in Beverly Hills, CA. This year guests were Morgan Freeman, Olivia Wilde, Matthew McConaughey, Gina Rodriguez, Wilmer Valderrama, Seth Rogen and Lauren Miller.

Funds raised through the event will benefit the DoMore4:Good organization, which creates positive programs with volunteer opportunities that are supported and sustained by local communities.

The first award were given by unite4:good founder, Anthony Melikhov, to Hilarity for Charity founders, Rogen and Miller, for their work in raising awareness and funds for those suffering from Alzheimer's and their families.

Actor and comedian Adam Pally of “Happy Endings” and “The Mindy Project” was the host of the affair.

Awards received
Recipient	Award	Main organization of work
Gina Rodriguez	Young Humanitarian	We Will Foundation
Seth Rogen and Lauren Miller	Unite2gether award	Hilarity for Charity
Morgan Freeman	Karma Award	Tallahatchie River Foundation
Matthew McConaughey	Creative Conscience Award	Just keep livin Foundation
Olivia Wilde	Unite4Children Award	Save the Children
Ann Gloag	Global Philanthropy Award	The Freedom From Fistula Foundation
Liz Hausle	Women Empowerment Award	
Dorian Murray	Saint Vintage Love Cures Award	
David Meltzer	Sports Humanitarian Award	Crescent Moon Foundation

== Anthony Melikhov ==
Anthony Melikhov is an entrepreneur, global philanthropist, and the founder of unite4:good LLC.
