= Aaron Paul =

American actor (born 1979)

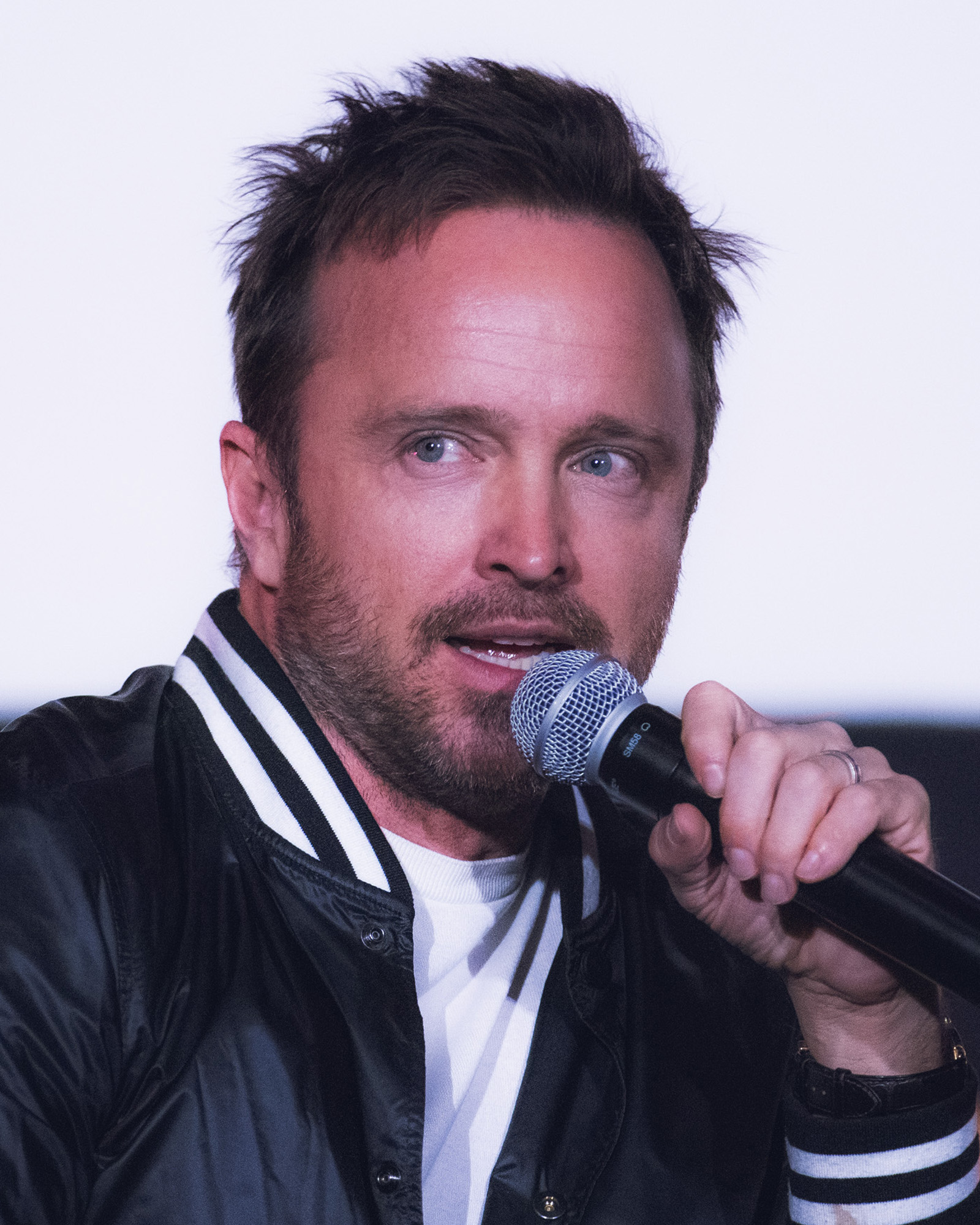
- Paul in 2025
- Born: Aaron Paul Sturtevant; August 27, 1979 (age 47); Emmett, Idaho, U.S.
- Occupation: Actor
- Years active: 1998–present
- Spouse: Lauren Parsekian (m. 2013)
- Children: 2

Aaron Paul (born Aaron Paul Sturtevant; August 27, 1979) is an American actor. He is best known for portraying Jesse Pinkman in the AMC series Breaking Bad (2008–2013) for which he won the Primetime Emmy Award for Outstanding Supporting Actor in a Drama Series three times. He went on to reprise the role in the Netflix sequel film El Camino (2019) and during the final season of the spin-off series Better Call Saul (2022).

Paul began his career with roles in several music videos, guest roles in television, and minor roles in films. In 2007, he had a recurring role as Scott Quittman on the HBO series Big Love (2006–2011), and in 2009, he starred in the remake of The Last House on the Left. Following Breaking Bad, he starred in films such as Need for Speed (2014), Hellion (2014), Exodus: Gods and Kings (2014), Eye in the Sky (2015), and Central Intelligence (2016).

He voiced Todd Chavez in the Netflix animated series BoJack Horseman (2014–2020), on which he was also an executive producer, and portrayed Eddie Lane in the Hulu drama series The Path (2016–2018), and Caleb Nichols in the HBO science fiction drama series Westworld (2020–2022). In 2025, he voiced Robert Robertson III in the video game Dispatch.

== Early life and education ==
Aaron Paul was born Aaron Paul Sturtevant, in Emmett, Idaho, on August 27, 1979, the youngest of four children born to Darla (née Haynes) and Baptist minister Robert Sturtevant. He was born a month premature in his parents' bathroom. He grew up participating in church plays. He graduated in 1997 from Centennial High School in Boise, Idaho, after which he drove to Los Angeles in his 1982 Toyota Corolla with his mother and $6,000 in savings.

Soon after arriving in Los Angeles, he appeared on an episode of the CBS game show The Price Is Right, which aired on January 3, 2000. Appearing under his birth name, he played and lost his pricing game and overbid on his Showcase by $132. He also worked as a movie theater usher at Universal Studios in Hollywood.

== Career ==
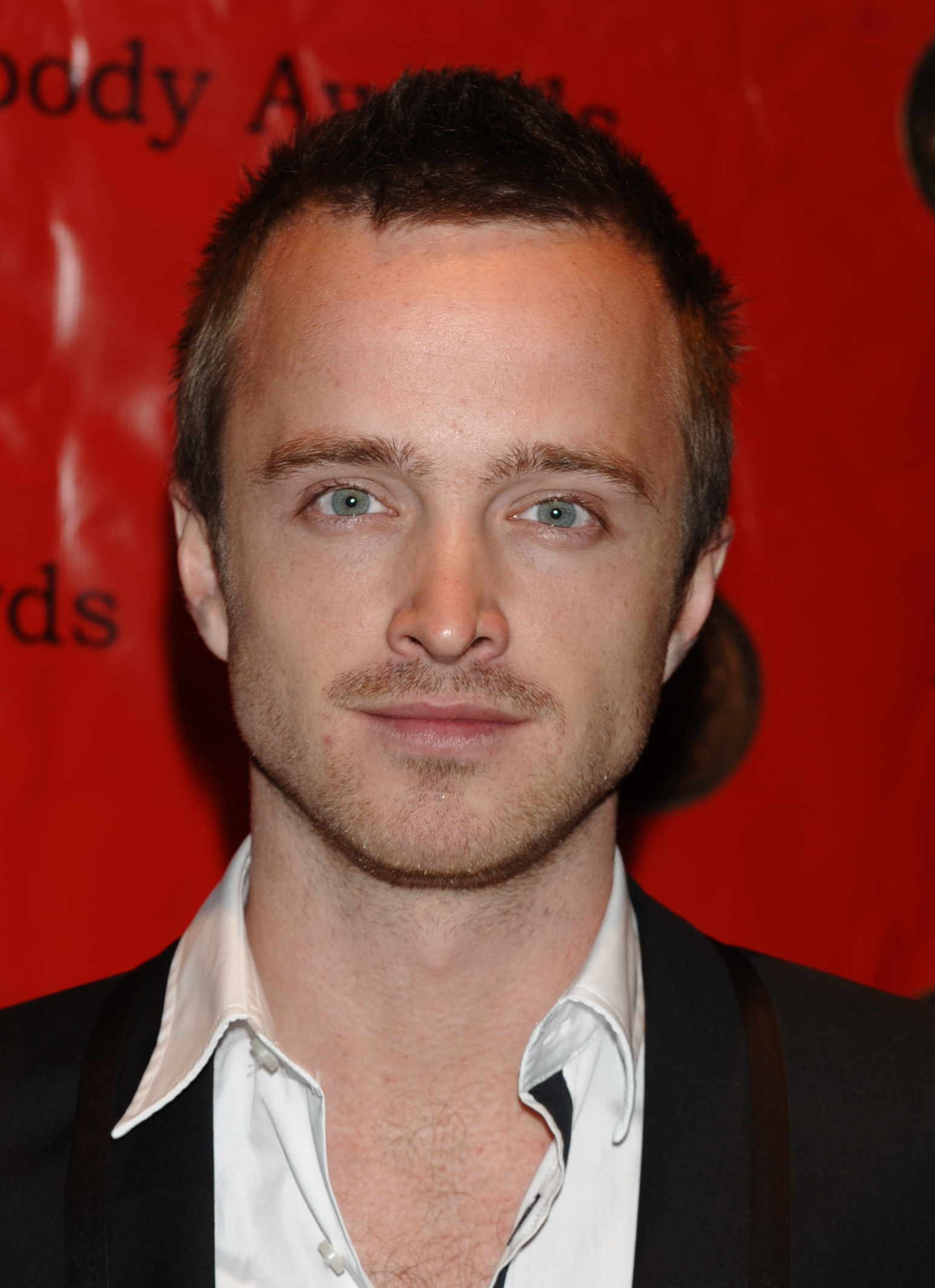
Paul at the 2009 Peabody Awards

In 1996, Paul went to Los Angeles for the International Modeling and Talent Association competition. He won runner-up and signed with a manager. He starred in the music videos for Korn's song "Thoughtless" and Everlast's song "White Trash Beautiful". He was also featured in television commercials for Juicy Fruit, Corn Pops, and Vanilla Coke. He appeared in the films Whatever It Takes (2000), Help! I'm a Fish (2001), K-PAX (2001), National Lampoon's Van Wilder (2002), Bad Girls From Valley High (2005), Choking Man (2006), Mission: Impossible III (2006), The Last House on the Left (2009), and Need for Speed (2014). He starred as "Weird Al" Yankovic in the Funny or Die short Weird: The Al Yankovic Story (2010), and has guest starred on television shows such as The Guardian, CSI: Crime Scene Investigation, CSI: Miami, ER, Sleeper Cell, Veronica Mars, The X-Files, Ghost Whisperer, Criminal Minds, and Bones.

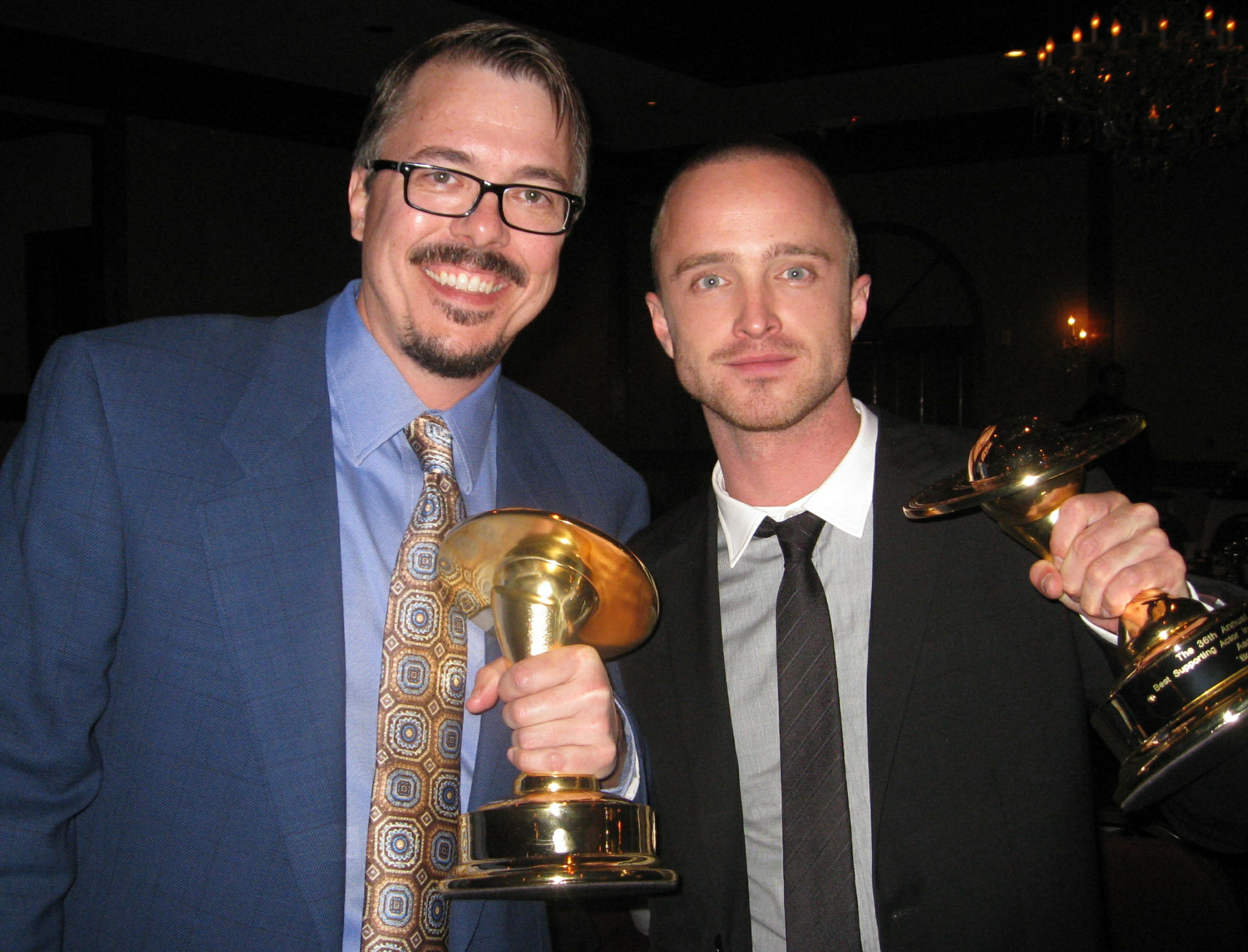
Paul and Vince Gilligan at the 2010 Saturn Awards

Paul first became known for his role as Scott Quittman on HBO's Big Love, on which he appeared fourteen times. In 2008, he began playing Jesse Pinkman on the AMC series Breaking Bad. His character was originally meant to die during the first season, but after seeing the chemistry between Paul and the lead actor Bryan Cranston, the series creator Vince Gilligan changed his mind and modified the original plans to include Jesse as a main character. For his role in Breaking Bad, Paul was nominated for the Primetime Emmy Award for Outstanding Supporting Actor in a Drama Series in 2009, 2010, 2012, 2013, and 2014; he won the award in 2010, 2012, and 2014.

Paul starred in the film Smashed, which was one of the official selections for the 2012 Sundance Film Festival. In a 2012 interview with ESPN, he spoke about his childhood experience as a Boise State Broncos fan and discussed the challenges of portraying a meth addict in Breaking Bad. In 2012 and 2013, he made appearances on Tron: Uprising, voicing a character named Cyrus.

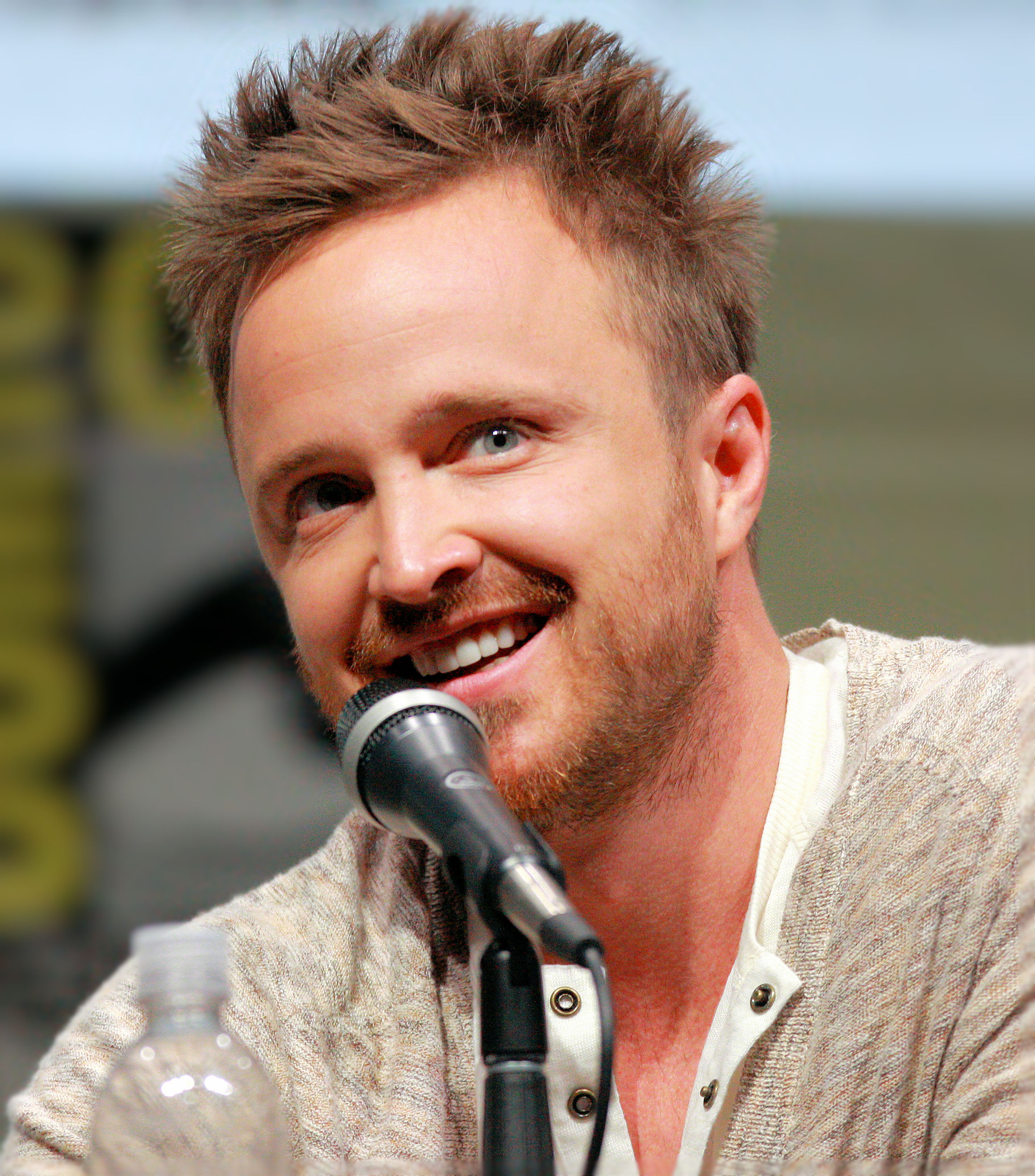
Paul at the 2013 San Diego Comic-Con

In 2013, he was featured on Zen Freeman's dance song, "Dance Bitch". He made a surprise appearance on Saturday Night Live's 39th season opener as "meth nephew", a relative of Bobby Moynihan's popular "drunk uncle" character. In 2014, Paul starred in Need for Speed, as a street racer recently released from prison who takes revenge on a wealthy business associate. Paul stars alongside Juliette Lewis in the family drama Hellion, as the drunken father of two young vandals. Also in 2014, he co-starred in the biblical epic Exodus: Gods and Kings, portraying the Hebrew prophet Joshua.

Paul was a cast member on the animated Netflix series BoJack Horseman portraying Todd Chavez. He appeared on WWE Raw to promote Need for Speed, by entering the arena in a sports car with Dolph Ziggler, providing commentary for Ziggler's match against Alberto Del Rio, and helping Ziggler win by distracting Del Rio. In 2016, Paul played the young Louis Drax's father who becomes the focus of a criminal investigation after his son has a near-fatal fall in The 9th Life of Louis Drax, a supernatural thriller based on a book of the same name.

In 2016, Paul began playing Eddie Lane, a man who in a life crisis joins a cult but subsequently questions his faith, in the Hulu series The Path. That same year, Paul voiced the main protagonist, Nyx Ulric, in Kingsglaive: Final Fantasy XV.

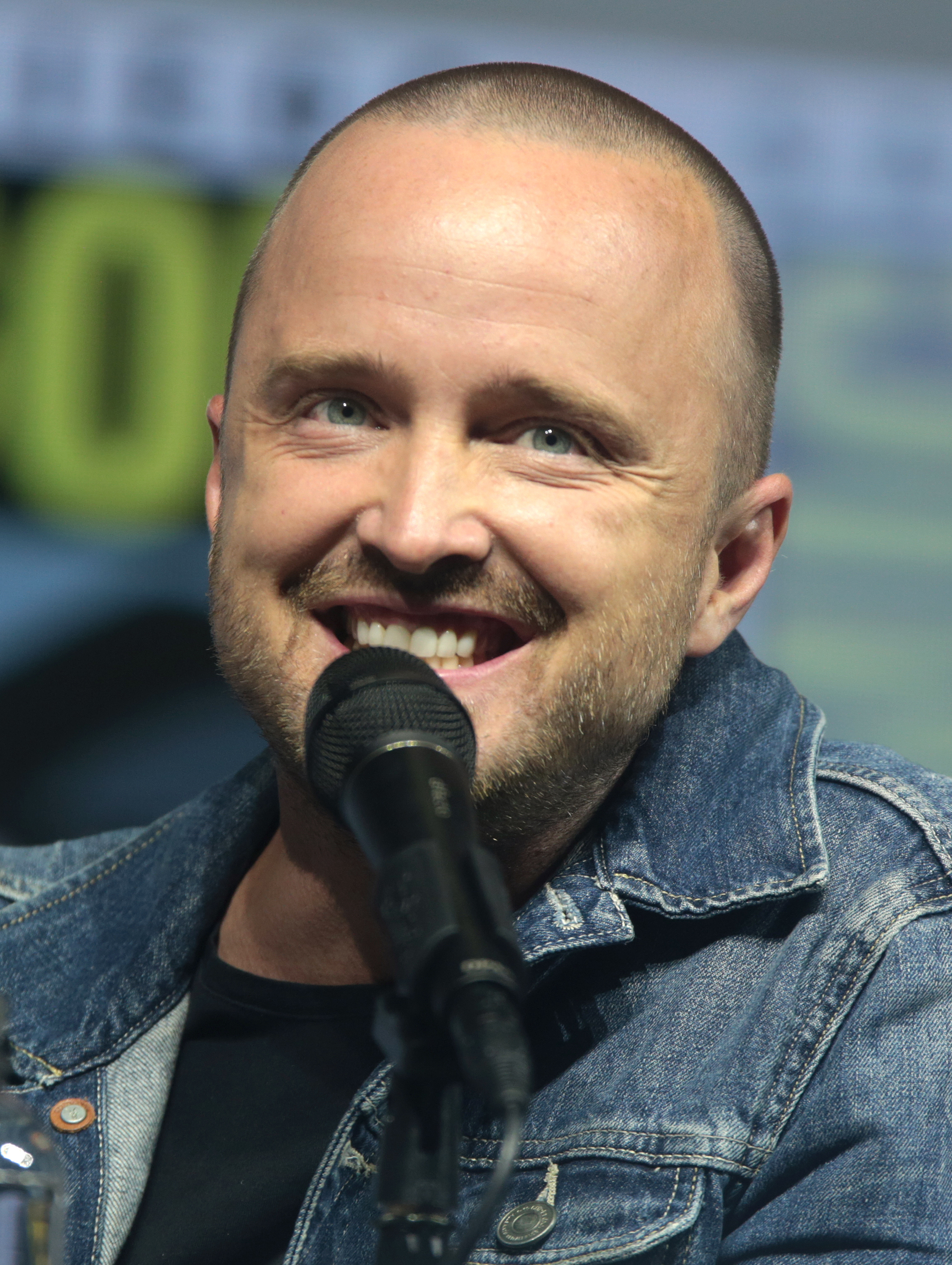
Paul at the 2018 San Diego Comic-Con

Paul was a regular cast member of the Apple TV+ crime drama series Truth Be Told (2019–2023), opposite Octavia Spencer and Lizzy Caplan.

In 2018, Paul joined the cast of the HBO science fiction western series Westworld for the third season, portraying the character Caleb Nichols.

In 2019, Paul reprised his role as Jesse Pinkman in the Netflix Film El Camino: A Breaking Bad Movie, a sequel to the television series Breaking Bad.

Paul starred in the sci-fi thriller Dual alongside Karen Gillan, which was filmed entirely in Tampere, Finland.

In 2023, Paul starred in a main role in the third episode of the sixth series of Black Mirror, "Beyond the Sea".

In 2025, Paul voiced Powerplex in the sixth episode of the third season of Invincible, "All I Can Say Is I'm Sorry".

Paul stars as the lead voice acting role in the 2025 video game Dispatch, playing the role of Robert Robertson. In 2026, Paul was cast in the upcoming third season of the Amazon Prime Video series Fallout.

== Activism and other ventures ==
In 2013, Paul helped organize a contest to raise $1.6 million for his wife's non-profit anti-bullying organization, the Kind Campaign. The winners of the contest won a trip to the Hollywood Forever Cemetery screening of the final episode of Breaking Bad.

Paul has spoken positively about the asexual community, as a result of portraying the asexual character Todd Chavez on BoJack Horseman. In 2019, Paul stated that he was "so proud to represent that community... it's so nice to have a character on TV—especially on a show so powerful as BoJack—that represents a community that should be represented."

In 2019, Paul attended the launch event for The Promise Armenian Institute Event at UCLA in support of Armenian studies and human rights, alongside other high-profile stars like Kim Kardashian and Christian Bale.

In 2019, Paul and Cranston released their own line of mezcal called Dos Hombres.

== Personal life ==
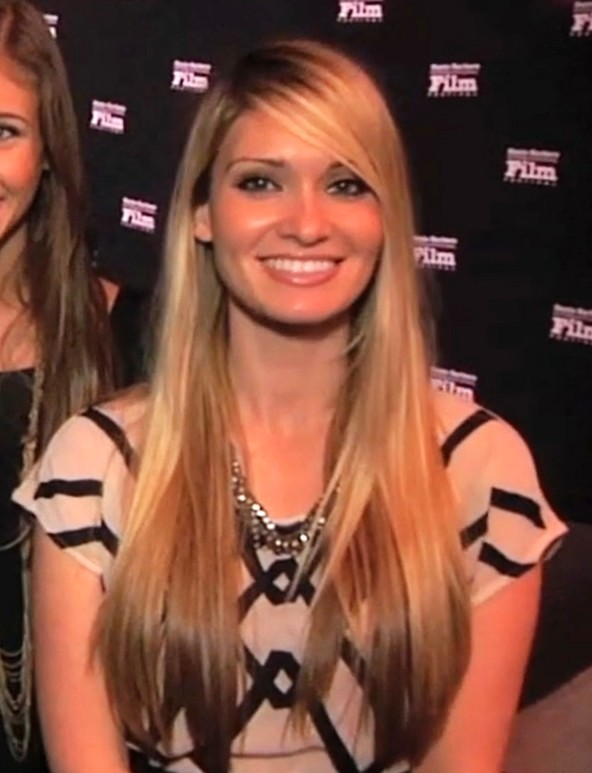
Lauren Parsekian in 2011

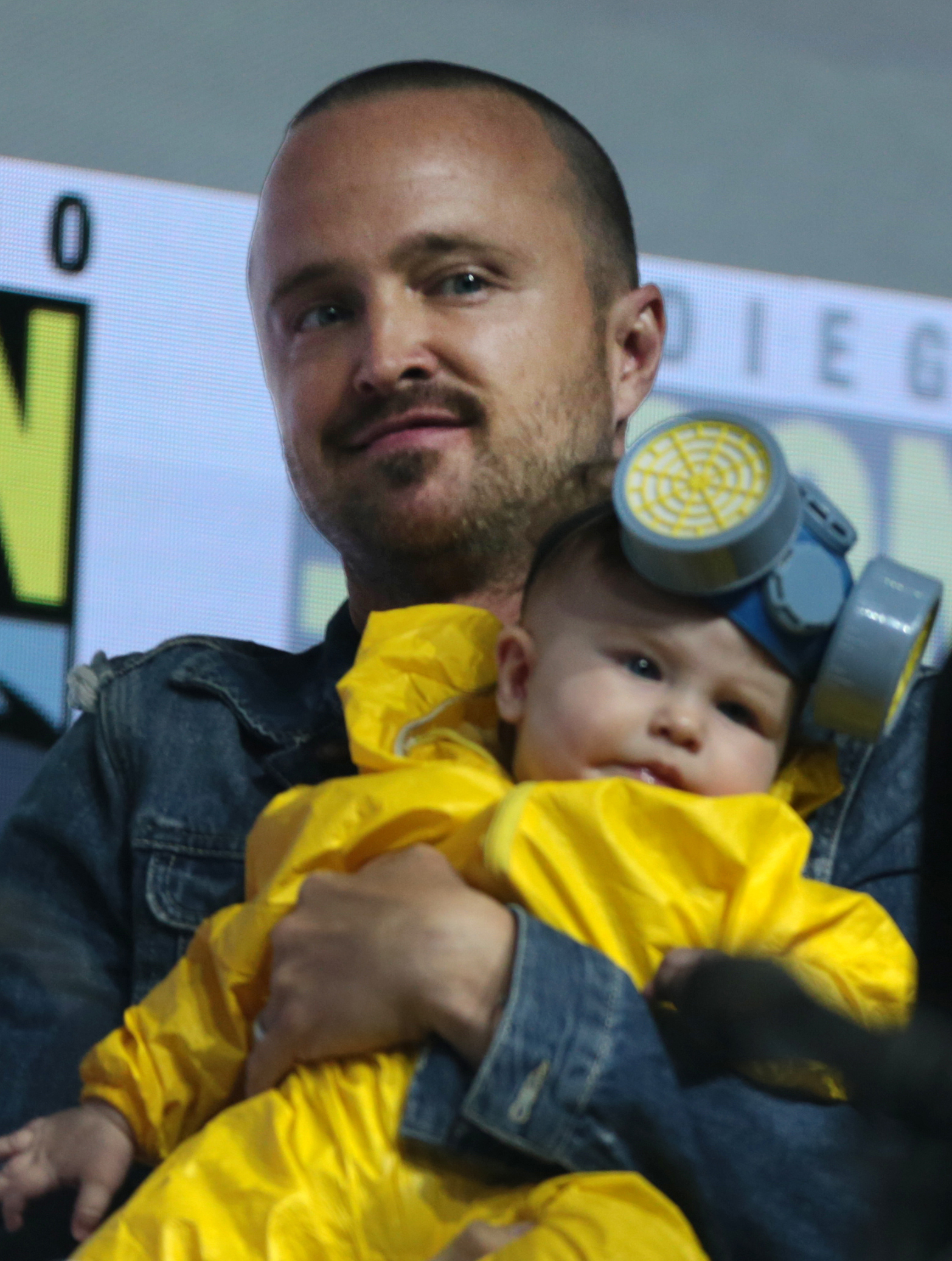
Paul with his daughter at San Diego Comic-Con, July 2018

Paul met actress and director Lauren Parsekian at the Coachella Festival, and they became engaged in Paris on January 1, 2012. They were married in a 1920s Parisian carnival-themed wedding in Malibu on May 26, 2013, with musicians Foster the People and John Mayer performing. Paul emailed the song "Beauty" by The Shivers to everyone on the guest list and asked them to learn the lyrics so they could sing along during the ceremony.

They lived in the Los Feliz neighborhood of Los Angeles, having sold their previous home in West Hollywood, and own a second cabin-style home near McCall, Idaho. They have a daughter born February 2018 and a son born April 2022. Paul's Breaking Bad co-star Bryan Cranston is the son's godfather. In the aftermath of the Los Angeles wildfires in early 2025, the couple sold their undamaged residence and relocated with their children to Paris.

In April 2013, to commemorate the final episode of Breaking Bad, Paul and Cranston got Breaking Bad tattoos on the last day of filming; Paul had the phrase "no half measures" tattooed onto his biceps, while Cranston had the show's logo tattooed onto one of his fingers. In October that year, during a ceremony at the Egyptian Theatre in Boise, Idaho, Governor Butch Otter declared October 1 "Aaron Paul Sturtevant Day".

Paul legally dropped his birth surname of "Sturtevant" in November 2022 so that he, his wife, and their children would all officially share the "Paul" surname.

== Awards and nominations ==
Year	Award	Category	Nominated work	Result	Ref.
2009	Primetime Emmy Award	Outstanding Supporting Actor in a Drama Series	Breaking Bad	Nominated	
2009	Saturn Award	Best Supporting Actor on Television	Breaking Bad	Won	
2010	Primetime Emmy Award	Outstanding Supporting Actor in a Drama Series	Breaking Bad	Won	
2010	PRISM Award	Male Performance in a Drama Series	Breaking Bad	Nominated	
2010	Satellite Award	Best Supporting Actor – Series, Miniseries, or Television Film	Breaking Bad	Nominated	
2010	Saturn Award	Best Supporting Actor on Television	Breaking Bad	Nominated	
2010	TCA Award	Individual Achievement in Drama	Breaking Bad	Nominated	
2011	Saturn Award	Best Supporting Actor on Television	Breaking Bad	Won	
2011	PRISM Award	Male Performance in a Drama Series	Breaking Bad	Won	
2011	Screen Actors Guild Award	Outstanding Performance by an Ensemble in a Drama Series	Breaking Bad	Nominated	
2012	Critics' Choice Television Award	Best Supporting Actor in a Drama Series	Breaking Bad	Nominated	
2012	Primetime Emmy Award	Outstanding Supporting Actor in a Drama Series	Breaking Bad	Won	
2013	Golden Globe Award	Best Supporting Actor – Series, Miniseries, or Television Film	Breaking Bad	Nominated	
2013	Satellite Award	Best Supporting Actor – Series, Miniseries, or Television Film	Breaking Bad	Won	
2013	Saturn Award	Best Supporting Actor on Television	Breaking Bad	Won	
2013	Screen Actors Guild Award	Outstanding Performance by an Ensemble in a Drama Series	Breaking Bad	Won	
2013	Dorian Award	TV Performance of the Year – Actor	Breaking Bad	Nominated	
2013	Primetime Emmy Award	Outstanding Supporting Actor in a Drama Series	Breaking Bad	Nominated	
2013	PRISM Award	Male Performance in a Drama Series	Breaking Bad	Nominated	
2014	Critics' Choice Television Award	Best Supporting Actor in a Drama Series	Breaking Bad	Won	
2014	Primetime Emmy Award	Outstanding Supporting Actor in a Drama Series	Breaking Bad	Won	
2014	Young Hollywood Award	Fan Favorite Actor – Male	Breaking Bad	Nominated	
2019	Primetime Emmy Award	Outstanding Animated Program	BoJack Horseman (episode: "Free Churro")	Nominated	
2019	Satellite Award	Best Miniseries or Television Film	El Camino: A Breaking Bad Movie	Won	
2019	Satellite Award	Best Actor in a Miniseries or TV Film	El Camino: A Breaking Bad Movie	Nominated	
2020	Critics' Choice Television Award	Best Movie Made for Television	El Camino: A Breaking Bad Movie	Won	
2020	Producers Guild of America Award	Outstanding Producer of Streamed or Televised Motion Pictures	El Camino: A Breaking Bad Movie	Nominated	
2020	Primetime Emmy Award	Outstanding Television Movie	El Camino: A Breaking Bad Movie	Nominated	
2020	Primetime Emmy Award	Outstanding Animated Program	BoJack Horseman (episode: "The View from Halfway Down")	Nominated	
2021	Saturn Award	Best Actor in a Film	El Camino: A Breaking Bad Movie	Nominated	
2026	D.I.C.E. Awards	Outstanding Achievement in Character	Dispatch	Nominated	
2026	BAFTA Games Award	Performer in a Leading Role	Dispatch	Nominated	
