= The Curious Case Of... =

American television series

- Genre: Documentary
- Presented by: Beth Karas
- Country of origin: United States
- Original language: English
- No. of seasons: 2
- No. of episodes: 12

Production
- Running time: 42–62 minutes

Original release
- Network: Investigation Discovery
- Release: January 13, 2025 – present

Related
- The Curious Case Of Natalia Grace

The Curious Case Of... is an American true crime television series. This show follows interesting and very odd cases that have made the news in United States. Presenter, Beth Karas, a legal expert, gives a summary of what had happened in each case and what she thinks should be done from a legal perspective. The show interviews many people from the case: victims, friends and family of victims, police officers, and those who fought legal battles for the case. The first episode is about skateboarder and stuntman Bam Margera.

== Episodes ==
=== Season 1 (2025) ===
No. overall	No. in season	Title	Original release date
1	1	"Bam Margera"	January 13, 2025
A legal battle wages between YouTuber and lawyer BJ Courville and entrepreneur Lima Jevremovic over Jevremovic's guardianship of Bam Margera. Margera struggles with sobriety.
2	2	"The Girl Who Died Twice"	January 20, 2025
A woman claims to be Mary Louise Day more than 20 years after her disappearance. Although her DNA matches that of Mary's parents, the family has doubts about her true identity.
3	3	"The Orphan Impostor"	January 27, 2025
Fleeing a rape charge, Nicholas Rossi fakes his own death and moves to Scotland. When discovered, Rossi claims to be an orphan named Arthur Knight.
4	4	"The Funeral Home of Horrors"	February 3, 2025
Jon and Carie Hallford, owners of The Return to Nature Funeral Home in Penrose, Colorado are charged with corpse abuse after allegedly giving customers fake cremains and improperly storing bodies.
5	5	"Jodi Hildebrandt"	February 10, 2025
Utah counselor Jodi Hildebrandt's campaign against maturation leads to a disturbing alliance with vlogger Ruby Franke. Both are eventually convicted of child abuse of Franke's children.
6	6	"The Doomsday Cat Cult"	February 17, 2025
Sheryl Ruthven runs Eva’s Eden, a cat rescue that operates like a cult. She convinces her followers to retaliate against her enemies and adopt cats to ensure their own salvation.

=== Season 2 (2026) ===
No. overall	No. in season	Title	Original release date
7	1	"Death By Detox?"	TBA
A man claiming to be a doctor has his patients hooked up to saline bags for weeks, calling it a detox. Health deteriorates for many and the families of his patients look for retribution.
8	2	"The Killer Cheesecake"	TBA
After a woman has a near death experience from eating a drug-laced cheesecake, a private eye tracks down a woman fleeing from Russia on a murder charge who is now poisoning people who get in her way.
9	3	"The Skincare Queen and the Hitman - Part 1"	TBA
Dawn DaLuise owns a skincare company in Los Angeles and thinks she is being harassed by her neighbor. The police try to charge her with hiring a hitman to finish the job.
10	4	"The Skincare Queen and the Hitman - Part 2"	TBA
Dawn’s ex-friend tells his side of the story and how he is now in a feud with his neighbor. All credibility for both sides falls apart.
11	5	"The Principal Who Hypnotized His School"	TBA
An assistant principal in Florida offers hypnotism to help students with anxiety and depression. However, multiple deaths are attributed to the effects of hypnotism.
12	6	"The Woman Dying for Attention"	TBA
A woman, Sarah D, lies about having multiple illnesses. She becomes best friends with multiple women while lying to them about illnesses, bad news in her life, and generally things to manipulate others into caring about her.
13	7	"The Town with Tourette’s"	TBA
Le Roy, New York, has multiple high school students start experiencing symptoms similar to Tourette’s Syndrome. As news coverage increased, more and more students start having symptoms.
14	8	"The Corpse Who Came to Dinner"	TBA
In Wyalusing, Pennsylvania, a woman is keeping the corpses of her family members, some dead and buried for years, now dug up in her house. The whole town knows and does nothing for years.
