= Lauren Parsekian =

American director and actress (born 1986)

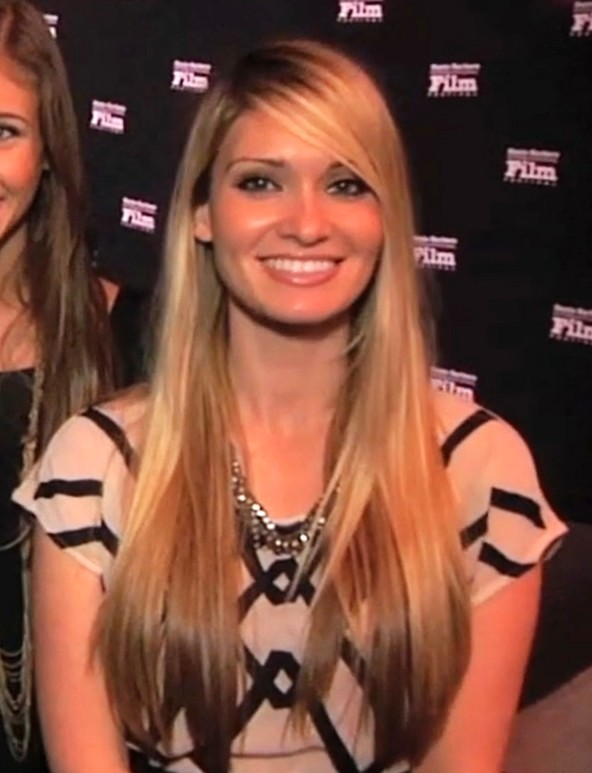
- Parsekian in 2011
- Born: December 8, 1986 (age 39)
- Other name: Lauren Paul
- Occupations: Actress, director, producer
- Years active: 2011–present
- Spouse: Aaron Paul (m. 2013)
- Children: 2

Lauren Paul (née Parsekian; born December 8, 1986) is an American director and actress, known for Finding Kind (2011). She founded the Kind Campaign in 2009.

== Career ==
Parsekian founded the Kind Campaign in 2009, a non-profit organization and school program that brings awareness to the negative and lasting effects of girl-against-girl bullying. She directed and produced the documentary Finding Kind focused on girl-on-girl bullying.

== Filmography ==
=== Film ===
Year	Title	Role
2011	Finding Kind	Director

=== Television ===
Year	Title	Role
2012	NCIS: Special Agent DiNozzo Visits Dr. Phil	Doctor

== Personal life ==
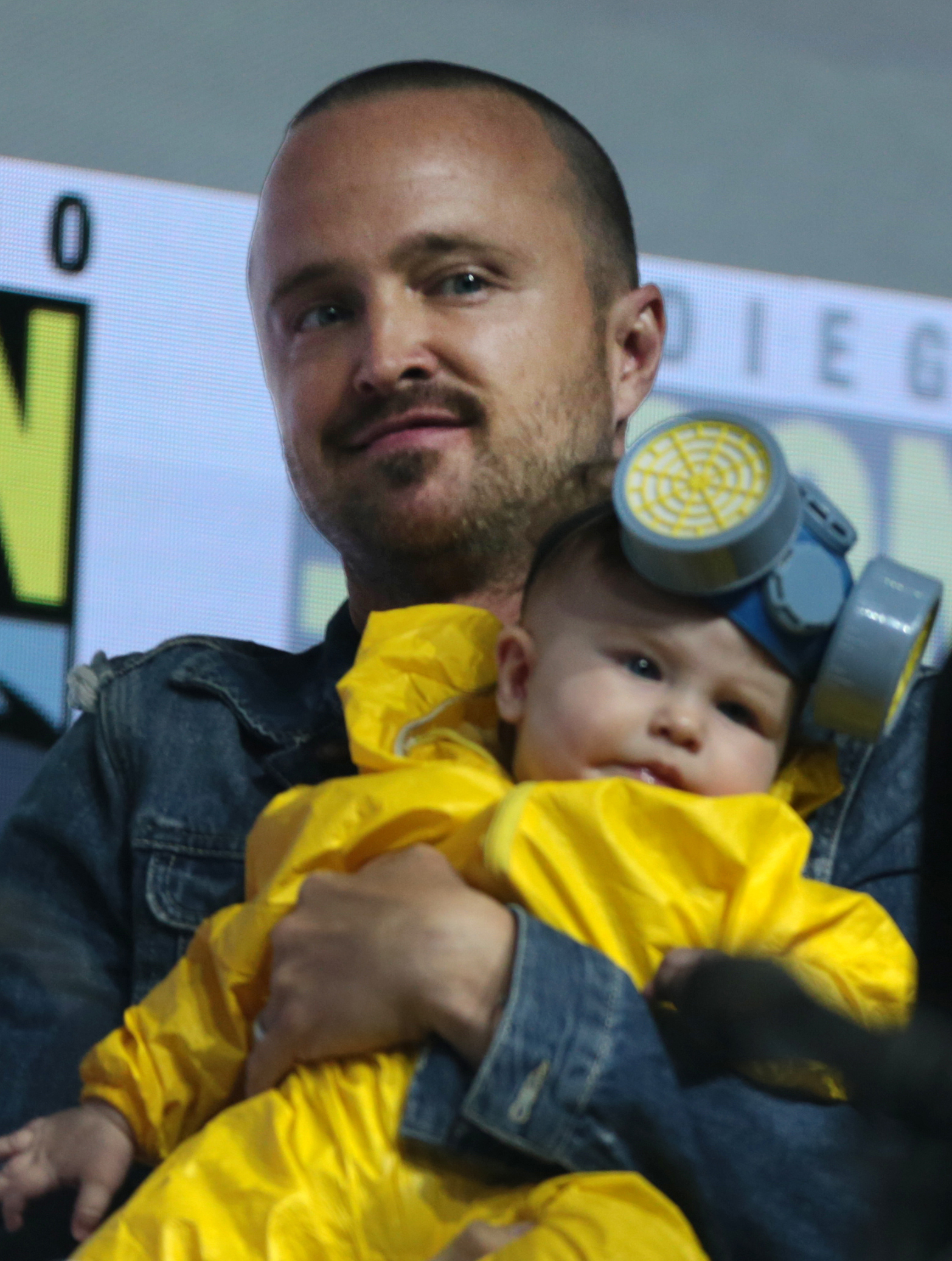
Aaron Paul with daughter in 2018

Parsekian is of Armenian descent. She is the great granddaughter of Armenian Genocide survivors from former Western Armenia. Parsekian became engaged to Aaron Paul in Paris on January 1, 2012. The two met at the Coachella Festival. They were married on May 26, 2013, in a 1920s Parisian carnival-themed wedding in Malibu, California; Foster the People and John Mayer performed. They have two children. In 2022, they filed to legally change their surnames: Aaron officially adopted his professional name, Paul, as his legal surname (replacing Sturtevant), and Lauren changed her surname from Parsekian to Paul.
