= Anna and Ellen Pigeon =

English mountaineers

Anna Pigeon
- Born: July 1832; Clapham, London, England
- Died: 15 March 1917 (aged 84)
- Burial place: West Norwood Cemetery, London
- Occupation: Mountaineer
- Father: Henry Pigeon

Ellen Abbot
- Born: Ellen Pigeon; 1836; Clapham, London, England
- Died: 5 July 1902 (aged 65–66)
- Burial place: West Norwood Cemetery, London
- Occupation: Mountaineer
- Spouse: Bradley Abbot
- Father: Henry Pigeon

Anna Pigeon (July 1832 – 15 March 1917) and Ellen Abbot (née Pigeon; 1836 – 5 July 1902) were English mountaineers, known for their extensive climbing experience in the Alps from the 1860s to the 1880s.

== Biography ==
Anna and Ellen Pigeon were born in Clapham, London, to Henry Pigeon, a wine importer and distiller. Anna was her parents' sixth daughter; Ellen was born four years later. Their parents' financial support allowed them to maintain a household of their own in Clapham and pursue mountain climbing in the Alps.

The Pigeons began by hiking and, as described by Clare Roche, "metamorphosed into experienced and dedicated mountaineers". Over ten years, they travelled to the Alps every summer to climb mountains. They embarked on their first alpine expedition in 1864, focusing on modest peaks of around 2,500 metres (8,200 ft), and over a five-year period they gradually gained experience on higher peaks. Their most famous expedition took place in 1869, when they traversed the Seserjoch (Sesia Joch), a pass between Zermatt in Switzerland and Alagna in Italy that had only been ascended once before and never descended. Their traverse turned out to have been a mistake: they had intended to cross a more straightforward pass, the Lysjoch, but their guide, Jean Martin de Vissoie, had become lost and they descended to Alagna instead of Gressoney-La-Trinité as they had planned. Given the circumstances surrounding their traverse, their claim of success was met with scepticism, and the matter was not resolved until Giuseppe Farinetti of the Italian Alpine Club verified the Pigeons' account of the traverse and the British Alpine Club agreed that they had been successful.

In 1872, they made the first traverse from Macugnaga to Alagna, and in 1873 the first female traverse of the Matterhorn from Breuil-Cervinia to Zermatt. They remained active climbers through the 1880s, publishing a short account of their mountaineering experience titled Peaks and Passes in 1885.

In 1876, Ellen married Bradley Abbot, a vicar and widower. By that point the Pigeons had climbed 66 mountains over 10,000 feet (3,000 m) and 60 passes over 9,000 feet (2,700 m). After Ellen's death in 1902, Anna remained active in the mountaineering community. She became a vice president of the Ladies' Alpine Club in 1910 and was an honorary member from 1911 until her death in 1917. Both sisters are buried at West Norwood Cemetery in London.
