= Kind Campaign =

American anti-bullying organization

- Formation: February 11, 2009
- Founders: Lauren Parsekian Paul; Molly Thompson
- Type: Nonprofit organization
- Headquarters: Malibu, California
- Location: United States
- Official language: English
- Website: KindCampaign.com

Kind Campaign, founded in 2009, is a nonprofit organization and school program that brings awareness and healing to the negative and lasting effects of girl-against-girl bullying. Its co-founders, Lauren Paul and Molly Thompson, directed and produced the documentary film Finding Kind, which focuses on the subject.

== History ==
Kind Campaign began in Malibu, California, as an outgrowth of a documentary film project. Its founders studied at Pepperdine University, where they majored in documentary film and telecommunications. During the 2008–09 academic year, Kind Campaign received a Service and Social Action grant from the Pepperdine Voyage, a program funded by the Lilly Endowment.

In 2011, Kind Campaign partnered with Mattel's Monster High franchise, and animated versions of Paul and Thompson appeared in a special episode of the brand's YouTube web series, recreating a Kind Campaign assembly.

Around the tenth anniversary of Mean Girls in 2014, Kind Campaign launched the slogan "You Can Sit With Us", which spread widely on social media. The organization later partnered with Kohl's on girls' and juniors' clothing lines, including a "You Can Sit With Us" T-shirt, with $1 from each shirt in its 2017 collection going to Kind Campaign.

As of 2023, Kind Campaign assemblies had been held in thousands of schools worldwide for more than 500,000 students, and TLC sponsored that year's Founders Assembly Tour, the founders' 24th, which visited 30 schools across North America. The documentary Finding Kind is screened as part of the assemblies, which take place in schools almost every day of the school year.

In 2026, Kind Campaign is mentioned by name in the "Home Economics" episode of the Prime Video miniseries Carrie, and its pamphlets appear on the school guidance counselor's desk in an earlier episode.

== Programs ==
Kind Campaign's main program is its free in-school assemblies, which combine a screening of Finding Kind with discussion and interactive activities. The organization also offers a 19-week Kind Club curriculum and Kind Camps. In 2016, it launched the Kind Ambassadors volunteer program, which lets individuals bring Kind Campaign assemblies and clubs to their local schools and communities. The organization also promotes its work on social media, particularly Instagram, where it posts a group photo of the participants after each assembly.

Early in the organization's history, Lauren Paul (then Lauren Parsekian) described its intended assembly program:

Assuming that Kind Campaign takes off, our hope is to create a program within schools where a group of qualified young women tour the country to screen our documentary and hold an honest dialogue about the issues, after the viewing. We know that this topic is a hard one for schools to tackle, so hopefully this program would help add some insight and create a safer community for their female populations.

— Lauren Parsekian, President of Kind Campaign
