= Baylen Out Loud =

American reality television series (2025–present)

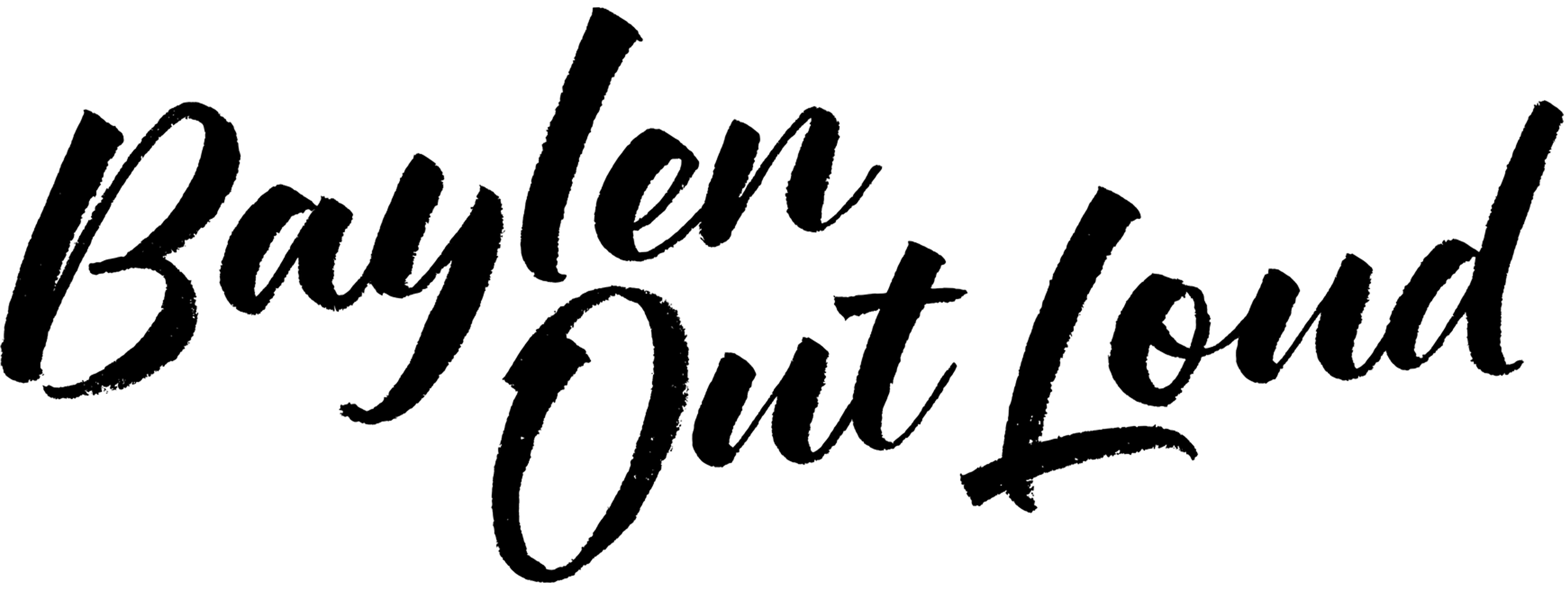
- Genre: Reality
- Starring: Baylen Dupree
- Country of origin: United States
- Original language: English
- No. of seasons: 3
- No. of episodes: 38

Production
- Executive producer: Michael Levitt
- Production locations: Harper's Ferry, West Virginia; Arlington, Virginia
- Camera setup: Multi-camera
- Running time: 42 minutes
- Production company: Michael Levitt Productions

Original release
- Network: TLC; HBO Max
- Release: January 13, 2025 – present

Baylen Out Loud is an American reality television series broadcast on TLC, with episodes streaming the day after through HBO Max, and premiered on January 13, 2025. The show documents Baylen Dupree-Dooley, a young woman navigating life with Tourette syndrome. It features her parents, five siblings, and husband, Colin Dooley.

== Background ==
In late 2020, Baylen Dupree began posting videos on TikTok depicting her life with Tourette syndrome, including her verbal tics, and gained millions of followers. Dupree said she first began experiencing tics at age six or seven, and that they intensified during the COVID-19 pandemic. At 17, she was diagnosed with Tourette syndrome, and she is among the minority that experiences coprolalia, involuntary utterances of socially-inappropriate words. She also has obsessive–compulsive disorder. In 2022, as a pre-nursing student in her first year of studies at West Virginia University, she took her spring semester classes online due to the severity of her condition. At the time of the show's premiere in 2025, Dupree had an audience of 10 million followers on TikTok and 1.4 million followers on Instagram.

On December 3, 2024, TLC announced it had acquired the show. The first season premiered January 13, 2025, depicting Baylen Dupree's life with verbal tics and features her family and then-boyfriend Colin Dooley, a member of the United States Air Force. Dupree is depicted attending Tic-Con in Dallas, Texas, and getting engaged to Dooley (Dupree said that she and Dooley became engaged on September 9, 2024). The season finale chronicles Dupree's move from her parents' home near Harper's Ferry, West Virginia, to an apartment with Dooley, in Arlington, Virginia.

== Episodes ==
Season	Episodes	Originally released	
Season	Episodes	First released	Last released
1	9	January 13, 2025	March 10, 2025
2	14	October 7, 2025	December 30, 2025
3	15	May 19, 2026	August 25, 2026

=== Season 1 (2025) ===
No. overall	No. in season	Title	Original release date
1	1	"I Have Tourette's Stupid!"	January 13, 2025
2	2	"The Airport Is a Tic Disaster"	January 20, 2025
3	3	"We All Have Tourette's"	January 27, 2025
4	4	"Going for Narnia!"	February 3, 2025
5	5	"It Was Him, Chainsaws, Me"	February 10, 2025
6	6	"I Have News"	February 17, 2025
7	7	"What if My Dad Says No?"	February 24, 2025
8	8	"You Don't Have to Stare Into My Soul"	March 3, 2025
9	9	"This Is a Big Plot Twist"	March 10, 2025

=== Season 2 (2025) ===
No. overall	No. in season	Title	Original release date
10	1	"Obsessed with Everything"	October 7, 2025
11	2	"The Ticcer"	October 14, 2025
12	3	"Addicted All Around"	October 21, 2025
13	4	"Anxiety on High Alert"	October 28, 2025
14	5	"It's So Inappropriate!"	November 4, 2025
15	6	"She's Gonna Lose Her Mind"	November 11, 2025
16	7	"Did I Mention That I Have Tourette?"	November 18, 2025
17	8	"Saddle Up!"	November 25, 2025
18	9	"I'm on the Struggle Bus"	December 2, 2025
19	10	"Get Me Out of Here!"	December 9, 2025
20	11	"Your Anxiety Is Giving Me Anxiety"	December 16, 2025
21	12	"Ticcing in a British Accent"	December 23, 2025
22	13	"My Brain Feels Different"	December 30, 2025
23	14	"Tasting Out Loud"	December 30, 2025

=== Season 3 (2026) ===
No. overall	No. in season	Title	Original release date
24	1	"It's Time To Party"	May 19, 2026
25	2	"Altared Plans"	May 26, 2026
26	3	"Unsave the Date"	June 2, 2026
27	4	"Say Yes to the Stress"	June 9, 2026
28	5	"Knot on my Bingo Card"	June 16, 2026
29	6	"'Til Death Do Us Part"	June 23, 2026
30	7	"Roses Are Red, Officiants Are Bald"	June 30, 2026
31	8	"A Tasting of Things to Come"	July 7, 2026
32	9	"Showered With Opinions"	July 14, 2026
33	10	"To Have and To Hold a Mortgage"	July 21, 2026
34	11	"Dance Now or Forever Hold Your Peace"	July 28, 2026
35	12	"Ready or Knot"	August 4, 2026
36	13	"A Veiled Surprise"	August 11, 2026
37	14	"Wedding, Set, Go!"	August 18, 2026
38	15	"Vows Out Loud"	August 25, 2026

== Critical reception ==
Today wrote, "Dupree has plenty of fans, but she's also had to contend with her fair share of critics, including some who claim that she doesn't really have Tourette syndrome or that she fakes her tics. It's a topic she addressed in the second episode of Baylen Out Loud, saying: 'People have said that I'm faking Tourette for attention. Why would I do that? Would you want to live like this?'"

Yahoo wrote, "Fans of Baylen are already familiar with the often-humorous outbursts caused by her tics, and Baylen Out Loud will give a more detailed view of what she and her family deal with as she handles living with Tourette syndrome."

Collider wrote, "The moment I saw the TLC series premiere, I could tell Baylen Out Loud was unlike any other show I've watched, reality or otherwise."

== See also ==
- List of programs broadcast by TLC
