= Finding Kind =

- Directed by: Lauren Parsekian
- Produced by: Lauren Parsekian; Molly Stroud
- Starring: Lauren Parsekian; Tetia Stroud
- Cinematography: Christopher Hamilton
- Edited by: Vegard H. Sorby
- Music by: Andrew Skrabutenas
- Distributed by: IndieFlix
- Release date: 2011
- Running time: 77 minutes
- Country: United States
- Language: English

Finding Kind is a 2011 American documentary film directed by Lauren Parsekian. It follows two friends traveling across America exploring the topic of how women can be mean to other women.

In May 2011, filmmakers Lauren Parsekian and Molly Stroud went on a tour of the U.S., showing the documentary to school students and encouraging them to fill out apology cards for someone they've bullied or to write descriptions of how they themselves have experienced bullying.

== Cast ==
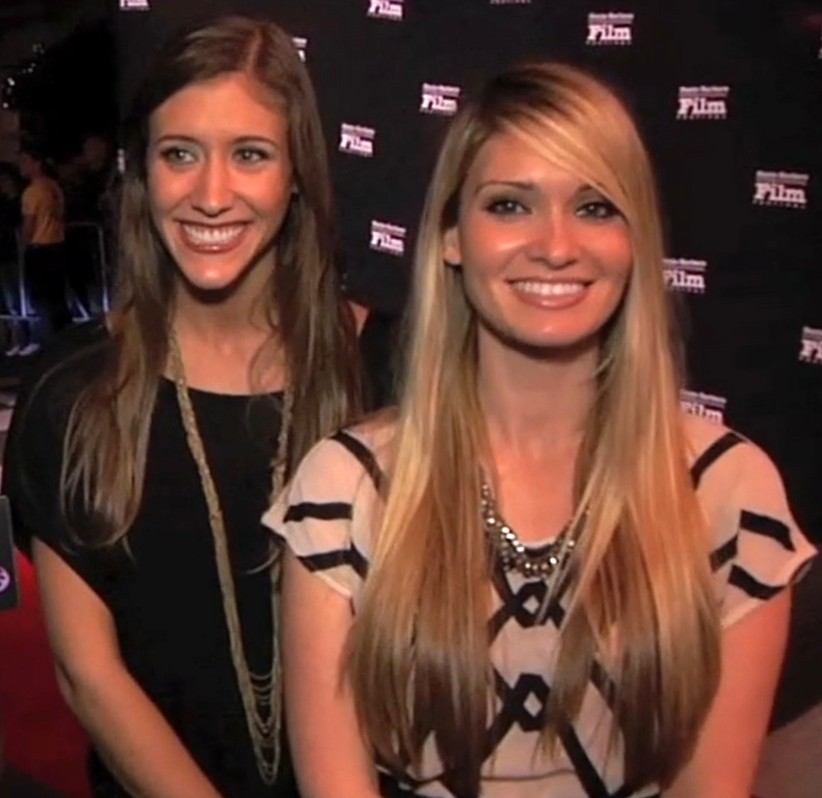
Left to right: Molly Stroud, Lauren Parsekian in 2011

- Debra Parsekian ... Herself
- Lauren Parsekian ... Herself
- Molly Stroud ... Herself
- Tetia Stroud ... Herself
