= Beth Karas =

American journalist and lawyer (born 1957)

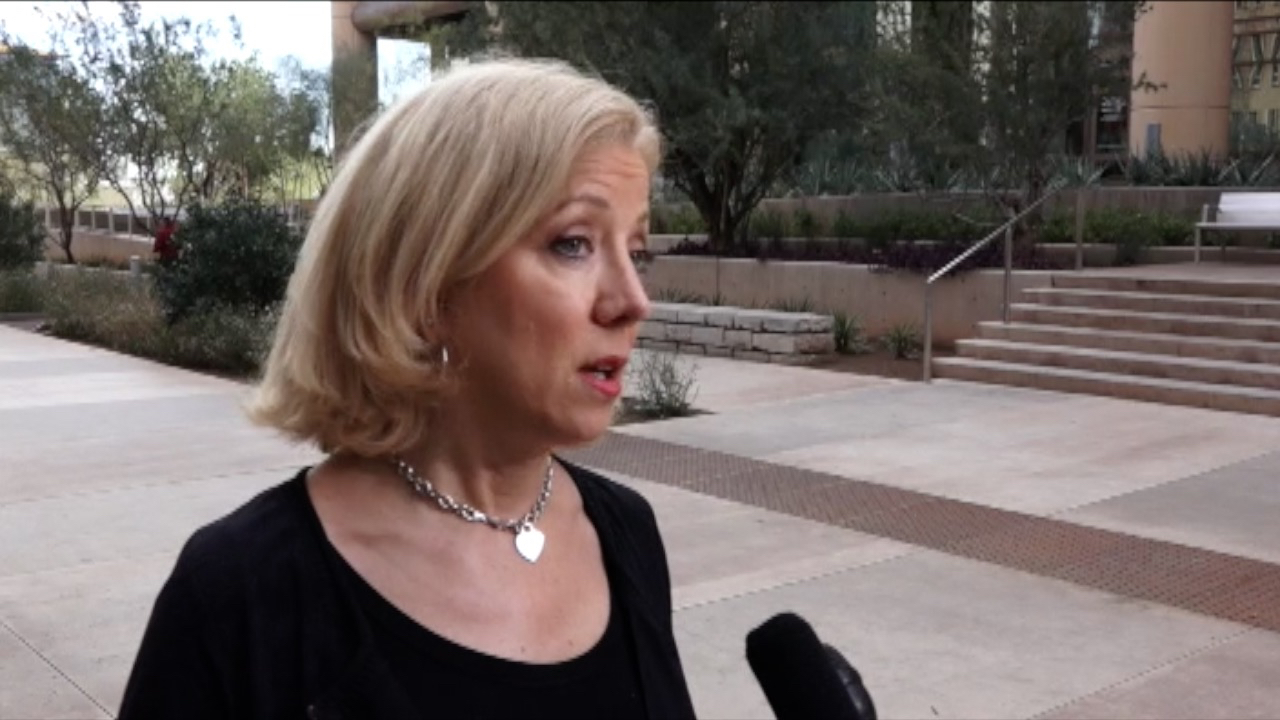
- Karas 2015
- Born: January 29, 1957 (age 69); Deerfield, Massachusetts, United States of America
- Citizenship: U.S.
- Education: Mount Holyoke College
- Occupations: Attorney, TV Commentator, Legal Analyst
- Years active: 1987–present
- Known for: Television legal analyst

Beth Karas (born January 29, 1957) is an American attorney and television commentator who worked as a Senior Reporter with truTV, providing commentary on a number of high-profile cases, including the rape trial of Kobe Bryant, the Martha Stewart trial, and the murder trials of Robert Blake, Scott Peterson, and Jodi Arias.

== Early life and education ==
Karas grew up in Deerfield, Massachusetts and graduated from Frontier Regional School in 1975. She received a B.A. in political science and Spanish from Mount Holyoke College in 1979 and a Juris Doctor degree from Fordham Law School. She was admitted to the New York State Bar in 1987.

== Career ==
Karas was an assistant district attorney in New York City for eight years. She joined Court TV as a commentator in 1994, having filled in as an anchor on multiple occasions. She also provided live legal commentary to BBC Radio in London from 1998 to 2011. CourtTV was subsequently renamed TruTV and eventually merged with its sister channel, HLN. A juror was dismissed from the Jodi Arias trial after she approached Karas, who covered the case first for HLN and then as a freelance journalist. She is currently an independent legal consultant. On August 16, 2019 she was a guest anchor on Court TV.
