= Casper's Scare School (disambiguation) =

Casper's Scare School is an animated television film starring Casper the Friendly Ghost.

Casper's Scare School may also refer to:

- Casper's Scare School (TV series), a 2009 children's television series
- Casper's Scare School (video game), a 2008 PlayStation 2 adventure game
