= Peter Brennan (producer) =

American journalist

Peter Brennan is an American television producer, writer, journalist and author.

Brennan is the creator and executive producer of A Current Affair, Judge Judy and Good Day New York.

In 1996, Brennan created and produced Judge Judy, its companion show, Judge Joe Brown and Cristina's Court. Created and produced the syndicated court show, Last Shot with Judge Gunn in 2011.

Brennan created the morning news program Good Day New York for Fox television station WNYW.

He also created, wrote and produced An American Story – Bad Night in Cottageville (starring Bill Bixby and Calista Flockhart), as well as The Extraordinary, a one-hour series.

Brennan revived A Current Affair for 20th Century Fox television in 2005. He is a former foreign correspondent for News Corporation in New York and city editor for the Sydney Daily Mirror.

== Books ==
Authored two novels, Sudden Death and Razorback. The latter was made into a motion picture distributed by Warner Brothers in 1984.

Co-authored Those Wild, Wild Kennedy Boys! with Steve Dunleavy.

== Awards ==
Brennan's Cristina's Court Emmys were awarded in 2008, 2009 and 2010. Last Shot With Judge Gunn took the Emmy in the same Legal/Courtroom category in 2012.

== Selected filmography ==
- 2011 Last Shot with Judge Gunn (TV series) (executive producer)
- 2011 The MoShow (TV series) (executive producer)
- 2006 Cristina's Court (TV series) (executive producer)
- 2005 A Current Affair (TV series) (executive producer)
- 1998 Judge Joe Brown (TV series) (executive producer)
- 1996 The Story First: Behind the Unabomber (TV movie) (executive producer)
- 1996 Boxing: A Different Look (TV movie) (executive producer, producer)
- 1996 Judge Judy (TV series) (executive producer)
- 1994 Premier Story (TV series) (executive producer)
- 1993 The Extraordinary (TV series) (executive producer)
- 1993 Marilyn: The Last Word (video documentary) (executive producer)
- 1990 An American Story (TV movie) (executive producer)
- 1990 Hard Copy (TV Series) (executive producer)
- 1986 A Current Affair (TV series) (producer)

=== Writer ===
- 2011 The MoShow (TV series)
- 1996 The Story First: Behind the Unabomber (TV movie)
- 1996 Boxing: A Different Look (TV movie)
- 1993 Marilyn: The Last Word (video documentary)
- 1981 Razorback (novel)
