= Doug Bruckner =

American television news reporter

Doug Bruckner is an American television news correspondent, reporter, host, voice-over artist and producer, who is among the best-known correspondents in the history of tabloid television, well known for his exclusive interviews with notorious criminals.

== Career highlights ==
A featured correspondent on Extra and A Current Affair syndicated newsmagazines, it was as senior correspondent of the outrageous Hard Copy that Bruckner became known internationally. His exclusive reporting on the Menéndez brothers, Cheyenne Brando and Michael Jackson, as well as prison interviews with "Long Island Lolita" Amy Fisher, the Nancy Kerrigan hit men and Charles Manson, made headlines around the world.

Featured as narrator of television documentary special, Shadow Operations, about work of paranormal research group Project Camelot, that aired on truTV on November 7, 2012.

Supervising producer of 2009 two-hour Fox network television special, "Octomom: The Incredible Unseen Footage", focusing on the chaotic life of Nadya Suleman, the single mother of 14 children.

Produced segments with Jesse Ventura for the truTV series, Conspiracy Theory with Jesse Ventura, revealing new information on the assassination of John F. Kennedy and secrets of Area 51.

Appears as a regular on the syndicated talk show, Maury, spotlighting video reality shows from Nash Entertainment.

Voices and reports special features and trailer for 2007 Frozen Pictures nonfiction film, Basketball Man.

Hosted the 1999 video/DVD Celebrities Caught on Camera: Volume 1.

Played himself in the 1995 Universal motion picture, Casper.

== The Bounty ==
Expert on "Mutiny on the Bounty" and member of the London-based Pitcairn Island Study Group.

Completed February 2007 research and filming trip to Pitcairn Island for "The Search for Fletcher Christian: One Journalist's Journey" segment of the 2008 nonfiction film series, The Bounty Project.

Produces and hosts Real Life Bloody Pirates Uncensored! (2008) documentary series.

== Early career ==
Bruckner spent nine years as an investigative reporter at the NBC owned-and-operated KNBC-TV in Los Angeles, California from 1980-1988. His Unit 4 reports were the first to cover staged auto accident insurance fraud and identity theft.

Received numerous awards throughout his career, including an LA Press Club Award, Golden Mike, Emmy, Associated Press Award for Investigative Reporting, LA Press Club award and National Award for Education Reporting.

With Gary Boyd, founded SurfSirs Club at Burbank High School.

== Sources ==
- Warner Brothers Extra TV bio
- Basketball Man trailer
- News item
