= In Person =

In Person may refer to:

- In Person (Bobby Timmons album), 1961
- In Person (Vince Guaraldi album), 1963
- In Person (Cannonball Adderley album), 1968
- In Person (Ike & Tina Turner album), 1969
- In Person (Sweet Female Attitude album), 2001
- In Person (film), 1935 film starring Ginger Rogers
- In Person!, 1959 album by Tony Bennett, accompanied by the Count Basie Orchestra
- In Person (Canadian TV series), Canadian music variety television series
- In Person (American TV series), 1996–1997 talk show
- "In Person", 2008 song by the Pussycat Dolls from Doll Domination

== See also ==
- Litigant in person
