= Spooky Spooktown =

American comic book series

Spooky Spooktown is an American comic book series, published by Harvey Comics. The series ran from September 1961 to December 1976; in all, 66 issues were published.

Spooky Spooktown featured stories from Harvey Comics' stable of characters, featuring Spooky the Tuff Little Ghost. Other Harvey characters that appeared included Casper the Friendly Ghost, The Ghostly Trio, and Wendy the Good Little Witch.

The series started as a one-shot in 1961. It became a regular title in 1962, published quarterly. By the end of the 1960s, it was published bi-monthly, a frequency which prevailed for most of its remaining run.

Spooky Spooktown was published as a "Giant-Size" 68-page comic until issue #39 (April 1971), then a 52-page "Giant-Size" from issue #40 (August 1971) to #45 (September 1972). Issues #46-66 were standard-size 32-page issues. These 32-page issues were made up largely of reprints from Harvey Comics' vast catalog.

Spooky Spooktown was canceled after the December 1976 issue; the mid-1970s saw a large number of titles canceled by Harvey (Little Dot, Little Lotta and Playful Little Audrey were also canceled that year).

== See also ==
- Ghost stories
- List of ghosts
