= Mastertronic Group =

British software publisher

Mastertronic Group Limited
- Company type: Private
- Industry: Video games
- Founded: 2004; 22 years ago
- Founder: Andy Payne
- Defunct: November 2015
- Headquarters: Huntingdon, United Kingdom
- Number of locations: 2 offices (2014)
- Key people: David Dunckley; Helen Dale
- Brands: Mastertronic Games; Get Games; Just Flight; Just Trains; The Producers
- Subsidiaries: Sold Out Sales & Marketing Ltd

Mastertronic Group Limited was a software publisher formed as a result of a merger between The Producers and Sold Out Sales & Marketing in 2004. Frank Herman, one of the founders of the original Mastertronic and former chairman of Sega Europe, was involved in negotiations to buy back the name from Sega in 2003. Frank Herman died in 2009 and the company was run by MD Andy Payne and Garry Williams.

Mastertronic Group licensed, published and distributed value PC software under the Sold Out, M.A.D. and PC Gamer Presents labels. They also owned the Everyone Can Play and Great Indie Games labels. Mastertronic closed in November 2015.

== History ==
Mastertronic Group Limited was formed in 2004 out of a merger between The Producers Limited and Sold Out Sales & Marketing Limited. The 'Sold Out' label was retained and used to sell software at the £5 (frequently "3-for-£10") price-point. The company also distributed software under the original 'M.A.D.' imprint, as well as another label associated with PC Gamer magazine. Games on these labels were typically sold for £10 (or "3-for-£20").

Just Flight and Just Trains, both specialist simulation publishers, were acquired by the Mastertronic Group in 2008.

In 2009, Mastertronic Group started the Great Indie Games publishing label to spread independent games, only available on the internet, to shops. Later that year, Mastertronic Group founder Andy Payne entered into a joint venture with Rupert Loman MD of Eurogamer Network and formed Get Games Go (known as Get Games) to market and sell PC games by direct download.

In early 2014, in response to the changing games industry, the Group focused its efforts on its publishing activities. As part of the process, the sales team was spun out to re-form Sold Out Sales & Marketing, led by Garry Williams and James Cato. Sold Out was later acquired by Toadman Interactive in November 2019. Mastertronic Group had also become the sole owner and operator of Get Games.

== Business units ==
Mastertronic Group had five business units: Mastertronic Games, The Producers (manufacturing and fulfilment), Just Flight (Flight and Train Simulations), Blast Entertainment and Get Games.

=== Mastertronic Games ===
Mastertronic published PC & console games under a range of labels, including PC Gamer Presents, M.A.D., Sold Out, Everyone Can Play and Great Indie Games. Recently, the brand has increased output of indie-developed digital titles such as 10 Second Ninja, Epanalepsis, 0RBITALIS, Tango Fiesta, Richard & Alice and Concursion.

=== Get Games ===
Get Games was online retail outlet for digital-download PC/Mac/Linux games from a number of various publishers, both large and small. Get Games also offered periodic bundle sales under the Get Loaded brand.

=== Just Flight & Just Trains ===
Publishes and develops add-on content for the major flight simulation packages such as Microsoft Flight Simulator, Lockheed Martin Prepar3D and X-Plane. The internal development team recently completed work on its English Electric Canberra PR9 add-on and has begun development of a Panavia Tornado add-on.

In a similar vein to Just Flight, Just Trains published and developed add-on content for train simulation packages, primarily RailWorks.

=== The Producers ===
The Producers provided manufacturing, fulfilment and distribution services to the group and third parties.

=== Blast! Entertainment ===
Blast! Entertainment was a publishing joint-venture between Mastertronic and Disky Communications that published budget-priced, licensed-based video games for the PlayStation 2, PlayStation Portable, PC, Wii and Nintendo DS aimed at younger players. The partnership was announced in April 2006, and the company sold its remaining stock c. 2009. Their output included games commissioned by budgeted British developers, which included Casper's Scare School, Casper and the Ghostly Trio, Little Britain: The Video Game, Charlotte's Web, An American Tail, and Mr. Bean. Games published by Blast! were often panned by critics for outdated graphics, unfaithfulness to the license and short length; many titles were labelled as "shovelware".

=== Sold Out ===
Sold Out was a publishing label that published indie games.
