= Spooky the Tuff Little Ghost =

Fictional character

- Casper the Friendly Ghost character
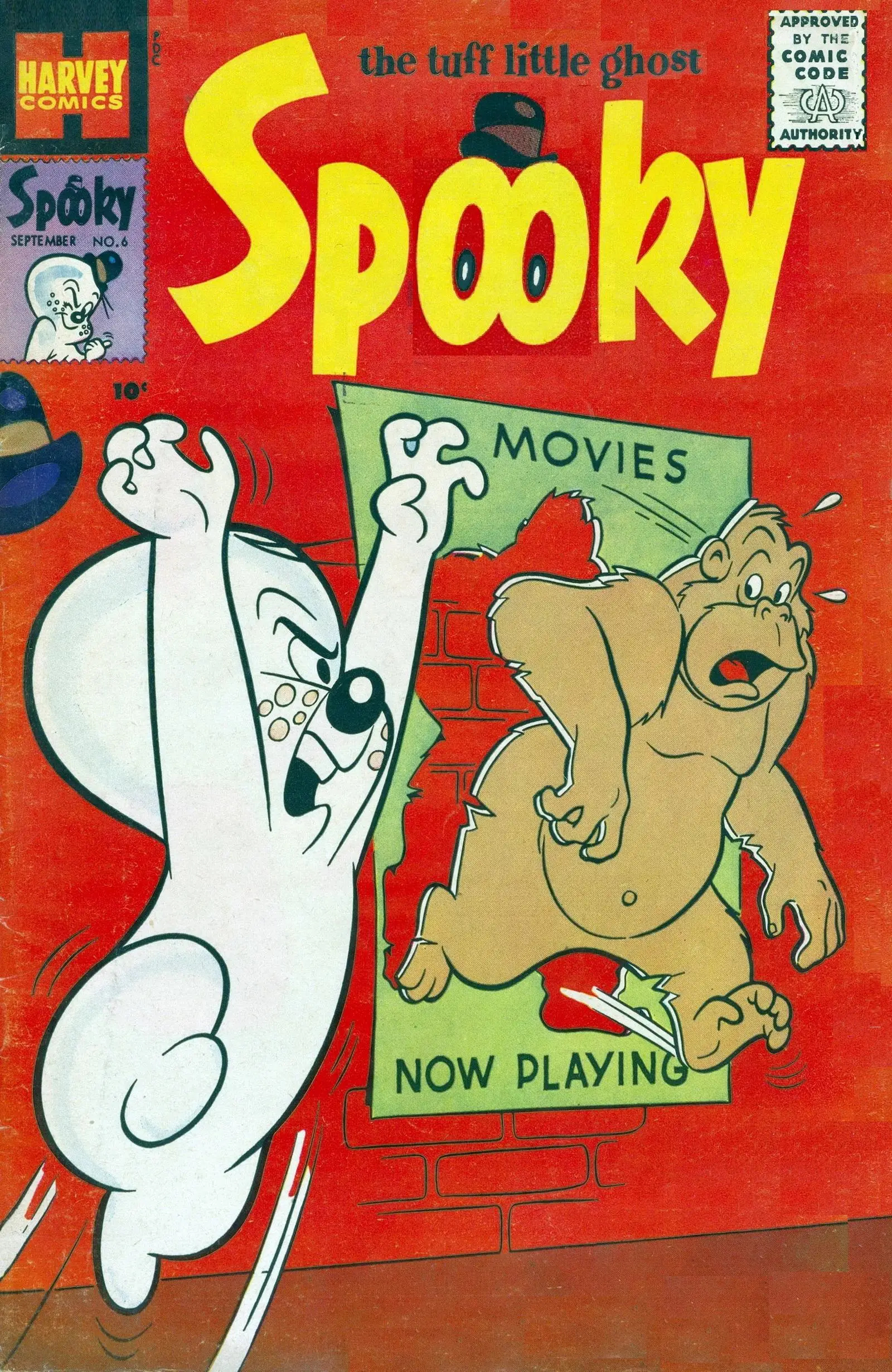
- Cover of Spooky the Tuff little Ghost #6 (September 1956), drawn by Warren Kremer.
- First appearance: "Casper the Friendly Ghost #10"; June 1953
- Created by: Larz Bourne
- Voiced by: Rob Paulsen; Samuel Vincent; Mike Carlsen

In-universe information
- Full name: Spooky
- Species: Ghost
- Gender: Male
- Title: The Tuff Little Ghost
- Significant other: Pearl (girlfriend)
- Relatives: Casper the Friendly Ghost (cousin)

Spooky the Tuff Little Ghost is a fictional character that appeared in titles published by Harvey Comics. Spooky first appeared in Casper the Friendly Ghost #10 (June 1953). He is Casper's cousin, although their exact relation is never specified. He generally resembles Casper except he has freckles, a derby hat, and a large, black nose.

== Publication history ==
Spooky first appeared in the Casper the Friendly Ghost comic book. Though the comic was written and edited by Sid Jacobson and drawn by Warren Kremer, Spooky was created by animator Larz Bourne.

Spooky is written with a Brooklyn accent, for example calling his girlfriend and fellow ghost Pearl, "Poil". His iconic derby hat is, therefore, a "doiby". Although he shares traits with The Ghostly Trio as far as loving to scare the living and being somewhat of a tough guy, he is not as cruel to his cousin as the Trio is, though he occasionally makes fun of Casper for being friendly, and Spooky has his moments of goodwill.

Pearl, who fell in love with Spooky when he rescued her from captivity by abusive witches who were enslaving her in her own house in one comic-book issue, is always trying to stop him from scaring, by reprimanding him, keeping an eagle-eye on him, staying with him all day, threatening to break up with him, or dating other ghost-guys. Whenever she does, she always ends up finding fault with her new date and thinking Spooky is better by comparison, so she returns to him. Spooky is always finding ways to keep his scaring secret from Pearl, sometimes by making it appear that someone else did it.

After several appearances in Casper the Friendly Ghost, Spooky moved to several spin-off titles, including Spooky Spooktown (1961–1976), Spooky Haunted House (1972-1975) and Tuff Ghosts Starring Spooky (1962–1972). The original ran until #161 in September 1980.

== In other media ==
Spooky made four theatrical films with Casper, Hide & Shriek (1954), Hooky Spooky (1957), Which Is Witch (1958), and Doing What's Fright (1959).

Spooky is part of the 1963 animated television series The New Casper Cartoon Show, which ran from 1963 to 1969.

In 1996, after the success of the 1995 Casper feature film, a new animated show, The Spooktacular New Adventures of Casper, premiered on Fox Kids, with Spooky as one of the regular characters, voiced by Rob Paulsen. In the 2000 animated film Casper's Haunted Christmas, Spooky's voice was provided by Samuel Vincent.

Spooky made an appearance in "Scare Bud", a fourth season episode of Harvey Girls Forever!, voiced by Mike Carlsen.

== See also ==
- List of ghosts
