= In Person (American talk show) =

- Also known as: In Person with Maureen O'Boyle
- Genre: Talk show
- Presented by: Maureen O'Boyle
- Country of origin: United States

Production
- Running time: approx. 44 min (without adverts)
- Production company: Telepictures Productions

Original release
- Network: Syndication
- Release: September 9, 1996 – May 21, 1997

In Person with Maureen O'Boyle (or simply In Person) is an American daytime talk show that was hosted by Maureen O'Boyle that ran in syndication from September 9, 1996 to May 21, 1997. The show was produced by Telepictures Productions and is distributed by Warner Bros. Domestic Television Distribution, and after its cancellation, she went on to be a correspondent on Extra.
