= Casper (film) =

1995 film by Brad Silberling

- Theatrical release poster
- Directed by: Brad Silberling
- Written by: Sherri Stoner; Deanna Oliver
- Based on: Casper the Friendly Ghost by Joseph Oriolo (Note: The actual creator(s) of Casper have long been disputed; Joseph Oriolo, Seymour Reit, and Vincent E. Valentine II have all claimed credit for Casper's conception. The end credits state the film as being "based on the character 'Casper the Friendly Ghost' by Joseph Oriolo in the [unpublished short] story by Joseph Oriolo and Seymour Reit".)
- Produced by: Colin Wilson
- Starring: Christina Ricci; Bill Pullman; Cathy Moriarty; Eric Idle
- Cinematography: Dean Cundey
- Edited by: Michael Kahn
- Music by: James Horner
- Production companies: Universal Pictures; Amblin Entertainment; The Harvey Entertainment Company
- Distributed by: Universal Pictures
- Release date: May 26, 1995
- Running time: 100 minutes
- Country: United States
- Language: English
- Budget: $55 million
- Box office: $290 million

Casper is a 1995 American supernatural fantasy comedy film based on the cartoon character Casper the Friendly Ghost. It was directed by Brad Silberling, in his feature directorial debut, and written by Sherri Stoner and Deanna Oliver. The film stars Christina Ricci, Bill Pullman, Cathy Moriarty, and Eric Idle, with the voices of Joe Nipote, Joe Alaskey, Brad Garrett, and introducing Malachi Pearson in his film debut as the voice of the title role. The film follows the title character who peacefully haunts a mansion called Whipstaff Manor in Friendship, Maine, meets and befriends a teenage girl named Kat Harvey, the daughter of Dr. James Harvey, a paranormal therapist who is hired to move into Whipstaff in order to rid the mansion of its spectral inhabitants so that a spoiled heiress can get to the supposed treasures within.

Filming took place from January to June of 1994. Casper makes extensive use of computer-generated imagery (CGI) to create the ghosts. It goes for a darker interpretation of Casper than in previous comics, cartoons, and theatrical shorts, providing the character with a backstory that addresses his death.

Casper was released in cinemas on May 26, 1995, by Universal Pictures. Despite mixed reviews from critics, it was a commercial success, earning $290 million on a $55 million budget. It spawned two direct-to-video prequels from 20th Century Fox Home Entertainment—Casper: A Spirited Beginning (1997), and Casper Meets Wendy (1998)—in addition to an animated television spin-off, The Spooktacular New Adventures of Casper.

== Plot ==
Following the death of her father, neurotic and spoiled heiress Carrigan Crittenden discovers from her father's lawyer Rugg that she has been left only Whipstaff Manor, located in Friendship, Maine, in his will, while his vast wealth has gone to several charities. Carrigan and her lawyer/close friend Dibs find within the will's papers a map that tells of an alleged treasure hidden inside the manor, only to find that the property is haunted by a friendly young ghost named Casper and his poltergeist uncles, the Ghostly Trio. They then unsuccessfully attempt to force the ghosts out by way of exorcism, Ghostbusting, and a demolitions team.

A lonely Casper watches a news report about paranormal therapist James Harvey and instantly becomes smitten with his teenage daughter Kat, prompting Casper to inspire Carrigan to summon James to Whipstaff. Kat dislikes her father's reputation and obsession with contacting the ghost of his late wife, Amelia. The Harveys move into Whipstaff, but Casper's attempt to befriend them fails when they see him. The Ghostly Trio return home and try to torment and scare them away, which eventually fails.

The following morning, Casper gains the Harveys' trust when he serves them breakfast, and follows Kat to school, where she becomes popular when her class learns that she is living in Whipstaff, and agrees to host their Halloween party there. One of her classmates named Amber plots with her friend Vic to humiliate Kat during the party while James attempts therapy sessions with the Ghostly Trio, who reveal that they know Amelia. In exchange for convincing Carrigan to leave them alone, they promise to get James a meeting with his wife.

Kat learns that Casper has no memory of his life and restores his old playroom in the attic to remind him. Casper recognizes an old wooden sled his father bought him and remembers playing outside until he caught a severe cold and died of pneumonia, becoming a ghost to keep his father company. A newspaper article reveals that Casper's father was declared legally insane after he built a machine called the Lazarus which he claimed could bring the dead back to life. Casper and Kat venture to the basement and find the Lazarus. Carrigan and Dibs sneak inside and steal the formula that powers the machine, plotting to use it to grant themselves immortality. However, they attempt to kill each other to test the theory and retrieve the treasure that they think is in the basement's locked vault. This culminates in Carrigan attempting to run Dibs over with her Range Rover, but instead crashing into a cliff-side tree. Upon exiting her car, Carrigan falls to her death and becomes a ghost.

Meanwhile, James becomes depressed after the trio plays a trick on him, prompting them to take him out on the town. They plan to kill him and make themselves a quartet, but they have a change of heart after a drunken James confesses how much he cares for them and vows to let them stay in their home. However, James accidentally falls to his death.

In the laboratory, Carrigan confronts Casper and Kat, stealing what she believes to be the treasure from the vault and launching Dibs out a window when he tries to double-cross her. Carrigan demands to be brought back to life, but Casper and Kat remind her that ghosts are people with unfinished business, and now that she has Casper's treasure, her unfinished business is fulfilled, causing her to be ejected into the afterlife. The treasure is revealed to be Casper's prized baseball, signed by Duke Snider and that the map was part of a game that Casper played with his father. James, now a ghost, returns with Casper's uncles. Seeing Kat's despair over her father's death prompts Casper to sacrifice his one chance to return to life, restoring James instead.

The Halloween party kicks off upstairs; Amber and Vic's prank is thwarted by the Ghostly Trio, and they flee in terror. In his room, Casper is visited by Amelia, who had become an angel after her death. She rewards Casper for his sacrifice by temporarily turning him into a human boy, allowing him to attend the party and dance with Kat. Amelia meets with James, explaining that the Ghostly Trio kept their promise to get him a meeting with her, and tells him that she was so content with her family while alive that she had no unfinished business and thus moved on to the afterlife instead of becoming a ghost.

Amelia departs as the clock chimes ten, promising James that they and Kat will be together again one day. After kissing Kat, Casper transforms back into a ghost, inadvertently scaring the guests away, but Kat is nonetheless impressed with the party. James declares that it is not over yet, and the Ghostly Trio plays their nephew's main theme for them to dance to.

== Cast ==
- Malachi Pearson as the voice of Casper McFadden, a lonely ghost who was originally a 12-year-old boy who died of pneumonia. He spends most of his afterlife in Whipstaff Manor, dealing with the antics of his uncles while hoping to find a friend, and eventually finds one in Kat, while also becoming attracted to her.
  - Devon Sawa portrays Casper in his human form.
- Christina Ricci as Kathleen "Kat" Harvey, Dr. Harvey's 13-year-old daughter and Casper's love interest.
- Bill Pullman as Dr. James Harvey, Kat's widowed father and a ghost therapist interacting with the 'living impaired'. Pullman also voices Harvey's ghost form.
- Cathy Moriarty as Catherine "Carrigan" Crittenden, a greedy woman upset over her late father only leaving Whipstaff Manor to her in his will. She discovers that the house contains a treasure, though never learns it is only Casper's baseball, and hires Dr. Harvey to exorcise the ghosts in order to get it. Moriarty also voices Crittenden's ghost form.
- Eric Idle as Paul "Dibs" Plutzker, Carrigan's attorney and close friend.
- Joe Nipote as the voice of Stretch, the hot-tempered leader and the eldest of the Ghostly Trio.
- Joe Alaskey as the voice of Stinkie, the quietest and middle child of the trio who is known for his odor, particularly his halitosis.
- Brad Garrett as the voice of Fatso, the youngest of the trio who is usually the outlet for Stretch's anger and is known for being obese.
- Garette Ratliff Henson as Vic DePhillippi, Kat's crush and Amber's friend.
- Jessica Wesson as Amber Whitmire, Kat's rival and Vic's friend.
- Amy Brenneman as Amelia Harvey, James' late wife and Kat's mother.
- Ben Stein as Rugg, the lawyer of Carrigan's father.
- Chauncey Leopardi and Spencer Vrooman as Nicky and Andreas, two preteen boys who explore Whipstaff at the beginning of the film.
- Wesley Thompson as Mr. Curtis, Kat, Amber and Vic's form teacher.
- Michael McCarty as a bar drunk.

=== Cameos ===
- Dan Aykroyd as Ray Stantz (uncredited), he was called by Carrigan in an attempt to bust the Ghostly Trio.
- Don Novello as Father Guido Sarducci, he was called in by Carrigan to attempt an exorcism.
- Fred Rogers (archive footage)
- Terry Murphy
- Clint Eastwood
- Rodney Dangerfield
- Mel Gibson
- John Kassir as The Crypt Keeper (voice)
  - Brock Winkless performed the puppetry for the Crypt Keeper in the film.
- Jess Harnell as the voice of Casper's Arnold Schwarzenegger impression.

== Production ==
=== Rights acquisition ===
In 1989, Jeffrey Montgomery, then a 24-year-old student at the USC Marshall School of Business, recognized the value of established intellectual properties such as Star Wars and The Little Mermaid saying they served as their own infomercials for their own commercial tie-ins. With most of the recognized properties held by major conglomerates and the risks and costs associated with establishing new ones, citing the numerous failed attempts of others to copy the success of Teenage Mutant Ninja Turtles, Montgomery set his sights on Casper the Friendly Ghost as he had not only had familiarity with the character from childhood, but noted how Harvey Comics who had bought the character and several others from Paramount Pictures in 1959 for $3 million had done virtually nothing with him. While the Harvey heirs had rejected buyout offers from companies such as The Walt Disney Company, MCA Inc., and King Features Syndicate, Montgomery credits luck and timing with being able to secure the rights as Harvey's TV distribution agreement was set to expire and outstanding third party payments made the Harvey's more agreeable to a sale. Harvey asked for $8 million with Mongomery accepting the offer with $3.4 million in Cash and $4.5 million in promisary notes, $3 million of which came from Mongomery's former class mate and Saudi Prince Ahmad Bin Khalid Al-Saud who became a principal stockholder. In December 1990, following his acquisition of Harvey, Mongomery went to MCA and sold 20% of Harvey Comics' common stock and also entered into a merchandising and licensing agreement for its characters with some exceptions such as Richie Rich whose film rights had already acquired by producer Joel Silver. Then Universal Chairman Tom Pollock was happy to invest in Harvey as he was impressed with his ability to bring to feuding Harvey family into an agreeable bargaining position which MCA had failed to do. As a result of the deal, Harvey licensed the character of Casper the Friendly Ghost to MCA's film division Universal Pictures to develop the character for a feature film project.

=== Development ===
Colin Wilson has said executive producer Steven Spielberg was very passionate about doing a feature film adaptation of Casper the Friendly Ghost due to its themes of loneliness and longing for friendship. He saw an episode of the television series Brooklyn Bridge directed by Brad Silberling and saw potential in this work, recruiting Silberling for directing Casper. Silberling has stated the meeting with Spielberg wasn't actually about Casper and it was about a comedy drama about children and divorce that ultimately never made it out of development. After Silberling moved on to working on NYPD Blue, Silberling received an emergency call from Spielberg that Casper had lost its director and that they needed a new replacement now leading to Silberling in spite of some doubts that the project itself may have been the issue.

Alex Proyas had initially signed on as director, but left due to creative differences with the screenplay. In an interview with Comic Book Resources, he claimed that he was intrigued with doing a children's fantasy, and wanted to do a more dark film, akin to The Wizard of Oz. J. J. Abrams did an uncredited rewrite of the script. The screenplay gave a backstory of Casper being the ghost of Casper McFadden, a boy who died of pneumonia at 12, though some of the comics, particularly in the 1960s, portrayed him as born a ghost to ghost parents. As Silberling was aware of Casper's reputation for being soft and wimpy, Silberling stated to Spielberg that he wanted to have fun with the character by playing with the fact that he's been dead for almost a century and would probably have at least some contemporary sensibility. Spielberg was supportive of the approach. Silberling compared Casper's arrangement of being trapped in the house with his three obnoxious uncles to that of Cinderella, but stated he didn't want to portray Casper as a victim and more as the one who always gets the last laugh on his uncles.

=== Filming ===
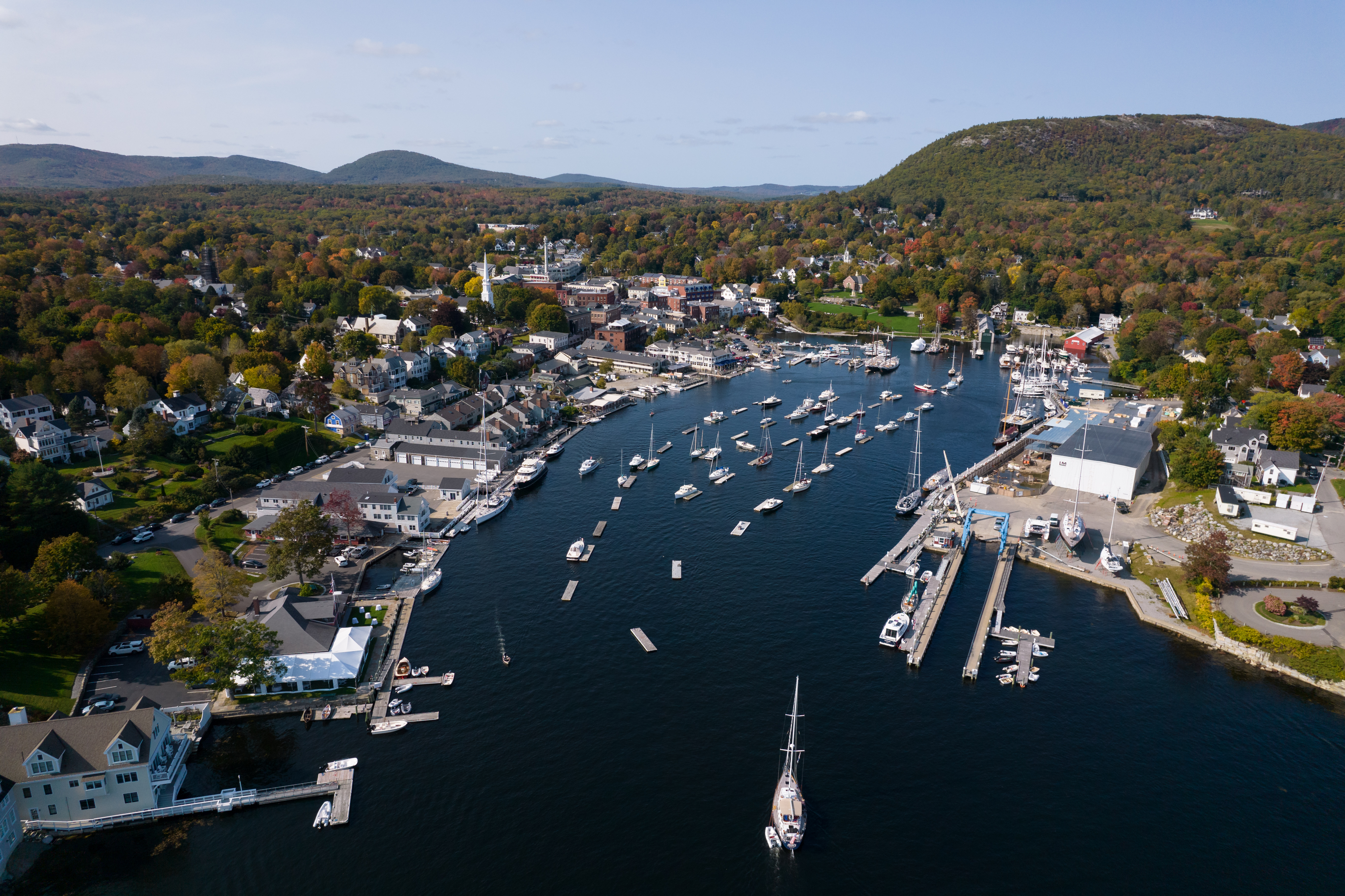
The film was shot in Camden, Maine.

Principal photography began on January 27 and ended on June 8, 1994. Although some location footage was filmed in Camden, Maine, Whipstaff Manor was largely a studio set. Extensive use of computer-generated imagery (CGI) provided by Industrial Light & Magic was used to create the ghosts, and it was the first feature film to have a fully CGI character in a leading role. Silberling would stage the live-action portion of the shots and would then run through them with lead animator Phil Nibbelink, who had worked with Spielberg through Amblimation, and would use an Amiga computer system to compose something similar to a pencil test which would then be uploaded over the live-action footage upon both Silberling and Nibbelink's satisfaction. Silberling compared the program to being a fancier version of MacDraw. One 90-second scene with Casper and Ricci took eight months to create. In the mirror scene, Dr. Harvey was also supposed to transform into Spielberg. According to director Silberling, the cameo was filmed, but was cut for pacing reasons. Spielberg was relieved, feeling that he is not much of an actor himself and was nervous in front of the camera.

Two people have claimed to be the character Casper's sole creator, Seymour Reit and Joe Oriolo, but neither had retained any rights to the character, and Oriolo died years before production on the film began. However, the filmmakers gave Reit a substantial honorarium.

== Soundtrack ==
The soundtrack was composed and conducted by James Horner, who had worked on a number of previous films for Amblin Entertainment, including An American Tail and The Land Before Time, and performed by the Hollywood Studio Symphony. The track "One Last Wish" would go on to accompany Universal Pictures' "Logos Through Time" Montage, as part of their centennial anniversary. The track "Descent into Lazarus" was used in a trailer for How the Grinch Stole Christmas, another film by Universal Pictures and has music by James Horner. The soundtrack was remastered and reissued as a commemorative twenty-fifth anniversary edition by La-La Land Records on August 4, 2020. The soundtrack was originally released however on April 29, 1995, almost five weeks before the film.

Professional ratings
Review scores
Source	Rating
AllMusic	1.5/5 stars
Filmtracks	4/5 stars

Track listing
No.	Title	Artist	Length
1.	"No Sign of Ghosts"		7:31
2.	"Carrigan and Dibbs"		2:40
3.	"Strangers in the House"		2:36
4.	"First Haunting/The Swordfight"		5:01
5.	"March of the Exorcists"		2:45
6.	"Lighthouse—Casper & Kat"		4:56
7.	"Casper Makes Breakfast"		3:41
8.	"Fond Memories"		3:38
9.	"'Dying' to Be a Ghost"		7:02
10.	"Casper's Lullaby"		5:39
11.	"Descent to Lazarus"		10:20
12.	"One Last Wish"		4:19
13.	"Remember Me This Way"	Jordan Hill	4:28
14.	"Casper the Friendly Ghost"	Little Richard	2:10
15.	"The Uncles Swing/End Credits"		6:23
Total length:			1:14:09

== Reception ==
=== Box office ===
Casper opened at #1 over the Memorial Day weekend, grossing $16.8 million over its first three days from 2,714 theaters, averaging $6,205 per theater. Over four days it grossed $22.1 million, averaging $8,140 per theater. It stayed at #1 in its second weekend, grossing another $13.4 million, and boosting its 10-day cume to $38.9 million. It played solidly all through the summer, ending up with a final gross of $100.8 million in the U.S. and Canada, and an additional $187.6 million internationally, for a total worldwide gross of $288 million, far exceeding its $55 million budget and becoming a commercial success. Its 2025 re-release grossed $1.8 million, bringing its total in the U.S. and Canada to $103 million and its worldwide gross to $290 million.

=== Critical response ===
Casper has an approval rating of 59% based on 110 professional reviews on the review aggregator website Rotten Tomatoes, with an average rating of 5.7/10. Its critical consensus reads: "A meandering, mindless family movie that frequently resorts to special effects and transparent sappiness". Metacritic (which uses a weighted average) assigned Casper a score of 49 out of 100 based on 22 critics, indicating "mixed or average" reviews. Audiences surveyed by CinemaScore gave the film a grade "A" on scale of A to F.

Bob Fenster of The Arizona Republic gave it a three out of five rating, stating that "Casper is not Ghostbusters, and it's not The Addams Family. But it does have enough slapstick to amuse kids – and parents – who have a goofy sense of humor". In a two out of four review, David Forsmark of The Flint Journal explained that "this movie needed the touch of a Robert Zemeckis, but even the great special effects fail to mask the pallid direction of Brad Silberling, who makes every other shot look cheap and grainy". Time Out London described it as "an intimate and likeable film". Roger Ebert gave the film three out of four stars, calling it a "technical achievement, it's impressive, and entertaining. And there is even a little winsome philosophy". Robert Firsching of AllMovie gave the film his above average star rating while praising the film for its visual effects.

In his 2015 Movie Guide, Leonard Maltin gave the film a "BOMB" rating, objecting to the portrayal of Casper as a deceased child rather than a ghost.

=== Accolades ===
Award	Date of ceremony	Category	Recipient(s)	Result	Ref.
Kids' Choice Awards	May 11, 1996	Favorite Movie	Casper	Nominated	
Saturn Awards	June 25, 1996	Best Performance by a Younger Actor	Christina Ricci	Won	
Saturn Awards	June 25, 1996	Best Fantasy Film	Casper	Nominated	
Stinkers Bad Movie Awards	1996	Worst Picture	Universal Pictures	Nominated	
Young Artist Awards	1996	Best Performance by a Young Actor: Voiceover Role	Malachi Pearson	Won	
Young Artist Awards	1996	Best Family Feature: Musical or Comedy		Nominated	
Young Artist Awards	1996	Best Young Leading Actress: Feature Film	Christina Ricci	Nominated	

== Home media ==
Casper debuted on VHS and LaserDisc on October 10, 1995. It was successful in the home video market, and finished in the top-20 best-selling videos of 1996 in the United States. A UK VHS release premiered on August 19, 1996, by CIC Video. A DVD version was released on September 23, 2003. A Blu-ray version was released on September 2, 2014. A new 4K remaster of the film was released on 4K Ultra HD Blu-ray on August 12, 2025, to celebrate its 30th anniversary, with a theatrical release of this version then following starting on October 3, 2025. By May 1997, it was reported that Casper had brought in an additional $325 million from home video revenue along with an additional $300 million in associated merchandising sales.

== Legacy ==
The success of Casper secured Silberling the job of directing the 1998 film City of Angels, a remake of Wings of Desire. A brief clip from Casper is seen in the 2024 film Sonic the Hedgehog 3, in a scene in which Knuckles the Echidna gets scared by the titular ghost while watching the film during one of Sonic's movie nights.

=== TV shows ===
An animated series, The Spooktacular New Adventures of Casper, was released in 1996 based on the film. Fatso (season 1–2), Stinkie, Stretch and Casper were all voiced by the actors from the film, while Dr. Harvey was voiced by Dan Castellaneta, and Kat by Kath Soucie.

In 2006, Classic Media produced another television film based on the character called Casper's Scare School. The film features Casper being sentenced to a school that will teach him how to scare others. In 2009, the film spawned a spin-off animated series with the same title.

A new live-action television series was announced to be in development at Peacock in 2022, co-produced between Universal Content Productions and DreamWorks Animation with Wu Kai-yu writing and executive producing. The series ultimately did not move forward. Instead a new series, inspired by Netflix's Wednesday, was announced for Disney+ in 2026, and set to be executive produced by Steven Spielberg, Rob Letterman, and Hilary Winston.

=== Prequels ===
With Harvey Entertainment retaining prequel rights to Casper, 20th Century Fox Home Entertainment, in co-production with Saban Entertainment, released two direct-to-video follow-ups to the film; Casper: A Spirited Beginning (1997) and Casper Meets Wendy (1998).

=== Cancelled sequel ===
Following the release of Casper, Simon Wells co-wrote a screenplay for Casper 2, which he was set to direct. However, in July 2000, Universal Pictures cancelled the sequel due to the disappointing sales from the direct-to-video Casper films and the hesitation of Christina Ricci.

=== Animated direct-to-video film ===
In 2000, Harvey Entertainment returned once with Mainframe Entertainment to produce a film called Casper's Haunted Christmas. Released by Universal Studios Home Video, the film was made with computer animation, as opposed to its live-action predecessors.

=== Cancelled CGI film reboot ===
In 2013, DreamWorks Animation announced that they were rebooting Casper as a computer-animated reboot film, with Simon Wells, who at one point was previously attached to write and direct the unproduced sequel to the live-action film, to write and direct once again, with writing duo John Altschuler and Dave Krinsky (King of the Hill, Blades of Glory) to co-write the film's script. It was set to be DreamWorks' second attempt at an animated film based on characters from the Classic Media library, but nothing came of it since its announcement. Concept art for an unproduced film was posted on ArtStation by animator Danny Williams in December 2023, stating that the pitch "never went anywhere".

=== Video games ===
There were multiple video games based on or tied-in with the film released on the major consoles of the time, such as the 3DO, Super NES, Sega Saturn, PlayStation, Game Boy Color, and original Game Boy. A Casper game for the Sega Genesis was planned but never released. An LCD handheld game was released for Tiger Electronics in 1995.

== See also ==
- List of films set around Halloween
- List of ghost films
- List of live-action films based on cartoons and comics
- The Frighteners – 1996 film by Peter Jackson
