= Tuff Ghosts Starring Spooky =

Tuff Ghosts Starring Spooky is an American comic book series, published by Harvey Comics. The series ran from July 1962 to October 1972; in all, 43 issues were published.

Tuff Ghosts Starring Spooky featured stories from Harvey Comics' stable of characters, focusing primarily on Spooky the Tuff Little Ghost. Backup features included Casper the Friendly Ghost, The Ghostly Trio, The Witch Sisters and Wendy The Good Little Witch.

Tuff Ghosts had an irregular publishing history. Ostensibly a bi-monthly publication, it was not unusual to see many months between issues. Four issues were published in 1969 (#33-36), three in 1970 (#37-39), two in 1971 (#40-41) and two in 1972 (#42-43). The series was a standard-sized 32-page comic book, with the exceptions of issues #40–42, which were "Giant-Size" 52-page issues.

Tuff Ghosts was canceled in October 1972, at a time that saw an increase in Harvey Comics titles, including the Casper and Spooky team-up series that began the same month that Tuff Ghosts was canceled. Another Spooky title, Spooky Haunted House, began the same month.
