= Jerry Penacoli =

American journalist

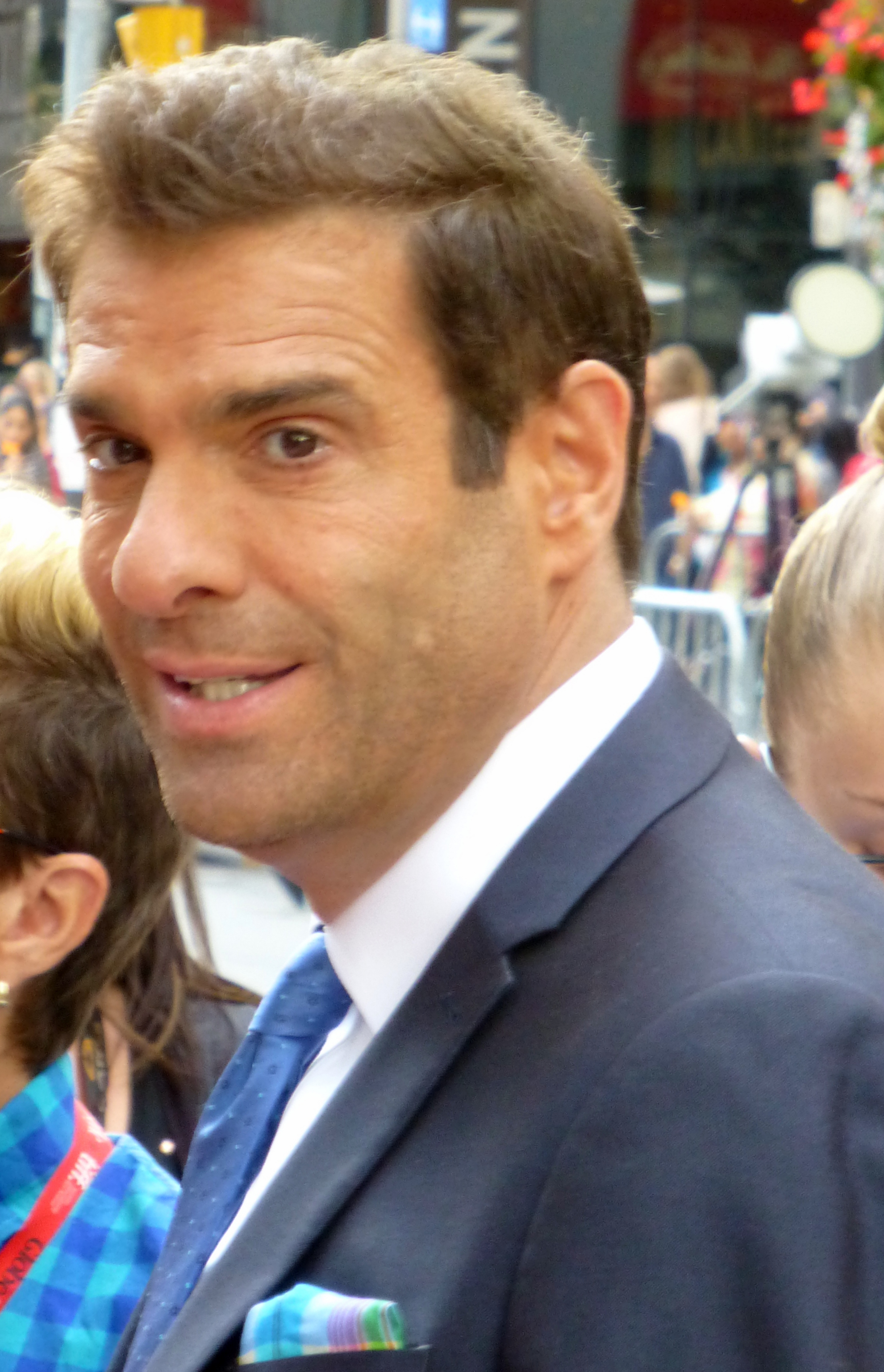
- Born: July 9, 1956 (age 70); Scranton, Pennsylvania, U.S.
- Occupations: Actor, reporter
- Years active: 1982–present

Jerry Penacoli (born July 9, 1956) is an American actor and entertainment reporter, and served as a host with the US syndicated magazine show Extra for 20 years.

== Early life and education ==
Penacoli was born in Scranton, Pennsylvania, and grew up in the Marlton section of Evesham Township, New Jersey. He attended grade school at St. Joan of Arc grade school in Marlton and high school at Holy Cross High School in Delran Township, New Jersey. He went on to the University of Bridgeport in Connecticut, where he studied journalism and communications and graduated summa cum laude in 1978.

== Reporting career ==
Before going national, Penacoli served as a newscaster and talk show host in several markets starting in Jacksonville, Florida, then WTVJ in Miami, where Jerry served as host of PM Magazine in the early 1980s, and then Philadelphia. He was an evening news anchor for the Philadelphia TV station KYW-TV (an NBC affiliate at the time), from the mid-1980s until he moved to New York City in 1990, and also did double duty during his final two years at KYW as host of their local talk show People Are Talking. He later relocated to Hollywood in 1992.

Penacoli worked on the tabloid show Hard Copy from 1996 to 1999. He also served as the first male host of Lifetime's "Attitudes" with Linda Dano. Prior to Warner Brothers, his broadcasting career included stints at E! Entertainment television, where he hosted the entertainment network's live coverage of premieres and events, and Paramount Television. He also co-hosted Richard Simmons' Dream Maker with Richard Simmons and Kat Carney in Fall 1999. As of February 4, 2013, Penacoli has served as co-host on the syndicated morning television program Daytime out of Tampa, Florida, which is seen in more than 130 U.S. markets.

== Acting career ==
His credits include several daytime soaps as principal characters and guest-starring roles on numerous sitcoms and dramas as well as film roles, including Woman on Top with Penélope Cruz and Galaxy Quest with Tim Allen and Sigourney Weaver.

Penacoli was a special guest as the host of The Scoop in an episode of Williams Street's Tim and Eric Awesome Show, Great Job!.

== Personal life ==
Penacoli resides in the Tampa Bay area of Florida and is an artist in his spare time. In 2011, Penacoli revealed on Extra that he was diagnosed with stage three melanoma, resulting in surgery and protracted hospitalization. He was also diagnosed with early-stage thyroid cancer at that time. Penacoli later announced to viewers that he had been declared cancer-free. In 2016, he successfully underwent open heart surgery.
