= Casper and the Ghostly Trio (video game) =

2006 video game

- Australia and New Zealand PlayStation 2 cover art
- Developer: Data Design Interactive
- Publisher: Mastertronic Group (Blast! Entertainment)
- Engine: Havok
- Platform: PlayStation 2
- Release: PlayStation 2: Germany: 15 September 2006
- Genre: Platformer
- Mode: Single-player

Casper and the Ghostly Trio is a 2006 platform game developed by Data Design Interactive and published by Blast! Entertainment. It is based on the Casper the Friendly Ghost character by Harvey Comics.

== Plot ==
The game finds Casper following the calamitous trail of his mischievous uncles the Ghostly Trio, who have kidnapped Wendy the Good Little Witch to use her magic for evil.

== Gameplay ==
Casper and the Ghostly Trio is an action-adventure platform game that has the player exploring 3-D environments, defeating monsters and collecting keys to progress. The game contains six levels and five bonus levels. Unlike previous Casper video games, the game does not have Casper fly; he can instead perform a short-length glide to traverse over wide gaps.
