= Maureen O'Boyle =

American television newscaster

- Born: Maureen Jeralyn O'Boyle; July 14, 1963 (age 63); Charlotte, North Carolina
- Years active: 1981–present
- Children: 1

Maureen Jeralyn O'Boyle (born July 14, 1963) is an American television reporter and news anchor. She was the lead anchor for WBTV News 3 in her hometown of Charlotte, North Carolina and used to anchor the weekly "Stretching Your Dollar" report. On May 2, 2022, she announced that she was leaving WBTV in June 2022. O'Boyle has been the anchorwoman for the TV shows A Current Affair and Extra.

== Early life ==
O'Boyle was born in Charlotte, North Carolina. She is one of ten children; her oldest brother Johnny died when he was a toddler. Growing up, her father's work for Xerox had the family moving almost every two years from New York to England until they finally settled back in Charlotte, where her father started a specialty advertising company called Timeplanner Calendars. O'Boyle's six brothers eventually took over the family business, grew it to a multimillion-dollar company, and sold it in summer 2007.

O'Boyle graduated from West Charlotte High School in 1981 and studied journalism at East Carolina University.

== Early career ==
In her freshman year at East Carolina University, O'Boyle helped restart the campus radio station WZMB. She was also hired to do morning cut-ins at the NBC affiliate in nearby Washington N.C. station WITN. She later went to work for WNCT in Greenville on weekends. O'Boyle left school before graduating, and was hired by WECT in Wilmington, North Carolina, where she worked as a nightside reporter and was promoted to noon anchor. Her next stop was WMAZ in Macon, Georgia, as co-anchor and reporter. She left that station to become main anchor for the CBS affiliate, KREM 2 in Spokane, Washington.

== Professional career ==
In 1990, at age 27, O'Boyle was recruited to replace Maury Povich on the nationally syndicated A Current Affair. Its viewership rose by 15 percent, and she rated a higher Q Score than any other newswoman on TV at the time. O'Boyle hosted A Current Affair until 1994, when she was replaced by Penny Daniels.

In 1995, she became weekend anchor and reporter of Los Angeles-based TV series Extra. O'Boyle left Extra in 1996, and hosted her own talk show In Person, which ran for one season (after which she returned to Extra and became co-anchor until September 1997). She appeared as herself in the films So I Married an Axe Murderer and Undisputed. In 1999, O'Boyle left television to be a full-time mother. In 2004, she returned to her hometown to join WBTV as the station's top female anchor, alongside Paul Cameron. She has been the station's main anchor and de facto face since Cameron's retirement in 2018.

She played herself in a 1998 episode of The Larry Sanders Show, in which she interviewed Garry Shandling's lead character.

== Personal life ==
In 1992, O'Boyle revealed to People that on April 3, 1986, in Macon, Georgia, a man had broken into her apartment and raped her. The man was arrested after committing a second rape and sentenced to 50 years in prison. O'Boyle told People, "I've always thought that being in a job where I am in the public eye that my story is important to share".

In 1999 O'Boyle gave birth to her daughter Keegan. She brought her daughter to the "Extra" set every day and had a crib for Keegan in her office. After contract negotiations with Warner Brothers fell through, O'Boyle left the industry and retreated to a 100-year-old cabin in Hurley, New York.

O'Boyle works with numerous charities, including the American Red Cross, Assistance League of Charlotte, Second Harvest Food Bank of Metrolina, American Heart Association, Dress for Success, and Community Blood Center of the Carolinas. She appeared on a charity edition of Who Wants to Be a Millionaire in November 2010, where she and her co-anchor raised $48,000 for the Greater Enrichment Program, an after-school program for at risk youth.
