= Joan Lovett =

American journalist (born 1960)

Joan M. Lovelace (born November 12, 1960), known professionally as Joan Lovett, is a former American television news anchor. Lovett worked in TV news in markets including Miami and Chicago from 1980 to 1999. After her career, she struggled with substance abuse and became a writer.

== Early life and education ==
A native of St. Louis, Missouri, and Rockford, Illinois, Lovett earned a bachelor's degree in radio/TV news and print journalism from Southern Illinois University in Carbondale in 1983. She received a Master's of Fine Arts in writing from Lindenwood University.

== Professional career ==
Shortly after graduating from SIU-C, Joan began her career in broadcast journalism at WICD in Champaign, Illinois, from 1983 to 1986. From Champaign, she moved on to WTLV in Jacksonville, Florida. She hosted Good Morning Jacksonville for the station and was on air when the station's news helicopter crashed during a morning traffic report in June 1986, reporting the aftermath. After being passed over for a slot hosting a new 5:30 p.m. weekday newscast, she departed WTLV in July 1988 to become the noon news anchor at WSVN in Miami. She was promoted to a spot on the 5:30, 6:30, and 10 p.m. newscasts in May 1990, and in 1991 she and Penny Daniels were assigned to host a new news and entertainment program, 7:30.

Lovett left Miami at the end of 1992 after being hired by WBBM-TV in Chicago as a weekend anchor, taking maternity leave for her first child between the jobs. WBBM intended her as a replacement for Elizabeth Vargas. Daniels joined her at WBBM. When the two started in April, they were instead assigned to anchor a planned 4 p.m. newscast; that never went ahead, but a relaunched noon newscast did, with Lovett and Daniels co-anchoring. Later that year, she began co-anchoring the station's 6 p.m. newscast with Bill Kurtis. She moved from that newscast in late 1994 to make way for the station's hiring of Mary Ann Childers, and in 1996, Lovett began co-anchoring WBBM's new 6 a.m. newscast. When WBBM expanded the newscast, after rehearsals it decided to demote Lovett and elevate Childers to her post. By late 1998, she was anchoring at 5 and 11 a.m.

In late 1998, Lovett obtained an early release from her contract with WBBM. In early 1999, Lovett and her husband, Jeff Abrams, moved to the Baltimore area, where he took a behind-the-scenes news operations job at WBAL-TV.

== Struggle with alcoholism ==
Lovett suffered from alcoholism in the late 1990s and early 2000s—a condition that was exacerbated, she told CBS News in 2004, by her lack of work. After a series of drunk-driving arrests, Lovett was jailed in the Baltimore area in August 2002. While she was in prison, on October 10, 2002, Lovett's husband Abrams died aged 46 of an apparent heart attack while jogging. Lovett's request to attend her husband's funeral was denied. Lovett was released from jail in April 2003 and told CBS News in 2004 that she had completed substance-abuse counseling. Joan has been sober since 2004.

By 2010, she was focusing on a career in writing and teaching part-time, as well as raising her two children.
