= Warwick Moss =

- Born: Warwick Tennant Moss; Sydney, New South Wales, Australia
- Education: Newington College
- Occupations: Actor; television presenter; dramatist; playwright

Warwick Tennant Moss is an Australian actor, television personality and presenter and dramatist and playwright as well as New South Wales Premier's Literary Award winning writer for the stage.

== Early life ==
Moss was born in Sydney and attended Newington College (1958–65), commencing as a preparatory school student in Wyvern House.

== Theatre ==
In 1984 Moss produced, directed and acted in his own play Down An Alley Filled With Cats. This mystery thriller won the New South Wales Premier's Literary Awards for Theatre and had productions throughout Australia, as well as the on West End and in New York. It is published worldwide by Samuel French. In London he appeared in the Royal Command premiere of Stephen Sewell's play Dreams in an Empty City.

== Film and Television credits ==
Moss has appeared in Come In Spinner, Scales of Justice, Mother and Son, Police Rescue, G. P., The Flying Doctors, Punishment, Blue Murder, Evil Angels (A Cry in the Dark) and Danny Deckchair. In 1993 he hosted the national television show The Extraordinary, which ran for four years and was sold to over 70 countries. He later parodied this persona in a 2007 commercial for ANZ, in his trademark deep, mysterious voice, saying "How do I unlock equity from my home?". From 1998 to 2005 Moss directed, wrote and/or hosted the documentaries Pure Gold, Australia and The Olympic Games, Australia's Most Haunted Town, and The Reincarnation Experiments. He also produced and acted in the film version of his play Blood-Shot. In 2006 he produced, shot, wrote and hosted his own three-part documentary Inside The Outback.

Warwick Moss also presented the Ten Network home improvement and renovations program Bright Ideas every Saturday between 12 noon and 2 p.m for a number of years.

== Advertising ==
In 1989 Moss became creative director of John Singleton Advertising. In 2007 Moss was commissioned by McCann Erickson Advertising to direct, write and Voice the entire National Party television campaign for the New South Wales State Elections.

== Directing ==
In 2020 Warwick Moss had his directorial debut with A War of Compassion, a feature-length documentary about the humanitarian work of Australian Uniting Church minister Bill Crews.
