= A Current Affair (American TV program) =

American television newsmagazine program (1986–1996, 2005)

- A Current Affair logo.
- Genre: Television news magazine
- Presented by: Maury Povich (1986–1990); Maureen O'Boyle (1990–1994); Jim Ryan (1994); Penny Daniels (1994–1995); Jon Scott (1995–1996); Tim Green (2005)
- Country of origin: United States
- Original language: English

Production
- Executive producer: Peter Brennan
- Editor: Burt Kearns
- Running time: 22–24 minutes
- Production companies: 20th Century Fox Television (1986–1992); 20th Television (1992–1996, 2005)

Original release
- Network: Syndication
- Release: July 28, 1986 – August 30, 1996
- Release: March 21 – October 28, 2005

A Current Affair is an American television newsmagazine program that aired in syndication from July 28, 1986, to August 30, 1996, before it was briefly rebroadcast from March to October 2005. The program was produced by Fox Television Stations, and based at Fox's New York City flagship station WNYW, starting as a local production in 1986. It was syndicated to Fox's other owned-and-operated stations the next year, and then went into full national syndication in September 1988.

Its signature "ka-chung" sound effect was created using a combination of the snap of a construction paper cutter and the swing of a golf club put through a synthesizer.

== Overview ==
The program was originally hosted by Maury Povich. In the fall of 1990, Maureen O'Boyle replaced Povich and continued to host until May 1994. Jim Ryan then became interim host for the summer of 1994. Penny Daniels became host for the 1994–95 season and for what ultimately became the show's final season, Jon Scott subsequently took her place. Its creator and producer was Peter Brennan. One of its lead personalities was Steve Dunleavy, a columnist for the New York Post; at the time of the show's launch the Post, WNYW, Fox Television Stations and syndicator 20th Television were units of the original iteration of News Corporation.

Initially, the program was broadcast as an irreverent, late-night broadcast on WNYW, but as it expanded, and under the direction of Brennan and producers Burt Kearns and Wayne Darwen, the program began to cover stories throughout America that were overlooked or ignored by the then-dominant network news organizations.

The logo of the program is a distinctive pyramid with a "zoom-like" sound effect (immortalized as the "ka-chung") for a theme. While showing some hard news stories, the focus of the program is often entertainment, scandals, gossip and exploitative tabloid journalism. It was popular during the 1990s when magazine-type news shows were common during daytime television. Its main competitors were Hard Copy and Inside Edition (the latter of which remains on the air today), along with the many talk shows that dominated daytime TV during the 1990s.

== Revival ==
On March 21, 2005, the program was revived after a nine-year hiatus. Former Atlanta Falcons defensive end and lawyer Tim Green hosted the new edition, unofficially known as ACA 2. In resurrecting the show, 20th Television gave it a more serious tone by covering more news and crime, rather than entertainment-oriented stories. As with its original incarnation, overt politicizing was left out of the new program. It aired on all Fox owned and operated stations (O&Os including UPN affiliates). This resurrection would be short- lived, however, as Lachlan Murdoch's departure from Fox and his replacement by 20th Television chairman Roger Ailes led to Fox's announcement that Ailes would replace the program with Geraldo at Large in November 2005, only seven months after ACA 2 premiered.

Suspicions that Ailes pulled the program because the ACA team was competing with, and sometimes besting, his cable Fox News, were intensified in October 2005, when, after its cancellation was announced, ACA broadcast an exclusive interview with Natalee Holloway murder suspect Joran van der Sloot, and Geraldo Rivera revealed to the press that Ailes planned to use the timeslot as a beachhead for the establishment of a Fox News nightly newscast.
