= Casper's Haunted Christmas =

- DVD cover
- Directed by: Owen Hurley
- Written by: Ian Boothby; Roger Fredericks
- Based on: Casper the Friendly Ghost by Seymour Reit; Joe Oriolo
- Produced by: Byron Vaughns
- Starring: Brendan Ryan Barrett; Kathleen Barr; Ian James Corlett; Graeme Kingston; Terry Klassen; Scott McNeil; Tegan Moss; Colin Murdock; Tabitha St. Germain; Lee Tockar; Samuel Vincent
- Narrated by: David Kaye (rhyming scene only)
- Edited by: Andrew Duncan
- Music by: Robert Buckley
- Production companies: The Harvey Entertainment Company; Mainframe Entertainment
- Distributed by: Universal Studios Home Video (United States); The Harvey Entertainment Company (International)
- Release date: October 31, 2000
- Running time: 86 minutes
- Countries: United States; Canada
- Language: English

Casper's Haunted Christmas is a 2000 animated Christmas supernatural black comedy film produced by The Harvey Entertainment Company and Mainframe Entertainment, based on the character Casper the Friendly Ghost, and was released in the United States by Universal Studios Home Video on October 31, 2000. Unlike either its theatrical or two direct-to-video predecessors, which combined live-action and CGI, the film was fully made in computer animation. It stars Brendon Ryan Barrett (who previously starred in Casper: A Spirited Beginning as Casper's best friend, Chris Carson) as the voice of the title character. Randy Travis provided original music.

== Plot ==
After a scaring spree at a drive-in theater, the Ghostly Trio are confronted by Casper who is then confronted by Officer Snivel who informs him that his scare quota is down. The Trio take Snivel's whistle and blow it which summons Kibosh, the perfidious King of Ghosts. Kibosh explains Casper must intentionally scare one person a year; the cowardice from humans just seeing Casper doesn't count. He threatens to send them to a void called The Dark if Casper fails to scare someone by December 25. To make sure Casper scares someone, he confiscates the Trio's haunting licenses and flings them to the Christmas-influenced town Kriss, Massachusetts, on account of the Trio's hatred of the holiday, where they meet the Jollimore Family. When Casper's good behavior starts to act up, which includes befriending the daughter of the family, Holly, the Ghostly Trio call in Casper's lookalike cousin Spooky, who brings along his girlfriend Poil, to do the job disguised as Casper in the hope of fooling Kibosh.

With Casper and Spooky unlikely to scare someone after a series of failed attempts the Trio decide to plot a scaring spree stealing every Christmas present in Kriss, in a reference to How the Grinch Stole Christmas!, and taking them to the Jollimores' house where they plan to lure the townspeople then set off scary booby traps to go out with a bang before being banished to the Dark. Casper along with Spooky and Poil scare the Trio using a fake Kibosh made from the Jollimores' giant Santa. Casper then summons the real Kibosh using Snivel's whistle to inform him he scared the Trio, fulfilling his ghostly obligation, but Snivel informs Kibosh of the booby traps, violating the no scaring order on the Trio. To prevent Kibosh from banishing them to the Dark, the Trio claim the traps are a Christmas gift for Kibosh; since he enjoys watching torture, the trio spring them. After the act, Kibosh accepts the Trio's claim and returns their haunting licenses before leaving with Snivel. The film ends with the remaining ghosts celebrating Christmas with the Jollimore family.

== Cast ==
- Brendon Ryan Barrett - Casper
- Tegan Moss - Holly Jollimore
- Scott McNeil - Stretch, Noel Jollimore
- Graeme Kingston - Fatso
- Terry Klassen - Stinkie
- Samuel Vincent - Spooky
- Tabitha St. Germain - Poil
- Colin Murdock - Kibosh
- Lee Tockar - Snivel
- Kathleen Barr - Carol Jollimore
- Ian James Corlett - Little Kid
- David Kaye - Narrator (rhyming scene only)

== Crew ==
- Ian Boothby - co-writer
- Roger Fredericks - co-writer
- Kris Zimmerman - voice director
- Byron Vaughns - producer
- Owen Hurley - director

== Marketing ==
In the United States, Baskin Robbins, whose logo is featured on an ice cream store in the film, made a tie-in promotion with the VHS release of Casper's Haunted Christmas, by inventing a Casper-themed ice cream flavor that was available throughout December. The chain also inserted a coupon good for free ice cream sundaes inside every video.

== Music ==
A soundtrack featuring original country-styled covers of classic Christmas songs that also feature in the film, such as Winter Wonderland, Deck the Halls, and Jingle Bell Rock, performed by country artists Ricky Van Shelton and Randy Travis, among other pre-existing Christmas country covers, was made to accompany the film's release, under Koch Records.

Additionally, the original Casper the Friendly Ghost theme can be heard in the opening sequence of the film performed by Travis, and is also included in the soundtrack.

== See also ==
- List of ghost films
- List of Christmas films
