= Last Shot with Judge Gunn =

American reality court show (2011–2013)

- Genre: Reality-based nontraditional court show
- Developed by: Matt Battaglia; George Jones; Peter Brennan
- Starring: Mary Ann Gunn; Lisa Dennis; Michael McHenry; Mary Scheele; Kim Weber; Bobby McDonald
- Country of origin: United States
- Original language: English

Production
- Executive producers: Peter Brennan; Matt Battaglia; George Jones
- Production location: Fayetteville, Arkansas
- Running time: 22 minutes
- Production companies: Matt Battaglia Productions; Caravan Entertainment Partners; P&L Productions; Trifecta Entertainment & Media

Original release
- Network: First-run syndication
- Release: September 26, 2011 – July 12, 2013

Last Shot with Judge Gunn is an American reality-based nontraditional court show that debuted in syndication on September 26, 2011. The series is presented by Mary Ann Gunn and distributed by Trifecta Entertainment, with Peter Brennan, Matt Battaglia, and George Jones serving as executive producers on this series, with Lisa Lew as Co-Executive Producer, and Justin Page and Terry Powell as Supervising Producers.

In 2012, after only its first season on the air, it won a Daytime Emmy Award for Outstanding Legal/Courtroom Program. To date, this is the earliest into production that any court show has ever received a Daytime Emmy Award. Moreover, it is the first nontraditional courtroom series to receive a Daytime Emmy Award. On May 1, 2013, Last Shot with Judge Gunn had again been nominated for the "Outstanding Legal/Courtroom Program" Daytime Emmy Award, but did not win the second time around.

== Details ==
The drug court series features former Washington County, Arkansas, Circuit Judge Mary Ann Gunn offering people who had been convicted of various drug offenses and minor acts an alternative to prison, and hopefully, a "Last Shot" at redeeming their lives. The concept was based on a local television program that she instituted when she was on the bench in 2006, and utilizes the Washington County Courthouse in Fayetteville for the tapings on Saturdays. However at the same time, Gunn's concept has been criticized in legal circles, which had been controversial during her tenure and since her resignation from the bench.

The programs many legal-based and support group detractors have heavily attacked the court show as not being a real-life drug court, noting that its "defendants" are actually post-adjudicated offenders who have been sentenced to probation, not to any state or federal Drug Court; they agree to be cast on the show in return for money for treatment and other expenses. On September 22, 2011, the National Association of Drug Court Professionals (NADCP) released a Position Statement criticizing Last Shot with Judge Gunn for misrepresenting itself as drug court and casting individuals while they are involved in substance abuse treatment.
