= Carter Jackson =

Carter Jackson is an actor based in New York City.

== Live performances ==
He has appeared on Broadway in the Paul Newman starring production of Our Town by Thornton Wilder, directed by James Naughton. Carter played SAM CRAIG in the Westport and the Booth Theater productions, as well as in the televised American Classics production which followed on Showtime and PBS. Carter also originated the role of TAP in the short play Leaving Tangiers by David Johnston, which was a winner in the 28th Annual Off-Off Broadway Original Short Play Festival in 2003 and published by Samuel French. Carter is a member of off-off-Broadway's Blue Coyote Theater Group as one of their Repeat Offenders, recently appearing in their evening of one-act plays titled Happy Endings, in Such A Beautiful Shoulder by John Yearley and Yes Yes Yes by David Johnston.

== Voice-Over Performances ==
Carter voiced the role of Conor for the third television adaptation of Speed Racer, titled Speed Racer: The Next Generation, for Nicktoons Network. Carter also provided the voice of Thatch in the first season of the television series Casper's Scare School, but not in the direct-to-video movie on which it is based.
