= Bill Crews (minister) =

Australian Christian minister

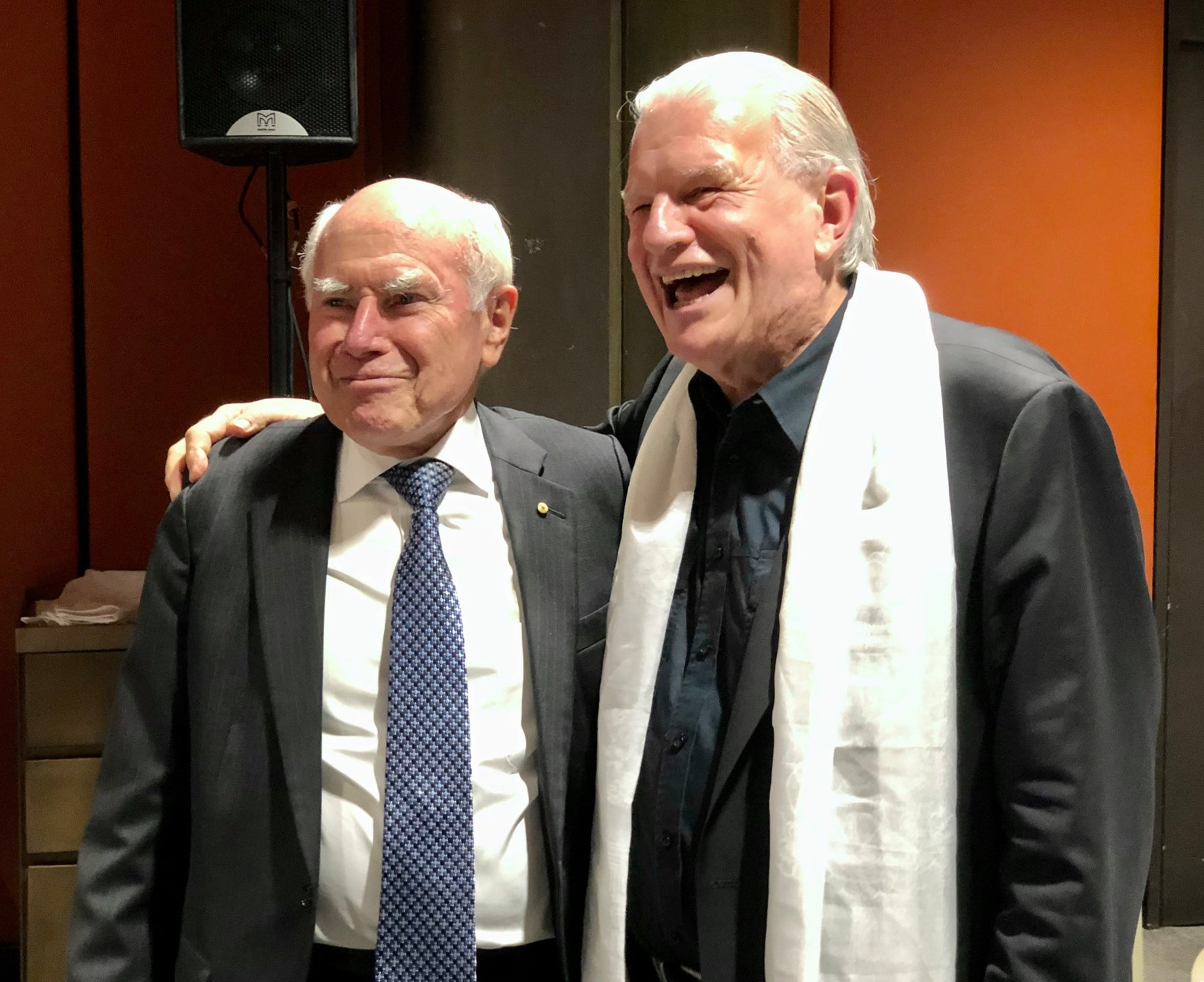
Bill Crews (right) with former Prime Minister John Howard

William David Crews AM (born 1944) is an Australian Christian minister of the Uniting Church. He has been the minister of the Ashfield parish in Sydney's Inner West since 1984.

== Biography ==
Bill Crews was born in England in 1944 and migrated to Australia with his family in his early years. He studied electrical engineering at the University of New South Wales under a scholarship provided by AWA. He worked with AWA in microelectronic research studying the properties of silicon until 1971, including building the first machine in Australia to grow ultra pure single crystal silicon.

In late 1969, he first visited the Wayside Chapel in Kings Cross and ultimately became involved in voluntary programs, visiting the elderly, sick and shut-ins of the Woolloomooloo-Kings Cross area.

By 1971, he had decided to quit engineering and work full-time at the Wayside Chapel. Crews was a member of the team that created the first 24-hour crisis centre in Australia. By 1972 he was director of the crisis centre and directed all the social work programs of the Wayside Chapel until 1983. During that time he established the first program in Australia to reunite adoptees and birth parents (Reunion Register), and the first program to assist parents who were at risk of abusing their children (Child Abuse Prevention Service). He also established the first modern youth refuge in Australia.

In 1973, he was made a member of the New South Wales Drug and Alcohol Authority and was intimately involved in establishing drug rehabilitation, education and prevention programs throughout New South Wales. In 1978, together with Ted Noffs, he created the first Life Education Centre. More have since spread all over Australia, Hong Kong, Thailand, New Zealand, England and America, promoting drug avoidance and harm minimization strategies.

After leaving the Wayside Chapel, Crews went into the Uniting Church ministry and eventually became minister at the Uniting Church in the Sydney suburb of Ashfield. He then became founder and chairman of the Exodus Foundation, a charity that assists homeless and abandoned youth. He is also the founder and CEO of the Bill Crews Charitable Trust. The Exodus Foundation's activities include a free kitchen, or restaurant, in Ashfield which feeds 400 people each day, health both dental and medical and welfare services for the homeless and needy, and an outreach program for homeless youth. There is also a night food van providing meals to the homeless at Woolloomooloo.

From 1996 to 2014, Exodus (in collaboration with MULTILIT) operated a literacy program which offered free remedial reading tuition to disadvantaged primary school children, with tutorial centres located in Ashfield, Redfern, Coen, Queensland and Darwin, Northern Territory. The NSW State Government terminated funding to the program on 30 September 2014, and the Ashfield and Redfern centres closed soon after, although The Bill Crews Trust continues to operate a literacy program for indigenous students in the Northern Territory.

Since 2002, Crews has hosted the radio program Sunday Night with Bill Crews on Sydney radio station 2GB and Brisbane radio station 4BC. Guests have included Clive James, Helen Reddy, Bob Hawke, and Kerry O'Brien. He is known to have a centre-left political viewpoint. Crews was the subject of a documentary film released in 2020, A War of Compassion, directed by Warwick Moss.

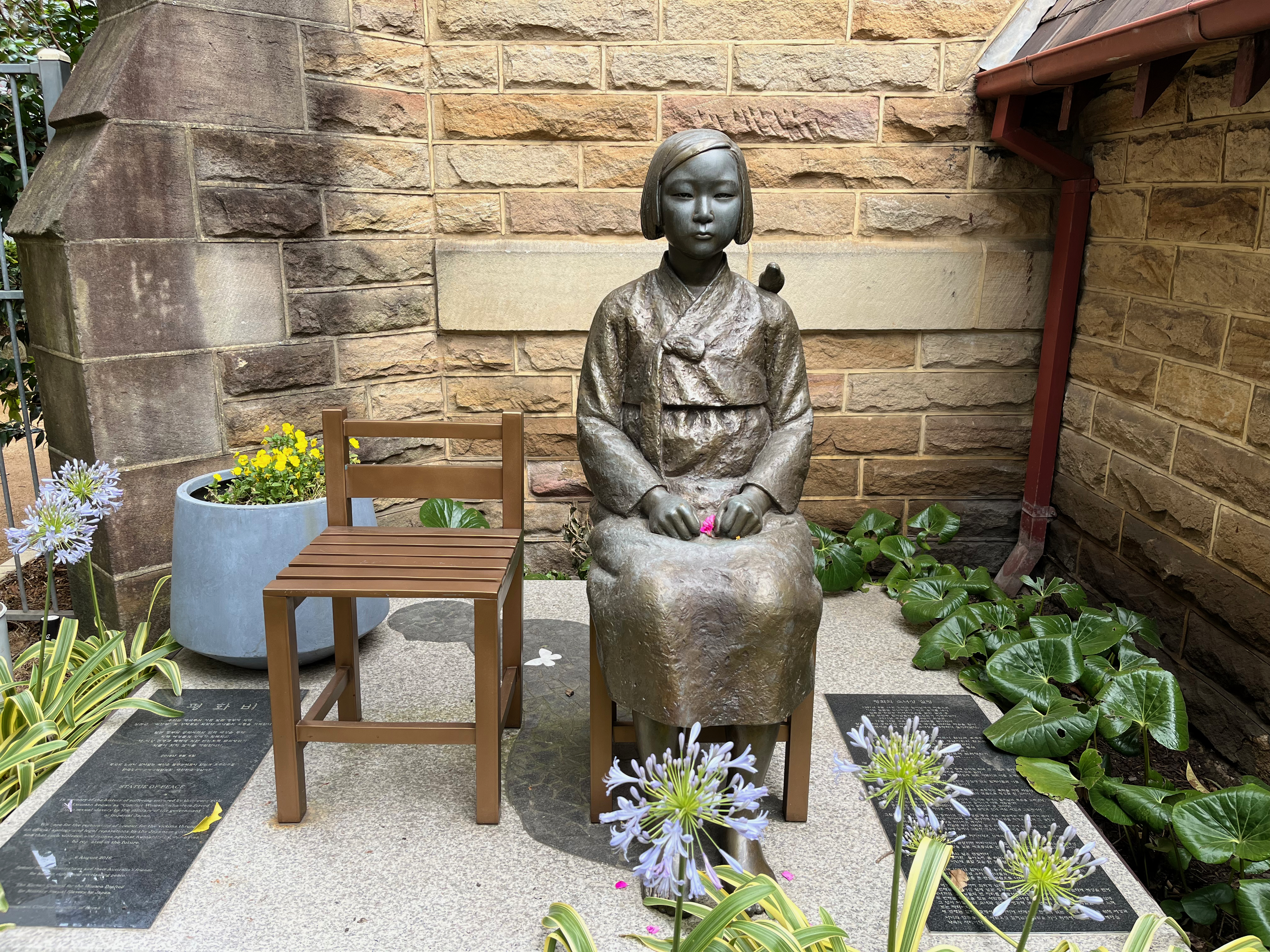
Statue of Peace at Ashfield Uniting Church

In 2016, Crews accepted the installation of a statue outside his church commemorating Korean women who were sexually enslaved by the imperial Japanese army, after it had been rejected by the local council.

== Awards and honours ==
Crews has been awarded an International Paul Harris Fellow by the Rotary Foundation. He has been voted Father of the Year and Humanitarian of the Year (1992). In February 1998 Crews was included in the National Trust of Australia's 100 "National Living Treasures". In 1999, he was appointed a member of the Order of Australia (AM) for his services to the disadvantaged and his work with homeless youth.

As part of the 2000 Summer Olympics, Crews ran a leg of the Olympic Torch Relay and the Paralympic Torch Relay. He also distributed hundreds of donated tickets to those who would otherwise not have had the financial means to partake in the Olympic experience.

In 2001, Crews was named Ashfield Citizen of the Year for his contribution to the local community. He received the William R. Tresise Fellowship Award from the Australian Lions Foundation in June 2001 – the highest honour the Foundation bestows for humanitarian services. In 2001, Crews also received an Alumni Award from the University of New South Wales.

Crews is a patron of Australians For Just Refugee Programs and chairman of Fair Go Australia – an anti-racism project sponsored by the NSW Government through the Community Relations Commission.

== Personal life ==
Crews has been married twice and has four adult children. He has described both marriages as failed marriages. His second wife, Gillian Armstrong-Crews, died of liver failure in 2025. She had become infected with hepatitis C from a blood transfusion during the birth of her first child in 1985.
