= In Person (Canadian TV program) =

- Genre: Variety
- Written by: Peter Mann; Gerry O'Flanagan; Alfie Scopp
- Country of origin: Canada
- Original language: English
- No. of seasons: 2

Production
- Producer: Mark Warren
- Running time: variable

Original release
- Network: CBC Television
- Release: 17 December 1966 – 11 May 1968

In Person is a Canadian music variety show that aired on CBC Television from 1966 to 1968.

== Premise ==
Regulars included Jimmy Dale's house band and vocalists the In Singers. For the first season, each episode featured a different host such as Alex Barris, Tommy Common, Doug Crosley, Don Francks, Wally Koster, and Gordon Pinsent. Guests in that season included Dave Broadfoot, Cy Leonard, Billy Meek, The Staccatos, and Flip Wilson.

For the second season (1967–1968), Alan Hamel became a regular host. Guests that season included Tommy Ambrose, Jack Duffy, Ian and Sylvia, Gordon Lightfoot, and Rich Little. Some episodes were recorded at Expo 67 in Montreal, as the program often ventured outside the normal studio setting.

== Scheduling ==
This program was broadcast on Saturday nights following Hockey Night in Canada to cover the available time slot until CBC's national newscast that night. Its debut was 17 December 1966 and ran until 11 May 1968, with the program interrupted between television seasons during mid-1967.
