= Terry Murphy (broadcaster) =

American TV host & broadcaster (b.1948)

- Born: 1948 (age 77–78); Columbus, Ohio, U.S.
- Occupation: Television presenter
- Years active: 1976–2003

Terry Murphy (born 1948) is an American television host and correspondent, best known for her nine years (1989–1998) anchoring the tabloid show Hard Copy and, since 2003, reporting for the entertainment show Extra. Previously, she was a news anchor at WLS-TV in Chicago (1976–1980), and at KNXT/KCBS-TV (1980–1984) and KABC-TV (1984–1987), both in Los Angeles; she later returned to KCBS (1987–1989) before moving on to Hard Copy. Terry Murphy also worked for WJBK-TV (CBS) Detroit in the early 1970s. She appeared in a natural acting role as herself, on Married... with Children in the episode "Shoeway to Heaven" (1994).

== Personal life ==
Murphy, a native of Columbus, Ohio and a Delta Gamma alumnus, lives in Los Angeles and is the divorced mother of two sons. Graduated from the University of Cincinnati in 1972. She recently got remarried to Murray Levy, a former security officer for Nicolas Cage.

Murphy was an active fundraiser in Big Bear Lake, CA, where she served as host for the March of Dimes Celebrity Ski Classic from 1993–1996. Murphy had a second home there at the time, where her son, Justin Timsit, ski raced with the Snow Summit Race Team.

Murphy was born Terry Chellis. She went to Bishop Hartley High in Columbus and was 1966 Miss Ohio.
