= Casper's Scare School (video game) =

2008 video game

- Developers: Data Design Interactive (PS2); Nikitova Games (NDS)
- Publishers: EU: Blast! Entertainment; NA: Crave Entertainment
- Platforms: PlayStation 2, Nintendo DS
- Release: PlayStation 2: EU: February 1, 2008; Nintendo DS: EU: November 14, 2008; NA: October 26, 2010
- Genre: Adventure
- Modes: Single-player, multiplayer

Casper's Scare School (Casper's Scare School: Classroom Capers for the Nintendo DS version) is an adventure video game developed by Data Design Interactive for the PlayStation 2 and Nikitova Games for the Nintendo DS and was based on the 2006 film of the same name. The game was released in Europe in 2008 and in North America in 2010. It reuses similar assets to its 2006 predecessor, Casper and the Ghostly Trio, which was only released in Europe. A sequel titled Casper's Scare School: Spooky Sports Day was released for the Nintendo DS and Wii in Europe in 2009 and North America in 2010.

== Plot ==
The plot involves Casper the Friendly Ghost, who having been sent to "Scare School" by his three uncles, must thwart plots by the school bully Thatch the vampire's plan to turn all the characters to stone, stop Casper helping his classmates or stealing all the glory in the school sports day.

== Gameplay ==
=== PlayStation 2 ===
The PlayStation 2 version is a 3D adventure game with elements of a platformer and a racing game. In the first level, Casper's suitcase has bust open throwing its contents around his mansion, so he has 400 seconds to find the 30 items before the school bus leaves to take him to Scare School. This layout of this level is reused from the Great Hall level in the 2006 game Casper and the Ghostly Trio being from the same developer. The second level is similar to Crazy Taxi in which the player has 120 seconds to navigate the boat to collect six classmates around Deedstown. The next three levels are a series of three-lap races between Casper, his friends Ra, Mantha, Mickey, and Monaco along with the school bully Thatch. The first race is around the school grounds, the second through the school corridors as well as the grounds and the third in the gym with polls to jump over. In the final level Thatch has turned Casper's four friends, from the previous races, into stone. Casper must find each friend turning them back into themselves and get to his mansion before Thatch does. The game also features a multiplayer mode in which any of the six racing characters can be played in the lap races. The entire game can be finished in 22 minutes.

=== Nintendo DS ===
Casper must complete three classes, science with Professor Thurdigree Burns, history with Hedy Hopper and gym with Frankengymteacher, per week for eight weeks earning four marks in each session, earning a C grade or higher, within the time limit. It is played with the DS being held sideways in a similar style to the Brain Age series, but with just the stylus. To get his marks Casper must get what he needs by trading with his classmates giving them things they want before returning to his desk or gym mat to complete the assignment. Casper must avoid the teacher who watches certain parts of the classroom at a time, the Gargoyles who patrol the classroom, Thatch who thinks Casper is being too friendly and Kibosh who oversees the classes in the final week. This is the only time Thatch is seen in his bat form in the games. If any enemies catch Casper out of a desk (Casper's own desk in the case of Kibosh) he will be sent back to his desk, any item he is holding will be confiscated and he has to start the task again. Casper can earn bonus marks by scaring Thatch with a beetle blast or the teacher with a Power Bolt. As Casper progresses through the game the classroom gets bigger with new classmates added as well as new enemies and new power-ups.
