= Hard Copy (TV program) =

American tabloid news television series

- Genre: Infotainment
- Created by: Mark Monsky; John Parsons Peditto
- Presented by: Alan Frio (1989–1991); Terry Murphy (1989–1998); Barry Nolan (1991–1998); Kyle Kracha (1998–1999)
- Theme music composer: David Mansfield
- Composer: Dan Siegel
- Country of origin: United States
- Original language: English
- No. of seasons: 10
- No. of episodes: 2,159

Production
- Executive producers: Kim Paul Friedman (1995–1999); Peter Brennan (1990–1993); Mitchell L. Gamson; Lisa Gregorich (1996–1999); Marky Monsky (1989–1990); William Sackheim; Ron Vandor (1995–1999)
- Producers: Mary Aloe; Burt Kearns; Lisa Lew (1989–1992)
- Running time: 22 min
- Production company: Paramount Domestic Television

Original release
- Network: Syndication
- Release: September 18, 1989 – September 10, 1999

Hard Copy is an American tabloid television show that ran in syndication from 1989 to 1999. Hard Copy was aggressive in its use of questionable material on television, including gratuitous violence.

The original hosts of Hard Copy were Alan Frio and Terry Murphy. Frio left the series after the 1990–91 season and was replaced by Barry Nolan in the fall of 1991. Nolan and Murphy would stay until after the 1997–98 season, when they both departed. In the show's final season, Kyle Kracha was the sole host.

Hard Copy was produced and distributed by Paramount Domestic Television and, for much of its time on air, was often aired with its sister show, the Hollywood news program Entertainment Tonight as part of an hour-long programming block sold to local stations.

== Overview ==
Hard Copy was a tabloid show that aired footage and news about celebrities and everyday people. Also featured were interviews with various newsmakers.

=== Murder of Dag Drollet ===
Hard Copy had been the first program to report on the 1990 shooting of Dag Drollet. Prior to the shooting, the Brandos and the Drollets had been longtime friends. Marlon Brando hoped to break the news gently to Jacques Drollet, father of Dag. However, Drollet learned of his son's death as Hard Copy had reported in Tahiti in a rush to beat out other news outlets.

=== 1992 Elton John lawsuit ===
In 1992, Elton John threatened to take Hard Copy to court, alleging a reporter tried to blackmail him into giving an interview by falsely claiming he had HIV/AIDS and had moved to Atlanta to be near an AIDS treatment center. John alleged extortion, defamation, right to privacy and endangerment.

The day after the lawsuit was filed, the show ran a segment about John but, rather than accuse him of having HIV, praised him for the work he was doing for those affected by the disease. John's attorney at law told National Enquirer he "assume(d) the show was changed as a result of our suit".

=== Simpsons spoof ===
Fox aired The Simpsons episode "Homer Badman" on November 27, 1994. After Homer is mistakenly embroiled in a local scandal, the entire incident devolves into a media frenzy. As a result, Homer takes part in a Hard Copy-like show called Rock Bottom. The show distorts Homer's case and it takes public-access television, and aid from Groundskeeper Willie, to clear Homer's name. The episode ended with Rock Bottom issuing a series of corrections.

=== 1996 celebrity boycott ===
In 1996, actor George Clooney began a public boycott of both Hard Copy and Paramount's celebrity news show Entertainment Tonight after Hard Copy violated a six-month agreement not to air segments about Clooney by airing footage of Clooney and then-girlfriend Celine Balitran on the set of the film Batman & Robin. Other celebrities supporting the boycott included Whoopi Goldberg, Madonna, and Steven Spielberg. Paramount eventually agreed to modify the way that both shows gathered information for their stories. They also agreed not to air "unauthorized footage" of celebrities or "footage that is known to have been obtained illegally."

== Hosts ==
- Alan Frio: Host (1989–1991)
- Terry Murphy: Host (1989–1998)
- Barry Nolan: Host (1991–1998)
- Kyle Kracha: Host (1998–1999)
- Remy Blumenfeld: London Correspondent (1991–1996)
- Jerry Penacoli: Reporter (1996–1999)
- Pat Lalama: Reporter (1996–1999)
- Edward Miller: Reporter (1996–1999)
- Doug Bruckner: Reporter
- Rafael Abramovitz: Correspondent
- Diane Dimond: Reporter
- Roger Lodge: Correspondent

== International versions ==
An Australian version of the series hosted by Gordon Elliott aired in 1991.

A New Zealand version of the series hosted by Natalie Brunt (now Natalie Chetkovich) and, later, Pip Groves aired in 1995-96.
