= The MoShow =

The MoShow is an American syndicated television news program which reviews mobile devices, apps, downloads and text messages. Premiering on January 1, 2011 on over 300 television stations throughout the United States and on DirecTV Channel 354, it is hosted by Mark Yoshimoto Nemcoff (of Pacific Coast Hellway) and Dana Ward (of ClevverTV), with production by Frank Chindamo.
