= The Extraordinary =

- Genre: Mystery
- Written by: Warwick Moss
- Presented by: Corbin Bernsen; Warwick Moss
- Theme music composer: Brett Robinson
- Country of origin: Australia
- Original language: English

Production
- Executive producer: Peter Sutton Peter Brennan
- Cinematography: Craig Watkins
- Production company: Peter Brennan Productions Showboat Entertainment Pty Ltd

Original release
- Network: Seven Network
- Release: 1993 – 1996

The Extraordinary is an Australian television documentary series that featured stories of the paranormal and supernatural. It ran on the Seven Network from 1993 to 1996.

== History ==
The show was hosted by Warwick Moss, who would narrate to the audience "true life" tales of the paranormal. Stories on the show revolved around a wide variety of subjects including alien abduction, ghosts, tales of clairvoyance and cryptozoological creatures such as the yowie. The show had a distinct local slant, with stories on the 1987 Nullarbor UFO incident or the appearance of a headless ghost in a music video for the Australian band 1927.

The Extraordinary was one of very few Australian programs to crack the US Market. In the United States it ran as a syndicated program from 1994 until 1996, hosted by Corbin Bernsen.

== Episodes ==
1. Telly Savalas' ghost story, death pool aboriginal legend, soldier ghost photograph, killer whale conspiracy, blind psychic.

== See also ==
- List of Australian television series
