= Casper's Scare School (TV series) =

Animated television series

- Based on: Casper the Friendly Ghost by Joseph Oriolo, Seymour Reit and Vincent E. Valentine II
- Directed by: Eric Bastier (season 1); William Renaud (season 2)
- Voices of: Season 1: Robbie Sublett Vanessa Belladini Carter Jackson Goldie Zwiebel Justin Pavia Kevin Mahr Juanny Paulino Donna Coney Island Shelly Smith Shenoy; Season 2: Matthew Géczy Sharon Mann Mirabelle Kirkland Shelly Smith Shenoy
- Composers: Noam Kaniel; Lars Segoni
- Countries of origin: United States; France; India
- Original languages: English; French
- No. of seasons: 2
- No. of episodes: 52 (104 segments)

Production
- Executive producers: Christophe di Sabatino; Benoît di Sabatino; Nicolas Atlan (season 1); Eric Ellenbogen; Deborah Dugan (season 1); Doug Schwalbe; Tapaas Chakravarti
- Producers: Kevin Gamble (season 1); Ceri Barnes (season 2); Maïa Tubiana (season 2)
- Running time: 22 minutes (2 11-minute segments)
- Production companies: MoonScoop; Classic Media; DQ Entertainment

Original release
- Network: Cartoon Network (United States); TF1 (France)
- Release: October 5, 2009 – November 8, 2012

Casper's Scare School (also known as Casper's Scare School: The Animated Series) is an animated television series based on the animated film of the same name featuring the Harvey Comics cartoon character Casper the Friendly Ghost. The series premiered in Canada on YTV on January 11, 2009, and then in France on TF1's TFOU block on April 1, and later in the United States on Cartoon Network on October 5 the same year.

A second season aired in 2012 with a new opening sequence, a new voice cast and a slightly different CGI animation style. 52 episodes were produced.

== Premise ==
Casper has to be able to graduate from the Scare School before he gets banished to the valley of the shadows forever. He goes on many adventures with the students that attend there.

== Characters ==
- Robbie Sublett (season 1) and Matthew Géczy (season 2) as Casper
- Carter Jackson (season 1) and Sharon Mann (season 2) as Ra
- Vanessa Bellardini (season 1) and Mirabelle Kirkland (season 2) as Mantha
- Carter Jackson (season 1) and Matthew Géczy (season 2) as Thatch
- Mike Power (season 1) and Matthew Géczy (season 2) as Kibosh
- Joe Sheridan as Fatso
- Matthew Géczy as Stinky and Stretch
- Adam Carter (season 1) and Mirabelle Kirkland (season 2) as Jimmy Bradley
- Graham Thomas (season 1) and Matthew Géczy (season 2) as Alder
- Robert Williams (season 1) and Matthew Géczy (season 2) as Dash
- Johann Geoffrey Nelson (season 1) and Matthew Géczy (season 2) as Wolfie
- Matthew Géczy as Prof. Thurdigree Burns, Frankengymteacher "Coach", Slither, and Pumpkinhead (season 2)
- Goldie Zwiebel (season 1) and Sharon Mann (season 2) as Hedy Hopper
- Joe Sheridan (season 2) as Cappy
- Shelley Shenoy (season 1) and Sharon Mann (season 2) as Mickey
- Juanny Paulino (season 1) and Sharon Mann (season 2) as Monaco
- Kevin Mahr (season 1) and Matthew Géczy (season 2) as Mosshead
- Shelly Smith Shenoy (season 1) and Sharon Mann (season 2) as Dummy Girl
- Johann Geoffrey Nelson (season 1) and Matthew Géczy (season 2) as Quasi
- Shelly Smith Shenoy (season 2) as Flyboy Maggoty
- Sharon Mann (season 2) as Triclops
- Justin Pavia (season 1) and Shelly Smith Shenoy (season 2) as Harpy
- Kevin Michael Richardson as Goo

== Production ==
The series is co-produced by Classic Media, MoonScoop Group and DQ Entertainment, with participation from TF1, Harvey Entertainment (as an in-name only unit since Classic Media acquired their library in 2001) and CNC.

The complete first season aired between October and November 2009.

The second season premiered on October 2, 2012, on Cartoon Network featuring a new title theme, recasting all the voices and with new edited CGI animation. One of the new voice actors was Matthew Geczy who starred in Code Lyoko, another French production. Jimmy's voice is similar to the film version. The characters whose voices dramatically changed were Casper, Thatch, Stinky, Stretch, Wolfie and Alder, all voiced by Geczy, given a voice similar to his character, Odd Della Robbia from Code Lyoko. Geczy also voices numerous other characters. Many other actors from said show also worked on it such as Mirabelle Kirkland who voiced Yumi Ishiyama in Code Lyoko and plays Mantha and Jimmy in the second season. Some background characters were given larger roles and speaking roles and the personalities of some characters have changed, mostly with Thatch having a tender side of playing with rubber ducks.

== Episodes ==
=== Series overview ===
Season	Episodes	Originally released	
Season	Episodes	First released	Last released
1	26	October 5, 2009	November 12, 2009
2	26	October 2, 2012	November 8, 2012

=== Season 1 (2009) ===
No. overall	No. in season	Title	Original release date
1	1	"Fang Decay"	October 5, 2009
1	1	"Scare Day"	October 5, 2009
Thatch has got fang-ache. Casper tries taking him to the school nurse, but the only helpful way is taking him to a fleshie dentist. Casper's attempts to help Mantha win a scaring competition backfire. Meanwhile Alder and Dash try to get into the competition. This is the first time Casper shows signs of romantic feelings for Mantha.
2	2	"Disarmed and Dangerous"	October 6, 2009
2	2	"Frankenleftovers"	October 6, 2009
Mantha replaces her arm with a tentacle that seems to be causing trouble at school. Meanwhile the boys keep finding vandalism at night and suspect it to be caused by Mantha. Casper makes a creature out of cafeteria leftovers, but the beast proves difficult to control.
3	3	"Bully for You"	October 7, 2009
3	3	"The Raminator"	October 7, 2009
Casper forms a secret squad to end bullying at school. Casper helps Ra seem more athletic, but his kindness could lead to trouble after Ra is challenged to complete a dangerous task.
4	4	"Weekend at Bunny's"	October 8, 2009
4	4	"Grimly Day"	October 8, 2009
Casper tries to protect a bunny that frightens Alder and Dash. The kids undergo scariness testing.
5	5	"Accidental Hero"	October 9, 2009
5	5	"Rich Kid Ra"	October 9, 2009
Casper's uncles give him scaring tips that end up working too well. Ra gains popularity after kids at the school find out he's rich. Thatch, Alder, and Dash try to claim Ra's riches.
6	6	"Dragon Quest"	October 13, 2009
6	6	"Opposite Day"	October 13, 2009
Casper goes to a medieval-themed restaurant with Professor Burns, who's seeking revenge against the knights there. A botched experiment changes the students' personalities, such as the mean people as nice people.
7	7	"Scare Scouts"	October 14, 2009
7	7	"Boo!"	October 14, 2009
Casper joins a scout troop but is dismayed by their mission to scare people. Thatch is stuck at a Halloween party in Deedstown.
8	8	"Abraca-Deedstown"	October 15, 2009
8	8	"Shrinky Dust"	October 15, 2009
Ra and Mantha encourage an overwhelmed Casper to be less helpful, but it could affect Jimmy's magic show. A bully gets magic shrinking dust, putting the whole town in peril.
9	9	"Bands on the Run"	October 16, 2009
9	9	"Vote for Casper"	October 16, 2009
A battle of the bands divides Casper, Mantha and Ra. Kibosh pressures Casper to run for Class Representative, but Casper doesn't want to betray Mantha, who's also running.
10	10	"Permission Impossible"	October 19, 2009
10	10	"What Possessed You?"	October 19, 2009
Ra sneaks away on a camping trip and ends up lost in the woods with Casper and Mantha. Norman takes Casper's ghostly form and causes trouble. While the whole thing is happening, Alder & Dash use this as a way to avoid punishment from Kibosh.
11	11	"Merry Scary Christmas"	October 20, 2009
11	11	"Time Waits for No Ghost"	October 20, 2009
Casper is supposed to spread bad cheer in Deedstown, but he really wants to spend time with Jimmy during Christmas. The students overuse a clock that stops time until it breaks and everyone is stuck in time.
12	12	"Ghost Bust a Move"	October 21, 2009
12	12	"My Fair Harpy"	October 21, 2009
Casper and friends haunt Jimmy's house in an effort to stop the Bradley family from moving. Ra takes Harpy to the school dance, where Ra plans to be named king. However as Thatch heard about the award of the dance, he is determined to become king.
13	13	"Fleshed Out"	October 22, 2009
13	13	"Messy Business at the Manor"	October 22, 2009
Wolfie turns into a human, much to his horror, and could be expelled from Scare School. Mosshead proves to be an annoying houseguest.
14	14	"Paramedic Paranormal"	October 23, 2009
14	14	"Back to Ghoul"	October 23, 2009
Jimmy goes to the hospital to treat his hives, but Casper's friends distract the staff, leaving Jimmy neglected. Casper's uncles return to Scare School and land Casper in hot water as a result of their constant pranks.
15	15	"2,500 Candles for Ra"	October 26, 2009
15	15	"It's a Mad, Mad, Mad Underworld"	October 26, 2009
Feeling neglected on his birthday, Ra goes to the museum to visit his mummy friends. The trip turns perilous when the exhibit is packed up for a new location. Copies of Cappy's treasure map flood the school, leading to an all-out treasure hunt.
16	16	"Curse of the Sandwich"	October 27, 2009
16	16	"A Real Little Monster"	October 27, 2009
Ra thinks he's becoming a vampire after he bites Thatch's sandwich. Casper hides Jimmy in Scare School to protect him from Norman, but he may have to guard Jimmy from the students as well.
17	17	"Curse of the Sarchophogas"	October 28, 2009
17	17	"Whiz Kid Ra"	October 28, 2009
Ra gets a fancy new sarcophagus, a hi-tech device that's difficult to control. Ra uses the Answertorium for a test, but his new genius status puts Wolfie in peril.
18	18	"Dimension Demented"	October 29, 2009
18	18	"The Taming of the Gloutch"	October 29, 2009
Ra gets stuck in the Dimension Tube, which Casper tries to fix before Ra is gone forever. The kids raise gloutches for a school project. Casper and Thatch have problems raising their gloutches as these have the opposite of their personalities.
19	19	"Ring My Bell"	October 30, 2009
19	19	"First Mate Caspar"	October 30, 2009
Casper takes over Quasi's job as punishment for persuading him to go on strike. Casper becomes Cappy's first mate but has trouble adjusting to life on the sea.
20	20	"Power Outage"	November 2, 2009
21	21	"Power Outage"	November 3, 2009
A monster is loose in the school, stealing the powers of all the teachers and students with the help of a magic crystal. When the students succeed in capturing the creature, it turns out this was all a test by Kibosh. But when he wants to return the powers to the students, his friend, a Leprechaun named Razznik, steals the crystal. Razznik has taken the powers of all students, except Casper. The students and teachers of the Scare School all flee to Deedstown. Casper enlists the help of Jimmy and his dad to get the crystal back.
22	22	"Ghost in the Gallery"	November 4, 2009
22	22	"Wart on the Nose"	November 4, 2009
A ghost stole an artwork from Deedstown Gallery. It turn out a man inside a white sheet over his head. When Professor Thurdigree Burns come down with the dragon flu, Casper, Mantha and Ra are tasked with finding a cure.
23	23	"Revenge of the Creature Catcher"	November 5, 2009
23	23	"Slugby"	November 5, 2009
Jimmy's dad thought that Casper, Ra and Mantha as "evil" creatures, so he went to the Underworld. The students and staff divided into teams against each other in the game of Slugby (a parody sport of rugby).
24	24	"You Oughta Be in Pictures"	November 6, 2009
24	24	"Crypt Critters"	November 6, 2009
Mantha thought that the actors of the director's recent movie were real zombies, so she led an army that zombies are like everyone else, turned out that it was a bad idea. Mantha has crypt critters (parody pest of lice), so Casper has to find a solution to put end of Mantha's itchiness.
25	25	"The Reflesherator"	November 10, 2009
25	25	"Master Blister"	November 10, 2009
Flyboy's dad replaces Professor Thurdegree Burns as a Science teacher and wants Flyboy to turn back into fleshies/humans together. After Alder & Dash punished the students and got fired by Kibosh, due to the students' revenge, a new headmaster approached and nobody wants to follow him.
26	26	"Casper the Match Maker"	November 12, 2009
26	26	"Jimmy Bradley: Creature Catcher"	November 12, 2009
When Frankenjymteacher and Heddy fall in love with each other, Casper, Mantha and Ra set up "mystery dates". Jimmy's dad takes Jimmy to tag along with him and make him a Junior Creature Catcher for the day. Meanwhile Casper's assignment is to get items on a list.

=== Season 2 (2012) ===
No. overall	No. in season	Title	Original release date
27	1	"Monster Movie"	October 2, 2012
27	1	"Quacky Duck"	October 2, 2012
In the season premiere, Casper and his friends make a monster movie. Someone brings a rubber duck to Scare School which is forbidden and tries to frame Casper.
28	2	"Dopple Gangers"	October 3, 2012
28	2	"Totally Bats!"	October 3, 2012
The students learn how to copy other living beings' appearances. Casper turns himself into Jimmy. By mistaken identity, Mr. Bradley accidentally takes "Jimmy" to a TV quiz show. Casper and Jimmy are trying to get rid of some bats out of the kitchen cabinet. Casper convinces Thatch to take those bats with him, but it makes matters worse as Thatch and his new bat friends are out on a scaring spree.
29	3	"Cappy's Mail Order Eyes"	October 4, 2012
29	3	"Pumpkinpal"	October 4, 2012
Casper, Mantha, and Ra give Cappy a new pair of eyes for his birthday so that he can actually see, but it turns out to be the wrong pair of eyes and now Cappy is afraid of everything he sees. Pumpkinhead pretends to have a secret friend called Veggie Man and Casper and his friends try to bring him to life.
30	4	"The Day the Professor Croaked"	October 5, 2012
30	4	"The Potent Brew"	October 5, 2012
Professor Burns wants to leave Scare School for a special convention so Casper makes the headmasters believe that the professor has turned into Mosshead's fire-spitting toad Ricardo. Stinkie and Mr. Bradley get trapped in one of Mr. Bradley's ghost traps.
31	5	"The Bellyache Mystery"	October 9, 2012
31	5	"Goodbye Jimmy"	October 9, 2012
The Sea Monster has indigestion and throws up a ballet shoe causing Alder and Dash to think he has eaten Quasi. Casper and his friends have to prove the Monster's innocence before he is banished. Mr. Bradley plans to move to Scotland to catch more monsters.
32	6	"Poltergeist Assignment"	October 10, 2012
32	6	"Little Dragon"	October 10, 2012
Frankengymteacher teaches the kids the basics of telekinesis, using goggles he has issued to them, and assigns a different house to each kid so they can practice with their new powers. Casper finds a dragon egg in the forbidden attic and brings it to Professor Burns' class. The teacher is thrilled about it and fetches the headmaster so that he can also attend the dragon's birth.
33	7	"Haunting Smell"	October 11, 2012
33	7	"The Manor Has Disappeared"	October 11, 2012
Fatso and Stretch can't stand Stinkie's stench so hey decide to suck his odor out of him with a vacuum cleaner. Casper is left in charge of the manor while his uncles go fishing. Jimmy is inside trying to work the dimension tube but has accidentally sent the manor into it and shrunk it to the size of a dolls house.
34	8	"Thatch My Idol"	October 12, 2012
34	8	"Monster Catcher"	October 12, 2012
While nursing his cold, Casper has had enough of seeing Thatch bully his friends so he sprays him with a perfume he found in his uncles' magic ointment box, thinking that it will make Thatch friendly. Casper is guided by a mysterious compass which belonged to his ancestor Jasper the Jester. The compass leads him and his friends to a secret attic in Scare School and soon realize they are actually trapped in a labyrinth with monster catchers.
35	9	"Home Alone"	October 15, 2012
35	9	"I'm Not a Hero"	October 15, 2012
Casper is punished by the headmaster for having helped an old lady carry her shopping bags and is forced to carry all the teachers' bags while they are in a reunion. Meanwhile, Thatch takes the chance to take over the school while the teachers are trapped in the cave. During a scare assignment in Deedstown Casper can't resist rescuing a kitten that was about to fall from a tree to the wrath of Alder and Dash.
36	10	"Dream Team"	October 16, 2012
36	10	"Curse of the Ring"	October 16, 2012
Casper is at Jimmy's house and bumps into Mr. Bradley sleepwalking. It turns out that Mr. Bradley is being haunted by a very naughty Dream Ghost. Casper finds a ring in the Secret Attic and puts it on, but the ring won't come off and even starts to control Casper himself.
37	11	"Cheese"	October 17, 2012
37	11	"Casper's New Friend"	October 17, 2012
Casper asks his uncle Stinkie to fix Mantha's 'Polaroid' camera after he accidentally made her drop it, when she needs it for an assignment. The camera works but now it traps any living being into a picture. When Thatch hears about it, he steals the camera from Ra and goes on a wild spree trapping everybody he can in the photos. Casper accidentally frees "Goo the Giggling Ghoul" from a vial in the science lab and has to show him that being scary is better than being friendly before the teachers get to destroy him.
38	12	"Sweet Dreams"	October 18, 2012
38	12	"Typewriter from Hell"	October 18, 2012
Thatch is tired of Casper winning the Grimly Trophy every year and tries to sabotage him using a portable organ to send everyone to sleep. Stretch lends Casper his typewriter while he tries to fix Casper's laptop. Casper uses a typewriter that writes the opposite of what he says.
39	13	"Mad-Dog McSneer"	October 19, 2012
39	13	"Our Boy Wolfie"	October 19, 2012
Hedy Hopper challenges Casper to invite the legendary Mad-Dog McSneer to Scare School to give a scare domanstration. Jimmy's parents mistake Wolfie for their son, thinking he has turned into a werewolf, and take him in.
40	14	"Ghost Writer"	October 22, 2012
40	14	"Ghost Magnet"	October 22, 2012
Casper and Jimmy's favorite author announced that he is retiring because he doesn't have any ideas for his next story. Casper tries to help him get inspired again, but instead he ends up scaring him and having him accidentally sent to the Underworld. Mr. Bradley invents a magnet that is supposed to attract ghosts but instead it takes away their abilities.
41	15	"Invasion of the Bog Monsters"	October 23, 2012
41	15	"Now You See Me, Now You Don't"	October 23, 2012
Casper makes a whistle which makes a loud noise instead of a silent bat call. He gives it to Prof. Burns for his ear-drum bursting organ but he ends up attracting the bog monsters into scare school and they start turning everyone into bog monsters like themselves. Casper, Mantha and Ra get Frankengymteacher to believe that he can turn invisible to get them out of detention, which leads to him doing things that he would not do if people saw him. Alder and Dash find out that he has been "acting up" and suspended him.
42	16	"Love Potion"	October 24, 2012
42	16	"Stage Fright"	October 24, 2012
Casper accidentally creates a love potion that will turn even the most scariest monster into a lovable creature. Woodward gets cast as a lead in the school play after Cappy mistakes Dummy Girl for him and has her tied up to the mast sailing off with her.
43	17	"Substitute Gargoyle"	October 25, 2012
43	17	"Ship in a Bottle"	October 25, 2012
Casper is made a substitute for one of the gargoyles after he had an accident. The bottle that Casper was using for his model ship of Cappy's ship has a curse: whenever someone puts something the bottle and rubs it, the copy of that thing begins to manipulate the original.
44	18	"Jack Out of the Box"	October 26, 2012
44	18	"Casper Meets Super Choc"	October 26, 2012
Casper finds an old Jack-in-the-Box toy that he uses for the toy swap meet with Jimmy. It turns out that Jack is a wicked toy that can hypnotize other beings into doing his bidding and wants revenge against Alder and Dash for locking him up. An alien kid named Super Choc comes to Scare School so that he can learn about the most terrifying monster in the world. His power is shooting chocolate out of his ears and turn anything into chocolate which he tries to do to everyone.
45	19	"Frankengymteacher's Monster"	October 29, 2012
45	19	"Radio Blodge"	October 29, 2012
Casper's gang helps Frankengymteacher build a double so that he can be in two places at once or else he will have to work for Master Blister at Creepy College. Blodge starts his own radio station and tells everyone's secrets to the dismay of Alder and Dash.
46	20	"Davey Jone's Locker"	October 30, 2012
46	20	"Save Graham"	October 30, 2012
Casper tricks Thatch, for making a fool out of him in gym class, into opening a locker which releases the spirit of Davy Jones who possesses Dummy Girl and runs riot. Thatch's gang manages to capture Mr. Bradley with one of his own Creature Catcher devices and brings him back to Scare School and with his other gadgets using them to take over Scare School.
47	21	"Black Cat"	October 31, 2012
47	21	"Jimmy the Ghost"	October 31, 2012
Casper dares Norman to spend some time at the manor for teasing Jimmy. There Norman accidentally knocks over some boxes that contain bottles of a potion that switches bodies and he ends up switching bodies with a black cat. Jimmy gets turned into a ghost by a projector that Casper brought over and Jimmy discovers how fun and how dangerous being a ghost is.
48	22	"Woodward's Day Out"	November 1, 2012
48	22	"Calc the Cameleon"	November 1, 2012
Casper and Jimmy look for Woodward who has been lost in Deedstown since falling off the ship. Casper gives Calculizard a chameleon's tale to replace the one he lost in the movie theater. Now Calc has the ability to blend in.
49	23	"Fearless Freddie"	November 2, 2012
49	23	"Triclops Mistress of Dark"	November 2, 2012
Casper and his classmates are assigned to scare a boy named Freddie who does not seem to be afraid of anything. Triclops acquires magical rings, which she uses to get her revenge on everyone who has picked on her.
50	24	"The Great Screamboard Disgrace"	November 5, 2012
50	24	"Jimmy's Truck Call"	November 5, 2012
Thatch tries to cheat in the Great Screamboard Race by sabotaging the other contestants with his gang. After Norman's gang wreck Jimmy's case Casper replaces it with a forbidden and dangerous trunk, from his uncle's manor, which sends them to the Forbidden Forest.
51	25	"To Catch a Monster"	November 7, 2012
51	25	"No Bones About"	November 7, 2012
The monster catchers from the labyrinth to the Secret Attic are out of control catching everyone in Scare School. Thatch causes the ship to overturn making one of Mickey's legs fall into Deedstown. After Monaco refuses to lend her leg Mickey goes to Deedstown with Casper, who searches for the missing leg, and Mantha, who tries to teach her to control the detached limb.
52	26	"Last Dance"	November 8, 2012
52	26	"Mummy's Boy"	November 8, 2012
The Monster Mash Ball is coming up but Mantha cannot control the tap dancing shoes she found nor get them off. Ra needs a good report card to show his parents, but does not have one. Thatch arranges a meeting with Masbah the Mischief Maker who wants Ra to do some seriously mischievous deeds in return for a good report.

== Home media ==
=== United States ===
In August 2010, Classic Media and Vivendi Entertainment released Casper's Scare School: 12 Monstrous Episodes on DVD in Region 1. This collection features the first 12 episodes of the series.

Season	Episodes	Release dates
Season	Episodes	Region 1
1	26	Twelve Monstrous Episodes: August 10, 2010; Episodes: 1 ("Fang Decay" / "Scare Day"), 2 ("Disarmed and Dangerous" / "Frankenleftovers"), 3 ("Bully For You" / "The Ra-minator"), 4 ("Weekend at Bunny's" / "Grimly Day"), 5 ("Accidental Hero" / "Rich Kid Ra") and 6 ("Dragon Quest" / "Opposite Day")

A DVD release containing the first twelve episodes of Series 2 was released by Classic Media in August 2013. Although the DVD titles it as "Volume 1", a second volume was never made.

=== Australia ===
In 2010, Universal Pictures Australia released three carry-case DVD releases of the series containing episodes from Series 1 - "Vote for Casper", "Scare Day" and "Scare Scouts".

Series 2 was released by Shock Entertainment, who soon released complete Series 1 and 2 DVD sets in February 2016.

=== United Kingdom ===
Universal Pictures UK released three DVD releases of the series - "Vote for Casper" in October 2010, "Scare Day" in October 2011 and "Scare Scouts" in October 2014. All three releases are the same as the Australian releases. Universal and Classic Media also included an episode each on the "Spooky Collection" and "Spooky Collection 2" compilations.

== See also ==
- List of ghost films
