= Extra (American TV program) =

American television news show

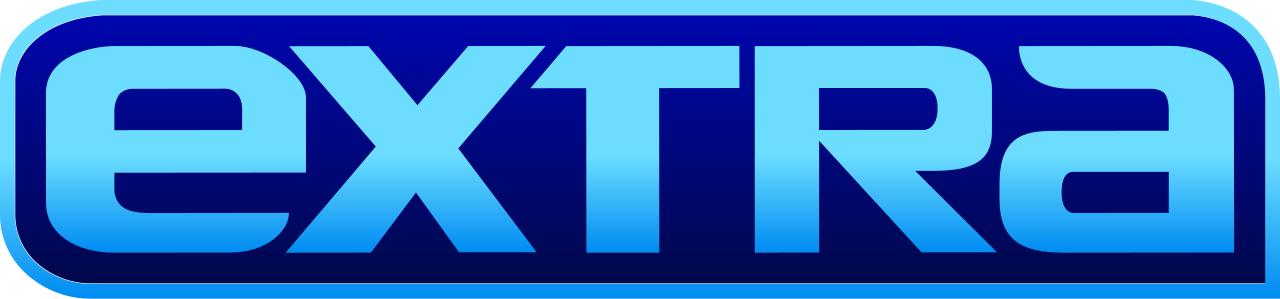
- Also known as: Extra: The Entertainment Magazine (1994–1996)
- Genre: Entertainment news magazine
- Presented by: Mario Lopez; Billy Bush; Derek Hough
- Opening theme: "Extra!...Extra!"
- Country of origin: United States
- Original language: English
- No. of seasons: 32
- No. of episodes: 9,054

Production
- Executive producers: Lisa Gregorisch Dempsey (1996–2022); Jeremy Spiegel (2008–present); Theresa Coffino (2012–2025)
- Production locations: Victory Studios, Glendale, California (1994–2010); The Grove at Farmers Market, Los Angeles (2010–2013); Universal Studios Hollywood, Universal City, California (2013–2019); The Burbank Studios, Burbank, California (2019–present)
- Camera setup: Multi-camera
- Running time: 22 minutes (weekday editions); 44 minutes (weekend edition)
- Production companies: Time-Telepictures Television (1994–2003) (seasons 1–9); Telepictures Productions (2003–present) (season 10–present); Nuell Riley Productions (1994–1996) (seasons 1–2); Lisa G Productions (2013–2022) (seasons 20–28); Warner Bros. Television Distribution

Original release
- Network: Syndication
- Release: September 5, 1994 – present

Extra (originally titled Extra: The Entertainment Magazine from 1994 to 1996) is an American syndicated news broadcasting newsmagazine that is distributed by Warner Bros. Television Distribution and premiered on September 5, 1994. The program serves as a general overview of news throughout the entertainment industry, providing coverage of events and celebrities; however, since 2013, it has also focused on interviews and insider previews of upcoming film and television projects. Since 2025, the program's weekday broadcasts are anchored by Derek Hough, with the weekend editions co-anchored by Mona Kosar Abdi.

== History ==
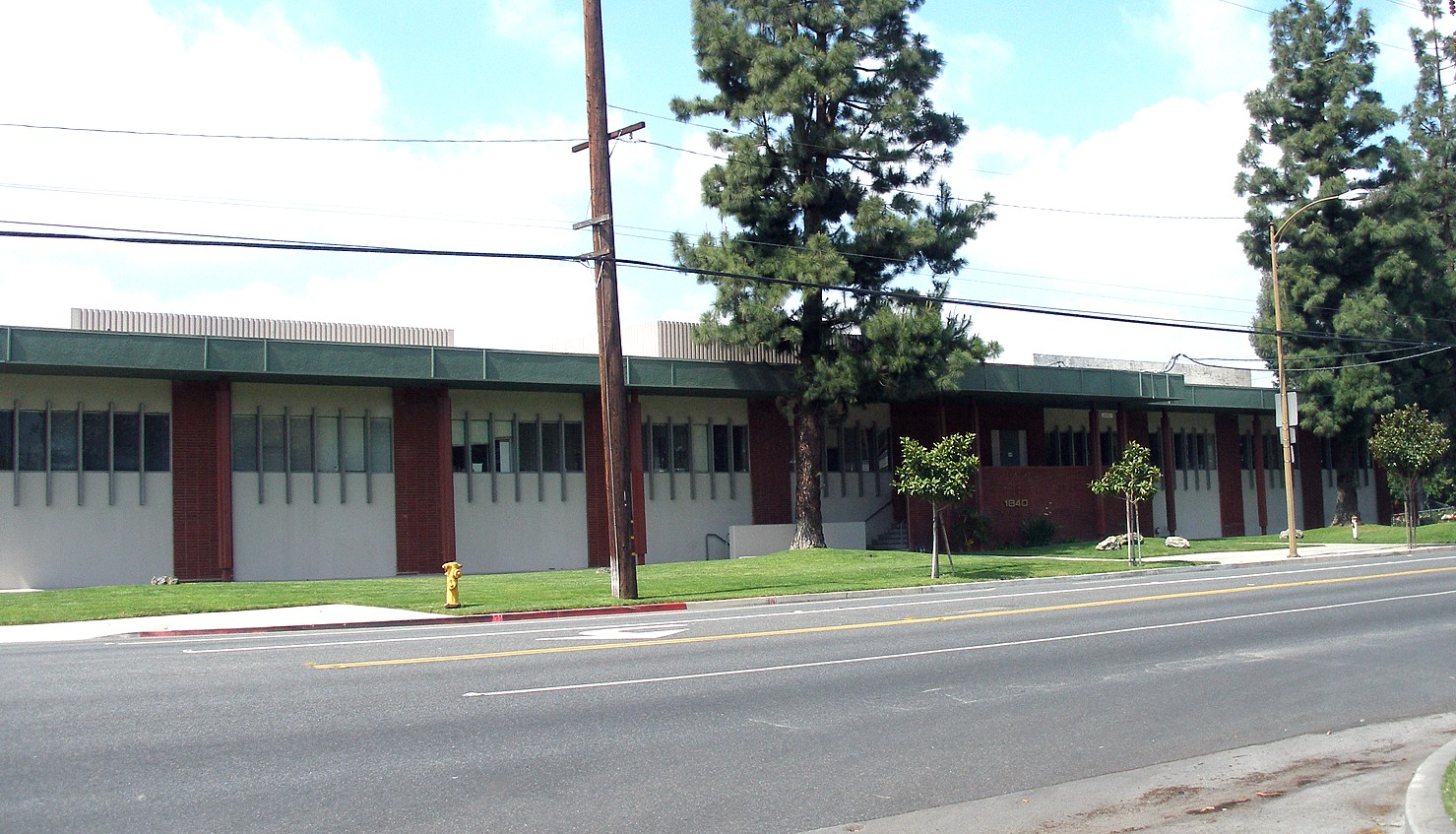
Victory Studios, where Extra was produced from 1994 to 2010, was later home to G4.

The series was developed in the fall of 1993, for a planned launch during the 1994–95 television season. The program was developed under the working title Entertainment News Television; however due to claims that it too closely mirrored its own name, cable channel E! filed a lawsuit against Warner Bros. Television Studios and Telepictures to bar them from using the title; although E! lost the lawsuit in a summary judgment hearing allowing Warner Bros. to continue to use the ENT title for the series, Warner Bros. decided to rename the program to Extra: The Entertainment Magazine in May 1994, four months before the series premiered, with Warner Bros. executives citing that the abbreviated ENT title itself would be too similar to that used by Entertainment Tonight, long shortened officially to simply ET, possibly leading to viewer confusion and confusing Nielsen Media Research ratings diary homes which would have seen their panelists writing down the wrong program they watched.

The program was initially anchored by Dave Nemeth and Arthel Neville. Neville joined the program after being anchor at New Orleans ABC affiliate WVUE-DT (now a Fox affiliate) and a three-year run on Extreme Close-Up, a one-on-one celebrity interview show that she co-produced for E!. Extra was initially distributed by Time-Telepictures Television, a joint venture between Time Inc. and Telepictures, both of which were owned at the time by Time Warner (which would eventually spin off Time Inc. in 2014), that was absorbed by Telepictures in 2003. Nemeth and Neville were both replaced by Brad Goode and Libby Weaver on June 10, 1996, for the remainder of season 2, and season 3 (which premiered on September 9, 1996), before Weaver was replaced by Maureen O'Boyle in July 1997, during season 3. O'Boyle became the main anchor of the program in September 1997, during season 4 premiere; following O'Boyle's departure in September 2000, former Entertainment Tonight anchor/correspondent and talk show host Leeza Gibbons became its main anchor starting in season 7.

In September 2002, Telepictures debuted a spin-off series, Celebrity Justice. The program, which was hosted and executive produced by Harvey Levin, had originated as a segment featured on Extra that focused on legal issues involving celebrities and high-profile court cases with little to no relation to the entertainment industry; Celebrity Justice ran for three seasons before being cancelled in 2005. Levin would subsequently launch the celebrity news website TMZ and two years later, partner with Telepictures and Warner Bros. Television Distribution on a more successful entertainment newsmagazine venture spun off from the site, TMZ on TV.

Following Gibbons's departure in 2004, Extra switched to a two-anchor format for the weekday editions with Sugar Ray lead singer/founder Mark McGrath and correspondent Dayna Devon (who was formerly a news anchor/reporter at ABC affiliates KMID and WATN-TV). In September 2007, the production staff of Extra also began producing CW Now, a weekly lifestyle newsmagazine that aired as part of The CW's Sunday night lineup; that program was cancelled due to low ratings in February 2008, after 18 episodes, continuing to broadcast some CW interstitial segments for several more months after.

On July 28, 2008, Telepictures announced that actor Mario Lopez would join as solo host of the program; Dayna Devon returned to a correspondent role, while Mark McGrath chose to leave the show and return to his music career.

On September 13, 2010, Extra began broadcasting in high definition. the program also abandoned its longtime soundstage at Victory Studios in Glendale, California and moved its taping location to The Grove at Farmers Market, a shopping and entertainment venue in Los Angeles.

On August 4, 2011, Telepictures announced that Maria Menounos (who had previously served as a correspondent for rivals Entertainment Tonight and Access Hollywood) would join Extra as Lopez's co-host, as part of an overall deal with Warner Bros./Telepictures that included a role as a contributor for the CW talk show Drew Pinsky's Lifechangers and development of television program projects. On September 9, 2013, at the beginning of its 20th season, Extra moved its taping location to Universal Studios Hollywood and its Universal CityWalk; at that time, following Menounos's decision to leave Extra to become co-host of E! News, actress/producer Tracey Edmonds and former SportsNation and Fox Sports Live co-host Charissa Thompson were added to replace her as co-hosts. Edmonds later left in June 2017. Thompson left at the end of the program's 23rd season.

On August 7, 2017, Telepictures announced co-host changes in preparation for the program's 24th season: former host/correspondent Tanika Ray would return to Extra as weekday co-host, with correspondents A. J. Calloway and then-weekend edition host Renee Bargh also becoming weekday co-hosts; all joined fellow host Mario Lopez. British television personality Mark Wright also joined as weekday correspondent. Jerry Penacoli served as an off-air correspondent for the series and was rarely seen, voicing most of the show's segments and stories that were not done from CityWalk.

On May 8, 2019, Telepictures announced a retool for the program's 26th season, which premiered on September 9, 2019; former Access Hollywood host Billy Bush joined as co-host, replacing Mario Lopez, who himself moved to rival Access Hollywood. It also moved to The Burbank Studios in Burbank, California where Access had previously filmed. In the months before, Telepictures had signed an agreement with Fox Television Stations to move the series in a number of major top-10 to top-50 markets to syndication on Fox stations, ending a long-term agreement with NBC Owned Television Stations to syndicate the series to NBC's owned and operated stations.

On July 31, 2019, Calloway was terminated from Extra after a number of sexual harassment and assault allegations not involving show staff surfaced (he had previously been suspended earlier in February).

For season 26, the series was planned to be retitled Extra Extra (the show's title theme had long had "Extra!...Extra!" as its main focal point and as a regular segment, supporting the possible change in branding); however the planned renaming was prevented by legal issues from ExtraExtra Show Daily, an entertainment industry expo trade magazine, as it had utilized the title since 1997 as a registered trademark. EESD owner Sandra Driggin notified Telepictures about possible confusion with her publication, a week before the show's premiere, and threatened legal action if the show aired as Extra Extra. Telepictures ultimately decided to retain the Extra name as-is, as the show's staff had not been used to the name change behind the scenes during off-air rehearsals with Bush. On April 11, 2023, it was announced that the series was renewed for a 30th season. On January 22, 2024, it was announced that the series was renewed for a 31st season.

On March 17, 2025, the series was renewed for a 32nd season. Two months after, Bush announced his departure as host at conclusion of the 31st season. In August, Derek Hough was announced as Bush's successor; he began hosting during the 32nd season premiere on September 8, 2025.

== On-air staff ==
=== Current on-air staff ===
==== Anchor ====
- Derek Hough - anchor (2025–present)

==== Correspondents ====
- Mona Kosar Abdi - New York senior correspondent/weekend co-anchor/weekday fill-in anchor (2023–present)
- Renee Bargh – Australian correspondent (2010–present; previously served as Los Angeles correspondent and weekend anchor from 2010 to 2020 and weekday co-anchor from 2017 to 2019)
- Michael Corbett – special, lifestyle, home and real estate correspondent (2000–present)
- Alecia Davis - Nashville correspondent (2022–present)
- Tommy DiDario - special correspondent (2023–present)
- Kaleigh Garris - correspondent
- Adam Glassman — special correspondent (2019–present)
- Carlos Greer - New York correspondent (2022–present)
- Samantha Harris – special correspondent/weekend fill-in anchor (2020–present; previously served as weekend anchor/correspondent 2003 to 2004)
- Freddy Lomeli - correspondent
- Sadie Murray - correspondent
- Terri Seymour – correspondent (2004–present)
- Jenny Taft - correspondent
- Roqui Theus - correspondent
- Mark Wright – correspondent (2017–present)

=== Former on-air staff ===
- Dana Adams – correspondent (1994–1997)
- Hilaria Baldwin – lifestyle correspondent (2012–2019)
- Doug Bruckner – correspondent (1999–2004)
- Michael Bryant – correspondent (2000–2005)
- Nate Burleson — New York correspondent (2019–2021, now co-host of CBS Mornings)
- Billy Bush – anchor (2019–2025)
- A. J. Calloway – New York correspondent (2006–2019)
- Jamie Colby – correspondent (1999; now at Fox News)
- Adrianna Costa – correspondent (2010–2013)
- Olivia Culpo – correspondent (2013)
- Idalis DeLeón – correspondent (2003)
- Dayna Devon – anchor/correspondent (1999–2009; now at KTLA in Los Angeles)
- Carlos Diaz – correspondent (2005–2010; later at HLN and WTHR in Indianapolis)
- Tracey Edmonds – co-host (2014–2017)
- Leeza Gibbons – anchor/correspondent (2000–2003, later co-host of America Now)
- Brad Goode - anchor/correspondent (1996–1997)
- Bo Griffin – correspondent (2001; deceased)
- David Jackson – correspondent (1995–1999)
- Ben Patrick Johnson – senior correspondent (1994–1995)
- Jon Kelley – weekend anchor/correspondent (2000–2006, later at WFLD in Chicago; now host of Funny You Should Ask)
- Sean Kenniff – medical correspondent (2000–2001, later at WFOR-TV in Miami)
- Kurt Knutsson – correspondent (2000)
- Jana Kramer — Nashville correspondent (2019–2021)
- Katie Krause - correspondent (2021–2022)
- Cheslie Kryst – New York correspondent (2019–2022, deceased)
- Jennifer Lahmers — weekend anchor/correspondent (2019–2023; now at KTTV in Los Angeles)
- Rachel Lindsay — correspondent (2020–2023)
- Elaine Lipworth – correspondent (1994–1999)
- Mario Lopez – weekday/weekend anchor (2008–2019; later co-host of Access Hollywood)
- Ben Lyons – correspondent (2012; now at ESPN)
- Holly Madison – Las Vegas insider (2011)
- Charlie Maher – correspondent (2003–2004)
- Jeannie Mai – weekend anchor/correspondent (2009–2010; later co-host of The Real)
- Mark McGrath – anchor/correspondent (2004–2008; later host of Don't Forget the Lyrics!)
- Maria Menounos – weekday co-anchor (2011–2014; later at E! News)
- Terry Murphy – correspondent (2003–2004)
- Dave Nemeth – weekday anchor/correspondent (1994–1996; now at KSTU in Utah)
- Arthel Neville – weekday anchor/correspondent (1994–1996; now at Fox News)
- Barry Nolan – correspondent (2000–2004)
- Maureen O'Boyle – anchor/correspondent (1995–1996, 1997–2000; later at WBTV in Charlotte)
- Christina Olivares – correspondent (2004)
- Jerry Penacoli – correspondent/announcer (2000–2019)
- Scott Rapoport – correspondent (1998–2000)
- Tanika Ray – weekend anchor/correspondent (2004–2009 and weekday co-anchor 2017–2019)
- Melvin Robert - senior correspondent/weekend co-anchor (2022–2025, now at KTLA in Los Angeles)
- Megan Ryte - correspondent (2023–2024)
- Lauren Sánchez – weekend anchor/correspondent (1997–2000, 2009–2010)
- Rick Schwartz – correspondent (1996–2000)
- Phil Shuman – correspondent (1996–2003; now at KTTV in Los Angeles)
- Gina Silva – correspondent (1997–2000; now at KTTV in Los Angeles)
- Tava Smiley – correspondent (2003–2004)
- Larry Stern – correspondent (2003–2004)
- Charissa Thompson – co-host (2014–2017 and Las Vegas correspondent 2019–2025)
- Les Trent – correspondent (1998–2000; later at Inside Edition)
- Alison Waite – Las Vegas insider (2010)
- Libby Weaver – anchor/correspondent (1996–1997; now at KDVR in Denver)

== Production ==
Extra employs a staff of about 150 people, consisting of hosts and correspondents presenting story packages, and editors, producers, library staff and film crews who produce and compile the program. From 2013 until 2019, the program was taped at Universal Studios Hollywood each Monday through Friday from 10:00 a.m. to 4:00 p.m. Pacific Time Zone, and taped before a live audience, allowing fans to interact with the show's hosts and see live appearances from actors, musicians, athletes and newsmakers interviewed at the theme park for the program. Extra also used a live audience on coast-to-coast trips each edition, from Hollywood to Planet Hollywood in Las Vegas to its studio at the H&M Times Square store in New York City. The program won its first Daytime Emmy Award in 2014, tying with Entertainment Tonight for Outstanding Entertainment News Program.

On July 8, 2025, executive producer Theresa Coffino announced that she was leaving Extra after 26 years with the program.

== International carriage ==
Only the weekday editions of the program are broadcast outside the United States; the 44-minute weekend edition is only distributed domestically.

- In Canada, the weekday editions of the program airs on a day-behind basis on Citytv at 1 a.m., with a rebroadcast at 2:30 a.m.
- In Australia, the weekday editions of Extra began airing on the Nine Network (who also runs a television datacast channel and news program of the same name) on July 2, 2012, until its 26th season, replacing Entertainment Tonight after Nine declined to renew its contract.
