= Penny Daniels =

American writer and reporter

- Born: Elizabeth Penny Comm
- Education: University of Michigan
- Occupations: Communications consultant and trainer, television news anchor
- Children: 2

Penny Daniels is an American speechwriter, author, communications coach, and a former television news anchor who once interviewed notorious killer Charles Manson and hosted the TV show A Current Affair.

== Early life and education ==
Born as Elizabeth Penny Comm, Daniels is a native of Highland Park, Illinois. She earned a Bachelor's degree from the University of Michigan in 1977 and a Master's degree in Broadcast Journalism from Northwestern University in 1980.

== Professional career ==
Daniels began her career in 1980 at the CBS affiliate in Green Bay Wisconsin, then moved to Buffalo, New York to report and anchor newscasts at WKBW-TV, the ABC affiliate. From there she moved to Washington, D.C., where she was a reporter and anchor at WJLA-TV, the ABC station from 1985 to 1988. In the late 1980s and early 1990s, Daniels was an anchor at WSVN-TV in Miami, where she was the first woman to solo anchor a nationally syndicated, tabloid-style magazine program Inside Story which syndicated as "Inside Report." The program only ran from 1989 to 1990, but, according to local ratings, was hugely popular in Miami where it beat the famous A Current Affair, then-anchored by Maury Povich and at the time aired on competing station WCIX-TV (now WFOR-TV). Shortly before leaving WSVN, Daniels was caught on the air telling a producer "You suck!" "I'm sorry I said it," Daniels later said, according to a report in the Chicago Sun-Times on March 22, 1993. "I don't usually lose my temper when I'm doing a newscast."

In April 1993, Daniels joined WBBM-TV in Chicago, Illinois as an anchor and reporter. In mid-1993, Daniels and Joan Lovett began anchoring the station's new noon newscast.

In September 1994, Daniels left WBBM to join A Current Affair as a New York-based weekday host. She hosted the show until September 1995, when she shifted to being a correspondent for the program's weekday editions and the anchor of the show's weekend edition. The show went off the air in 1996.

In 1998, Daniels joined KHQ-TV in Spokane, Washington. In October 2000, Daniels left the TV news business to work as a communications consultant and trainer in Washington, D.C.

In 2003, Daniels and two partners created the communications consulting and coaching firm, 3D Communications, with offices located across the country. Daniels also interviewed infamous criminal Charles Manson in 1989.

== Personal life ==
Daniels has two grown daughters, both of whom live in New York City. She lives in Chicago. She currently owns the firm Penny Daniels Communications, LLC.
