= Casper's Scare School =

2006 television film directed by Mark Gravas

- DVD cover
- Based on: Casper the Friendly Ghost by Seymour Reit; Joe Oriolo
- Screenplay by: Andrew Nicholls; Darrell Vickers
- Story by: Kirk DeMicco; Bob Mittenthal
- Directed by: Mark Gravas
- Starring: List of Casper's Scare School characters
- Music by: Magnus Fiennes
- Countries of origin: United States; Australia; India
- Original language: English

Production
- Producers: Evan Baily; Ralph Guggenheim; Sandra Walters
- Editor: Daryl Davies
- Running time: 75 minutes
- Production companies: Kapow Pictures; Alligator Planet; Classic Media

Original release
- Network: Cartoon Network
- Release: October 20, 2006

Casper's Scare School (also known as Casper's Scare School: The Movie) is a 2006 animated television film based on the Harvey Comics cartoon character Casper the Friendly Ghost. The film premiered on Cartoon Network on October 20, 2006. It was produced by Classic Media. A TV series of the same name was produced in 2009, as well as a 2008 video game of the same name.

== Plot ==
As a result of Casper being friends with a human boy named Jimmy Bradley (and for failing to scare enough humans), Kibosh, the King of the Underworld, threatens to banish Casper into the Valley of Shadows unless he enrolls in Scare School, headed by the two-headed headmaster Alder and Dash. At Scare School he befriends Ra, a mummy with unraveling issues and Mantha, a zombie girl who keeps falling apart, as well as Cappy, a pirate who takes them to the school, and his parrot Beaky.

There, they learn how to scare "fleshies" (humans) just enough to stop them from dominating the creatures of the Underworld. His first three lessons result in Casper being given detention from the teachers. The school bully, a vampire named Thatch, spies on Casper in an attempt to sabotage him.

Casper feels unable to cope with having to be scary so he decides to go to the Valley of the Shadows by himself, believing the Balance would have to go without him. Upon his arrival Casper finds the Valley to be a colorful garden and he meets his great-aunt Spitzy, who the Ghostly Trio claimed were not allowed to talk about, and the other creatures who were banished there for refusing to scare humans.

Meanwhile, Alder and Dash plot to use a petrification potion to turn Kibosh into stone and take over the Underworld and Deedstown. They test the potion on the Ghostly Trio, who arrive to meet the headmaster(s) after Casper's disappearance, before inviting Kibosh. When Casper's friends discover this they go to the Valley of the Shadows to warn him. Upon their arrival they discover that they can leave the Valley although the residents believe they cannot and had never even tried to. Casper then goes to Deedstown with his friends to stop Alder and Dash in their plot.

The headmasters are convinced to stop by their "ancle" (aunt and uncle in one) Belle and Murray, from the Valley of the Shadows, and when everyone is returned to their original forms Kibosh allows the creatures to be friends with "fleshies" every once in a while. Kibosh confides in Casper that he once had two human friends and shows him a photograph. He tells him that being scary and growing up is hard, but he has confidence in Casper. Meanwhile, Cappy and Beaky soar over the soccer field while Thatch swabs the deck as punishment for his actions.

== Cast ==
- Devon Werkheiser - Casper, Casper's Shadow
- Brett DelBuono - Jimmy Bradley
- Kendre Berry - Ra
- Christy Carlson Romano - Mantha
- Jim Belushi - Alder
- Bob Saget - Dash
- Matthew Underwood - Thatch
- Kevin Michael Richardson - Kibosh
- Dan Castellaneta - Stretch
- Billy West - Fatso, Figurehead
- John DiMaggio - Stinkie, Frankengymteacher
- Debi Derryberry - Banana Lady, History Teacher, Additional Voices
- Scott Menville - Punk Kid, Scare Center Host 2, Pumpkinhead, Braniac, Poolguy, Hunchback, Additional Voices
- Pat Fraley - Scare Center Host 1, Wolfie, Narrator, Werewolf, Additional Voices
- Jason Harris - Gargoyle, Flyboy, Skinny Goast, Coach, Additional Voices
- Candi Milo - Mickey
- Nika Futterman - Monaco
- Maurice LaMarche - Cappy, Thurdigree Burns
- Kevin McDonald - Beaky
- John Kassir - P.A Voice, Additional Voices
- Danny Cooksey - Additional Voices
- Fred Tatasciore - Additional Voices
- E. G. Daily - Additional Voices
- Phyllis Diller - Aunt Spitzy
- Captain & Tennille - Murray and Belle, Alder and Dash's "Ancle"

== Comic book ==
Ape Entertainment published a Casper's Scare School comic book that ran for two issues from October 2011 to June 2012.

== See also ==
- List of ghost films
