= Ghostly Trio =

Fictional characters appearing in Harvey Comics

The Ghostly Trio
- Casper the Friendly Ghost family
- Cover of Casper and the Ghostly Trio #7; from left to right: Lazo, Fusso, Fatso
- First appearance: "Fright from Wrong"; November 2, 1956
- Created by: Joe Oriolo; Seymour Reit
Family members
- Fatso; Fusso; Lazo; Stretch; Stinkie

The Ghostly Trio (consisting of Stretch, Fatso, and Stinkie, formerly Fatso, Fusso, and Lazo) are fictional characters appearing in Harvey Comics. They are the uncles of Casper the Friendly Ghost. Their first animated appearance was in Fright from Wrong, a cartoon of Paramount Pictures' Famous Studios theatrical series from the 1950s. When Casper was transferred to Harvey Comics, the characters were redesigned to make them more mischievous than terror-inspiring. The characters made numerous Harvey Comics appearances and were featured in the title Casper and the Ghostly Trio. Versions of the Ghostly Trio remained prominent in subsequent adaptations/spin-offs.

== Description ==
Originally, Casper was frequently provoked by unrelated generic ghosts for his friendly nature. They were gradually reworked into the Ghostly Trio in order to maintain consistency. Similar to his later incarnation, Fatso was overweight and gluttonous (although, as ghosts were capable of eating in the early stories, this trait was not as odd as it later seemed). He was the Trio's leader, as the toughest and (marginally) smartest of the three. Fatso's "second-in-command", Fusso, was portrayed as average in height and build and was characterized by exceptional fussiness and attention-to-detail. The third ghost, Lazo, was the tallest, laziest and least intelligent. Fatso's brashness and quick temper often led him into mishaps, as well as an occasional role in one of Casper's adventures; Fusso and Lazo were sometimes called "the Ghostly Duo" in his absence. The names do not seem set in stone; in "The Missing Haunts", their names are Eeko, Stretcho, and Fatso.

=== Film versions ===
Since the 1995 Casper feature film, the Ghostly Trio's names have mostly remained Stretch, Fatso and Stinkie. In most appearances, they enjoy scaring people (in contrast with Casper). The group generally treat Casper as their own personal slave and mistreat him. Despite this, the Trio do care about Casper and like him more than they are willing to admit. On rare occasions, they protect him, sometimes out of self-interest. In the 2006 TV-film, Casper's Scare School, the Ghostly Trio are depicted as nice towards Casper and the brothers display concern for him. For example, when Casper leaves for Scare School, the Trio cry.

Most of the time, the Ghostly Trio express a general feeling of superiority towards the living, sometimes degenerating into hatred. In the films from 1995 onwards, they sometime refer to humans as "fleshies" or "bonebags". The 1995 film and spin-off cartoon series, however, show their friendship with Dr. James Harvey. At first, they demand he vacate their home and make his quest to learn about the afterlife difficult. They grow to like him and, certain that his obsession with finding his wife will make him become a ghost, consider expanding their group into a Ghostly Quartet. That would require killing him, but they ultimately prove unable to do it themselves (Harvey later dies in a manhole accident, but this proves temporary). After he stops trying to get them to cross over, they also keep their promise to briefly reunite him with the spirit of his wife. The spin-off cartoon (in which they appeared as the main antagonists) depicted them in a similar light, where they often harass the doctor, although out of mischief rather than hatred.

==== Stretch ====
Stretch is the lanky leader of the Trio with a thick Boston accent. Stretch is the most aggressive at scaring the living by morphing his body, but he is said to be highly experienced at possession. Although he acts the harshest, he has a soft spot, and is perhaps the most sensible in making important decisions. In a deleted song he claims to be schizoid-paranoid, and despite his intelligence, he can be very childish at times.

==== Fatso ====
Fatso is obese and assumed to be the least intelligent, even though he is adept at singing and has a surprisingly strong knowledge of pop culture. He also has a huge appetite for food, regardless of the fact that it literally drifts through his body, constantly overeating and seems to be the most emotional. He treats Casper the same as Stretch and Stinkie, but can easily be manipulated. When Stretch and Stinkie ask about something relevant to a story, a running gag has Fatso asking about something unrelated.

==== Stinkie ====
Stinkie is the "middle child" and dubbed the "Larry Fine" of the group. Stinkie's special talent involves supernatural halitosis and body odor, which he prefers as his means of frightening "fleshies" who cross his path (sometimes announcing this by saying "Smell-o-gram!"). He has a penchant for puns and comedy and comes off as the sarcastic jokester, which Stretch tires of more often than not. Casper's Haunted Christmas shows his interest in modern technology. In the 1995 film, he is portrayed as quieter and more timid than Stretch or Fatso, as reflected by his friendlier face on the film's poster.

===== Ghostbusters comparison =====
Fatso's appearance, voice, and love for food makes him comparable to Slimer, an apparition from Ghostbusters. In 1987 Harvey Comics sued Columbia Pictures (the film's distributor) for $50 million, claiming that the iconic Ghostbusters logo was too reminiscent of Fatso. The court ruled in Columbia's favor, due to Harvey's failure to renew the copyrights on early Casper stories and the "limited ways to draw a figure of a cartoon ghost".

=== Relationship to Casper ===
Casper's exact relationship to the Ghostly Trio varies. In the early comic stories, Casper never addressed any of them as "Uncle", suggesting that they were instead his elder brothers or cousins.

Casper's Haunted Christmas hints at a relationship. The Ghostly Trio refer to Spooky (Casper's cousin) as their nephew. Whether or not that makes them blood relatives, remains unrevealed.

In the 1995 film and spin-off cartoon, they are said to be his uncles.

In the film Casper Meets Wendy, Casper tells Wendy that the Trio are his uncles, but the previous film Casper: A Spirited Beginning claims that Casper is not related to the Ghostly Trio, meeting them for the first time when he runs away from a ghost school run by the evil ghost Kibosh. Attempting to prove their superior ghost techniques, the Trio train Casper in his ghost abilities; when contacted by Kibosh and his assistant, Snivel, they lie to Kibosh about being his uncles so that he can remain in their care. Casper had saved the Trio from Kibosh's wrath after having impressed him when Casper ingested a bomb that saved the Trio's home from being destroyed. The Trio returned the favor by more or less adopting Casper so he would not have to go to scare school under Kibosh's orders, therefore remaining a family as Kibosh said that family stays and haunts together.

== Powers and abilities ==
The Ghostly Trio are an experienced group of ghosts that have vast supernatural powers. Some powers include intangibility, invisibility, teleportation, flight, possession (they supposedly hold the records for the longest lasting possessions), matter transmutation, shapeshifting and other forms of reality warping seen in canon.

== Actors ==
Joe Nipote voiced Stretch, Joe Alaskey voiced Stinkie, and Brad Garrett voiced Fatso in the 1995 film Casper and its television series The Spooktacular New Adventures of Casper, with Garrett being switched out with Jess Harnell in seasons 3 and 4.

Jim Ward voiced Stretch, Bill Farmer voiced Stinkie and Jess Harnell voiced Fatso in Casper: A Spirited Beginning and Casper Meets Wendy.

Scott McNeil voiced Stretch, Terry Klassen voiced Stinkie and Graeme Kingston voiced Fatso in Casper's Haunted Christmas.

Dan Castellaneta voiced Stretch, John DiMaggio voiced Stinkie and Billy West voiced Fatso in the 2006 TV-film, Casper's Scare School, but for the television show, Fatso is voiced by Joe Sheridan and Stinkie and Stretch are voiced by Matthew Géczy.

In Casper Meets Wendy, the Ghostly Trio possess three human men (for hours) at a dance party and end up flirting with the three witches, Wendy's aunts. Michael McDonald played Spike (Human Stretch), Travis McKenna played Phil (Human Fatso) and Patrick Richwood played Vince (Human Stinkie).

Fred Armisen voiced Stretch, Eric Bauza voiced Stinkie and Stephen Root voiced Fatso in the series finale of the Netflix series Harvey Girls Forever!.

Character	Casper 1995	Spooktacular New Adventures 1996–98	A Spirited Beginning 1997	Casper Meets Wendy 1998	Haunted Christmas 2000	Casper's Scare School 2006	Casper's Scare School 2009–12	Harvey Girls Forever! 2018–20
Fatso	Brad Garrett	Brad Garrett (Season 1–2) Jess Harnell (Season 3–4)	Jess Harnell	Jess Harnell	Graeme Kingston	Billy West	Joe Sheridan	Stephen Root
Stinkie	Joe Alaskey	Joe Alaskey	Bill Farmer	Bill Farmer	Terry Klassen	John DiMaggio	Matthew Géczy	Eric Bauza
Stretch	Joe Nipote	Joe Nipote	Jim Ward	Jim Ward	Scott McNeil	Dan Castellaneta	Matthew Géczy	Fred Armisen

== See also ==
- List of ghosts
