= Casper the Friendly Ghost in film =

Feature length filmography based on Casper the Friendly Ghost

The CGI version of Casper that appears in the live-action films.

The cartoon character, Casper the Friendly Ghost who appears in numerous cartoon shorts as well as Harvey Comics publication, has appeared in five films since his inception, most of which were either released in television or straight-to-video while only one was released theatrically. Many for the most part are unrelated to each other. Like in the comics and animated shorts, the films feature Casper, a ghost of a deceased child, who refused to frighten others and would like nothing more than to be friendly around the world, due to the nature of what he appears to be, it would often get him shunned by whoever he encounters, but along the way, he would find and befriend a certain someone he could identify himself with, and would often help that someone in need.

Created by Seymour Reit and Joe Oriolo, the character made his debut in three theatrical animated shorts in the mid to late 1940s from Noveltoons, and were released by Paramount Pictures and produced by Paramount Pictures' Famous Studios, then started a series of theatrical shorts from 1950 to 1959, right before Harvey Comics ended up buying the rights to the character.

After having numerous Casper cartoons released on home video by Universal Studios, a deal was made for a live-action feature produced by Amblin Entertainment with executive producer Steven Spielberg hiring Brad Silberling in his directional debut to direct Casper (1995). The film became a commercial success but was met with mixed reviews from critics. In the late 1990s, The Harvey Entertainment Company and Saban Entertainment brought the Casper film rights and produced two direct-to-video films released by 20th Century Fox Home Entertainment with Casper: A Spirited Beginning (1997) and its sequel, Casper Meets Wendy (1998). Both films are highly regarded as prequels to 1995 film, despite not having the same storyline from the latter. The films were also critically panned by critics, which led Universal Studios to cancel further plans for a sequel to the theatrical film.

In the early 2000s, Harvey Entertainment returned once more along with Mainframe Entertainment (replacing Saban Entertainment) with a film released by Universal Pictures Home Entertainment entitled Casper's Haunted Christmas (2000). Unlike the previous three films, this was completely done in computer animation. This was also the last Casper film to be involved with Universal. In the mid-2000s, was the second computer-animated film made for television produced by Moonscoop and released by Classic Media titled Casper's Scare School (2006). The film eventually had its own spin-off series with the same title airing on Cartoon Network, released in 2009.

== Films ==
Crew/detail	Films				
Crew/detail	Casper (1995)	Casper: A Spirited Beginning (1997)	Casper Meets Wendy (1998)	Casper's Haunted Christmas (2000)	Casper's Scare School (2006)
Director(s)	Brad Silberling	Sean McNamara	Sean McNamara	Owen Hurley	Mark Gravas; Ben Choo
Writer(s)	Sherri Stoner; Deanna Oliver	Karey Kirkpatrick; Jymn Magon; Thomas Hart; Thomas McCluskey (story); Rob Kerchner (story)	Jymn Magon	Ian Boothby; Roger Fredericks	Andrew Nicholls; Darrell Vickers
Producer(s)	Colin Wilson	Mike Elliott	Mike Elliott	Byron Vaughns	Evan Baily; Ralph Guggenheim; Sandra Walters
Editor(s)	Michael Kahn	John Walts; John Gilbert	John Gilbert	Andrew Duncan	Daryl Davies
Cinematographer	Dean Cundey	Christian Sebaldt	Christian Sebaldt	—N/a	—N/a
Composer(s)	James Horner	Udi Harpaz	Udi Harpaz	Robert Buckley	Magnus Fiennes
Production company(s)	Amblin Entertainment; The Harvey Entertainment Company	The Harvey Entertainment Company; Saban Entertainment	The Harvey Entertainment Company; Saban Entertainment	Mainframe Entertainment; The Harvey Entertainment Company	Classic Media; Kapow Pictures; Alligator Planet
Distributor(s)	Universal Pictures	20th Century Fox Home Entertainment		Universal Studios Home Video; The Harvey Entertainment Company	Genius Products
Running time	101 minutes	90 minutes	94 minutes	86 minutes	75 minutes
Release date	May 26, 1995	September 9, 1997	September 22, 1998	October 31, 2000	October 20, 2006

== Theatrical film ==
=== Casper (1995) ===
With Steven Spielberg as executive producer of the film, he hired Brad Silberling to direct, making it Brad's first feature film as a director. The film stars Christina Ricci, Bill Pullman, Cathy Moriarty and Eric Idle, with voice talents of Joe Nipote, Joe Alaskey, Brad Garrett and Malachi Pearson in the title role. This film was set in Friendship, Maine and makes extensive use of computer-generated imagery to make the ghosts such as Casper and his uncles the Ghostly Trio come to life and have them interacted with the live actors. This was also the first film to feature a CGI character in a lead role. The film gave Casper a back-story and is the only time that explains his death. In the film, Casper was a twelve-year-old boy living in Whipstaff Manor with his inventor father J.T. McFadden until he died from pneumonia after playing out in the cold until it was past nightfall. This was also the only film to have Casper on screen in his human form. The film received mixed reviews and became a commercial success.

=== Cancelled sequel ===
Following the release of Casper, Simon Wells co-wrote a screenplay for Casper 2, in which he was set to direct. In July 2000, Universal Pictures cancelled the sequel due to the disappointing sales from the direct-to-video Casper films and the hesitation of Christina Ricci.

== Saban Entertainment direct-to-video films (1997–1998) ==
2 movie-set of films from Saban Entertainment and 20th Century Fox Home Entertainment.

=== Casper: A Spirited Beginning (1997) ===
In 1997, Harvey Entertainment Company and Saban Entertainment produced the direct-to-video film released by 20th Century Fox Home Entertainment. The film was directed as a prequel to the 1995 film explaining how Casper became a ghost, but completely ignoring the storyline of 1995 film, with Casper dying on the present day, no mention of Whipstaff Manor or his father J.T. McFadden and the Ghostly Trio not being directly related to him. While it being a direct-to-video film, the film has a list of an all-star cast, such as Steve Guttenberg, Lori Loughlin, Rodney Dangerfield, Michael McKean, James Earl Jones, and Pauly Shore. The film was panned by critics.

=== Casper Meets Wendy (1998) ===
After the release of Casper: A Spirited Beginning, in 1998, Saban Entertainment returned once more with its sequel while being the second prequel to the 1995 feature film Casper. The film's director Sean McNamara, who also directed Casper: A Spirited Beginning, reintroduced a character who was in the Casper comics and cartoon known as Wendy the Good Little Witch. The role of Wendy was given to Hilary Duff in her first feature when she was 11 years old. The film also marks the second Casper film to co-star Cathy Moriarty, who played the villainess in the 1995 film. The film received mostly negative reviews from critics, but is considered to be a slight improvement over Casper: A Spirited Beginning. The film also won the Children's Programming – Electronic Visual Effects award with Hilary Duff being nominated for a Young Artist Award.

== Animated films ==
=== Casper's Haunted Christmas (2000) ===
In 2000, Harvey Entertainment Company returned once with Mainframe Entertainment to produce a direct-to-video film released by Universal Pictures Home Entertainment. The film was all done in computer animation, as opposed to its live-action predecessors. The film was set in Christmas time with Casper and his uncles, the Ghostly Trio being forced by Kibosh to have Casper purposely scare someone on Christmas Eve or else he and his uncles will be sentenced to the dark for all eternity. The film also features Casper's cousin's Spooky the Tuff Little Ghost and Spooky's girlfriend Poil. Brendan Ryan Barrett who portrayed Casper's best friend, Chris Carson from Casper: A Spirited Beginning got to voice the titular character himself in the film.

=== Casper's Scare School (2006) ===
In 2006, Classic Media produced a made-for-television film based on the character. The film features Casper being sentenced to a school that will teach him how to scare others. In 2009, the film spawned a spin-off animated series with the same title.

=== Cancelled theatrical CGI reboot ===
In 2013, DreamWorks Animation announced that they were rebooting Casper as a computer-animated reboot film, with Simon Wells, who at one point was previously attached to write and direct the unproduced sequel to the live-action film, to write and direct, with writing duo John Altschuler and Dave Krinsky (King of the Hill, Blades of Glory) to co-write the film's script. It was set to be DreamWorks' second attempt at an animated film based on characters from the Classic Media library, but nothing came of it since its announcement, likely due to the financial failure of Mr. Peabody & Sherman (2014). Concept art for an unproduced film was posted on ArtStation by animator Danny Williams in December 2023, stating that the pitch "never went anywhere".

== Future ==
In 2012, DreamWorks Animation acquired the rights to the character from Classic Media as well as all the other Harvey Comics characters. No plans for future Casper films have been announced.

== Cast and characters ==
Character	Theatrical film	Saban Entertainment direct-to-video films		Animated direct-to-video film	Television film
Character	Casper	Casper: A Spirited Beginning	Casper Meets Wendy	Casper's Haunted Christmas	Casper's Scare School
Ghosts
Casper The Friendly Ghost	Malachi Pearson Devon Sawa (Note: Portrays Casper's human form.)	Jeremy Foley	Jeremy Foley	Brendan Ryan Barrett	Devon Werkheiser
Stretch Stinkie Fatso The Ghostly Trio	Joe Nipote	Jim Ward	Jim Ward	Scott McNeil	Dan Castellaneta
Stretch Stinkie Fatso The Ghostly Trio	Joe Alaskey	Bill Farmer	Bill Farmer	Terry Klassen	John DiMaggio
Stretch Stinkie Fatso The Ghostly Trio	Brad Garrett	Jess Harnell	Jess Harnell	Graeme Kingston	Billy West
Kibosh		James Earl Jones		Colin Murdock	Kevin Michael Richardson
Snivel		Pauly Shore		Lee Tockar	
Spooky The Tuff Little Ghost				Samuel Vincent	
Poil				Tabitha St. Germain	
Aunt Spitzy					Phyllis Diller
Other mystical beings
Amelia Harvey	Amy Brenneman				
Wendy The Good Little Witch			Hilary Duff		
Gert Gabby Fanny The Witch Sisters			Cathy Moriarty		
Gert Gabby Fanny The Witch Sisters			Shelley Duvall		
Gert Gabby Fanny The Witch Sisters			Teri Garr		
Desmond Spellman			George Hamilton		
Jules & Vincent			Richard Moll		
Jules & Vincent			Vincent Schiavelli		
The Oracle			Pauly Shore		
Ra					Kendré Berry
Mantha					Christy Carlson Romano
Thatch					Matthew Underwood
Alder & Dash					Jim Belushi
Alder & Dash					Bob Saget
Cappy					Maurice LaMarche
Beaky					Kevin McDonald
Wolfie					Pat Fraley
Bell and Murray "The Ancle"					Captain & Tennille
Humans
Kathleen "Kat" Harvey	Christina Ricci				
Dr. James Harvey	Bill Pullman				
Carrigan Crittenden	Cathy Moriarty				
Paul "Dibs" Plutzker	Eric Idle				
Vic Dephillippi	Garette Ratliff Henson				
Amber Whitmire	Jessica Wesson				
Chris Carson		Brendan Ryan Barrett			
Tim Carson		Steve Guttenberg			
Sheila Fistergraff		Lori Loughlin			
Mayor Hunt		Rodney Dangerfield			
Bill Case		Michael McKean			
Jennifer		Shannon Chandler			
Brock Lee		Steven Hartman			
Danny		Logan Robbins			
Leon		D'Juan Watts			
Josh Jackman			Blake Foster		
Logan			Logan Robbins		
Holly Jollimore				Tegan Moss	
Carol Jollimore				Kathleen Barr	
Noel Jollimore				Scott McNeil	
Jimmy Bradly					Brett Delbuono

Ben Stein has made a cameo appearance in all three of the live-action films. In Casper he portrayed a lawyer to the late father of the film's antagonist Carrigan Crittenden presenting the will her father gave her to Whipstaff. In Casper: A Spirited Beginning he portrayed a Grocer whom Casper innocently approached causing him to run in fear. In Casper Meets Wendy he portrayed a guest at the dance party where there was a scene with him talking to the human whom Fatso processed, and another scene where he asked one of the witches in disguise: Gert (another character portrayed by Moriarty) for a dance, but she scold him. While not being credited in the film, rumors have stated that he is a lawyer which could mean that he is the same character from the original film, but it is unclear.

Casper Van Dien has made two cameo appearances in the Saban-produced films. In Casper: A Spirited Beginning he portrayed as one of the bystanders in defending the Applegate Mansion. In Casper Meets Wendy he portrayed as a hunk at the dance party the three witches fall heads over heels for causing him to flee leaving only his leather jacket behind.

The first two films have had other celebrity cameos. In Casper, there was Don Novello reprising his role as Father Guido Sarducci from Saturday Night Live as well as Dan Aykroyd reprising his role as Ghostbuster Raymond "Ray" Stantz. Clint Eastwood, Rodney Dangerfield, Mel Gibson and the Crypt Keeper all appeared in Dr. James Harvey's reflection. Steven Spielberg was also supposed to appear in the reflection, but was cut out. In Casper: A Spirited Beginning, there was Brian Doyle-Murray portraying the head construction worker Foreman Dave who was one of the witnesses petrified of the Ghostly Trio, Debi Mazar (who was uncredited in the film) portraying Tim Carson's secretary assistant Angie, and Sherman Hemsley portraying a store owner who was unintentionally saved by Casper when he was being robbed.

== Reception ==
=== Box office performance ===
Film	Release date	Box office revenue			Box office ranking		Budget	Reference
Film	Release date	Domestic	Foreign	Worldwide	All time domestic	All time worldwide	Budget	Reference
Casper	May 26, 1995	$100,328,194	$187,600,000	$287,928,194	#617	#380	$55 million	

=== Critical and public response ===
Film	Rotten Tomatoes	Metacritic	CinemaScore
Casper	60% (70 reviews)	—N/a	A
Casper: A Spirited Beginning	0% (5 reviews)	—N/a	—N/a
Casper Meets Wendy	17% (6 reviews)	—N/a	—N/a
Casper's Haunted Christmas	38% (2 reviews)	—N/a	—N/a
Casper's Scare School	50% (1 reviews)	—N/a	—N/a

== See also ==
- List of ghost films
- Casper the Friendly Ghost filmography
