= Casper and the Angels =

1979 American animated television series

- Genre: Adventure; Mystery; Comedy horror Sci-fi
- Based on: Casper the Friendly Ghost by: Seymour Reit; Joe Oriolo
- Written by: Bob Ogle; Jack Bonestell; Patsy Cameron; Gary Greenfield; Dick Robbins
- Directed by: Oscar Dufau; George Gordon; Ray Patterson; Carl Urbano
- Voices of: Julie McWhirter; Diana McCannon; Laurel Page; John Stephenson; Hal Smith; Paul Winchell
- Composer: Hoyt Curtin
- Country of origin: United States
- Original language: English
- No. of episodes: 13 (26 segments)

Production
- Executive producers: William Hanna; Joseph Barbera
- Producers: Alex Lovy; Art Scott
- Running time: 30 minutes
- Production companies: Hanna-Barbera Productions; Harvey Films

Original release
- Network: NBC
- Release: September 22 – December 15, 1979

Casper and the Angels is an American animated television series based on the Harvey Comics cartoon character Casper the Friendly Ghost, produced by Hanna-Barbera Productions and broadcast on NBC from September 22 to December 15, 1979.

== Plot ==
Casper the Friendly Ghost is a "guardian ghost" to two female Space Police officers named Mini (who is a rather ditzy redhead) and Maxi (who is a much more intelligent African-American woman with a very short temper) who patrol the Jetsons-style Space City on their flying motorcycles in the year 2179.

They are joined by the rambunctious but good-hearted Hairy Scary, a large, shaggy, thousand year old ghost with a red nose and big bow tie who enjoys scaring people, especially villains and other troublemakers, but because he has a great deal of affection for his little pal Casper, he, unlike most of their ghostly kind, tries to accept the fact that the gentle ghost does not like to scare people.

Less accepting, especially toward Mini and Maxi, are their fellow officers Nerdley and Fungo, a pair of bumbling, flying patrol car-driving male chauvinists who are always trying to prove that they are superior to their female counterparts, only to have their efforts undone by their own stupidity and cowardice.

== Production ==
The show was Hanna-Barbera's second attempt to cash in on the popularity of Charlie's Angels as well as the popularity of the motorcycle police drama CHiPs, the first being Captain Caveman and the Teen Angels on ABC.

Twenty-six 15-minute segments shown as thirteen 30-minute episodes were produced, as well as two television specials Casper's Halloween Special and Casper's First Christmas.

The series was shown on Cartoon Network and Boomerang for a few years and rarely found on television since 2003 or even earlier. Some of the episodes can be found on YouTube.

Like many animated series created by Hanna-Barbera in the 1970s, the show contained a laugh track.

== Cast ==
- Julie McWhirter as Casper the Friendly Ghost
- John Stephenson as Hairy Scary the Ghost / Commander
- Diana McCannon as Space Patrol Officer Maxi
- Laurel Page as Space Patrol Officer Mini
- Hal Smith as Nerdley
- Paul Winchell as Fungo

=== Additional voices ===
- Rick Dees
- Bob Hastings
- Jim MacGeorge
- Ronnie Schell
- Frank Welker

== Episodes ==
No.	Title	Original release date
1	"Casper's Golden Chance" "Space Circus"	September 22, 1979
"Casper's Golden Chance": Mini and Maxi try to track down space hijackers who are after a gold bullion, while Hairy Scarey tries to teach Casper to scare.; "Space Circus": Casper and Hairy Scarey go to the Space Circus, where a diamond smuggler gets a pickup. With Mini and Maxi in pursuit, Casper and Hairy catch the smuggler.
2	"Casper Ghosts West" "Casper's Camp-Out"	September 29, 1979
"Casper Ghosts West": Mini and Maxi have an assignment to protect Sandy Gulch from thugs disguised as ghosts. Hairy Scarey takes the liberty of scaring the phony ghosts.; "Casper's Camp-Out": Mini and Maxi are assigned to be directors at the Space Kids Camp, where Casper makes friends with animals. The camp is in danger of being destroyed when a river dam is fractured, but Casper helps save the day.
3	"Strike Four" "The Space Pirate"	October 6, 1979
"Strike Four": Mini, Maxi and Casper go to baseball stadium to keep an eye on Don Button who is the Space City Dodgers champion, but someone is impersonating him.; "The Space Pirate": Mini and Maxi search for Captain Spacebeard, while Casper and Hairy Scarey board his ship. Together they stop Spacebeard before he can execute his plan to rob a bank.
4	"Shipwrecked" "The Cat Burglar"	October 13, 1979
"Shipwrecked": Mini and Maxi drive a new Space Bus, but Hairy Scarey accidentally gets them stranded on a remote planet. After an encounter with the savage inhabitants, they all escape.; "The Cat Burglar": Nerdley and Fungo investigate a cat burglary, but Mini and Maxi take over where they fail. With Hairy Scarey's help they set a trap to catch the cat burglar.
5	"Something Fishy" "The Smiling Lisa"	October 20, 1979
"Something Fishy": The Angels, Casper and Hairy Scarey go to the Space Aquarium, but the seal Snowball gets held for ransom. After rescuing Snowball, Hairy proceeds to pursue the culprits.; "The Smiling Lisa": Mini and Maxi are sent to safeguard the Smiling Lisa, but when Casper and Hairy Scarey come it is stolen. They find out it was stolen by an imposter who is after the insurance money.
6	"A Pocket Full O' Schemes" "A Tale of Two Trashmen"	October 27, 1979
"A Pocket Full O' Schemes": Mini and Maxi search for a pickpocket called the Snatcher who steals things that he doesn't really want. When they do catch him, there is a dispute on who gets the credit.; "A Tale of Two Trashmen": The Angels, Casper and Hairy Scarey investigate a burglary. The refuse collectors salvage the stolen items in their scow. The Angels and ghosts track and catch them.
7	"Fatula" "T.V. or Not T.V."	November 3, 1979
"Fatula": Fatula is a villain who was previously arrested by Maxi and Mini, and now plans his revenge on the policewomen. Fatula lures the Angels into trap, but Casper and Hairy Scarey come to the rescue.; "T.V. or Not T.V.": Mini and Maxi have been awarded to star on television. At the same time Slippery Sam has escaped prison, but before he can make a fool of the Angels, Casper and Hairy Scarey scare him away.
8	"Gone to the Dogs" "Private Eyeball to Eyeball"	November 10, 1979
"Gone to the Dogs": Casper gets a dog called Sunspot. The dog however is not his to keep and a dog catcher is stealing owners' dogs. Hairy Scarey goes as a dog catch the dog catcher.; "Private Eyeball to Eyeball": Hairy Scarey volunteers to be a private eye. The crooked detective Snoopy is after the gold bullion Mini and Maxi are guarding. Casper saves the Angels and gets Snoopy under arrest.
9	"Champ for a Day" "The Ghost Robbers"	November 17, 1979
"Champ for a Day": When "The Champ", a famous wrestler, has his cherished teddy bear stolen, he refuses to get into the ring and looks like to be sabotage. While the Angels track down the one responsible, it's up to Hairy to take the Champ's place.; "The Ghost Robbers": When the United Space Bank is robbed by a couple of ghosts, everyone thinks that Casper and Hairy are the culprits. It is up to them to clear their names.
10	"Aunt Mary Scary" "The Ice Heist"	November 24, 1979
"Aunt Mary Scary": Hairy tries to impersonate the Police Commander in an attempt to impress his aunt Mary.; "The Ice Heist": The ghosts help the angels uncover jewel thieves at the space towers hotel.
11	"A Shoplifting Experience" "The Impossible Scream"	December 1, 1979
"A Shoplifting Experience": Casper, Hairy Scarey, and The Angels pursue a shoplifter who uses electronic devices to steal.; "The Impossible Scream": Notorious (and nearsighted) ruffian and master troublemaker Muscles McSnort is out causing trouble in Space City with his antics and its up to Officers Mini and Maxi to collar him, but they'll have to do it without the help of Hairy Scarey, who upon failing to frighten McSnort has lost faith in himself.
12	"Prehistoric Hi-Jinx" "The Commander Is Missing"	December 8, 1979
"Prehistoric Hi-Jinx": Mini and Maxi get assigned to guard a scientist's lab, and Casper, Hairy, Nerdley and Fungo follow them to keep an eye on things. When the boys arrive at the lab, all but Casper accidentally trigger a time machine and wind up in prehistoric times, and its up to the others to rescue them.; "The Commander Is Missing": The ghosts and the angels must solve the mystery of the missing statue of the Commander.
13	"Love at First Fright" "Savin' Grace in Outer Space"	December 15, 1979
"Love at First Fright": Hairy falls head over tailsheet for Zsa Zsa Amour the stage actress after seeing her image on a poster. When Mini and Maxi get assigned to guard Zsa Zsa's dressing-room to protect her diamond tiara, Hairy begs to come along.; "Savin' Grace in Outer Space": The Commander's niece Grace is a troublesome brat. When she sneaks aboard a stolen space vehicle, she is able to alert Casper, Hairy Scarey, and The Angels to the thieves' location.

== Home media ==
On September 5, 1995, Turner Home Entertainment released two volumes The Boo Zoo and Stars & Frights on VHS. This release contained five episodes from the series. In addition, on August 22, 2000, Warner Home Video released Casper Saves Halloween on VHS, which contained the Halloween special as well as six 15-minute episodes of Casper and the Angels.
