= Casper Meets Wendy =

- VHS cover
- Directed by: Sean McNamara
- Written by: Jymn Magon
- Based on: Casper the Friendly Ghost by: Seymour Reit; Joe Oriolo; Wendy the Good Little Witch; by Steve Mufatti (artist)
- Produced by: Mike Elliott
- Starring: Cathy Moriarty; Shelley Duvall; Teri Garr; George Hamilton; Hilary Duff; Richard Moll; Vincent Schiavelli; Blake Foster; Voices: Jeremy Foley; Bill Farmer; Jim Ward; Jess Harnell
- Cinematography: Christian Sebaldt
- Edited by: John Gilbert
- Music by: Udi Harpaz
- Production companies: The Harvey Entertainment Company; Saban Entertainment; Brookwell McNamara Entertainment
- Distributed by: 20th Century Fox Home Entertainment
- Release date: September 22, 1998
- Running time: 94 minutes
- Country: United States
- Language: English
- Budget: $10 million

Casper Meets Wendy is a 1998 American fantasy comedy film based on the Harvey Comics cartoon characters Casper the Friendly Ghost and Wendy the Good Little Witch. The film is a standalone sequel to Casper: A Spirited Beginning, and the second spin-off/prequel of Casper (1995). Saban Entertainment co-produced the project.

This was Hilary Duff's first major film, and was released by 20th Century Fox Home Entertainment on September 22, 1998, six days before her 11th birthday. The film also marks the second Casper film for co-star Cathy Moriarty, who previously starred as the main antagonist in the 1995 film.

The film was met with mostly negative reviews from critics, but was considered an improvement to its predecessor. Its television premiere was October 24, 1999, on Fox Family.

== Plot ==
The Ghostly Trio (Stretch, Stinkie, and Fatso) interrupt and cause panic at a baseball game, and when their nephew Casper attempts to settle the terrified crowd, the park empties. After watching their effect with satisfaction, Casper's uncles plan a vacation.

Meanwhile, A malevolent warlock named Desmond Spellman believes himself to be the greatest warlock to have existed, until he is informed by the Oracle in the Mirror that in the future, none other than Wendy the Good Little Witch will surpass him. To avoid this, Desmond plans to get rid of her with the advised "Mystic Abyss", a dimensional rift that can destroy living beings. He then creates a pair of spies: Jules and Vincent, and assigns them to bring Wendy to him from where she is living in the country with her three mischievous aunts: Gert, Gabby, and Fanny.

Jules and Vincent arrive at Wendy's home to capture her, but she narrowly escapes with her aunts. To keep Wendy safe from Desmond, her aunts hide and vacation at the same resort hotel in which Casper and his uncles are vacationing. Wendy meets a boy named Josh Jackman, and attempts to befriend him until he shows his true colors by pushing a girl away from her game at the arcade and ignoring Wendy when she tries to talk to him in the middle of the game. Casper and Wendy soon meet in a barn and become great friends, but they fear that their respective guardians will not get along because ghosts and witches are natural enemies. Casper and Wendy devise a plan to make them meet at a party that night. Casper manipulates the Ghostly Trio to possess three men who happen to resemble them, while Wendy convinces her aunts to go to the party to meet men. Thanks to their plotting, they meet and soon the Trio are flirting with the three witches, who are posing as regular women.

The plan is spoiled when the possession wears off and the Trio's real selves are revealed to Wendy's aunts, who, in turn, reveal their real selves and threaten them with magic. Wendy explains to Casper that she and her aunts cannot use any magic strong enough to affect ghosts or else Desmond will be able to track them down. She begs him to keep this a secret, but unfortunately, the Trio begin to suspect Casper is protecting the witches; they interrogate and pressure him into blurting out that the witches cannot use their powers, prompting the Trio to terrorize Wendy and her aunts. Wendy feels she has no choice but to cast a high-level spell to cover the Trio in plaster, thus alerting Desmond's magic tracker of her location.

Distraught that Casper broke his promise, Wendy ends their friendship. a forlorn Casper soon confronts his uncles and tells them that Desmond is after the witches and they should help, at which the Trio initially scoff and refuse. Before the witches can evacuate the resort, Desmond and his minions arrive. After finding and confronting the witches, Desmond explains the Oracle's prediction, and after she tries to resist him, summons the Mystic Abyss and casts Wendy into it, with Casper diving inside in an attempt to rescue her. Wendy reconciles with Casper as her aunts battle Desmond, but are no match for him. Before Desmond can turn the witches into fertilizer, a giant three-eyed monster appears and frightens the warlock who trips over Wendy's broom and falls into the Abyss himself. The monster turns out to be the Ghostly Trio, who have a change of heart. While they hold the door to the Abyss open, Wendy's aunts pull her and Casper out.

Both Casper and Wendy are unconscious from being inside the Abyss, but with encouragement and comfort from their guardians, Casper is restored by his uncles, and Wendy is treated by her aunts. After a touching reunion between the witches and an awkward one between the ghosts, the witches thank the Trio for helping them and the Trio admit it was nice getting to know them, and Casper and Wendy's friendship is restored. The Oracle then proclaims that Wendy is the greatest witch because she did something no other witch ever could: she befriended a ghost. Later, Casper, his uncles, Wendy, and her aunts, all bid each other goodbye. Before flying back home with her aunts, Wendy gives Casper a goodbye kiss, causing him to blush.

== Cast ==
=== Main ===
==== Live-action ====
- Hilary Duff as Wendy the Good Witch
- Cathy Moriarty as Gert
- Shelley Duvall as Gabby
- Teri Garr as Fanny
- George Hamilton as Desmond Spellman
- Richard Moll as Jules
- Vincent Schiavelli as Vincent
- Blake Foster as Josh Jackman
- Rodger Halston as Larry Tullby
- Logan Robbins as Logan
- Michael McDonald as Stretch
- Travis McKenna as Fatso
- Patrick Richwood as Stinkie

==== Voice ====
- Jeremy Foley as Casper the Friendly Ghost
- Bill Farmer as Stinkie, Casper's uncle in the Ghostly Trio
- Jess Harnell as Fatso, Casper's other uncle in the Ghostly Trio
- Jim Ward as Stretch, Casper's other uncle in the Ghostly Trio

=== Supporting ===
- Pauly Shore as The Oracle
- Alan Thicke as Baseball Announcer
- Casper Van Dien as Crewcut Hunk
- Billy Burnette as Chef
- Maria Ford as Playmate
- Jim Wise as Hungry Fan
- Patricia Elliott as Snotty Woman (credited as Pat Elliot)
- Rodman Flender as Agile Dancer
- Elizabeth Gage as Swift Dancer
- Larry Robbins as Boogie-Lovin' Dude
- Ben Stein as Lawyer

== Production ==
Shortly after the release of Casper: A Spirited Beginning, The Harvey Entertainment Company announced in September 1997 that it would once again partner with Saban Entertainment to produce a follow-up film, entitled Casper Meets Wendy, for a Fall 1998 release. The deal was part of Harvey's lucrative focus on the direct-to-video market and would feature Wendy the Good Little Witch. Harvey CEO Jeffrey A. Montgomery stated that the addition of Wendy would bring strong kid appeal and be effective towards the "underserved pre-teen girls audience." while Saban CEO and Chairman Haim Saban stated that the Harvey characters "broad appeal among children as well as adults" made the idea viable to both companies. The film was put into production shortly afterward.

As with its predecessor, Casper Meets Wendy was produced on a $10 million budget.

== Critical reception ==
Casper Meets Wendy received mostly negative reviews from critics, with a total of 6 reviews from critics on the review aggregator Rotten Tomatoes. 17% gave the film a positive review, with an average score of 4.10/10, which gives the film a slight improvement over its predecessor, but still low compared to the 1995 theatrical film.

Hilary Duff was nominated for a Young Artist Award.

== Soundtrack alteration ==
In the original airing and VHS release of the film, the Casper theme can be heard in the opening sequence performed by Shana Halligan. In the subsequent DVD releases the lyric is muted though the melody and sound effects remain intact. Halligan is still credited with performing the theme song.

== See also ==
- List of ghost films
- List of films about witchcraft
