= Casper's First Christmas =

1979 American Christmas animated TV special

- VHS cover
- Genre: Comedy
- Based on: Casper the Friendly Ghost by Seymour Reit; Joe Oriolo Characters by Hanna-Barbera Productions
- Story by: Bob Ogle
- Directed by: Carl Urbano
- Starring: Julie McWhirter; Daws Butler; Don Messick; Hal Smith; John Stephenson
- Music by: Hoyt Curtin
- Country of origin: United States
- Original language: English

Production
- Executive producers: William Hanna; Joseph Barbera
- Producer: Alex Lovy
- Editor: Robert Ciaglia
- Running time: 30 minutes
- Production companies: Hanna-Barbera Productions; Harvey Films

Original release
- Network: NBC
- Release: December 18, 1979

Casper's First Christmas is a 1979 American animated Christmas television special and crossover produced by Hanna-Barbera. It features Casper the Friendly Ghost and his friend Hairy Scarey from the animated series Casper and the Angels. The special features guest stars Yogi Bear, Boo-Boo, Huckleberry Hound, Snagglepuss, Quick Draw McGraw, and Augie Doggie and Doggie Daddy. It aired on NBC on December 18, 1979.

The theme song, "Comin' Up Christmas Time", sung by Yogi's pals was used again a year later in Yogi's First Christmas, depicting a different premise in which Yogi and Boo Boo (who, being bears are supposed to be hibernating in the winter) can be seen celebrating Christmas with the other cast members. "Comin' Up Christmas Time" was released on Hanna-Barbera's Christmas Sing-A-Long album on CD and cassette in 1991 and is currently on various streaming services.

This also marked the first and only time that this special pairs together the characters from its owners, Hanna-Barbera and Harvey Entertainment. Like many animated productions created by Hanna-Barbera in the 1970s, the special contained a laugh track created by the studio and is also the last Hanna-Barbera Christmas special to do so.

Network Ten aired the special in Australia.

== Plot ==
Casper and his friend Hairy Scary are in a house about to be demolished on Christmas Eve and go out to look for a new place to move to after Christmas in California. Yogi and his friends get lost and arrive at Casper and Hairy's house and clean and decorate it to celebrate Christmas. Casper befriends Yogi and company only for Hairy to try to ruin the party with Casper and his new friends. Hairy has a change of heart and celebrates Christmas with Casper and his new friends and ending with Santa Claus saving the house and turning it into Hairy's Haunting Lodge.

== Cast ==
- Julie McWhirter as Casper the Friendly Ghost
- Daws Butler as Yogi Bear / Huckleberry Hound / Quick Draw McGraw / Snagglepuss / Augie Doggie
- Don Messick as Boo-Boo Bear
- Hal Smith as Santa Claus
- John Stephenson as Hairy Scary the Ghost / Doggie Daddy
- Paul DeKorte as Singer #1
- Ida Sue McCune as Singer #2
- Michael Redman as Singer #3

== Home media ==
Turner Home Entertainment released Casper's First Christmas on VHS on September 26, 1995. Warner Bros. released Hanna-Barbera Christmas Classics Collection on DVD in region 1 via their Warner Archive Collection in July 2012; this was a Manufacture-on-Demand (MOD) release, available only at e-commerce sites and only in the US. This collection features a trilogy of Christmas specials: Casper's First Christmas, The Town That Santa Forgot and A Christmas Story.

=== VHS release dates ===
- December 4, 1986 (Worldvision Home Video)
- December 3, 1987 (Worldvision Home Video/Kids Klassics Home Video)
- 1991 (Hanna-Barbera Home Video)
- September 26, 1995 (Turner Home Entertainment)
- September 29, 1998 (Warner Home Video)
- November 2, 1999 (Warner Home Video)
- October 31, 2000 (Warner Home Video)
- October 16, 2001 (Warner Home Video)

=== DVD release date ===
July 31, 2012 (Warner Home Video/Warner Archive)

== See also ==
- Casper's Halloween Special
- Casper and the Angels
- List of Christmas films
