= Casper's Halloween Special =

1979 American animated Halloween TV special

- VHS cover
- Genre: Comedy; Sci-fi
- Based on: Casper the Friendly Ghost by Seymour Reit; Joe Oriolo
- Written by: Larz Bourne; Bob Ogle
- Directed by: Carl Urbano
- Voices of: Julie McWhirter; John Stephenson; Gerg Alter; Lucille Bliss; Diana McCannon; Julie McWhirter; Marilyn Schreffler; Hal Smith; Ginny Tyler; Frank Welker; Michael Sheehan
- Composer: Hoyt Curtin
- Country of origin: United States
- Original language: English

Production
- Executive producers: William Hanna; Joseph Barbera
- Producer: Alex Lovy
- Production companies: Hanna-Barbera Productions; Harvey Films

Original release
- Network: NBC
- Release: October 30, 1979

Casper's Halloween Special (also known as Casper Saves Halloween and Casper the Friendly Ghost: He Ain't Scary, He's Our Brother) is a 1979 American animated Halloween television special produced by Hanna-Barbera featuring Casper the Friendly Ghost and his friend Hairy Scarey from the animated series Casper and the Angels. The special was directed by Carl Urbano and premiered on NBC on October 30, 1979.

Like many productions created by Hanna-Barbera in the 1970s, the special includes a laugh track created by the studio.

== Plot ==
On Halloween night, Hairy Scary the Ghost, Winifred the Witch and Screech the Ghost are plotting their mean-spirited spookings. Casper refuses to join them and decides to go trick-or-treating dressed as a real boy, but neighborhood kids see through his disguise and run away in fear. Casper is heartbroken until he meets a special group of orphans who accept him for who he is, a ghost. Their fun is soon spoiled as Hairy Scarey and his ghostly crew interfere. Now it is up to Casper and his new friends to stop their ghastly games and save Halloween before it is too late.

== Cast ==
- Julie McWhirter as Casper the Friendly Ghost
- John Stephenson as Hairy Scary the Ghost / The Butler / Rural Man
- Hal Smith as Mr. Duncan / Skull
- Diane McCannon as J.R.
- Marilyn Schreffler as Winifred The Witch
- Frank Welker as Black Cat / Nice Man / Dog
- Ginny Tyler as Lovella / Bejewelled Dowager / Rural Lady
- Lucille Bliss as Gervais / Carmelita / Nice Lady
- Michael Sheehan as Screech The Ghost
- Greg Alter as Dirk

== Home media ==
Turner Home Entertainment released Casper Saves Halloween on VHS on August 29, 1995.

Warner Bros. released Casper's Halloween Special on DVD in region 1 via their Warner Archive Collection in October 2013. This is a manufacture-on-demand (MOD) release, available exclusively through Warner's online store and Amazon.com. Also included on this disc is the 1972 special The Thanksgiving That Almost Wasn't, also produced by Hanna-Barbera.

== See also ==
- Casper's First Christmas
- Casper and the Angels
- List of films set around Halloween
