= The Spooktacular New Adventures of Casper =

- Based on: Casper the Friendly Ghost by: Seymour Reit; Joe Oriolo
- Developed by: Sherri Stoner; Deanna Oliver
- Directed by: Alfred Gimeno (seasons 1–2); Marija Miletic Dail (seasons 3–4)
- Voices of: Malachi Pearson; Kath Soucie; Dan Castellaneta; Joe Nipote; Joe Alaskey; Brad Garrett; Rob Paulsen; Miriam Flynn; Tress MacNeille
- Composers: Michael Tavera; Thom Sharp; Bruce Babcock; Charles Fernandez; Harvey Cohen; Ron Grant
- Country of origin: United States
- Original language: English
- No. of seasons: 4
- No. of episodes: 52 (143 segments)

Production
- Executive producer: Jeffrey A. Montgomery
- Producers: Alfred Gimeno (seasons 1–2); Marija Miletic Dail (seasons 3–4)
- Editors: Paul D. Calder; Ken Solomon
- Production companies: Amblin Television; The Harvey Entertainment Company; Universal Cartoon Studios

Original release
- Network: Fox Kids
- Release: February 24, 1996 – October 17, 1998

Related
- Casper (1995)

The Spooktacular New Adventures of Casper is an American animated television spin-off series and a sequel of the feature film Casper, which, in turn, was based on the Harvey Comics cartoon character of Casper the Friendly Ghost.

== Production ==
At the time that principal filming wrapped on Casper, a sequel was proposed and a treatment was written, but a combination of less-than-stellar box office gross (although the film grossed $100 million in the US, the budget was more than half of that total and analysts predicted much higher earnings for the film) and the fact that both Christina Ricci and Bill Pullman were attached to other projects after Casper and would not be available until more than a year later caused the idea to be scrapped. The producers then decided to abandon the live-action sequel ideas and instead develop a cartoon series to continue the story.

In March 1995, it was reported that Harvey Entertainment had partnered with Universal Pictures to jointly finance a new Universal based animation studio with the intention of adapting Harvey's library of characters and IPs for television. The first two projects to be developed by the studio were announced to be a new Richie Rich TV series and a new TV series based around Casper the Friendly Ghost.

The show aired on Fox Kids television from 1996–98 for 4 seasons. 52 episodes were produced, but only the first 46 appeared on Fox, with the remaining debuting on Fox Family Channel. Many of the same people who worked on this show also worked on Tiny Toon Adventures, Animaniacs and Pinky and the Brain (the latter of which was a spin-off from the former; coincidentally, the former had also debuted on Fox).

The new Casper broke from earlier versions, following a sitcom-style pattern of one-liners and pop culture gags in a manner similar to the Casper feature. The show would also frequently break the fourth wall. The show used old Casper supporting characters such as Casper's cousin Spooky, Spooky's "ghoulfriend" Pearl (or "Poil" as rendered by Spooky's Brooklyn accent), and Nightmare the Ghost Horse who, unlike in the original cartoons and comics, does not talk. The show also introduced new characters, including Casper's loud and strict teacher Ms. Banshee.

== Characters ==
=== Main characters ===
- Casper (voiced by Malachi Pearson) is a young ghost who lives in his family home of Whipstaff Manor in the care of his three trouble-making uncles, Stretch, Stinkie and Fatso, and has to put up with their antics.
- The Ghostly Trio is a trio of ghosts consisting of Stretch (voiced by Joe Nipote, additional dialogue by Rob Paulsen), Fatso (voiced by Brad Garrett in season 1-2, Jess Harnell in season 3-4), and Stinkie (voiced by Joe Alaskey). They are Casper's uncles who enjoy scaring humans. The Ghostly Trio constantly mistreat and abuse Casper by either having him make their dinner or chasing after him.
- Dr. James Harvey (voiced by Dan Castellaneta) is a psychiatrist and is shown to be an alumnus of Johns Hopkins University who loves his daughter Kat, although he sometimes appears to be neglectful of her emotional needs.
- Kathleen "Kat" Harvey (voiced by Kath Soucie) is the 13-year-old daughter of Dr. Harvey who is portrayed as the stereotypical teenager, who has a sense of humor and hates having to put up with the Ghostly Trio because they do not get along with her.
- Spooky (voiced by Rob Paulson) is Casper's mischief-minded cousin who looks up to the Ghostly Trio as his heroes and while having no true dislike for Casper, despises his cousin's lack of interest in scaring humans. As such, Spooky is always trying to out-scare Casper and become the best in class, but he usually fails.
- Pearl (voiced by Miriam Flynn) or "Poil" is Spooky's absent-minded girlfriend, who is almost always oblivious to current situations and takes things too literally. She adores Spooky and everything about him, is good friends with Casper, and does not care as much for the Ghostly Trio as Spooky does.
- Miss Banshee (voiced by Tress MacNeille) is the teacher of Casper, Spooky and Poil. True to her name, Miss Banshee can scream loud enough to be heard. Miss Banshee enjoys being a teacher, but dreams of being a professional opera singer. The Ghostly Trio has a crush on Miss Banshee and constantly compete for her affections, though she is unimpressed with their efforts.

=== Recurring characters ===
- Amber Whitmire (voiced by Sherry Lynn) and the Jennifers (voiced by Debi Derryberry) are classmates and rivals of Kat at Friendship Junior High School who are portrayed as rich, mean, and spoiled queen bees. Jennifer #1 has dark brown hair and wears glasses and is the closest to Amber, Jennifer #2 has strawberry blonde hair, and Jennifer #3 has light brown hair and is the least intelligent of the three.
- Mr. Happ (voiced by Ben Stein) is the monotonous teacher at Friendship Junior High School.

== Episodes ==
=== Series overview ===
Season	Episodes	Originally released	
Season	Episodes	First released	Last released
1	10	February 24, 1996	May 18, 1996
2	16	September 7, 1996	February 22, 1997
3	20	September 6, 1997	February 27, 1998
4	6	September 12, 1998	October 17, 1998

=== Season 1 (1996) ===
No. overall	No. in season	Title	Original release date
1	1	"Spooking Bee" "Fugedabouit" "The Flew"	February 24, 1996
2	2	"Paws" "The Alphabet Song" "Is So Too"	March 2, 1996
3	3	"Legend of Duh Bigfoot" "The Ghostly Day" "Invasion of the UGFO's"	March 9, 1996
4	4	"Rocket Booster" "A Really Scary Casper Moment" "The Day of the Living Casper"	March 16, 1996
5	5	"3 Boos and a Babe" "The Whipstaff Inmates" "Elusive Exclusive"	March 30, 1996
6	6	"Paranormal Press" "Another Spooky and Poil Moment" "Deadstock"	April 20, 1996
7	7	"Poil Jammed" "The Who That I Am" "A Picture Says a Thousand Words"	April 27, 1996
8	8	"Spooks, Lies and Videotapes" "Ghostfather"	May 4, 1996
9	9	"Rebel Without a Date" "Don't Bank on It"	May 11, 1996
10	10	"Casper vs. the Ultimate Fan Boy" "Field of Screams"	May 18, 1996

=== Season 2 (1996–97) ===
No. overall	No. in season	Title	Original release date
11	1	"Grim and Bare It" "Fatso of the Opera"	September 7, 1996
12	2	"Dead of the Class" "A Spooky and Poil Moment" "Y-Files"	September 14, 1996
13	3	"Losing Face" "Galloping Ghost"	September 21, 1996
14	4	"Aunt Misbehavin'" "Split Personalities"	September 28, 1996
15	5	"Something to Stink About" "Pulp Friction"	October 5, 1996
16	6	"Ectospasms" "Stink of the Road" "Doc's Depression"	October 12, 1996
17	7	"Boo to the Future" "All That Falderal"	October 19, 1996
18	8	"Spooky and Poil Meet the Monsters" "You Know You're Alive When..." "13 Ways to Scare a Fleshie" "The Trick's a Treat"	October 26, 1996
19	9	"Frightening Storm" "The Ghostly Trio" "The Legend of Whitebeard"	November 2, 1996
20	10	"Three Ghosts and a Baby" "I Wanna Be Rude" "Leave It to Casper"	November 9, 1996
21	11	"Luck of the Spookish" "Daycare Nightmare"	November 16, 1996
22	12	"Scream Card" "You Know You're Alive When..." "Lady Screams the Boos"	November 23, 1996
23	13	"A Christmas Peril" "Ms. Banshee's Holiday Hits" "Good Morning Dr. Harvey" "Fright Before Christmas"	December 21, 1996
24	14	"A Midsummer's Night Scream" "You Know You're Alive When..." "Auntie Maimed"	February 7, 1997
25	15	"Gargoils" "Ms. Banshee's Public Domain Hits" "Boosom Buddies"	February 14, 1997
26	16	"What Goes Around" "Scavenger Haunt"	February 21, 1997

=== Season 3 (1997–98) ===
No. overall	No. in season	Title	Original release date
27	1	"Columboo" "All About "C""	September 6, 1997
28	2	"Hat Sick" "Cancion de Olor" "The Boo-Muda Triangle"	September 13, 1997
29	3	"Intensive Scare" "F-A-T-S-O" "Stench!"	September 20, 1997
30	4	"The Phantom of the Oprah" "Stretch's Information Tidbit" "The Crying Game"	September 27, 1997
31	5	"Free Goldie" "I'd Pick Your Nose" "Birthday Boos"	October 4, 1997
32	6	"Rats!" "Stinkie Time Theater" "Great Ghouly Governess"	October 11, 1997
33	7	"Aboove the Law" "Ten Little Fatsos" "Haunt-a-Thon"	October 31, 1997
34	8	"This Old Manor" "Scareobicize"	November 3, 1997
35	9	"Gingersnap Out of It" "Send a Good Stink Up Their Noses" "Ghostly Locks and the Three Scares"	November 10, 1997
36	10	"Boopardy" "Do You Like Me?" "MacDeath!"	November 17, 1997
37	11	"The Scummies" "Three-Ring Whipstaff" "It's Best to Be the Most"	November 27, 1997
38	12	"The Son Also Rises" "Stretching Is Good for You" "Ghostfinger"	December 12, 1997
39	13	"Mom Always Likes Ghouls Best" "Dare to Scare" "Bury Maguire"	December 19, 1997
40	14	"Four Funerals and a Wedding" "I Can Be Anything" "Family Reunion"	February 6, 1998
41	15	"Horrid Copy" "I'm Nothing Without My Hat" "Caspeer Pressure"	February 13, 1998
42	16	"That Thing You Boo!" "A Good Walk Poiled"	February 13, 1998
43	17	"Jasper" "It's Great to Be a Ghost" "The Boo-Bloods of Whipstaff"	February 20, 1998
44	18	"Ghost Jam" "Do the Spooky" "Dr. Harvey and Mr. Gruesome"	February 20, 1998
45	19	"Politically Co-Wrecked Casper" "Three Little Letters" "Pen and Tell Her"	February 27, 1998
46	20	"Jack and the Scream Stalk" "Boo Bash a Bone Bag" "Artistic? That's a Stretch!"	February 27, 1998

=== Season 4 (1998) ===
No. overall	No. in season	Title	Original release date
47	1	"Scaredy Boo, Where Have You Got To?" "Casper's New Theme Song" "The Daunting Game"	September 12, 1998
48	2	"At the BOO-vies" "Sing Yourself Happy" "Snowball's Chance"	September 19, 1998
49	3	"NYPD BOO" "Three Cool Ghouls" "Working Ghouls"	September 26, 1998
50	4	"Scream Test" "Ms. Banshee's Kid Songs" "The Doctor Is Out"	October 3, 1998
51	5	"Miami Nice" "If You're Unhappy and You Know It" "That Advice Stinks"	October 10, 1998
52	6	"BOO-kini Beach" "Garlic Bread Man"	October 17, 1998

== Voice cast ==
- Malachi Pearson as Casper
- Kath Soucie as Kat Harvey
- Dan Castellaneta as Dr. Harvey
- Joe Nipote as Stretch
- Brad Garrett as Fatso (season 1-2)
- Jess Harnell as Fatso (season 3-4), Piano Mover #1 (in "Day of the Living Casper")
- Joe Alaskey as Stinkie, Gorey Narrator, Baby Huey (in "The Legend of Duh Bigfoot")
- Rob Paulsen as Spooky, Stretch (additional dialogue), Frankenstein's monster (in "Spookie and Poil Meet the Monsters", "13 Ways to Scare a Fleshie"), Jimmy Hoffy (in "13 Ways to Scare a Fleshie")
- Tress MacNeille as Ms. Banshee
- Miriam Flynn as Poil

=== Additional voices ===
- Charlie Adler as T-Bone
- Carlos Alazraqui
- Jack Angel as Count Dracula (in "Spookie and Poil Meet the Monsters", "13 Ways to Scare a Fleshie")
- David Arnott
- Orlando Ashley
- Edward Asner
- John Astin
- Hinton Battle
- Jeff Bennett as Milk Shop Owner (in "Day of the Living Casper"), Agent Moldy (in "The Y-Files"), Wedgie Johnson, News Anchor, Astronaut
- Susanne Blakeslee as Willa Winkle
- S. Scott Bullock as Ghost of Christmas Yet to Come (in "A Christmas Peril")
- Jodi Carlisle
- Nancy Cartwright
- Christine Cavanaugh as Kid #1
- Cathy Cavadini as Kid #2
- Cam Clarke as The Prince
- David Coburn as James Dean (in "Rebel Without a Date")
- Jim Cummings as Water Cooler Guy #1, Babe Ruth (in "Field of Screams"), Werewolf (in "Spookie and Poil Meet the Monsters", "13 Ways to Scare a Fleshie"), Announcer, Albert Frankenstein, Krono, Ron, Phineas McHorde, Bronko, Babe Ruth, Ghost of Christmas Past (in "A Christmas Peril"), Santa Claus (in "A Christmas Peril")
- Tim Curry as Pianist (in "Stinkie Time Theater")
- E. G. Daily as Nicole Noelle Cadaver, Cinderella
- Debi Derryberry as the Jennifers
- Patti Deutsch
- Greg Eagles as Michael Jordan
- Michael Finnegan
- Benny Grant
- Gary Falcone
- Pat Fraley as Cleaner Ghost
- Mark Hamill as Ghost of Christmas Present (in "A Christmas Peril"), Ezra Hazzard
- Dorian Harewood
- Jonathan Harris as Omar (in "A Picture Says 1,000 Words")
- Edward Hibbert
- Dana Hill as Wee Willie Winkle
- Tony Jay as Grim Reaper (in "Grim and Bear It")
- Joe Lala
- Rick Logan
- Sherry Lynn as Amber Whitmire
- Steve Mackall
- Danny Mann as Lounge Host
- Kenneth Mars
- Gail Matthius
- Edie McClurg
- Ginny McSwain
- Ricardo Montalbán as Gone Juan
- Gary Owens as Haunt-a-Thon Announcer (in "Haunt-a-Thon")
- Valery Pappas as Auntie Froo-Froo (in "Family Reunion")
- Dee Dee Rescher
- Kevin Michael Richardson as Frightening Storm
- Neil Ross as Ghostfather (in "Ghostfather"), TV Voice
- Maggie Roswell
- Zelda Rubenstein
- Heidi Shannon as Agent Skully (in "The Y-Files")
- Ben Stein as Mr. Happ
- Sherri Stoner
- Mark L. Taylor as TV Voice #2
- Susan Tolsky
- B. J. Ward
- Frank Welker as Clarence, Mortimer Pennypincher (in "Don't Bank on It"), Nightmare the Horse
- Billy West
- Fred Willard as Wally Winkle
- Paul Williams
- April Winchell as Ms. C
- Michael York

== Crew ==
- Ginny McSwain - casting director and voice director (seasons 1–2)
- Kelly Ward - voice director (seasons 3–4)

== Home media ==
From 1996 through 1998, Universal Studios Home Video released episodes from seasons 1, 2, and 3 onto VHS.

In 2007/2008, Universal Studios Home Entertainment released two volume collections entitled The Spooktacular New Adventures of Casper, Volume 1 and The Spooktacular New Adventures of Casper, Volume 2 on DVD in Region 1. Volume 1 consists of the first 5 episodes of the animated series, while volume 2 contains the last 5 episodes of season 1.

No further plans have been made by Universal to release any further DVDs of the show.

=== United States ===
Video name (volumes)	Ep #	Release date	Episodes featured
Volume 1	6	September 17, 1996	"Spooking Bee"; "Fugedabouit"; "The Flew"; "Paws"; "The Alphabet Song"; "Is So Too"
Volume 2	6	September 17, 1996	"Three Boos and a Babe"; "The Whipstaff Inmates"; "Elusive Exclusive"; "Poil Jammed"; "The Who That I Am"; "A Picture Says a Thousand Words"
Volume 3	7	September 9, 1997	"Spooky and Poil Meet the Monsters"; "You Know You're Alive When..."; "The Ghostly Trio"; "The Trick's a Treat"; "Dead of the Class"; "A Spooky and Poil Moment"; "Y-Files"
Volume 4	7	September 9, 1997	"A Christmas Peril"; "Ms. Banshee's Holiday Hits"; "Another Spooky and Poil Moment"; "Fright Before Christmas"; "Three Ghosts and a Baby"; "I Wanna Be Rude"; "Leave It to Casper"
Volume 5	6	September 1, 1998	"Free Goldie"; "I'd Pick Your Nose"; "Birthday Boos"; "Four Funerals and a Wedding"; "I Can Be Anything"; "Family Reunion"
Volume 6	6	September 1, 1998	"Rats!"; "Stinkie Time Theater"; "Great Ghouly Governess"; "Hat Sick"; "Cancion de Olor"; "The Boo-Muda Triangle"

=== DVD ===
DVD name	Ep #	Number of discs	Total running time	Release date	Additional information
The Spooktacular New Adventures of Casper: Volume 1	5	1	107 minutes	September 18, 2007	This single-disc volume one set contains the first 5 episodes of the animated series.
The Spooktacular New Adventures of Casper: Volume 2	5	1	106 minutes	September 9, 2008	This single-disc volume two set contains the last 5 episodes of season 1.
