= Casper: A Spirited Beginning =

- Home video release poster
- Directed by: Sean McNamara
- Written by: Jymn Magon; Thomas Hart
- Story by: Thomas McCluskey; Rob Kerchner
- Based on: Casper the Friendly Ghost by Seymour Reit; Joe Oriolo
- Produced by: Mike Elliott
- Starring: Steve Guttenberg; Lori Loughlin; Rodney Dangerfield; Michael McKean; Brendon Ryan Barrett; Jeremy Foley; Bill Farmer; Jim Ward; Jess Harnell; James Earl Jones; Pauly Shore
- Cinematography: Christian Sebaldt
- Edited by: John Walts; John Gilbert
- Music by: Udi Harpaz; Jeremy Sweet; Inon Zur
- Production companies: The Harvey Entertainment Company; Saban Entertainment; Brookwell McNamara Entertainment; Fox Family Films
- Distributed by: 20th Century Fox Home Entertainment
- Release date: September 9, 1997 (United States)
- Running time: 90 minutes
- Country: United States
- Language: English
- Budget: $10 million

Casper: A Spirited Beginning is a 1997 American direct-to-video fantasy comedy film based on the Harvey Comics cartoon character Casper the Friendly Ghost. It serves as a prequel, though breaks continuity with the 1995 Universal/Amblin film Casper. The film stars Steve Guttenberg, Lori Loughlin, Rodney Dangerfield, Michael McKean, James Earl Jones and Pauly Shore, with supporting roles by Richard Moll, Sherman Hemsley, Brian Doyle-Murray, Edie McClurg and Ben Stein. The plot explores additional details surrounding the titular character's origins. 20th Century Fox had previously acquired film rights to the character from Universal. The film was produced by The Harvey Entertainment Company and Saban Entertainment and released by 20th Century Fox Home Entertainment on September 9, 1997, and was panned by critics.

== Plot ==
In a ghost train bound for Ghost Central, Casper is unaware of where he is or that he is a ghost. He is kicked off in the city of Deedstown and realizes his own nature after unintentionally scaring a bunch of the town's citizens. Meanwhile, Chris Carson, a lonely boy obsessed with the supernatural, has a strained relationship with his work-obsessed father Tim, who plans to demolish the historical Applegate Mansion to build a new mini-mall. A group of protestors, led by Chris's teacher Sheila Fistergraff, oppose the demolition, and the mansion is inhabited by the Ghostly Trio, consisting of Stretch, Fatso, and Stinkie. The Trio terrorize both the demolition crew and the protestors, cutting the demonstration short. Chris witnesses the commotion and wants to join the Trio, but they reject him because he is human.

At Ghost Central, where new spirits are trained in the art of haunting, the ghoul Kibosh is furious to discover Casper's absence and orders his spineless assistant Snivel to retrieve him. Back in Deedstown, the press confirms that Tim and Mayor Johnny Hunt will proceed with the demolition despite the setback, with the mayor threatening to dismiss Tim if he fails. Chris encounters and befriends Casper, who is surprised that a human is unafraid of him. Chris insists on teaching Casper to be a real ghost and introduces him to the Trio. The Trio, delighted that Casper has not been educated by Kibosh, decide to train him themselves, hoping to prove their worth and end Kibosh's pursuit. Snivel overhears this and reports the plan to Kibosh, enraging him. Casper masters invisibility, but fails at every other lesson. His desire to be friendly rather than frightening leads the Trio to expel him.

After Tim misses an open house at Chris's school, he promises to spend more time with him. Chris continues teaching Casper, who successfully uses his powers on the bully Brock and gets him into trouble with the principal, after which Casper begins helping people around town. When Tim again fails to appear at a parent-teacher conference, Chris and Casper prepare dinner for him. Snivel witnesses Casper acting in service to a human and informs Kibosh, who decides to retrieve Casper himself. The Trio discover Casper's good deeds and abduct him to save their reputation, which ruins Chris' opportunity to introduce Casper to Tim. Tim dismisses Chris and leaves to see the mayor. Feeling betrayed by Casper, Chris runs off, but is captured and locked inside the mansion by Brock and his gang, unaware that a professional bomber hired by Tim has planted an explosive.

The next morning, Kibosh arrives in Deedstown, captures the Trio, and sends Snivel after Casper. Tim learns that Chris ran away and meets Casper, and they both set out to find him. Casper races to the mansion just as it is about to explode, while Tim, riding with Sheila, arrives in time to extract Chris as Casper swallows the bomb, which detonates harmlessly inside him. Kibosh is impressed by Casper's technique, which Casper claims was taught to him by the Trio, and Kibosh allows the Trio to stay and haunt. The Trio, in turn, secure permission for Casper to stay with them by claiming to be his uncles after Kibosh stresses the importance of family, and Kibosh departs peacefully. Chris and Tim reconcile, a classmate turns on the bullies and apologizes to Chris, and the Trio hang Brock's gang from a tree by their underwear. Casper proclaims himself Casper the Friendly Ghost.

== Cast ==
=== Live-action cast ===
- Brendon Ryan Barrett as Chris Carson
- Steve Guttenberg as Tim Carson, Chris's widowed father
- Lori Loughlin as Sheila Fistergraff, Chris's teacher and Tim's love interest
- Rodney Dangerfield as Mayor Johnny Hunt
- Michael McKean as Bill Case
- Shannon Chandler as Jennifer, Chris's love interest
- Steven Hartman as Brock Lee, Chris's rival and Jennifer's former love interest
- Logan Robbins as Danny, Brock's friend
- D'Juan Watts as Leon, Brock's other friend
- Brian Doyle-Murray as Foreman Dave
- Sherman Hemsley as Store Owner
- Edie McClurg as Librarian
- Richard Moll as Principal Rabie
- Ben Stein as Grocer
- Rodger Halston as Stan
- Casper Van Dien as Bystander
- Michael James McDonald as Sarcastic Protester
- Debi Mazar as Angie Lyons, Tim’s secretary

=== Voice cast ===
- Jeremy Foley as Casper, a young bald-headed ghost kid
- Bill Farmer as Stinkie, Casper's adoptive uncle and the member of the Ghostly Trio
- Jess Harnell as Fatso, Casper's other adoptive uncle and the member of the Ghostly Trio
- James Ward as Stretch, Casper's other adoptive uncle and the leader of the Ghostly Trio
- Pauly Shore as Snivel, Kibosh's assistant
- James Earl Jones as Kibosh, the evil, cruel, vicious, mean-spirited king of all Ghosts

== Production ==
In May 1997, it was announced that Harvey Entertainment would be producing a direct-to-video film with Saban Entertainment and 20th Century Fox Home Entertainment. According to Jeff Montgomery, then Chairman of Harvey Entertainment, when Universal paid $750,000 to acquire the rights to a Casper film and any theatrical sequels they did not account for the direct-to-video market which at the time was dominated by pornography and low-budget action films. Mongomery had attempted to meet with Universal Pictures in 1996 to renegotiate for direct-to-video rights due to the success in the market with The Land Before Time series and Disney's Aladdin sequels, but the management consisting of Corporate Operations Chief Howard Weitzman and Executive Vice President Sandy Climan failed to deliver a worthwhile offer.

While Universal planned their own sequel to the 1995 film Casper for a tentative 1999 release, Harvey Entertainment, which owned the rights to the IP, shopped the property around looking for other studios interested in producing projects based on the character. After the merchandising portion of Universal's rights to Casper the Friendly Ghost expired in April 1996, Universal retained certain rights such as the in-development theatrical sequel and the animated television series The Spooktacular New Adventures of Casper while Harvey itself managed to secure the rights to produce direct-to-video productions off its characters and signed a production deal with Saban Entertainment. Harvey eventually set up production of a direct-to-video prequel film with 20th Century Fox Home Entertainment. Montogomery said that Fox and Saban were chosen as the partners on the project as they were the fastest to move out of any of their competetors, and their partnership in the Fox Kids Network which aired the The Spooktacular New Adventures of Casper which gave an incentive for cross-promotion. According to Haim Saban, a screening of the film for distribution reps from Walmart was met with a standing ovation. After finishing work on 3 Ninjas: High Noon at Mega Mountain, director Sean McNamara approached producer Mike Elliott about the directing job and after showing Elliott 3 Ninjas, McNamara was hired. The film was produced on a $10 million budget.

Various insiders speculated that a Casper direct-to-video project could potential curtail development of Universal's theatrical sequel such as providing a more inexpensive counterpart already available to consumers or creating a product of poor quality that taints the brand.

== Critical reception ==
Based on 5 reviews on review aggregator Rotten Tomatoes, 0% of critics gave the film a positive review, with an average rating of 2.2/10.

== Soundtrack ==
A soundtrack album, containing songs from the film, was released on CD and cassette by EMI-Capitol on October 24, 1997.

Track listing
| No. | Title | Artist(s) | Length |
|---|---|---|---|
| 1. | "Casper, the Friendly Ghost" (opening theme) | KC and the Sunshine Band and Kool & the Gang featuring James "J.T." Taylor | 3:30 |
| 2. | "Love Sensation" | 911 | 3:36 |
| 3. | "Delicious" | Shampoo | 2:59 |
| 4. | "Mansize Rooster" | Supergrass | 2:34 |
| 5. | "Best Friend" | C.T.F.G. | 2:57 |
| 6. | "I'm Not Alone" | Ellen ten Damme | 2:38 |
| 7. | "Don't Worry, Be Happy" | Bobby McFerrin | 3:54 |
| 8. | "I Wanna Be with You" | Backstreet Boys | 4:05 |
| 9. | "Spooky Madness" | Big Bad Voodoo Daddy | 3:00 |
| 10. | "Kandy Pop" | Bis | 2:46 |
| 11. | "No One Lives Forever" | Oingo Boingo | 4:14 |
| 12. | "Big Bomb Bomb" | Whitey Don | 3:54 |
| 13. | "You're in Trouble" | C.T.F.G. | 2:46 |

=== Score ===
The film's score was composed and conducted by Udi Harpaz. The score includes the 1980 John Williams recording of Alfred Newman's 20th Century Fox fanfare, which was used in Star Wars films including The Empire Strikes Back, Return of the Jedi, The Phantom Menace, Attack of the Clones and Revenge of the Sith.

Track listing
| No. | Title | Length |
|---|---|---|
| 1. | "20th Century Fox Fanfare" (composed by Alfred Newman; conducted by John Williams) | 0:23 |
| 2. | "Casper (Main Title)" | 2:36 |
| 3. | "Casper Scares Deedstown" | 1:11 |
| 4. | "Stop the Demolition" | 1:45 |
| 5. | "Brock vs. Chris" | 1:00 |
| 6. | "Trio in Action" | 2:36 |
| 7. | "Snivel's Training Station" | 2:22 |
| 8. | "Balloon Explodes on My Head" | 0:55 |
| 9. | "Sad Casper" | 1:14 |
| 10. | "Casper's Ghost Lesson" | 1:16 |
| 11. | "Trio Meets Casper" | 2:12 |
| 12. | "My Office Is on Fire!" | 1:34 |
| 13. | "More Trio Antics" | 1:09 |
| 14. | "Casper's Flying Lesson" | 0:58 |
| 15. | "Great Kid, Crummy Dad" | 1:57 |
| 16. | "Sheila's Surprise Visit" | 1:48 |
| 17. | "Dad Is Mad at Chris" | 1:39 |
| 18. | "Chris Is Leaving Home" | 3:01 |
| 19. | "Dad Meets Casper" | 2:14 |
| 20. | "Sheila and Dad to the Rescue" | 3:30 |
| 21. | "Stop the Bomb" | 2:56 |
| 22. | "The Old Mansion Survives" | 2:11 |
| 23. | "Father and Son" | 2:03 |
| 24. | "Finale" | 1:47 |

== Home media ==
Casper: A Spirited Beginning was released on VHS in 1997 and DVD in 2002, by 20th Century Fox Home Entertainment. It was re-released on DVD in 2005, by Classic Media and Sony Wonder, and has been re-released in 2021, by Universal Pictures Home Entertainment. The original VHS release included the US version of the music video for 911's "Love Sensation" as a special feature, though it has been omitted from the subsequent DVD releases.

== See also ==
- List of ghost films
