= Casper: Spirit Dimensions =

2001 video game

- French PlayStation 2 cover art
- Developer: Lucky Chicken Games
- Publisher: TDK Mediactive
- Engine: RenderWare
- Platforms: PlayStation 2, GameCube
- Release: PlayStation 2: NA: October 1, 2001; PAL: February 2, 2002; GameCube: NA: October 14, 2002; PAL: February 14, 2003
- Genre: Action-adventure
- Mode: Single-player

Casper: Spirit Dimensions is an action-adventure game published by TDK Mediactive in 2001 for the PlayStation 2 and then a year later for the GameCube. It is based on the Harvey Comics cartoon character Casper the Friendly Ghost.

== Gameplay ==
Casper: Spirit Dimensions a 3D action-adventure game. It is the first 3D game to have a movable camera in the Casper series. Both right and left analog sticks are needed to move Casper allowing him to fly up and down as well as forwards, backwards and sideways. Oddly, the default setting has the primary movement of Casper mapped to the right stick, and the viewpoint controlled with the left. This contrasts with the conventional dual-stick control layout of movement with the left stick and viewpoint with the right, though there is an option to switch it using the control configuration in the options menu. If Casper leaves a dimension before completing a task he must start the task all over again upon re-entry. Casper can move faster using his "Casper Comet" which uses his energy which he can recover while not using this power or by picking up a Ghost Speed sphere. Casper can fire super spirit blasts which use up a Ghost Power Point each time he uses this attack. Ghost Power Points can also be used to enable Casper's ethereal shield which make him temporarily invincible and allow him to pass through grated obstacles. Throughout the dimensions are ethereal energy spheres which allow Casper to enhance his attacks as well as restore his health, energy and Ghost Power Points. At seven points in the game Casper can choose a reward increasing his speed, health or power. In most dimensions before the Ghost Ship there are gems to collect with every 100 gems collected giving him an extra life (even a ghost can lose his soul according to Kibosh). If Casper loses a life, by losing all his health, he must restart the task he is on as if he left the dimension.

== Plot ==
Casper meets Wendy the Good Little Witch, who tells him that he is the only free ghost left who can defeat the evil Kibosh. Wendy uses her magic to open a door that leads Casper into the first dimension, the Medieval World. Casper meets the knight Sir Richard, who needs help with finding five parts of his armor and completing three other tasks to collect parts of the key to enter the cave to defeat the dragons which Kibosh put in charge of the Medieval World. After Casper defeats the dragons the Medieval World is free.

Casper goes back to his house to enter the second dimension, Vlad's Amusement Park. After collecting two parts of a ticket to enter the circus tent, Casper defeats Krank, a giant jack-in-the-box who Kibosh put in charge of the second dimension. In the third dimension, the Spirit Factory, Casper meets Professor Neutron who had been forced to build a machine that will make monsters for Kibosh. After collecting two parts of a key card, Casper defeats Professor Neutron's arch enemy Doctor Deranged and his robot. Back at Casper's house Wendy is captured by Kibosh then an older witch, Vanessa, who is a friend of Wendy opens the door to the next dimension. To get to Kibosh's Castle Casper has to take a Ghost Ship after defeating its captain, Pegleg Potbelly, who works for Kibosh.

Inside the castle, Casper needs to free the Guardian of Light, the rightful ruler of the Spirit World. In order to do this Casper has to complete four obstacle courses each with a generator at the end needed to be shut down to free the Guardian. After this, Casper proceeds to Kibosh's lair to face him. Upon defeating him, Casper frees Wendy who informs him that Kibosh went into the Dark, a dimension of eternal darkness which no ghost has returned from. Casper feels sorry for him feeling that no ghost deserves such a fate not even Kibosh. Wendy assures him that it is not his fault and the spirits Kibosh had imprisoned sent him there and he had no control over it. In the Dark, Kibosh swears that he will have revenge on Casper and ends with his evil laugh.

== Reception ==
Reception

Aggregate scores
| Aggregator | Score | |
| Aggregator | GameCube | PS2 |
|---|---|---|
| GameRankings | 57.5% (2 reviews) | 57.1% (12 reviews) |
| Metacritic | | 58% (7 reviews) |

Review score
| Publication | Score | |
| Publication | GameCube | PS2 |
|---|---|---|
| IGN | 5.5 out of 10 | 6.0 out of 10 |

The game received mixed reviews from critics, primarily criticizing its controls for moving. The unusual default analog stick configuration popularized the famous southpaw control scheme. Other critics noted that the game's imagery and themes may be too frightening or off-putting for children.
