= Casper the Friendly Ghost =

Fictional cartoon ghost

- Noveltoons/Casper the Friendly Ghost character
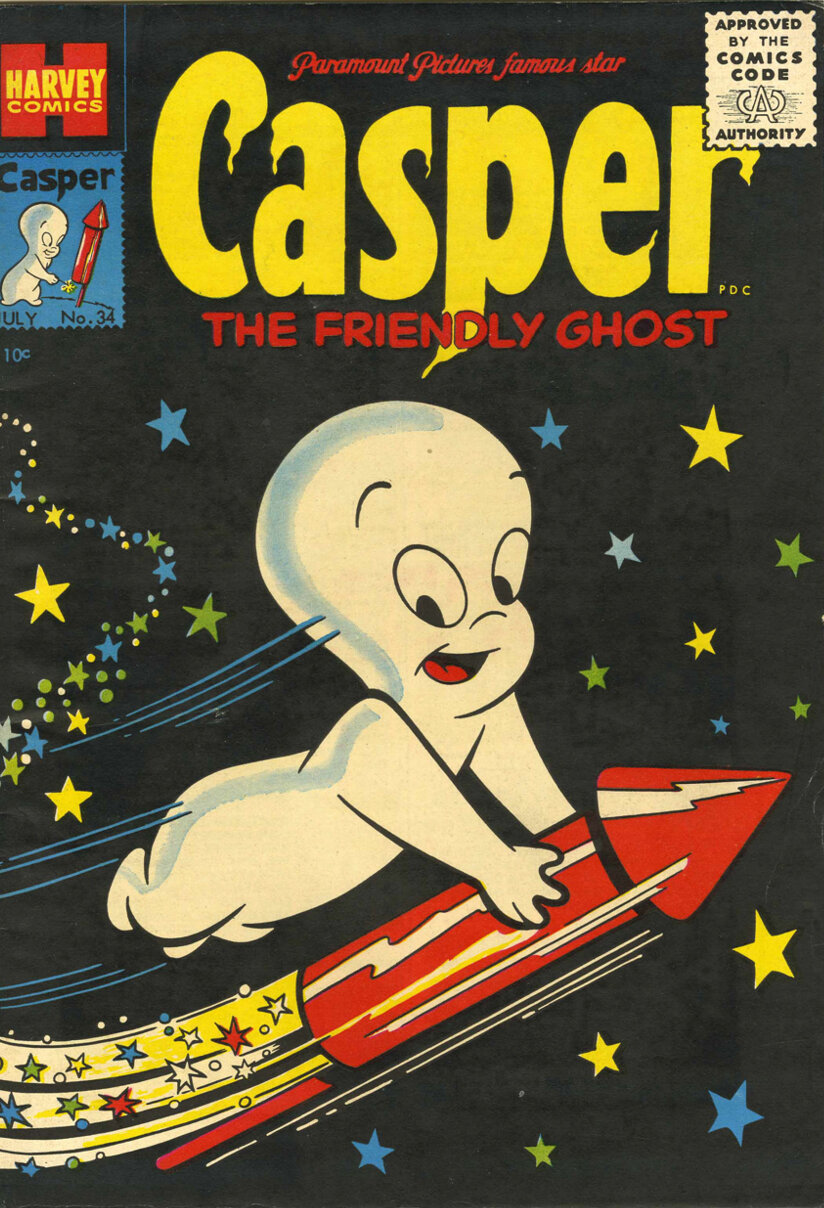
- Cover of Casper the Friendly Ghost #34 (July 1955)
- First appearance: The Friendly Ghost; (November 16, 1945)
- Created by: Seymour Reit; Joe Oriolo; Vincent E. Valentine II
- Adapted by: Harvey Comics
- Voiced by: See voice actors

In-universe information
- Race: Ghost (deceased human in some versions)
- Title: The Friendly Ghost
- Family: Ghostly Trio (uncles)

Casper the Friendly Ghost is a fictional character who appeared in animated short films produced by Paramount Pictures' Famous Studios. He is a translucent ghost who is personable and keen to socialize with living beings, much to the chagrin of his three wicked uncles, the Ghostly Trio.

The character was featured in 55 theatrical cartoons titled The Friendly Ghost from 1945 to 1959. The character has been featured in comic books published by Harvey Comics since 1952, and Harvey purchased the character outright in 1959. Casper became one of Harvey's most popular characters, headlining several comic book titles.

Following Harvey's purchase of the character, he appeared in five television series: Matty's Funday Funnies (1959–1961), The New Casper Cartoon Show (1963–1970), Casper and the Angels (1979), The Spooktacular New Adventures of Casper (1996–1998) and Casper's Scare School (2009–2012). The character made his theatrical film debut in a live-action adaptation of the series by Universal Pictures: Casper (1995), to where he became the first computer-generated character to star in a film. He would later appear in four direct-to-video and made-for-TV follow-up films.

The Apollo 16 Command and Service Module was given the call sign "Casper", since its pilot Ken Mattingly thought, "there are enough serious things in this flight, so I picked a non-serious name."

== Creation ==
The origins of Casper are disputed, with both Seymour Reit and Joe Oriolo claiming to be the character's creator. According to Oriolo, Casper was created on a Halloween night to assuage his four-year-old daughter Joan's fear of the dark. He made a cardboard cutout of a friendly ghost and hung it in the backyard tree to show her that not all ghosts are bad.

Though Joan has corroborated this story, Seymour Reit maintains that Casper was born with a short story which he conceived and wrote entirely by himself and gave to Oriolo to illustrate. Reit concluded, "Joe [Oriolo] created the actual cartoon of the character - but the concept, series, idea and plotline were mine, prior to Joe's involvement. Joe played an important part, but I was Casper's legit 'Poppa'." [emphasis in original]

Reit and Oriolo intended to sell the story to either Fleischer Studios (where they were both employed as animators) or to a children's storybook publisher, and they eventually lined up a deal with Grosset & Dunlap. When Reit was away on military service during World War II before the book was released, Oriolo sold the rights to the book to Paramount Pictures' Famous Studios, Fleischer Studios' successor, for a total of $175. This one-time payment was all that he received, missing out on a share of the revenue earned from the films, comic books and merchandise to come. For his part, Reit received no payment for the book at all.

In the original Famous cartoons, Casper is standing next to a grave inscribed with "Casper", indicating him to be deceased. Originally, stories have shown that his visibility is due to wearing a sheet. In the Casper live-action film, this is not shown and it is implied that he is naturally visible to humans as a white creature.

== Appearances ==
=== Theatrical appearances ===
The Friendly Ghost, Casper's first appearance.

The Friendly Ghost, the first Noveltoons short to feature Casper, was released by Paramount in May 1945 with a few differences from the book. In the cartoon adaptation, Casper is a cute ghost-child with a New York accent who inhabits a haunted house along with a community of adult ghosts who delight in scaring the living. Casper, in contrast, would prefer to make friends with people. He packs up his belongings and goes out into the world, hoping to find friends. However, the animals that he meets (a rooster, a mole, a cat, a mouse named Herman, and a group of hens) take one horrified look at him, scream: "A ghost!" and run off in the other direction. Distraught, Casper attempts suicide (apparently forgetting that he is already dead) by lying down on a railway track before an oncoming train, before he meets two children named Bonnie and Johnny who become his friends. The children's mother, apparently widowed and impoverished, is frightened of Casper. She later welcomes him into the family after he unintentionally frightens off a greedy landlord, who, unwilling to own a "haunted" house, tears up the mortgage and gives her the house outright. The short ends with the mother kissing Bonnie, Johnny, and Casper as she sends them off to school, with Casper wearing clothing as if he were a living child.

Casper appeared in two more Noveltoons shorts, There's Good Boos To-Night and A Haunting We Will Go, released in 1948 and 1949 respectively, even though Famous Studios's president and general manager Sam Buchwald had already given approval for Casper to have his own series. In these cartoons Casper's appearance was cuter and more infantile than in his debut cartoon; head animator Myron Waldman has claimed credit for the redesign. There's Good Boos To-Night differs wildly from later Casper cartoons: although the theme of Casper trying to find a friend and failing in these attempts before succeeding also occurs in later cartoons, the tone of this short turns remarkably dark when a hunter and his dogs appear, chasing the little fox cub named Ferdie that Casper has befriended. Although Casper scares the hunter and dogs away, Casper discovers Ferdie dead after a harrowing chase scene. Ferdie returns as a ghost to join his friend Casper in the afterlife.

These three cartoons were initially billed as Noveltoon shorts before Paramount started the official Casper the Friendly Ghost series in 1950, which ran until 1959. Most of the entries in the series were relatively the same: Casper (now slightly thinner than the pudgy figure that appeared in the earlier cartoons) escapes from the afterlife of a regular ghost because he finds that scaring people can be tiresome year after year, tries to find friends but inadvertently scares almost everyone, and finally finds a (cute little) friend, whom he saves from some sort of fate, leading to his acceptance by those initially scared of him. Animation historian Leonard Maltin, in his book Of Mice and Magic, criticized the series for its reliance on repetition, saying that Casper was "the most monotonous character to invade cartoonland since Mighty Mouse. It seemed as it every Casper cartoon followed the same story line, with only minor variations." One of the animators, Lee Mishkin, similarly complained, "With the Casper series, you never knew what picture you were working on because they were all exactly the same."

=== Harvey Comics ===
Cover of Casper the Friendly Ghost #1 (March 1991)

Casper was first published in comics form in August 1949 by St. John Publications, running for five issues until September 1951. In 1952, Alfred Harvey, founder and publisher of Harvey Comics began producing Casper comic books. Casper appeared in Harvey Comics Hits #61 (Oct 1952), and then moved to a solo book with Casper the Friendly Ghost #7 (December 1952), picking up the numbering from the St. John Publications series. The series was written and edited by Sid Jacobson and drawn by Warren Kremer, who broke from the formula established in the cartoons by redesigning Casper to have feet, avoiding undue emphasis on the fact that Casper was a dead child, giving Casper a supporting cast of friends, and creating stories in which Casper used his powers to do good. In 1959, Harvey purchased the rights to the character outright alongside other Famous Studios properties.

Casper went on to headline a large number of comic book series, as well as appearing in back up stories and guest appearances in other titles. Many of the characters introduced in the comic book series went on to appear in the Casper cartoons. The Casper series inspired three popular spin-offs: Spooky the Tuff Little Ghost, Wendy the Good Little Witch, and The Ghostly Trio. Casper's titles include:

- Casper
- Casper Adventure Digest
- Casper and...
- Casper and Friends
- Casper and Friends Magazine
- Casper and Nightmare
- Casper and Spooky
- Casper and The Ghostly Trio
- Casper: A Spirited Beginning (film adaptation)
- Casper Big Book
- Casper Digest
- Casper Digest Stories
- Casper Digest Winners
- Casper Enchanted Tales Digest
- Casper Ghostland
- Casper Giant Size
- Casper Halloween Trick or Treat
- Casper in Space
- Casper in 3-D
- Casper Magazine
- Casper Movie Adaptation
- Casper Space Ship
- Casper's Ghostland
- Casper's Scare School
- Casper's Haunted Christmas
- Casper Special
- Casper Strange Ghost Stories
- Casper, the Friendly Ghost
- Casper TV Showtime
- Famous TV Funday Funnies
- The Friendly Ghost, Casper
- Harvey Two-Pack
- Nightmare and Casper
- Richie Rich and Casper
- Richie Rich, Casper, and Wendy
- TV Casper and Company
- Casper and the Spectrals

In 2009, a new Casper comic was published, called Casper and the Spectrals by Arden Entertainment. Much like The Man of Steel and Batman: Year One did with their respective characters, it revamped Casper and several other Harvey characters for a new audience. After selling 6,400 copies of the first comic, the last two issues were published in 2010. Comic book publisher American Mythology picked up the Casper the Friendly Ghost title, and has also published Casper & Wendy and Casper & Hot Stuff.

=== Television ===
Casper has starred in five television shows:

- Matty's Funday Funnies (1959–1961)
- The New Casper Cartoon Show (1963–1970)
- Casper and the Angels (1979)
- The Harveytoons Show (known in the UK as Casper and Friends) (1990–1994)
- The Spooktacular New Adventures of Casper (1996–1998)
- Casper's Scare School (2009–2012)

After Harvey bought the rights to Casper and many other Famous properties in 1959 (including Herman and Katnip, Little Audrey, and Baby Huey), they began broadcasting the post-September 1950 theatrical Famous shorts on a television show sponsored by Mattel Toys titled Matty's Funday Funnies on ABC in 1959 which introduced the Barbie doll to the public. The other Famous produced Casper cartoons had already been acquired by television distributor U.M. & M. TV Corporation in 1956. U.M. & M. retitled just "A Haunting We Will Go", but credited "Featuring Casper The Friendly Ghost" as "Featuring Casper's Friendly Ghost".

New cartoons were created for The New Casper Cartoon Show in 1963, also on ABC. The original Casper cartoons were syndicated under the title Harveytoons (initially repackaged as Casper and Company) in 1963 and ran continuously until the mid-90s. Casper has remained popular in reruns and merchandising.

Hanna-Barbera Productions also gave Casper two holiday specials, Casper's First Christmas (which also starred Yogi Bear, Huckleberry Hound, Snagglepuss, Quick Draw McGraw, Augie Doggie and Doggie Daddy) and Casper's Halloween Special (aka Casper Saves Halloween), and also the Saturday morning cartoon series Casper and the Angels (an animated takeoff on two live-action hit shows Charlie's Angels and CHiPS) in the autumn of 1979, all on NBC. Also featured on the NBC version was a big ghost named Hairy Scary (voiced by John Stephenson). None of Casper's original co-stars appeared in the show.

Between 1990 and 1994, Casper appeared in The Harveytoons Show which was known as Casper and Friends in the UK. This show featured other Harvey Comics characters and series including: Little Audrey, Tommy Tortoise and Moe Hare, Baby Huey, Herman and Katnip, Buzzy the Crow, Modern Madcaps, Possum Pearl, Professor Schmatlz, Jeeper and Creeper and others. The show consisted of Famous Studios-produced cartoons from 1950 to 1964 and each episode of the series included three full cartoons and one "ToonTake" segment.

In 1996, Amblin Entertainment and Universal Cartoon Studios created a new Casper series for Fox Kids called The Spooktacular New Adventures of Casper, based on the 1995 feature, that lasted two years and was never seen on television again after 1998.

In 2009, MoonScoop Group, in association with Classic Media, TF1 and DQ, produced a TV show named Casper's Scare School, based on the film of the same name.

In 2020, Casper appeared in a supporting role in the "Scare Bud" episode of Harvey Girls Forever!, a series based on Harvey Comics characters.

A new live-action television series was announced to be in development at Peacock in 2022, co-produced between Universal Content Productions (now Universal Global Television) and DreamWorks Animation with Wu Kai-yu writing and executive producing. The series ultimately did not move forward. Instead a new series, inspired by Netflix's Wednesday, was announced for Disney+ in 2026, and set to be executive produced by Steven Spielberg, Rob Letterman, and Hilary Winston.

Casper can be seen on Casper and Company on MeTV Toons weekdays.

=== Films ===
The Famous Studios version of Casper was one of many characters considered to appear in the 1988 film Who Framed Roger Rabbit. Casper would have appeared at Marvin Acme's funeral, rising from Acme's grave as his coffin is lowered, scaring away the mourners. The funeral scene was storyboarded but cut before being animated.

Numerous Casper cartoons were released on home video by Universal Studios (via MCA Inc.), which also adopted the friendly ghost into a live-action feature film titled Casper in 1995, where he and his wicked uncles, the Ghostly Trio, were rendered via computer animation, which initially created the first CGI lead character in a film. The film constructed a back-story for the character and is the only time in the series that the question of his death has been addressed. According to the film, Casper was a twelve-year-old boy living in Whipstaff Manor with his inventor father J.T. McFadden until he died from pneumonia after playing out in the cold until it was past nightfall. Two live-action direct-to-video follow-ups to the film, Casper: A Spirited Beginning and Casper Meets Wendy (which introduced Hilary Duff as fellow Harvey Comics character Wendy the Good Little Witch), were made. They were followed by Casper's Haunted Christmas (starring Spooky and Poil from the comics), and Casper's Scare School, which were done entirely in CGI with no live-action elements.

In 2001, Harvey Entertainment was acquired by Classic Media which, until 2012, licensed the Harvey properties including Casper.

Casper made a cameo in a MetLife commercial along with several other cartoon characters in 2012. Later that same year, Classic Media was acquired by DreamWorks Animation. In 2013, DreamWorks Animation announced that they were developing a computer-animated reboot film based on the Harvey Comics character of the same name. Simon Wells, who at one point was previously attached to write and direct the unproduced sequel to the live-action film, was attached to write and direct this adaptation, with writing duo John Altschuler and Dave Krinsky (King of the Hill, Blades of Glory) to co-write the film's script along with. It was set to be DreamWorks' second attempt at an animated film based on characters from the Classic Media library following Mr. Peabody & Sherman, but nothing came of it since its announcement. Concept art for an unproduced film was posted by animator Danny Williams in December 2023, stating that the pitch "never went anywhere". Two years afterwards, the Casper character and any and all of Harvey Comics characters would be acquired by NBCUniversal in 2016, and thus Universal Pictures, the producer of the original live-action feature film, now manages the rights to the character and other related characters in addition to regaining the rights to Casper's Haunted Christmas (which Universal itself originally released in late 2000). However, Casper Meets Wendy is currently owned by The Walt Disney Company through BVS Entertainment and 20th Television.

In 2019, Casper made an appearance in a GEICO commercial.

== Actors who have voiced or portrayed Casper ==
- Cecil Roy, Alan Shay, Gwen Davies, and Norma MacMillan voiced Casper in the majority of the Famous Studios cartoons.
- Anne Lloyd provided the voice in Golden Records' Casper the Friendly Ghost and The Little Ghost's Dance in 1951.
- June Foray provided the voice for Mattel's Talking Casper the Friendly Ghost Doll in 1961.
- Mae Questel provided the voice in Casper the Friendly Ghost and Little Audrey Says.
- Norma MacMillan provided the voice in The New Casper Cartoon Show.
- Julie McWhirter provided the voice in Casper and the Angels, Casper's Halloween Special and Casper's First Christmas.
- Christopher Miron Allport provided the voice in an early 1990s Target commercial.
- Malachi Pearson voiced the character in the 1995 film Casper and The Spooktacular New Adventures of Casper (1996–1998).
- Joanna Ruiz provided the voice for a British dub of the 1995 film.
- Devon Sawa is the only actor to ever have played the character in live-action, portraying him in a sequence from the 1995 film in which Casper was temporarily brought back to life.
- April Winchell voiced Casper as a baby in The Spooktacular New Adventures of Casper episode "Three Ghosts and a Baby".
- Lani Minella voiced Casper in Casper: The Interactive Adventure.
- Jeremy Foley voiced the character in Casper: A Spirited Beginning and Casper Meets Wendy.
- Siobhan Moore and Paul Tiesler played Casper in Casper: The Musical.
- Brendon Ryan Barrett provided the voice in Casper's Haunted Christmas.
- Devon Werkheiser voiced Casper in Casper's Scare School.
- Robbie Sublett and Matthew Géczy voices Casper in Casper's Scare School.
- Carolyn Hennesy voiced Casper in Casper: Friends Around the World and Casper: Spirit Dimensions
- Oliver Stern voiced Casper in a GEICO commercial in 2019.
- Jack Theodore Kruse played Casper in Casper the Friendly Musical.
- Bobby Moynihan voiced Casper in the fourth season of Harvey Girls Forever!

== Friends/supporting characters ==
- Johnny and Bonnie ("The Friendly Ghost")
- Ferdie Fox ("There's Good Boo's Tonight")
- Dudley Duck ("A Haunting We Will Go")
- Wheezy the Elephant ("Spooking About Africa")
- Moon People ("Boo Moon")
- Wendy the Good Little Witch
- Ghostly Trio (Casper's uncles): Stretch, Fatso and Stinkie
- The Witch Sisters (Wendy's aunties): Thelma, Velma and Zelma (sometimes)
- Archibald the Talking Wishing Well
- Hot Stuff the Little Devil
- Nightmare the Ghost Horse
- Spooky the Tuff Little Ghost
- Poil The Ghost, Spooky's Girlfriend
- Gned Gnome
- Gnewton Gnome
- Gnorman Gnome
- Sohini
- Arruda
- Richie Rich (occasionally)
- Little Audrey
- Little Dot (Harvey Girls Forever!)
- Little Lotta (Harvey Girls Forever!)
- Hairy Scary (Casper and the Angels, Casper's Halloween Special and Casper's First Christmas)
- Mini and Maxi (Casper and the Angels)
- Nerdly and Fungo (Casper and the Angels)
- The Commander (Casper and the Angels)
- Yogi Bear (Casper's First Christmas)
- Boo-Boo Bear (Casper's First Christmas)
- Santa Claus (Casper's First Christmas)
- Huckleberry Hound (Casper's First Christmas)
- Snagglepuss (Casper's First Christmas)
- Quick-Draw McGraw (Casper's First Christmas)
- Augie Doggie and Doggie Daddy (Casper's First Christmas)
- Kat Harvey (Casper and The Spooktacular New Adventures of Casper)
- Dr. James Harvey (Casper and The Spooktacular New Adventures of Casper)
- Amelia Harvey (Casper)
- Chris Carson (Casper: A Spirited Beginning)
- Tim Carson (Casper: A Spirited Beginning)
- Sheila Fistergraff (Casper: A Spirited Beginning)
- Jennifer (Casper: A Spirited Beginning)
- The Oracle in the Mirror (Casper Meets Wendy)
- Holly Jollimore (Casper's Haunted Christmas)
- Jimmy Bradley (Casper's Scare School (film) and Casper's Scare School (TV series))
- Ra (Casper's Scare School (film), Casper's Scare School (video game), Casper's Scare School (TV series) and Casper's Scare School (comics))
- Mantha the Zombie (Casper's Scare School (film), Casper's Scare School (video game), Casper's Scare School (TV series) and Casper's Scare School (comics))
- Professor Phinieas Field (Casper and the Spectrals)
- Eloise "Ellie" Essex (Casper and the Spectrals)
- Hot Stuff's family (nameless parents and brother, Casper and the Spectrals)

== Enemies ==
- Unnamed Greedy Landlord ("The Friendly Ghost")
- An unnamed fox and duck hunter and his two hunting dogs ("There's Good Boo's Tonight" and "A Haunting We Will Go")
- Tree Men Army ("Boo Moon")
- Winifred The Witch (Casper's Halloween Special)
- Screech The Ghost (Casper's Halloween Special)
- Big Bad Wolf aka Wolfie (original arch-enemy, Once Upon a Rhyme,Spunky Skunky,Pig a Boo,By the Old Mill Scream & Little Boo Peep)
- Kibosh The Ghost (Arch-enemy. Kibosh is the powerful, evil and feared king of ghosts. Casper: A Spirited Beginning, Casper: Activity Center, Casper's Haunted Christmas, Casper: Friends Around the World, Casper: Spirit Dimensions, Casper's Scare School (film), Casper's Scare School (TV series) and Casper's Scare School: Classroom Capers)
- Snivel The Ghost (Casper: A Spirited Beginning, Casper: Activity Center and Casper's Haunted Christmas)
- The Wizard (Casper: Spirit Dimensions)
- Four Dragons (Casper: Spirit Dimensions)
- Krank (Casper: Spirit Dimensions)
- Doctor Deranged (Casper: Spirit Dimensions)
- Captain Pegleg Potbelly (Casper: Spirit Dimensions)
- Ghostly Trio (Casper's uncles): Stretch, Fatso and Stinkie (sometimes)
- The Witch Sisters (Wendy's aunties): Thelma, Velma and Zelma (sometimes)
- Catherine "Carrigan" Crittenden (Casper)
- Paul "Dibs" Plutzker (Casper)
- Bill Case (Casper: A Spirited Beginning)
- Brock Lee (Casper: A Spirited Beginning)
- Danny (Casper: A Spirited Beginning)
- Leon (Casper: A Spirited Beginning)
- Jennifer (Casper: A Spirited Beginning) (sometimes)
- Desmond Spellman (Casper Meets Wendy)
- Vincent and Jules (Casper Meets Wendy)
- Josh Jackman and his unnamed friend (Casper Meets Wendy)
- Alder and Dash (Casper's Scare School (film) and Casper's Scare School (TV series))
- Thatch (Casper's Scare School (film), Casper's Scare School (video game), Casper's Scare School (TV series) and Casper's Scare School (comics))
- Volbragg (Casper and the Spectrals)

== Home media ==
In 2011, Shout! Factory released a DVD set titled Casper The Friendly Ghost: The Complete Collection 1945-1963 which contains The Friendly Ghost, There's Good Boos To-Night, A Haunting We Will Go, 55 theatrical cartoons, and all 26 episodes of The New Casper Cartoon Show.

== Video games ==
=== Casper ===
Several video games were based on the 1995 film for PC, Super Nintendo Entertainment System, Game Boy, Sega Saturn, 3DO, PlayStation, and Game Boy Color. In subsequent years Windows 95 and Game Boy Advance games were released serving as sequels to the film.

=== Casper: A Spirited Beginning Activity Center ===
Developed by Sound Source Interactive, published by WayForward Technologies and released in 1998 for PC, it is based on the film of the same name and is similar in format to Disney's Activity Center. Set at Ghost Central Station, the player earns Casper coins by completing Casper's Spinning Squares, Stretch's Memory Game, Fatso's Kitchen, Stinkie's Goo Toss and Snivel's Mix & Match. The player must collect at least 15 Casper coins from these five games to unlock Kibosh's Magic Puzzle.

=== Casper: Friends Around the World ===
Reception

Review scores
Publication	Score
AllGame	2.5/5
PlayStation Official Magazine – UK	4/10

Developed by Realtime Associates, published by Sound Source Interactive in the United States and TDK Mediactive in Europe, this game was released in 2000 on PlayStation. It is a mostly 2D side-scrolling platform game with occasional forward and backward movements. The evil Kibosh has invented a device to send Casper's human friends to a place where they "would not have a ghost of a chance of being found" and has hypnotized the Ghostly Trio into doing his bidding. However Casper finds a page from a map of Hollywood giving him a clue on where to start his quest to find his friends and the three missing pieces for Kibosh's imprisoning device to get them back home safely. The game is played across ten levels set around the world with 40 friendship crystals on each level to collect in order to advance to the bonus level at the end.

=== Casper: Spirit Dimensions ===
Developed by Lucky Chicken Games and published by TDK Mediactive, it was the first 3D game, to have a movable game camera, based on Casper. It was released in 2001 for PlayStation 2 and in 2002 for GameCube. The evil Kibosh has taken over the Spirit World and is intent on also taking over the mortal world. Meanwhile, Wendy the Good Little Witch summons Casper, the only remaining free ghost, and opens the portals to the Spirit Dimensions to help in their only chance to defeat Kibosh.

=== Casper and the Ghostly Trio ===
Developed by Data Design Interactive and published by Blast! Entertainment, it was released in 2007 on PlayStation 2. It is a 3D game in which Casper has legs and is affected by gravity though he can glide, unlike his flying ability in Spirit Dimensions. The Ghostly Trio have kidnapped Wendy the Good Little Witch in an attempt to use her magic to create a potion that would give them the power to rule Ghostland. Wendy manages to use her magic to get the message across to Casper who must find his way through six levels to rescue her. At the end of the first five levels is a bonus stage in which Casper must collect as many jewels as he can while avoiding the Trio's lightning which is chasing him.

=== Casper's Scare School ===
Developed by Data Design Interactive for PlayStation 2 and Nikitova Games for the Nintendo DS, it is based on the animated film and TV series of the same name released in 2008 and 2009.

=== Casper's Scare School: Spooky Sports Day ===
Developed in 2009 by The Code Monkeys for Wii, Nintendo DS and iOS.

== Copyright status ==
As a result of a lawsuit between Harvey and Columbia Pictures in 1984, a court determined that a lapsed copyright had allowed Fatso, Casper's brother/uncle, to enter the public domain. Former Disney researcher Gregory S. Brown later discovered that Harvey had failed to renew other copyrights covering the company's ghosts, including Casper.

== See also ==
- Ghost stories
- Homer the Happy Ghost
- Timmy the Timid Ghost
- List of ghosts
- Medjed
