= Jim Ward (voice actor) =

American voice actor (1959–2025)

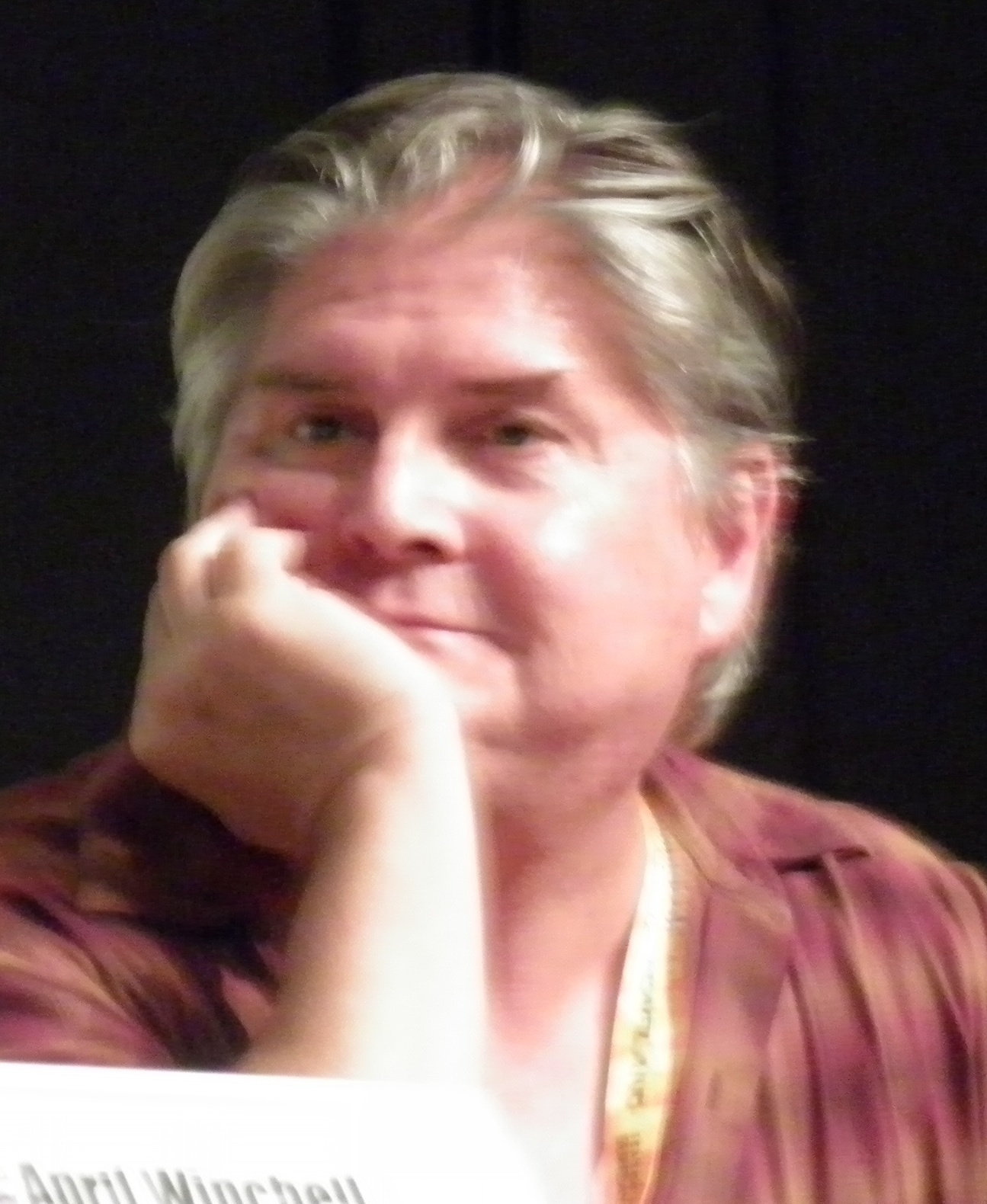
- Ward in 2012
- Born: James Kevin Ward; May 19, 1959; San Francisco, California, U.S.
- Died: December 10, 2025 (aged 66); Los Angeles, California, U.S.
- Occupations: Voice actor; radio personality
- Years active: 1976–2021
- Agent(s): Arlene Thornton and Associates
- Spouse: Janice Ward (m. 2009)
- Father: Donald J. Ward
- Awards: Daytime Emmy Awards; 2009 – Outstanding Performer in an Animated Program; Biker Mice from Mars

James Kevin Ward (May 19, 1959 – December 10, 2025) was an American voice actor and radio personality. He was best known for his roles as Doug Dimmadome and Chet Ubetcha in The Fairly OddParents (2001–2017), Captain Qwark in the Ratchet & Clank franchise (2002–2021), and XLR8, Diamondhead, and Wildvine in Ben 10 (2005–2008), as well as portraying Jack Krauser in Resident Evil 4 (2005). In radio, he was best known for his tenure on The Stephanie Miller Show (2004–2017).

== Life and career ==
James Kevin Ward was born in San Francisco on May 19, 1959, and grew up in Los Angeles. He was the son of Donald J. Ward, a folklorist and German professor at the University of California, Los Angeles. After college, Ward worked as a tour guide at Universal Studios Hollywood.

=== Voiceover career ===
Ward began acting in 1976 with a minor role in the Western television series How the West Was Won. His first voice acting break in 1993 came with the role of Spider-Man in the updated Sega CD video game The Amazing Spider-Man vs. The Kingpin.

He went on to play several roles in animation and video games, most notably Captain Qwark in the Ratchet & Clank franchise, and several voices in The Fairly OddParents and Ben 10. In 2006, Ward played Eyemore in Biker Mice from Mars, a remake of the 1990s series of the same name. In 2009, for his roles on the show, he was nominated and won the Daytime Emmy Award for Outstanding Performer in an Animated Program.

=== Radio career ===
From 2004 to 2017, Ward was the co-host of The Stephanie Miller Show, a syndicated progressive talk radio program that featured a number of his impersonations of political figures, other celebrities, and news makers.

== Personal life and death ==
Ward met his wife, Janice, on a cruise to Mexico in 2000, and they married in 2009.

Ward was diagnosed with Alzheimer's disease in 2017 and retired from his role on The Stephanie Miller Show. In 2021, it was reported that Ward's Alzheimer's, along with a severe infection of COVID-19, had progressed to the point that he was unable to continue voice acting.

Ward died at the Silverado Beverly Place Memory Care in Los Angeles on December 10, 2025, after an eight-year battle with Alzheimer's. His death was announced on social media by Stephanie Miller, who aired a tribute to Ward the following day. He was 66.

== Filmography ==
=== Television ===
Year	Title	Role	Notes
1984	Diff'rent Strokes	"KITT" (voice)	Episode: "Hooray for Hollywood". Uncredited. In the Knight Rider series, KITT was voiced by William Daniels
1989	The Super Mario Bros. Super Show!	Patty's dad, Count Dracula, Dr. Frankenstein	
1997–1999	Smart Guy	Vice Principal Basil Militich	Note: Credited as James K. Ward
2013	The Haunted Hathaways	Wags	Episode: "Haunted Dog"

=== Animation ===
Year	Title	Role	Notes
1998–1999	The Secret Files of the Spy Dogs	Angus	
1999–2000	Dilbert	Loud Howard	
2000	King of the Hill	George W. Bush	Episode: "The Perils of Polling"
2000–2002	Hard Drinkin' Lincoln	Abraham Lincoln	Macromedia Flash cartoon on Icebox.com
2001–2004	Totally Spies!	Sebastian, Security Guard, Worker #1, Man	4 episodes
2001–2017	The Fairly OddParents	Doug Dimmadome, Chet Ubetcha, Mr. Bickles, Dif, Pa Speevak, various voices	95 episodes
2002	Hey Arnold!	Announcer	Episode: "Rich Guy"
2003	Time Squad	Paul Revere	Episode: "Horse of Horrors"
2004–2006	Danny Phantom	Bertrand, Drive-Through Speaker Box, Walla, Guard, Hobson, Operative L	6 episodes
2004	Tripping the Rift	Devil	Episode: "The Devil and a Guy Named Webster"
2005–2009	My Life as a Teenage Robot	Various voices	9 episodes
2005–2008	Ben 10	Diamondhead, XLR8, Wildvine, various voices	32 episodes
2006	Catscratch	Champsley	2 episodes
2006–2007	Biker Mice from Mars	Stoker / Night Shift, Dr. Catorkian, Eyemore, Crusher	7 episodes
2007	Avatar: The Last Airbender	Headmaster	Episode: "The Headband"
2008	Legion of Super Heroes	Mordru	Episode: "Trials"
2008	Wolverine and the X-Men	Professor X, Sentinels, Warren Worthington II, Abraham Cornelius, Rover	20 episodes
2009	Back at the Barnyard	Judge	Episode: "Cowdyshack"
2009	The Super Hero Squad Show	Professor X	Episode: "Mysterious Mayhem at Mutant High!"
2010–2012	The Avengers: Earth's Mightiest Heroes	Baron Strucker, Henry Peter Gyrich, Damocles AI, Chrell, additional voices	7 episodes
2012	Kung Fu Panda: Legends of Awesomeness	Kwan	Episode: "Has-Been Hero"
2015	We Bare Bears	Theater Manager	Episode: "Shush Ninjas"
2016	Justice League Action	Brain	Episode: "The Brain Buster"
2016–2017	New Looney Tunes	Squint Eatswood	4 episodes

=== Film ===
Year	Title	Role	Notes
1989	Cheetah	Announcer	
1997	Casper: A Spirited Beginning	Stretch	
1998	Casper Meets Wendy	Stretch	
2001	Spirited Away	River Spirit	English dub
2003	The Wacky Adventures of Ronald McDonald: The Monsters of O'McDonaldland Loch	Scotty	Direct-to-video
2004	The Fairly OddParents: Channel Chasers	Doug Dimmadome, Chet Ubetcha, Mr. Joel, Blackbird	Television film
2004	Kangaroo Jack: G'Day U.S.A.!	Outback Ollie	
2004–2006	Jimmy Timmy Power Hour	Chet Ubetcha, Tour Guide, Anti Fairy #2	Television film
2005	School's Out! The Musical	Flunky	Television film
2006	Ultimate Avengers	Herr Kleiser	Direct-to-video
2006	Cars	Additional voices	
2006	The Fairly OddParents: Fairy Idol	Chet Ubetcha, Lawn Gnome, Fairy Bouncer	Television film
2006	Ultimate Avengers 2	Herr Kleiser	Direct-to-video
2007	Ben 10: Secret of the Omnitrix	XLR8, Piscciss Volann Prisoner	Television film
2008	WALL-E	Billboard Announcer	
2010	Superman/Batman: Apocalypse	Radio DJ	Direct-to-video
2010	Kung Fu Magoo	General Bonkopp, Radio Voice, Movie Announcer	Television film
2011	Small Fry	Franklin	Direct-to-video
2012	Ben 10: Destroy All Aliens	Diamondhead	Television film
2012	Batman: The Dark Knight Returns	Femur's Lawyer	Direct-to-video
2013	Despicable Me 2	Additional voices	
2013	Escape from Planet Earth	Grey #1	
2015	Inside Out	Additional voices	
2016	Ratchet & Clank	Captain Qwark	
2016	Batman: Return of the Caped Crusaders	Commissioner Gordon	Direct-to-video
2017	Tom and Jerry: Willy Wonka and the Chocolate Factory	Anchorman, German Reporter	Direct-to-video
2017	Top Cat Begins	Stage Manager, Driver	
2017	Batman vs. Two-Face	Commissioner Gordon	Direct-to-video
2020	Superman: Red Son	George Taylor	Direct-to-video
2021	Ratchet & Clank: Life of Pie	Captain Qwark	

=== Video games ===
Year	Title	Role	Notes
1993	The Amazing Spider-Man vs. The Kingpin	Peter Parker/Spider-Man, Eddie Brock/Venom	
1998	Grim Fandango	Hector LeMans, Gunnar, Doug	
1998	King's Quest: Mask of Eternity	Armor Seller Gnome, Hillman, Unseen Voice	
1999	Star Wars Episode I: Racer	Fud Sang, Mars Guo	
1999	Star Wars: Episode I – The Phantom Menace	Gungan Jailer	
2000	Escape from Monkey Island	Drunken Man, Tony the Catapult Operator	
2001	Star Wars: Starfighter	Pirate Ground Control, Wingman	
2001	Arcanum: Of Steamworks and Magick Obscura	Arronax, Gar, Joachim, Nasrudin	
2002	Ratchet & Clank	Captain Qwark, Qwark Bot, Gadgetron CEO, Deserter	
2002	Star Wars Racer Revenge	Scorch Zanales	
2002	Star Wars: Bounty Hunter	Meeko Ghintee	
2003	Indiana Jones and the Emperor's Tomb	Soldier	
2003	Crimson Skies: High Road to Revenge	Dr. Hancock, Cop	
2003	The Hobbit	Gandalf	
2003	Call of Duty	German PA Officer	
2003	Bionicle	Pohatu Nuva	
2003	SOCOM II U.S. Navy SEALs	Russian Spetznaz Operative Polaris	
2003	Ratchet & Clank: Going Commando	Captain Qwark, Abercrombie Fizzwidget	
2004	Vampire: The Masquerade – Bloodlines	Additional voices	
2004	Painkiller	Asmodeus	
2004	The Fairly OddParents: Shadow Showdown	Chet Ubetcha	
2004	Ratchet & Clank: Up Your Arsenal	Captain Qwark, Skrunch, Host, Scorpio, Thyrannoid	
2004	Call of Duty: United Offensive	Corporal Kukilov, German Officer, German Soldier	
2004	Metal Gear Solid 3: Snake Eater	Aleksandr Granin	
2005	Resident Evil 4	Jack Krauser	
2005	Destroy All Humans!	Bert Whither, Mayor, Power Suit Soldier	
2005	Killer7	Toru Fukushima	
2005	Evil Dead: Regeneration	Dr. Reinhard, Professor Knowby	
2005	F.E.A.R.	Commissioner Betters	
2005	Kingdom of Paradise	Genra	
2005	X-Men Legends II: Rise of Apocalypse	Colossus, Guardian	
2005	Ratchet: Deadlocked	Captain Qwark, Shellshock	
2005	The Outfit	Axis Troops	
2006	Scooby-Doo! Who's Watching Who?	Stuart Weatherby, Mr. Jenkins, C. L. Magnus, Spooky Space Kook, Scare Pair, Phantom Shadows	
2006	SpongeBob SquarePants: Creature from the Krusty Krab	Miscellaneous Voices	
2007	Ratchet & Clank: Size Matters	Captain Qwark, Otto Destruct	
2007	Tomb Raider: Anniversary	Pierre DuPont	
2007	Ratchet & Clank Future: Tools of Destruction	Captain Qwark	
2007	Nicktoons: Attack of the Toybots	ChadBot, Game Show Host	
2007	Ben 10: Protector of Earth	XLR8, Wildvine	
2007	Age of Empires III: The Asian Dynasties	Tokugawa Ieyasu	
2008	Destroy All Humans! Big Willy Unleashed	Mr. Pork, Gondil	
2008	Iron Man	A.I.M. Soldier	
2008	Mercenaries 2: World In Flames	Ramon Solano	
2008	Defense Grid: The Awakening	Fletcher	
2009	Eat Lead: The Return of Matt Hazard	Sting Sniperscope, Secret Wafferthin Soldier, Suited Employee	
2009	MadWorld	Agent XIII	
2009	Brütal Legend	Roadies, Druids	
2009	Ratchet & Clank Future: A Crack in Time	Captain Qwark	
2009	Call of Duty: Modern Warfare 2	Ranger, Shadow Company Soldier	
2009	Wolfenstein	Scribe	
2009	Resident Evil: The Darkside Chronicles	Jack Krauser	
2009	The Saboteur	Vittore Morini	
2010	White Knight Chronicles	Sarvain	
2010	Lost Planet 2	Various voices	
2010	BioShock 2	Suresh	
2010	Resonance of Fate	Cardinal Rowen	
2010	Clash of the Titans	Phaedrus, Kucuk, Soldiers	
2010	Ninety-Nine Nights II	Zirrick	
2010	Fallout: New Vegas	Dr. Klein, Main Computer, Prototype Auto-Doc	
2011	Dragon Age II	Orsino	
2011	Guild Wars 2	Tybalt Leftpaw	
2011	Rise of Nightmares	Peter	
2011	White Knight Chronicles II	Ledom	
2011	Ratchet & Clank: All 4 One	Captain Qwark, Commander Spog	
2011	Ultimate Marvel vs. Capcom 3	Sentinels	
2012	Diablo III	Belial	
2012	Transformers: Fall of Cybertron	Perceptor	
2012	PlayStation All-Stars Battle Royale	Captain Qwark, Soldier	
2012	Ratchet & Clank: Full Frontal Assault	Captain Qwark	
2013	Metal Gear Rising: Revengeance	Herr Doktor / Wilhelm Voigt	
2013	Starcraft II: Heart of the Swarm	Brakk	
2013	Marvel Heroes	Professor X	
2013	Dota 2	Defense Grid Announcer	
2013	Ratchet & Clank: Into the Nexus	Captain Qwark	
2014	Diablo III: Reaper of Souls	Belial	
2014	The Elder Scrolls Online	Mannimarco, additional voices	
2014	Transformers: Rise of the Dark Spark	Perceptor	
2014	Defense Grid 2	Fletcher	
2015	Transformers: Devastation	Teletraan-1, Teletraan Alpha, Ground Soldiers	
2015	Batman: Arkham Knight	Firefighter Adamson, Officer Williams, Sergeant McAllister	
2015	Fallout 4	RobCo Battlezone Announcer, Old Longfellow	
2016	Ratchet & Clank	Captain Qwark, Qwark Bot, Hoverboarder, Warbot, Blarg	
2018	Red Dead Redemption 2	The Local Pedestrian Population	
2019	Marvel Ultimate Alliance 3: The Black Order	Additional voices	
2022	Quake Champions	Ranger	Final role
