= The Harvey Entertainment Company =

Animation production arm of comic book publisher Harvey Comics

- Formerly: Harvey Films (1957–1989); Harvey Comics Entertainment (1989–1994); The Harvey Entertainment Company (1994–2001); Sunland Entertainment Co. (2001–2003)
- Founded: 1957; 69 years ago
- Defunct: 2003; 23 years ago
- Fate: Liquidation, assets sold to Classic Media (now known as DreamWorks Classics)
- Successor: Harvey Entertainment, Inc. (DreamWorks Classics)
- Headquarters: Santa Monica, California, United States
- Products: Casper the Friendly Ghost; The Ghostly Trio; Richie Rich; Baby Huey; Little Dot; Little Audrey; Little Lotta; Wendy the Good Little Witch; Hot Stuff the Little Devil
- Website: Harvey Entertainment at the Wayback Machine (archived April 3, 2005)

The Harvey Entertainment Company (formerly known as Harvey Films and Harvey Entertainment, or simply Harvey, and later named Sunland Entertainment Co.) was the production arm of comic book publisher Harvey Comics. It was founded in 1957.

A majority of the company's assets were purchased by Classic Media (currently owned by Comcast's owned NBCUniversal via DreamWorks Animation) in 2001 under the in-name subsidiary Harvey Entertainment, Inc., while some remains of the business including the live-action film division were folded within Echo Bridge Entertainment. Today, Harvey Entertainment exists as branding recognition and a copyright holder for the Harvey properties.

== History ==
=== Early history ===
The company was formed in 1957 as an entertainment spin-off of its comic book incarnation. At the time, it still had ties with Paramount's in-house cartoon studio, Famous Studios. In the early 1960s, the company created Harvey Funnies, the original entertainment company to produce The New Casper Cartoon Show.

=== Harvey Films v. Columbia Pictures ===
On October 28, 1986, Harvey Films filed a lawsuit against Columbia Pictures for infringement claiming that the ghost in the logo of the film Ghostbusters was similar to that of the Ghostly Trio from Casper, specifically Fatso. Columbia argued that Fatso was only a portion of Harvey's, at the time, renewed trademark, and there were three ghosts instead of just one. The court argued that the logos are largely dissimilar and that The Ghostly Trio had only the words of purposes of trademark and the three ghosts while the logo for Ghostbusters has a sign for prohibition with only the torso and head of only one ghost, making the logo seem more coincidental. The expressions are different, with their ghosts having either mischievous or evil facial expressions just to prank, criticize or antagonize Casper, while the other one has the look of bewilderment. The court said:

Accordingly, the Court concludes that the claimed likelihood of confusion has no material basis in fact. The sole evidence which Harvey has produced on this issue are excerpts from magazine articles which suggest a general association between the "Ghostbusters" logo and "Casper" comics. It is clear from reading these articles that there was no confusion whatsoever on the part of the authors. A finding of general association, that the "Ghostbusters" logo is reminiscent of "Casper" characters, does not mean that the prospective moviegoer in purchasing a ticket for "Ghostbusters" thinks that he is going to see a "Casper" cartoon. Neither does it mean that he will think that "Ghostbusters" is derived from "Casper" cartoons or that it is sponsored by the same source as "Casper".

The court dismissed the case for not violating their trademark.

=== Purchase by Jeffrey A. Montgomery ===
In 1989, Jeffrey A. Montgomery purchased Harvey from the Harvey family for $7.5 million. With this, the company became a subsidiary of Montgomery's HMH Communication, based in Santa Monica, California, and was renamed Harvey Comics Entertainment. Universal Pictures secured a 10% stake in Harvey in exchange for producing films based on Casper and select other Harvey properties.

During this period, Montgomery began to re-syndicate the existing animated library as well as reprint older comic book titles. Through Claster Television, Casper & Friends was syndicated to local TV stations for three years between 1990 and 1994, while the "Harvey Classics" comic books began being published around the same time. In 1991, the company licensed out Richie Rich and Casper to Warner Bros. and Universal Pictures respectively to create films based on the characters.

In 1993, Harvey launched two additional comic book imprints to publish titles outside of its existing library - Nemesis Comics and Ultracomics, the latter was made to publish Ultraman comics. In the same year, the company went public under the NASDAQ Small Cap Exchange and was renamed The Harvey Entertainment Company. As such, the first film under its venture was the live-action adaptation of Richie Rich in 1994, produced by Joel Silver and John Davis and starring Macaulay Culkin. The second was the live action/animated film adaptation of Casper, a co-production with Amblin Entertainment, directed by Brad Silberling and starring Christina Ricci and Bill Pullman.Richie Rich was met with negative reviews with critics, but was a moderate success at the box office earning $76 million worldwide against a $40 budget. Casper fared better with both critics and audiences and was more of a box office success earning $290 million worldwide against a $55 million budget; both films would become cult classics.

In March 1994, the company saw increased losses, with its revenue falling 26%. In May, Marvel Comics took over publishing and distribution for Harvey's comic book titles. In September, the first Harvey television series produced exclusively for television, The Baby Huey Show, aired on syndicated television stations for two seasons. The series featured brand new made-for-TV Baby Huey cartoons, as well as an assortment of existing Harvey cartoons, effectively replacing the previous syndication package.

In 1995, the company partnered with MCA and Universal Family Entertainment to launch Universal/Harvey Animation Studios, which produced series based on Harvey Comics' properties. Under its venture, their first produced series The Spooktacular New Adventures of Casper was aired on Fox Kids between 1996 and 1999. It was produced by Universal Cartoon Studios, and acted as a spinoff of the 1995 live-action film, and it was the second newly produced series from Harvey overall.

On May 29, 1996, Harvey commissioned Saban Entertainment to produce new direct-to-video material based on Casper and Richie Rich, with 20th Century Fox Home Entertainment secured as the distributor. This deal was placed outside of the theatrical deal with Universal, of which they would produce a sequel to the 1995 Casper film and retain all other theatrical rights to the character. In September, a third newly produced series, Richie Rich was syndicated for a single series of thirteen episodes.

In February 1997, Harvey re-acquired full merchandising and licensing rights to their properties, including Casper and Richie Rich from Universal Pictures, although they would continue to work with the company on new animated projects. The company reported a net loss of $386,000 in March, which Harvey blamed on the repurchase. Following the release of Casper: A Spirited Beginning in September 1997, the company would expand their deal with Saban Entertainment to include a Casper followup - Casper Meets Wendy for a fall 1998 release, with 20th Century Fox Home Entertainment remaining on board as distributor. A Richie Rich sequel - Richie Rich's Christmas Wish was also released under Saban's deal during Christmas 1998.

In February 1998, Harvey pre-sold a package of HarveyToons cartoons, entitled The HarveyToons Show, to the then-upcoming Fox Family Channel. Jeffrey A. Montgomery and Greg Yulish were ousted from the company in March. On July 27, Harvey announced that through a business plan with the Global Media Management Group, the company would produce a slate of twelve direct-to-video feature films and three television shows.

=== Restructuring ===
In April 1999, the company changed hands after a group of investors purchased it for $17.7 million. The company saw continued losses, including a $250,000 loss for Baby Huey's Great Easter Adventure. In September 1999, Harvey announced that they would purchase the film distributor PM Entertainment from its founders Joseph Merhi and Richard Pepin for $6.5 million and a further $1.45 million in stock. In October, the company entered into a partnership with Spümcø, the company behind Ren & Stimpy, to produce web-exclusive content featuring an assortment of Harvey characters. In November, the company signed a theme park deal with Landmark Entertainment Group to construct and design a theme park featuring the Harvey characters. The company attended its first MIPCOM in November 1999 after entering the self-distribution market, announcing the work of a new CGI-animated Casper Christmas movie with Mainframe Entertainment and a live-action Baby Huey series aimed towards a pre-school audience. Harvey Home Entertainment also released several HarveyToons VHS releases with Universal Studios Home Video. The Casper project with Mainframe was officially announced in December.

Harvey's purchase of PM Entertainment was closed in January 2000, with PM becoming a fully owned subsidiary of Harvey. In February, the company launched a new subsidiary, Harvey Fashion LLC, as a joint-venture with PG Capital. Harvey Fashion would manufacture, sell and market apparel collections based on the classic Harvey characters. In March, the company teamed up with Studio B Productions to produce a new television series featuring Wendy the Good Little Witch, entitled Wendy the Witch, for an early-2001 delivery. The company engaged in third-party distribution in April 2000 by becoming the international sales representative and distributor of the animation studio Film Roman, the animation studio best known for The Simpsons and King of the Hill, and also had previously collaborated with Harvey with both 1996 Richie Rich series and season two of The Baby Huey Show. In May, the company acquired television rights to the website Walter Miller's Home Page, allowing Harvey to branch off to primetime television. Universal acquired North American distribution rights to Casper's Haunted Christmas in June. In the same month, Harvey entered into a worldwide licensing agreement with Hearst Entertainment, with the latter handling merchandising and licensing to bring the Harvey Classics over to a new generation. At the beginning of August, the company secured a deal with website ThinkBox to add its characters to ThinkBox's kids portal, with Harvey also receiving an equity position in ThinkBox. On August 17, the company purchased North American distribution rights to the movie A Monkey's Tale from Pearson Television International.

=== Sale to Classic Media and DreamWorks Animation (and later years) ===
Harvey Entertainment, Inc.
- Founded: 2001; 25 years ago
- Fate: Name brand
- Headquarters: United States
- Products: Casper the Friendly Ghost; The Ghostly Trio; Richie Rich; Baby Huey; Little Dot; Little Audrey; Little Lotta; Wendy the Good Little Witch; Hot Stuff the Little Devil
- Owner: DreamWorks Animation (2012–present) (NBCUniversal (2016–present))
- Parent: Classic Media

In August 2000, it was reported that over nine companies, including Canadian-based Lions Gate Entertainment were interested in purchasing Harvey. At the end of the month, the newly formed Classic Media announced that they would purchase a 60% stake in the company for a cash-and-stock deal valued at $30 million. The deal fell through at the beginning of November. During the end of 2000, Harvey was on the verge of collapsing into liquidation. As such, to save money, Harvey sold international sales rights to the PM Entertainment library to CineTel Films in February 2001.

Following the failed purchase prior, on March 8, 2001, The Harvey Entertainment Company announced that Classic Media would purchase all its media library for $17 million. The deal would include Harvey's entire library of classic characters, film library, print materials, the "Harvey" brand and logo, among others. The Harvey Entertainment Company (including PM Entertainment) itself would not be included in the sale and would be renamed. The deal was verified by the two businesses in May and officially closed on June 26. The following day, the Harvey Entertainment Company was renamed Sunland Entertainment Co., putting a focus exclusively on the PM Entertainment catalogue while Classic Media formed Harvey Entertainment Inc. to hold all copyrights to the Harvey catalog.

In 2003, Roger Burlage sold the remains of Sunland Entertainment and PM Entertainment, alongside its library, to a group of investors who also purchased out the assets of CineTel Films. With this, Echo Bridge Entertainment was formed. In 2006, Casper's Scare School would air on Cartoon Network as the first ever venture from Classic Media. Genius would release a compilation of Harveytoons shorts on November that same year. Beginning in 2007, Genius would strike a deal with Harvey's parent company Echo Bridge, including Classic Media, to distribute their output on DVD as part of their long-term deal. As such, more compilations of Harveytoons shorts would be released on DVD during between 2007 and 2008. A TV series that serves as a sequel to its TV movie would air on Cartoon Network from 2009 to 2012. In addition, a comic series that was to celebrate 60 years of Casper would be issued by Arden Entertainment from 2009 to 2010. In 2009, Classic Media's home media distributors Genius Products and Echo Bridge were sold to Vivendi Entertainment, as the former company went into Chapter 11 bankruptcy due to being victims of the worldwide recession.

In 2012, DreamWorks Animation would purchase Classic Media (including the Harvey library), and its parent company would be renamed as DreamWorks Classics. It would become an official subsidiary of NBCUniversal in 2016. As such, the majority of Harvey Entertainment's library are currently owned by NBCUniversal, a division of Comcast.

Several attempts were made to revive the Harvey brand, especially for film and TV. In 2013, DreamWorks Animation announced that they were rebooting Casper as a computer-animated film, with Simon Wells, who at one point was previously attached to write and direct the unproduced sequel to the 1995 live-action film, to return to write and direct this supposed reboot, and John Altschuler and Dave Krinsky (King of the Hill, Blades of Glory) to co-write the film's script. The next year in April 2014, DreamWorks Animation was developing a live-action animated film based on another Harvey Comics character, Hot Stuff the Little Devil, with Lizzie and Wendy Molyneux (Bob's Burgers) to pen the script. Both films were originally set to be DreamWorks' next attempts at theatrical films based on characters from the Classic Media libraries following Mr. Peabody & Sherman, and were set to kick off a cinematic universe featuring the Harvey Entertainment characters (as a response to Marvel's own cinematic universe), but nothing came of it after both were announced. Concept art for an unproduced CGI Casper film was posted on ArtStation by animator Danny Williams in December 2023, stating that the pitch "never went anywhere".

In 2017, more comics were released by Dynamite Entertainment to celebrate the characters and legacy. From 2018 to 2020, DreamWorks Television Animation would air for Netflix called Harvey Street Kids, also known as Harvey Girls Forever!. In April 2022, DreamWorks Television Animation would announce that a live-action animated TV series for Peacock would be in development, with Wu Kai-yu (Hannibal, The Flash, The Ghost Bride) being the showrunner, but with no further updates as of November 2025, as the project was quietly cancelled. It was instead announced in 2026 for another new series for Disney+, inspired by Netflix's Wednesday, with Steven Spielberg, Rob Letterman, and Hilary Winston set to be executive producers, the former of which had previously executive produced the 1995 film.

Currently, most Harvey's cartoons, such as those that were produced by Paramount's Famous Studios between the '40s through '60s air on MeTV Toons, with the 1979 special Casper's Halloween Special, produced by Hanna-Barbera, airing seasonally during Halloween.

== Filmography ==
=== Under Harvey Films ===
Theatrical films

- The Sad Sack (1957 live-action film) (distributed by Paramount Pictures)
- Richie Rich (1994 live-action film) (co-production with Warner Bros. Family Entertainment, Silver Pictures, and Davis Entertainment, distributed by Warner Bros. Pictures)
- Casper (1995 live-action/animated film) (co-production with Universal Pictures and Amblin Entertainment; distributed by Universal Pictures)

TV series

- Matty's Funday Funnies (1959–1962)
- The New Casper Cartoon Show (1963–1964) (co-production with Paramount Cartoon Studios)
- Casper and the Angels (1979–1980) (co-production with Hanna-Barbera)
  - Casper's Halloween Special (TV special) (1979) (co-production with Hanna-Barbera)
  - Casper's First Christmas (TV special) (1979) (co-production with Hanna-Barbera)
- The Richie Rich/Scooby-Doo Show (1980–1982) (co-production with Hanna-Barbera)
- The Pac-Man/Little Rascals/Richie Rich Show (1982–1984) (co-production with Hanna-Barbera)
- Casper and Friends (1990–1994)
- Casper: Classics (1994–1995)
- The Baby Huey Show (1994–1996) (co-production with Carbunkle Cartoons (season 1) and Film Roman (season 2))
- Casper (1996–1998) (aka The Spooktacular New Adventures of Casper) (co-production with Amblin Television and Universal Cartoon Studios)
- Richie Rich (1996) (co-production with Film Roman)
- The Harveytoons Show (1998–2001)

Direct-to-video

- Casper: A Spirited Beginning (1997) (co-production with Saban Entertainment, distributed by 20th Century Fox Home Entertainment)
- Casper Meets Wendy (1998) (co-production with Saban Entertainment, distributed by 20th Century Fox Home Entertainment)
- Richie Rich's Christmas Wish (1998) (co-production with Saban Entertainment, distributed by Warner Home Video)
- Baby Huey's Great Easter Adventure (1999) (Distributed by Columbia TriStar Home Video, self-distributed overseas)
- Casper's Haunted Christmas (2000) (co-production with Mainframe Entertainment, distributed by Universal Studios Home Video, self-distributed overseas)

Unproduced projects

- Casper 2 (co-production with Universal Pictures and Amblin Entertainment)
- Hot Stuff
- Bunny
- Richie Rich Goes First Class
- Wendy

=== Under Harvey Entertainment ===
Direct-to-video

- Casper's Scare School (2006, TV movie) (co-production with Kapow Pictures and Alligator Planet, distributed by Classic Media and Genius Products, distributed by Warner Home Video in some countries)

TV series

- Casper's Scare School (2009–2012) (co-production with MoonScoop and DQ Entertainment)
- Harvey Street Kids (2018–2020) (aka Harvey Girls Forever!) (co-production with DreamWorks Animation Television, distributed by Netflix)

Upcoming projects

- Untitled Rob Letterman/Steven Spielberg live-action/CGI Casper TV series (co-production with Universal Content Productions and Amblin Entertainment, distributed by Disney+)

Unproduced projects

- Untitled CGI Casper film (co-production with DreamWorks Animation; possibly distributed by 20th Century Fox)
- Untitled live-action/CGI Hot Stuff film (co-production with DreamWorks Animation; possibly distributed by 20th Century Fox)
- Untitled Kai Yu Wu live-action/CGI Casper TV series (co-production with Universal Content Productions and DreamWorks Animation Television, distributed by Peacock)
