= Julie McWhirter =

American actress

- Born: Julia Ann McWhirter; 1947 (age 78–79); Indianapolis, Indiana, U.S.
- Education: Lawrence Central High School; Depauw University
- Occupations: Voice actress, impressionist
- Years active: 1970–1993
- Notable credit(s): Jeannie as Jeannie Jabberjaw as Bubbles; The Smurfs as Baby Smurf and Sassette
- Spouse(s): Rick Dees (m. 1978)
- Children: 1

Julia Anne McWhirter (born 1947) is a retired American voice actress and impressionist best known for her work as Jeannie in the animated version of Jeannie, Bubbles in Jabberjaw and Baby Smurf and Sassette in The Smurfs.

== Early life and career ==
An Indianapolis native, McWhirter is one of four children born to Margaret Anne (née Jennings) and Felix T. McWhirter. By 1966, her senior year at Lawrence Central High School, McWhirter had established herself, both as an actress—portraying Eliza Doolittle in My Fair Lady—and a skilled mimic, whose repertoire included Alfred Hitchcock and Tammy Grimes. McWhirter graduated from DePauw University in 1970, with a degree in speech.

Hollywood Reporter critic Frank Barron caught McWhirter's act in August 1977, opening for Mort Sahl at the The Comedy Store, in West Hollywood.

Julie McWhirter, soon to be seen on CBS-TV's 'Wacko' show, is a nightclub natural. Her satirical take-offs on female stars are devastating, particularly lampooning a girl singer on the Ramada Inn circuit. Also hilarious is her version of Dolly Parton-type country singers. And – the comedienne writes most of her funny material.

== Personal life ==
In April 1978, McWhirter married fellow performer Rick Dees, whom she had met the previous year, while working on the CBS children's series, Wacko. They have one child, a son.

== Filmography ==
=== Animated series ===
| Year | Title | Role | Notes |
|---|---|---|---|
| 1970 | Famous Classic Tales | Additional voices | Episode: "Tales of Washington Irving" |
| 1972 | The Barkleys | Terry Barkley | 13 episodes |
| 1973–75 | Jeannie | Jeannie | 16 episodes |
| 1973 | The New Scooby-Doo Movies | Jeannie | Episode: "Mystery in Persia" |
| 1974–75 | Partridge Family 2200 A.D. | Marion Moonglow | 16 episodes |
| 1976 | Clue Club | Additional voices | |
| 1976 | The Scooby-Doo/Dynomutt Hour | Queen Hornet | 2 episodes |
| 1976 | Jabberjaw | Bubbles | 16 episodes |
| 1977–80 | Captain Caveman and the Teen Angels | Additional voices | 40 episodes |
| 1977 | CB Bears | Additional voices | |
| 1977–78 | The Skatebirds | Additional voices | Woofer & Wimper, Dog Detectives segment |
| 1977–78 | Fred Flintstone and Friends | Jeannie / Marion | 95 episodes |
| 1978 | Dynomutt, Dog Wonder | Queen Hornet | 2 episodes |
| 1978 | The Adventures of the Little Prince | Little Prince | 26 episodes (English dub) |
| 1979 | Casper and the Angels | Casper | 13 episodes |
| 1979–80 | The Plastic Man Comedy/Adventure Show | Additional voices | |
| 1979 | Casper's Halloween Special | Casper | TV special |
| 1979 | Casper's First Christmas | Casper | TV special |
| 1980 | The World of Strawberry Shortcake | Huckleberry Pie | TV special |
| 1980–82 | Drak Pack | Vampira | 16 episodes |
| 1980 | The Flintstones' New Neighbors | Hidea Frankenstone | TV special |
| 1980–81 | Thundarr the Barbarian | Cinda / Stryia | 2 episodes |
| 1980 | Super Friends | Additional voices | |
| 1981 | Strawberry Shortcake in Big Apple City | Huckleberry Pie / T.N. Honey | TV special |
| 1981 | The Flintstones: Wind-Up Wilma | Hidea Franeknstone | TV special |
| 1981–82 | Laverne & Shirley in the Army | Additional voices | |
| 1982 | Strawberry Shortcake: Pets on Parade | Huckleberry Pie | TV special |
| 1982 | Stanley, the Ugly Duckling | Additional voices | TV special |
| 1982 | Pandamonium | Amanda Panda | 13 episodes |
| 1982 | The Gary Coleman Show | Lydia | 2 episodes |
| 1982 | Mork & Mindy/Laverne & Shirley/Fonz Hour | Broom Gilda | Episode: "Which Witch Is the Witch" |
| 1982–83 | Pac-Man | Dinky | 4 episodes |
| 1982–84 | The Little Rascals | Alfalfa / Porky / Woim | 31 episodes |
| 1983 | ABC Weekend Specials | Pollywog / Green Lady / Woman | Episode: "The Secret World of Og" |
| 1983–85 | Alvin and the Chipmunks | Additional voices | |
| 1983 | Saturday Supercade | Q*Bertha / Q*Mom / Viper | Episode #1.3 |
| 1983–90 | The Smurfs | Baby Smurf / Sassette Smurfling | |
| 1984 | The Smurfic Games | Baby Smurf | TV special |
| 1984–85 | The Littles | Additional voices | |
| 1985 | The Jetsons | Additional voices | Episode: "Elroy in Wonderland" |
| 1986 | Smurfquest | Baby Smurf / Sassette Smurfling | TV film |
| 1986–87 | The Flintstone Kids | Wilma Slaghoople / Tarpit Tommy | |
| 1987 | The Jetsons Meet the Flintstones | Betty Rubble / Jet Rivers / Investor | TV film |
| 1987 | 'Tis the Season to Be Smurfy | Baby Smurf / Sassette Smurfling | TV special |
| 1991–93 | The Pirates of Dark Water | Additional voices | |
| 1992 | Bobby's World | Additional voices | Episode: "The Play's the Thing" |
| 1993 | The Town Santa Forgot | Additional voices | TV special |

=== Television live-action appearances ===
| Year | Title | Role | Notes |
|---|---|---|---|
| 1970 | Happy Days | Herself | 10 episodes |
| 1970 | Information Processing | Herself | Documentary short |
| 1973 | The Bobby Darin Show | Herself | 2 episodes |
| 1976 | The Hollywood Squares | Herself | 5 episodes |
| 1976 | The Rich Little Show | Herself | 12 episodes |
| 1976–78 | The Mike Douglas Show | Herself: Impressionist | 5 episodes |
| 1977 | The Dean Martin Celebrity Roast: Ted Knight | Herself | TV special |
| 1977 | The Alan Hamel Show | Herself | 1 episode |
| 1977 | Wacko | Herself: Host | 10 episodes |
| 1980 | Steve Martin: All Commercials... A Steve Martin Special | Herself | TV special |
| 1981 | The Alan Thicke Show | Herself | 1 episode |
| 1981 | The John Davidson Show | Herself | 1 episode |
| 1984 | TV's Bloopers & Practical Jokes | Herself | 1 episode |
| 1988 | The New Hollywood Squares | Herself | 1 episode |

=== Animated film ===
| Year | Title | Role | Notes |
|---|---|---|---|
| 1976 | Snooper Goop | | Live-action/Animated short |
| 1979 | The Story of Heidi | Neighbor Lady, Peter's Mother | English dub |
| 1983 | Winnie the Pooh and a Day for Eeyore | Kanga | Animated short |
