= Joe Oriolo =

American cartoonist

- Born: Joseph Dominic Oriolo; February 21, 1913; Union City, New Jersey, U.S.
- Died: December 25, 1985 (aged 72); Hackensack, New Jersey, U.S.
- Notable work: Casper the Friendly Ghost; Felix the Cat

Joseph Dominic Oriolo (/ɔːriˈɒloʊ/; February 21, 1913 – December 25, 1985) was an American cartoon animator, writer, director and producer, known as the co-creator of Casper the Friendly Ghost and the creator of the Felix the Cat TV series. He provided the voice of the Italian barber in Gulliver's Travels.

== Early life ==
Oriolo was born in Union City, New Jersey in 1913, the son of Italian immigrants. He graduated from Union Hill High School and moved to New York City, and enrolled in the Cooper Union.

== Career ==
In 1933, at age 20, he went to work for Fleischer Studios as an errand boy, where his talent as a draftsman and his ambitions advanced him to the position of an animator within one year. During the late 1930s, he worked on a number of studio shorts, and when the studio moved to Miami in 1938 he went with it. There, in addition to the shorts, he worked on both of the studio's feature-length films, Gulliver's Travels and Mr. Bug Goes to Town, as well as the two-reel Raggedy Ann & Raggedy Andy. Paramount took over the Fleischer studio in 1942 and reestablished it in New York as Famous Studios. Joe Oriolo met Otto Messmer (who was employed with the studio as a storyboard artist from 1944–46) before leaving in 1944.

In 1939, either he or author Seymour Reit created the character of Casper the Friendly Ghost for a children's book; Reit said he came up with the idea on his own and then gave it to Oriolo to illustrate, while Oriolo said that the idea was his and Reit wrote the book under his direction. Two subsequent books, There's Good Boos To-Night and A Haunting We Will Go followed before Oriolo sold the rights to Famous Studios for $200. Casper went on to become one of the studios' most popular animated series before being sold to Alfred Harvey (whose Harvey Comics began producing Casper comic books in 1952) on July 27, 1958.

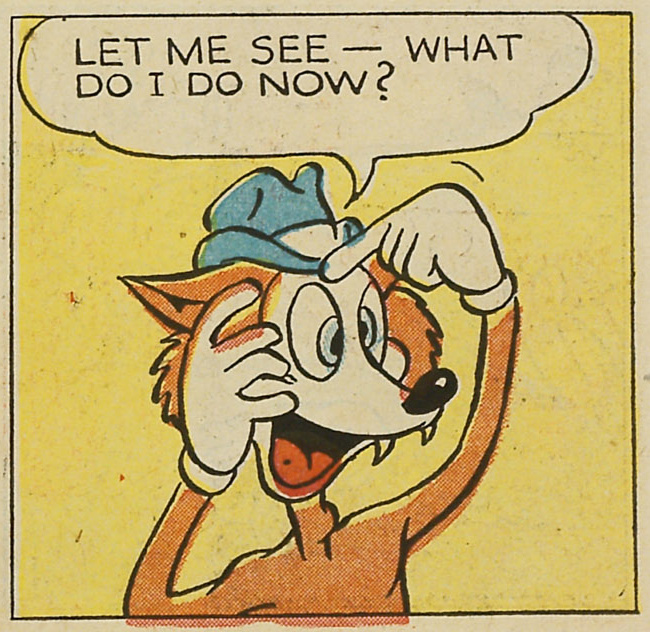
Bernie the Fox in his appearance in Coo Coo Comics #3 (February 1943).

After leaving Famous Studios, Oriolo began working as a freelance animator on films for the armed forces and industrial films, as well as some of the earliest TV commercials. He began drawing comic books (including Fawcett's George Pal Puppetoons), and began working with Otto Messmer on the Felix the Cat comic books until they ceased publication. In 1954, Oriolo assumed authorship of the separate Felix daily comic strips at the request of King Features Syndicate, which he continued to produce until 1969.

In 1958, Joe became a business partner with Sullivan, who was the nephew of William O Sullivan, the brother of Pat Sullivan, and the original copyright owner of Felix the Cat. Together, they formed Felix the Cat Productions, Inc (named after the famous character of the same name) and created the pilot show for the award-winning Felix the Cat television series. Making use of many former Fleischer/Famous animators and directors, 260 Felix shorts were made for television syndication in 1960. Oriolo built on this success in 1963 with both The Mighty Hercules and Beetle Bailey. In 1967 Oriolo Studios created Johnny Cypher in Dimension Zero. In 1969, Ribbon no Kishi was brought to the U.S. by Joe Oriolo and Burt Hecht. It was retitled Princess Knight and purchased from Mushi Productions; English dialogue scripts were written and voices dubbed. Later, the business arrangement between Oriolo and Hecht fell apart; and as part of the settlement, Hecht departed with the Princess Knight masters in 1970. As a result, the company ultimately scrapped the show before it could be broadcast. For a number of years, it was thought that all of the English-language dubs of the series had been either lost or destroyed. However, the English-language masters of the series were found in the Netherlands in 1996.

By 1971, when Sullivan's nephew died, Oriolo had taken complete control of Felix the Cat and continued to market the character right up until his death.

== Death ==
A resident of Woodcliff Lake, New Jersey, Oriolo died at the age of 72 at Hackensack University Medical Center in Hackensack, New Jersey. He is buried in George Washington Memorial Park in Paramus, New Jersey.

Felix the Cat: The Movie is dedicated to his memory.
