= Seymour Reit =

American cartoonist (1918–2001)

- Born: Seymour Victory Reit; November 11, 1918; New York City, U.S.
- Died: November 21, 2001 (aged 83); New York City, U.S.
- Other name: Sy Reit
- Education: New York University
- Occupations: Writer, cartoonist
- Writing career
- Notable work: Casper the Friendly Ghost

Seymour Victory Reit (/riːt/; 11 November 1918 – 21 November 2001) was an American author of over 80 children's books as well as several works for adults. Reit claimed to be the creator of the character Casper the Friendly Ghost, and several co-workers supported his claim, though cartoonist Joe Oriolo, who drew the first Casper book, claimed that he created Casper and Reit wrote the book under his direction. Reit started his career working for Fleischer Studios as an animator; he also worked for Jerry Iger and Will Eisner as a cartoonist, for Laffboy as editor in 1965, and for Mad Magazine and several other publications as a humorist.

== Biography ==
Reit was born in New York City on 11 November 1918 (Armistice Day). He attended DeWitt Clinton High School and New York University, where he drew cartoons for humorous college magazines. He worked as an in-betweener and inker on the 1939 animated film Gulliver's Travels, and later became a gag writer for the Popeye and Betty Boop cartoon series, among others. He also anonymously produced comic strips for Jerry Iger under the Fiction House label. He attended New York University with future Captain Marvel writer William Woolfolk, and helped launch Woolfolk's career as a writer of comics by introducing him to Jerry Iger and Will Eisner.

Reit served in World War II in a U.S. Army Air Force camouflage unit tasked with defending the West Coast from a Japanese invasion, and later served in Europe after D-Day. He later wrote a book, The Amazing Camouflage Deceptions of World War II, drawing on his wartime experience. It contains a version of the urban legend which claims that British aviators taunted the German Army by dropping a wooden bomb on a decoy airfield the Germans had built.

After the war, Reit did cartoon work for Archie and Little Lulu, and wrote gags for some of the new Casper animated shorts that were being produced. He also wrote for the TV series Captain Kangaroo. In 1950 he started working for the publications department of the Bank Street College of Education in New York, and also scripted industrial films and radio shows. In the late 1950s, he began submitting work to Mad Magazine, ultimately contributing over 60 pieces. One of Reit's articles for Mad, "The 'Down-To-Earth' Coloring Book," appeared in the summer of 1960 and anticipated (or helped inspire) the faddish publishing boom of "adult" coloring books.

Neither Reit nor Joe Oriolo, the other claimed creator of Casper, ever earned royalties from Casper's works and merchandising, since they had not secured the rights to the character. However, the makers of the 1995 Casper film gave Reit a substantial honorarium.

== Books ==
Reit wrote over 80 books, primarily for children, on a variety of historical, technical, natural, and other subjects. One of his titles for adults, The Day They Stole the Mona Lisa, written in 1981, is about the theft of the Mona Lisa from the Louvre in 1911. In the book, Reit asserted that there were two genuine Mona Lisas in the world: the one in the Louvre, and an earlier version of the work painted by Leonardo da Vinci which was being held in a bank vault in New Jersey (the Vernon Mona Lisa). A long-planned movie adaptation of the book has never materialized, although the Internet Movie Database lists a movie by the same title that had tentatively been planned for 2009.

=== Selected works ===
| Book | Year | Publisher | Pages | Notes |
|---|---|---|---|---|
| Guns for General Washington | 2001 | Gulliver Books Paperbacks | 160 | About William and Henry Knox, brothers tasked with transporting 60 tons of cannons 300 miles that played a decisive role in the Siege of Boston. |
| A Dog's Tale | 1996 | Random House Children's Books | 32 | Featured on episode 137 of the PBS TV series Reading Rainbow. |
| Trains | 1990 | Western Publishing | 45 | An illustrated history of railway transportation. |
| Behind Rebel Lines | 1988 | Harcourt Children's Books | 130 | About Sarah Emma Edmonds, a woman who masqueraded as a man and served as a spy for the Union Army during the United States Civil War. |
| Scotland Yard Detective | 1987 | Bantam Books | 144 | Part of the Time Machine series, a spinoff of the Choose Your Own Adventure books. |
| Sibling Rivalry | 1985 | Ballantine Books | 171 | About the causes of sibling rivalry and how to cope with it. |
| The Day They Stole the Mona Lisa | 1981 | Summit Books | 254 | About the theft of the Mona Lisa. |
| The Pleasure of Their Company: How to Have More Fun with Your Children | 1981 | Chilton Book Co. | 373 | Suggests activities for children and adults to share and techniques for controlling children's television-watching, diet, and play habits. |
| Masquerade: The Amazing Camouflage Deceptions of World War II | 1978 | Hawthorn Books | 255 | Reprinted in 1980 as The Hidden War: The Amazing Camouflage Deception of World War II. |
| Sails, Rails, and Wings | 1978 | Golden Press | 69 | About the three different types of transportation, as illustrated by Roberto Innocenti. |
| Ironclad!: A True Story of the Civil War | 1977 | Dodd, Mead | 92 | |
| The Worried Ghost | 1976 | Scholastic Book Services | 95 | |
| Race Against Death: A True Story of the Far North | 1976 | Dodd, Mead | 94 | About the 1925 serum run to Nome, Alaska. |
| Benvenuto and the Carnival | 1976 | Xerox Education Publications | 93 | A boy's pet dragon is captured and placed in a carnival. |
| Benvenuto | 1974 | Addison-Wesley | 126 | About a boy who brings home a dragon from camp. |
| Rice Cakes and Paper Dragons | 1973 | Dodd, Mead | 79 | About a girl living in New York City's Chinatown. |
| The Easy How-To Book | 1973 | Golden Press | 48 | Instruction for children on how to do everyday tasks. |
| Child of the Navajos | 1971 | Dodd, Mead | 64 | About a nine-year-old boy living on a modern Indian reservation. |
| The Magic of Everyday Things | 1970 | Western Publishing | 62 | |
| Growing Up in the White House | 1968 | Crowell-Collier Press | 118 | A history of presidential children. |
| America Laughs: a Treasury of Great Humor | 1966 | Crowell-Collier Press | 152 | |
| Coins and Coin Collecting | 1965 | Golden Press | 105 | An introductory manual for numismatists. |
| All Kinds of Signs | 1963 | Golden Press | 30 | Picture book "showing all kinds of signs and the importance of signs in everyday life"; illustrated by Trina Schart (Trina Schart Hyman) |
| Wheels, Sails, and Wings | 1961 | Golden Press | 94 | |
| The King Who Learned To Smile | 1960 | Golden Press | 30 | Reit's earliest record in the Library of Congress Online Catalog. |

In addition to those listed here, Reit wrote several books for Golden Press, publishers of the Little Golden Books series, and dozens of other children's books for assorted publishers.
