= Goren (disambiguation) =

Goren is a settlement is Israel

Goren may also refer to:

- Goren, Hebrew surname
- Gören, Turkish surname
- Goren Trophy, an American Contract Bridge trophy

== See also ==
- Göhren (disambiguation)
