= Beth Sholom Synagogue (Elkins Park, Pennsylvania) =

Conservative synagogue in Pennsylvania, US

- Location in Greater Philadelphia Location in Pennsylvania Location in the United States

Religion
- Affiliation: Conservative Judaism
- Ecclesiastical or organisational status: Synagogue
- Leadership: Rabbi David Glanzberg-Krainin
- Status: Active

Location
- Location: 8231 Old York Road
- Municipality: Elkins Park, Cheltenham Township
- State: Pennsylvania
- Country: United States
- Coordinates: 40°04′56″N 75°07′36″W

Architecture
- Architect: Frank Lloyd Wright
- Type: Synagogue architecture
- Style: Modernist; Mayan Revival
- Established: 1959 (current synagogue); 1919 (as a congregation)
- Groundbreaking: November 14, 1954
- Completed: September 20, 1959

Specifications
- Direction of façade: West (main facade)
- Capacity: 1,000+ (main sanctuary); 250+ (Sisterhood Sanctuary)
- Width: 175 feet (53 m)
- Height (max): 100 feet (30 m)
- Materials: Corrugated wire glass; fiberglass

Website
- bethsholomcongregation.org
- Beth Sholom Synagogue
- U.S. National Register of Historic Places
- U.S. National Historic Landmark
- Pennsylvania state historical marker
- Area: 3.9 acres (1.6 ha)
- NRHP reference No.: 07000430

Significant dates
- Added to NRHP: March 29, 2007
- Designated NHL: March 29, 2007
- Designated PHMC: September 21, 2008

Beth Sholom Synagogue is a Conservative Jewish synagogue at 8231 Old York Road in Elkins Park, a suburb of Philadelphia, Pennsylvania, United States. The main synagogue building, completed in 1959, was the only Jewish house of worship designed by Frank Lloyd Wright; it consists of a hexagonal base topped by a tetrahedron-shaped pyramidal roof. There is a doughnut-shaped annex south of the main building, designed by Israel Demchick and Thalheimer & Weitz, which is used as both a school and auditorium.

Beth Sholom's congregation was established in 1919 and originally occupied a building at the intersection of Broad Street, Courtland Street, and Belfield Avenue, which was dedicated in 1921. Many members moved to Philadelphia's suburbs after World War II, prompting Beth Sholom's first senior rabbi, Mortimer J. Cohen, to buy land in Elkins Park in 1949. The annex opened in 1951, and Cohen hired Wright to design the Elkins Park synagogue two years later. Due to various delays and construction difficulties, the synagogue was not dedicated until September 20, 1959, after Wright died. Beth Sholom merged with the West Oak Lane Jewish Community Center in 1978 and Temple Sholom in 2004. Membership declined in the early 21st century, and a visitor center opened at Beth Sholom Synagogue in 2009.

The main building is a National Historic Landmark and has a facade made of glass, steel, and reinforced concrete. The 100-foot-tall (30 m) roof is made of corrugated plastic and wire glass, suspended between three steel-and-concrete beams. The hexagonal interior measures 175 feet (53 m) wide, with furnishings designed by Wright. Two vestibules to the west lead to a main sanctuary on the second floor, with more than 1,000 seats. The main sanctuary's floor slopes down toward the center of the room, with seats facing a bimah in the east, while its ceiling slopes up toward the roof. The first floor of the synagogue contains the Sisterhood Sanctuary, and there are also two lounges and a mechanical cellar. Beth Sholom Synagogue has received extensive architectural and religious commentary over the years.

== History ==
=== Background ===
==== Congregation establishment and first synagogue ====
Beth Sholom Synagogue's congregation dates to 1917, when twenty-five families collaborated to establish a congregation in Logan, a neighborhood in North Philadelphia. Jewish families had started moving to Logan in the 1880s, and the neighborhood housed 3,000 Jewish families by the late 1910s. Beth Sholom was incorporated in 1919; its name, meaning "House of Peace" in Hebrew, had been suggested by Cyrus Adler to commemorate the end of World War I. Although the congregation was officially Conservative Jewish, many of its members were formerly part of Liberal Jewish congregations. The congregants originally met in a tent, though in 1919, the congregation obtained a site at the intersection of Broad Street, Courtland Street, and Belfield Avenue, where they developed their first synagogue. It would later become one of at least six synagogues along Broad Street in North Philadelphia.

Mortimer J. Cohen was appointed as the congregation's first senior rabbi effective May 1, 1920, when he was 25 years old. During his four-decade tenure, Cohen enacted more religiously progressive positions such as English-language services, mixed-gender seating, a mixed-gender religious school, and organ performances. The first synagogue's cornerstone was laid on May 31, 1920, and the synagogue was dedicated on September 25, 1921. J. Ethan Feldstein and Edwin L. Rothschild were the architects, while Benjamin Bornstein (who later became the congregation's president) was the general contractor. The structure was a two-story Georgian Revival or Italian Renaissance structure with a facade of granite, brick, terracotta, and limestone. The sanctuary was variously cited as having a capacity of 1,200 or 1,900 people. It had a domed ceiling, a wood-paneled altar in the center, and twelve windows representing the Twelve Tribes of Israel. In total, the structure cost an estimated $175,000 or $200,000. (Note: About $2.07–2.365 million in 2024)

Soon after the first synagogue was completed, Beth Sholom's members began raising money so they could issue bonds to pay off the mortgage loan. Beth Sholom renovated the first synagogue for $25,000 in 1927, (Note: About $362,000 in 2024) adding a Hebrew school. The opening of the Broad Street subway line in 1928 led more Jews to move to Logan, some of whom joined Beth Sholom. By the congregation's 10th anniversary in 1929, the surrounding area had become one of the largest Jewish enclaves in Philadelphia. The congregation had grown to include 400 families by 1935; its Hebrew school taught 350 children every Sunday, and members had formed groups for women, men, and youth.

==== Elkins Park annex ====
After World War II, many urban synagogues across the U.S. moved to the suburbs, prompted by the increasing popularity of automobile travel. Beth Sholom was among Philadelphia's first such congregations to make this move, as many of its members had moved to the Philadelphia suburbs. The congregation's membership was rapidly declining, and some members' children had moved to the southern part of Montgomery County (which included the unincorporated community of Elkins Park in Cheltenham Township) after they got married. In 1949, Beth Sholom Congregation bought a 4.5-acre (1.8 ha) site on York Road in Elkins Park. This site, costing $13,500, (Note: About $141,000 in 2024) measured 300 feet (91 m) wide and was slightly south of Foxcroft Road. Although Cohen wanted to develop a new synagogue there, some of the congregants resisted the idea, so a school was built there. The congregation hired Israel Demchick to design a modern-style structure and requested the Cheltenham Township government's permission to establish a school and chapel. The cornerstone of the new Elkins Park annex was laid in November 1950. The congregation's onetime president Herman Bornstein and his son Benjamin were the general contractors.

The first part of the annex, consisting of the classrooms, was opened in September 1951. The full structure was dedicated in October 1952, having cost $540,000. (Note: About $4.99 million in 2024) The annex started hosting Shabbat services in October 1953, and Shabbat services and High Holy Days celebrations alternated between the annex and the original synagogue. The annex's school was formally renamed the Philip L. Sheerr Religious School, after one of the congregation's former presidents, in May 1954. An academy for Jewish culture was established there the next year, and the congregation's religious school was also expanded. The annex began hosting the Gratz College School of Observation and Practice starting in 1955. Within two years of the structure's completion, Cohen had expressed his displeasure with the annex's size, acoustics, capacity, and ventilation.

=== Development ===
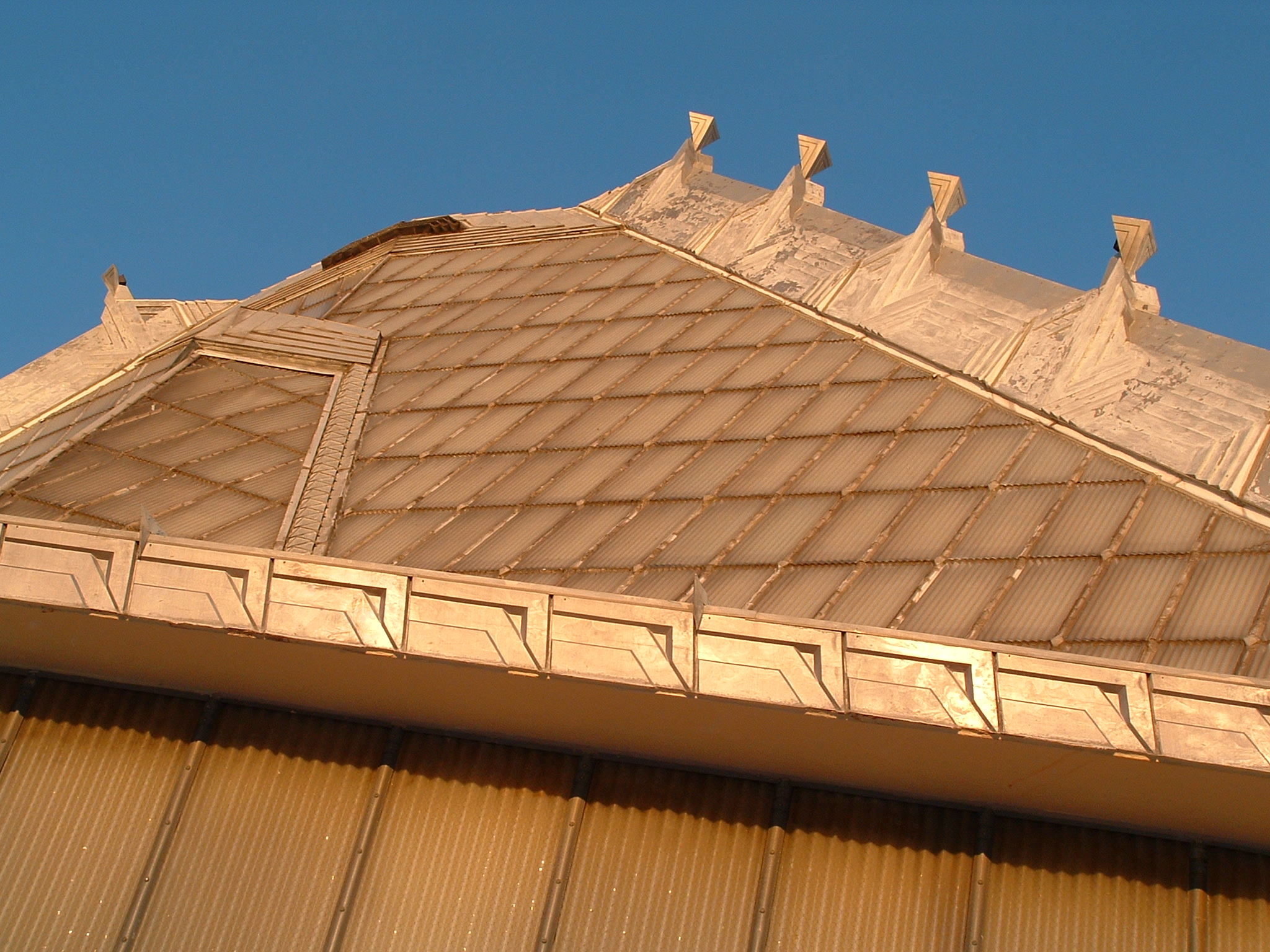
The roof at sunset

In 1952, the congregation bought some land from Edith Breyer—the widow of Henry Breyer, who had founded the ice cream brand Breyers—for $700,000. (Note: About $6.619 million in 2024) The new land, adjacent to the existing annex, included 5 acres (2.0 ha) of land, which contained the Henry West Breyer Sr. House. By then, Cohen was advocating for the congregation to move the synagogue to Elkins Park as well, expressing concerns that, if Beth Sholom did not move quickly, other congregations would take its members.

==== Planning and architect selection ====
Cohen wanted the new synagogue to honor American liberty and the 300th anniversary of the first organized migration of Jews to North America. At the same time, he wanted to avoid older synagogue architecture styles, particularly the Moorish and Gothic styles, instead seeking a more modern design. Though the International Style was the prevailing modern architectural style of the time, Cohen eschewed it as too simplistic, since he wanted the synagogue to indicate clearly that it was a Jewish house of worship. Cohen had never created a drawing or painting before, and his knowledge of architecture was limited to Jewish styles, but he began devising sketches for what he wanted the new temple to look like. His early sketches called for an octagonal sanctuary centered around a bimah, in a similar manner to Sephardic Jewish synagogues. The congregation had not formally approved the plans, nor did it have the money, but Cohen was still determined to develop a new building.

The idea to hire Frank Lloyd Wright, a proponent of organic architecture, had come from Boris Blai, a local sculptor who was familiar with both Cohen and Wright. Although Wright was well-known, the scholar George W. Goodwin wrote that Cohen probably was unaware of the architect's previous work, such as Fallingwater and the Suntop Homes. Cohen ultimately decided to contact Wright in November 1953, sending Wright his sketches. Although Wright typically did not have a high opinion of potential clients who sent him sketches, he was impressed with Cohen's sketches and the sincerity of the rabbi's request. That December, Cohen visited Wright's suite in New York's Plaza Hotel to discuss the plan. Cohen appealed to the architect's sense of patriotism, likening the proposed synagogue to a Jewish ner tamid (eternal flame) and the Statue of Liberty, and Wright informally agreed. Wright said he could begin designing the synagogue immediately, even though he was busy with several other projects, and he advised Cohen: "Send me a few dollars whenever you can".

Wright had never designed a synagogue before, despite having been hired by numerous prominent Jews during the previous six decades. (Note: George M. Goodwin cites Fallingwater, the Meyer May House, the Rosenbaum House, the Samuel Freeman House, and the Zimmerman House as being among the houses that Wright designed for Jewish clients.) Sources disagree on whether he had declined previous synagogue commissions or whether other congregations had refused to hire him. In an article in The Forward, Gavriel D. Rosenfeld suggested that Wright may not have been hired because of anti-Semitic beliefs prior to World War II. By contrast, a National Park Service report said that Wright was not anti-Semitic and that he was willing to design a synagogue, just not one that lacked American elements. Goodwin stated that several Jewish congregations had declined to ask Wright to design their synagogues. According to Goodwin, "Wright did not feel any solidarity with the Jewish people"; instead, the architect took projects for Jews simply because they were wealthy and willing to commission elaborate designs. One of Wright's biographers, Robert McCarter, wrote that Wright believed he could be "an effective designer for all religions" by not giving preference to any religion in particular.

==== Design ====
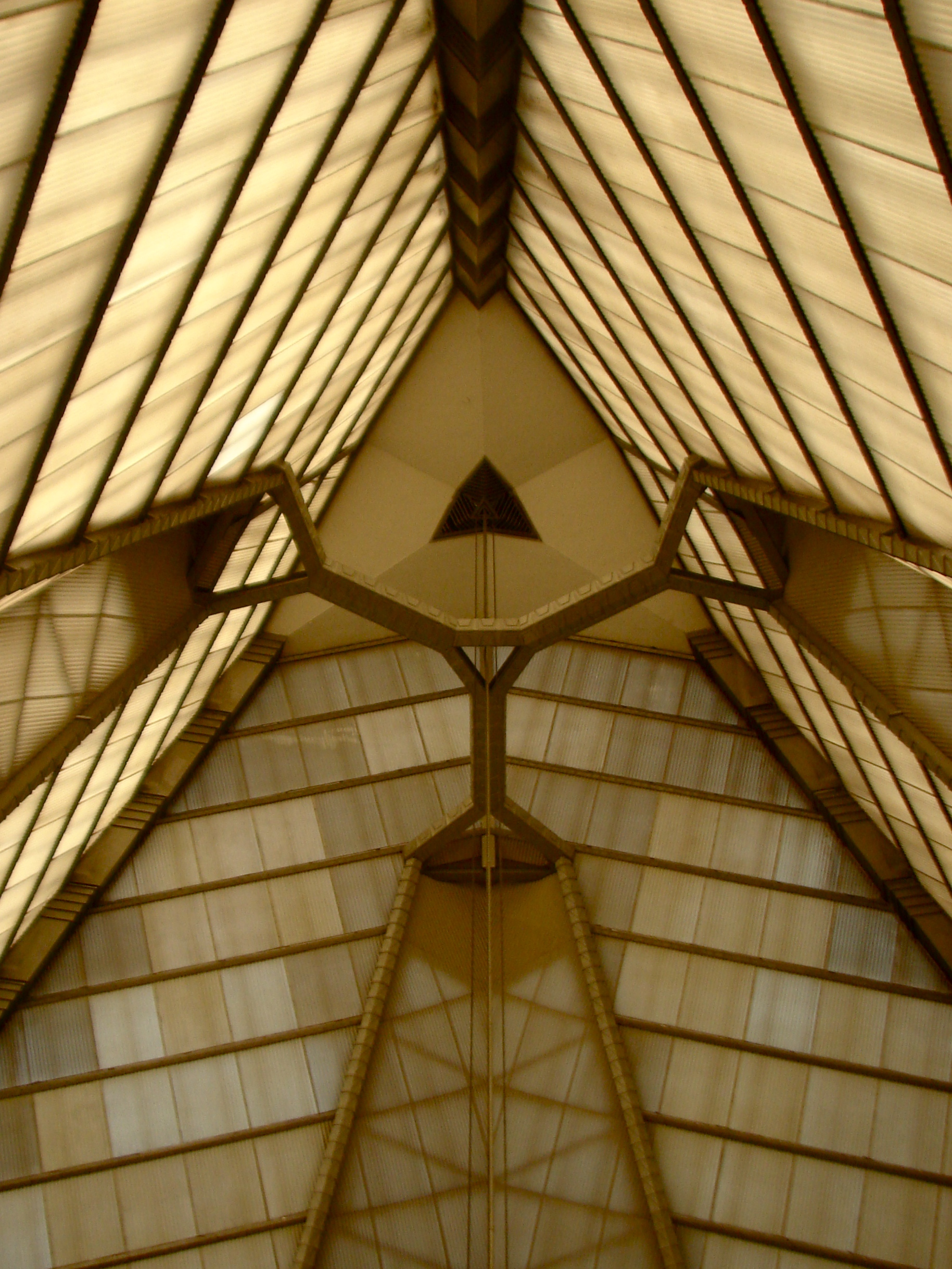
The sanctuary's ceiling

Unlike many contemporary rabbis who had minimal involvement in the design of their synagogues, Cohen suggested various changes to the plan and architectural details. The congregation's board gave Cohen and Wright wide latitude in the synagogue's design. Cohen requested that the synagogue include 1,100 to 1,500 seats in its main sanctuary and another 200 seats in a smaller chapel; this would make the synagogue significantly larger than any of his previous houses of worship. With Cohen's permission, Wright changed the octagonal plan to a hexagonal one, and he modified his original plans for a simplistic entrance canopy to be more elaborate in design. Lewis Heicklen, the congregation's president, also worked with Wright on the development of the new synagogue. Wright showed Cohen the design—a loose representation of the Jewish holy site of Mount Sinai—in February 1954, to which the rabbi replied that the design exuded "beauty and reverence".

Wright submitted seven sketches to Beth Sholom's board in March 1954, proclaiming, "Herewith the promised 'hosanna', a temple that is truly a religious tribute to the living God." The building was to be hexagonal in plan, an allusion to the Star of David. The roof, a three-sided pyramidal dome with protruding lamps representing the menorah of the Tabernacle, would be topped by a copper cap. Inside was to be a 268-seat chapel on the first floor and a 1,214-seat sanctuary on the second floor. The plans were quoted in The Capital Times as being "strong, simple, majestic". Beth Sholom's board of directors was satisfied with the plans, giving Wright an initial payment of $5,000. (Note: About $46,000 in 2024) One point of contention involved the height of the synagogue, whose roof would exceed Elkins Park's 65-foot (20 m) height limit. Despite objections from some local residents, the Cheltenham Township zoning board approved the plans because the roof was classified as a chimney or spire, which was exempt from the height limit. The synagogue was planned to cost either $500,000, $650,000, $750,000, (Note: Gill 1987, p. 467, claims that the cost increased from $500,000 to $750,000 at some point between March and June 1954.) or $800,000. (Note: About $4.62–7.392 million in 2024)

Initially, the congregation was skeptical of Wright because of the plans' cost and because he had never designed a synagogue before. Wright presented the plans to the rest of the congregation that June, and the congregation raised $250,000 the same month. (Note: About $2.31 million in 2024) Wright also suggested that Demchick's annex be demolished and that the new synagogue instead be built on the western side of Old York Road, on the site of the Breyer House. According to Goodwin, Wright may not have known that the synagogue was supposed to face east toward Jerusalem (making it more practical to build a synagogue on the eastern side of the street), or that the congregation's observant Jews preferred to walk to services. In any case, by the end of July, the congregation had raised about $300,000 for the new synagogue. (Note: About $2.772 million in 2024) The Beth Sholom Sisterhood also pledged $50,000 for the construction of a sisterhood sanctuary in the basement. (Note: About $0.462 million in 2024) To raise money for the sisterhood sanctuary, the congregation sold tickets to events where Cohen would review various best-selling books, and the sisterhood hosted the Blossom Festival. Despite Cohen's attempts to get Wright to send him the working drawings for the new synagogue, the architect did not send over the drawings for several months. The township's Board of Adjustment approved the plans in early November 1954.

==== Construction ====
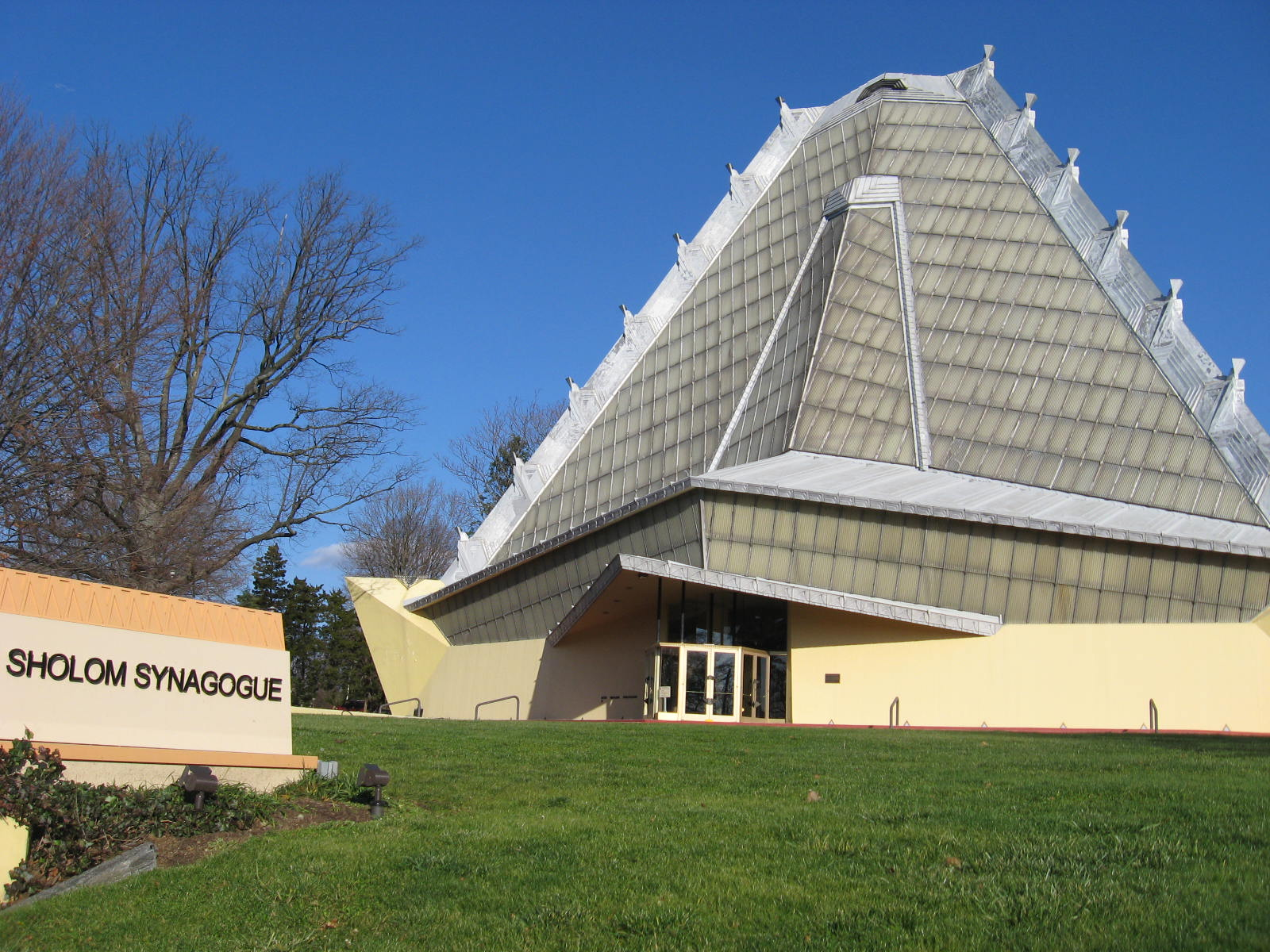
View of the exterior from Old York Road

A groundbreaking ceremony for the new temple took place on November 14, 1954. The construction cost increased significantly due to several changes made during development; the synagogue's records indicate that the general contractor had issued 16 change orders. A modification to the building's shape increased its cost by $30,000, while another modification to reduce glare brought up the costs by another $20,000. (Note: The modification to the building's shape is equivalent to $2.772 million, while the modification to reduce glare is equivalent to $2.31 million, in 2024) The congregation had raised $400,000 for the temple's construction by January 1955 (Note: About $3.645 million in 2024) and raised another $100,000 within two months. (Note: About $0.911 million in 2024) During this time, Cohen traveled to Wright's Arizona studio, Taliesin West, to discuss the plans. The architect continued to adjust the design, and Cohen sent Wright some sketches of the interior, fearing that Wright did not know about aspects of Jewish architecture. In April 1956, the government of Cheltenham Township took over the Breyer House from Beth Sholom; at the time, the Breyer estate was subject to a covenant preventing any non-residential use until 1960.

For over a year after the groundbreaking, construction did not proceed because a contractor had not been selected. Potential bidders had rejected the commission or were unable to submit their bids on time. Several Philadelphia–based firms refused to submit bids because the plans were too intricate, and Beth Sholom's board prohibited the Bornstein family from submitting a bid because of concerns over legal liability. Meanwhile, fundraising for the synagogue had stalled. Haskell Culwell—who had just finished the Price Tower, another structure designed by Wright—built a scale model of the synagogue in early 1956. Haskell Cullwell was hired as the synagogue's general contractor that June, agreeing to build it for $875,000. (Note: About $7.71 million in 2024) Construction formally began shortly thereafter, and Melvin Bricker was appointed to lead the congregation's construction committee.

Wright frequently spent time in New York City, supervising the construction of the Solomon R. Guggenheim Museum, but he and Cohen continued discussing various aspects of the design. The interior design was not completed until 1957, which delayed construction even further, and delays also arose from the discovery of leaks and disagreements over the number of seats. Another dispute surrounded the synagogue's bimah or raised platform; Cohen repeatedly asked Wright to put the bimah in the center of the main sanctuary, as was common in other synagogues, but Wright refused. The construction budget was sometimes nearly exhausted, and work proceeded at such a slow rate that the synagogue was sometimes nicknamed "Cohen's Folly". The congregation was eventually forced to borrow $400,000 from the Beneficial Saving Fund Society, (Note: About $3.405 million in 2024) secured by the assets of 20 wealthy Beth Sholom members. The roof was being constructed by 1958, when the temple's construction was featured in an issue of Architectural Record magazine.

The new synagogue's cornerstone, containing a Torah and several newspapers, was formally laid on December 8, 1958, at which point the cost of the synagogue had increased to $1.5 million. (Note: About $12.473 million in 2024) The exterior had been completed at that time, while the interior was still under construction. Wright made his final visit to the site in January 1959, and Beth Sholom celebrated its 40th anniversary that March. The entire synagogue was supposed to have been dedicated on May 24; the new building was nearly completed except for carpets and chairs. Wright had been invited to speak at the opening, but he died that April. Cohen later wrote that there was "consolation in the knowledge that before he died he had completed his inspired work down to the minutest detail". Taliesin Associated Architects, composed of several of Wright's disciples, oversaw the completion of the synagogue.

=== Late 20th century ===
==== Opening and 1960s ====
The sisterhood sanctuary and the main sanctuary's ark were dedicated on May 13, 1959, before the main sanctuary was completed. Following Wright's death, the congregation decided to postpone the dedication to coincide with the High Holy Days. Some of the male congregants attended a preview event at the new synagogue on September 14, and the synagogue was dedicated on September 20, 1959. Wright's widow Olgivanna Lloyd Wright spoke at the dedication, while U.S. President Dwight D. Eisenhower sent the congregation a celebratory telegram. The synagogue's final cost came to $1.3 million, $1.4 million, or $1.5 million; (Note: About $10.669–12.31 million in 2024) though significant, the budget overrun was typical of Wright's work. Wright's design helped attract new members, many of whom remained in the congregation after moving primary residences elsewhere. The number of families in the congregation had doubled to 900 shortly after the new temple opened. The year after the new synagogue opened, the congregation published a brochure detailing the building's history.

Cohen, who had been the congregation's first and only rabbi for over four decades, retired in 1964, becoming a rabbi emeritus. Aaron Landes was appointed at Beth Sholom's senior rabbi the same year. By then, Beth Sholom was one of ten Jewish congregations around Elkins Park, and its religious school had 125 pupils, a decline from its peak of 600 students. Landes reflected that the congregation often did not have enough people to form a morning minyan of at least ten men, and congregants sometimes had to pay people to join the minyanim. Other Conservative congregations around Elkins Park used Beth Sholom's pool as a mikveh for ritual immersion in Judaism. Flaws soon developed in the new synagogue: for example, the roof leaked, and the original lighting was too dim. As such, the congregation hired a contractor to repair the roof in the late 1960s, and the lighting was also upgraded around that time. Work on an expansion of the synagogue's annex commenced in 1966, and the expansion opened in 1969. The same year, the synagogue held an art exhibition to celebrate the congregation's 50th anniversary.

==== 1970s to 1990s ====
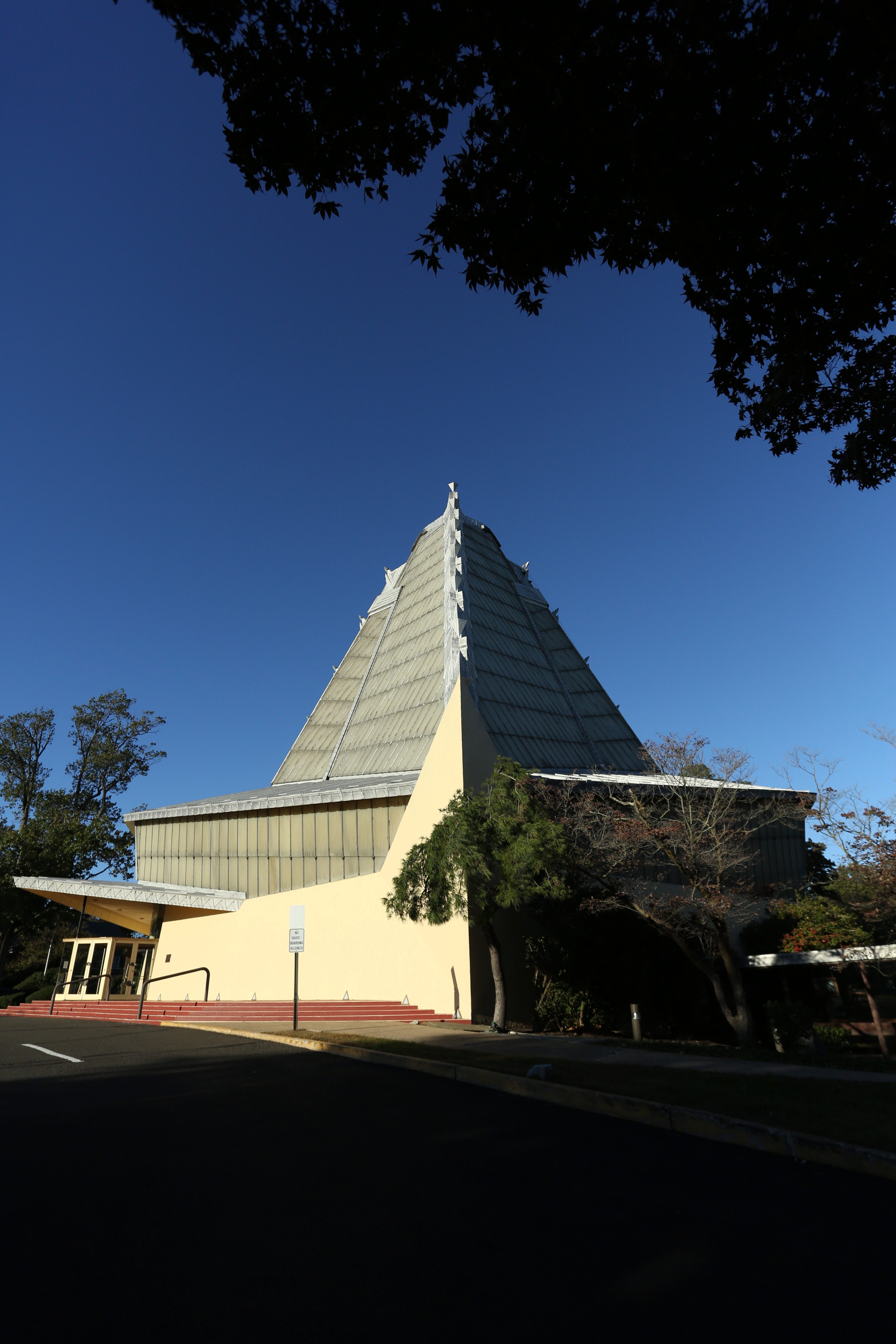
View from the side

Visitors were allowed to tour the building three days a week in the 1970s, although photography was not allowed. In 1978, the West Oak Lane Jewish Community Center was merged into the Beth Sholom Congregation; the 165 families in West Oak's congregation became members of Beth Sholom. By the following decade, tourists could access the interior by appointment only. The synagogue underwent accessibility upgrades in 1986, which included a new ramp, a wheelchair-accessible bathroom, and wheelchair-accessible parking spots. By the late 1980s, the congregation had 1,300 families, a figure that held steady into the next decade. Beth Sholom had 80 staff members at the time, including two assistant rabbis. Landes, who remained Beth Sholom's senior rabbi, was also active as a United States Navy chaplain until 1989, sometimes conducting chaplain duties from Beth Sholom. Landes also helped expand the congregation's religious schools.

By the 1990s, the congregation hosted a daily prayer minyan starting at 7 a.m., with activities continuing into the night. More than a hundred members were involved in its music program, and Beth Sholom's religious schools had hundreds of pupils. About 90% of members' children remained enrolled in the congregation's schools after their bar and bat mitzvahs, at a time when the average retention rate for Jewish schools nationwide was 15%. The congregation also hosted a variety of club meetings and other events, and its $2 million annual operating budget was comparable to those of smaller townships. (Note: About $3.91 million in 2024) The synagogue was also successful as a visitor attraction, with about a thousand tourists each year, some of whom came from as far away as France and Japan. Members of the congregation helped construct an eruv, or halachic enclosure, around Elkins Park in the late 1990s.

=== 21st century ===
==== 2000s and 2010s ====
Historical congregation size (number of families)
Year	Pop.
1917	25
1935	400
Early 1960s	900
Late 1980s	1,300
1990s	1,300
2000	1,200
2004	1,000
2011	850
2020	450
2024	500

Landes retired as the senior rabbi in 2000, and he was succeeded later that year by Gershon Schwartz. At the time of Landes's retirement, he boasted that he had turned the congregation's $1 million debt into a surplus of $5–6 million, and that he had increased the annual operating budget from $400,000 to $2.75 million. In addition, the congregation had 1,200 families with 4,000 people total, and it hosted two minyanim every day of the year. The congregation opened a preschool for infants and toddlers in 2002. Schwartz left the congregation in 2003, and David Glanzberg-Krainin became the senior rabbi the next year. During this time, Beth Sholom raised funds to create a new Sefer Torah scroll. Also in 2004, the congregation of the nearby Temple Sholom merged with the Beth Sholom Congregation; at the time, Beth Sholom had 1,000 families, while Temple Sholom had 200. The preschool was expanded after the closure of the nearby Bayt Yeladeem: Children's House preschool in 2006.

By the 2000s, Jews were no longer moving to the northern suburbs of Philadelphia in large numbers, and membership had declined to 950. The congregation began building a small visitor center in 2007. They hired Venturi, Scott Brown and Associates to design the visitor center. The congregation also began soliciting bids for an elevator, and a secular nonprofit organization was established to operate the synagogue and raise funds. About 5,000 tourists came to the synagogue annually, but until the visitor center opened, non-members had to make advance appointments in order to tour the temple. The visitor center opened in 2009 within one of the synagogue's rooms, coinciding with the temple's 50th anniversary. Several congregants volunteered to serve as docents for the synagogue's visitor center, but this was inadequate, as the Beth Sholom Synagogue Preservation Foundation often invited large groups to visit. The building still needed repairs, having deteriorated over the years: for example, the roof sometimes leaked, the glass panes had to be cleaned, and there was no functioning climate control system.

Membership had declined to 850 families by 2011. The next year, part of the roof was damaged when a tree fell on it during Hurricane Sandy. Shortly afterward, the firm CyArk scanned the synagogue building for preservation purposes, intending to create a scale model using these scans; only some of the scans were publicized due to security concerns following the Sandy Hook Elementary School shooting. Beth Sholom's and the nearby Adath Jeshurun Congregation's high schools were merged in 2013 due to declining enrollment; the two congregations merged their elementary schools with that of Keneseth Israel the next year. To attract Jews not affiliated with any denomination, in 2016, Beth Sholom established the Center for Spiritual Well Being, which hosted events there. The same year, the nearby Congregation Shaare Shamayim considered merging with Beth Sholom before merging with another congregation. Beth Sholom celebrated its own centennial and the building's 60th anniversary in 2019; as part of the celebrations, David Hartt created an interactive artwork for the synagogue.

==== 2020s to present ====
During the COVID-19 pandemic in 2020, Beth Sholom suspended in-person services, instead hosting events online from March 2020 to June 2021. The Beth Sholom Congregation had been reduced to 450 members by the 2020s. This left enough room for Congregation Kol Ami, a Reform Jewish congregation, to move into Beth Sholom Synagogue in 2021. Though the congregations remained separate, with their own offices, they shared usage of the Bornstein Auditorium. The next year, following advocacy from Pennsylvania representative Napoleon Nelson, the synagogue received $2 million from the Pennsylvania Redevelopment Assistance Capital Program to repair its leaking roof. David Glanzberg-Krainin, Beth Sholom's senior rabbi, referred to the synagogue as "Falling Water East" because large amounts of water leaked into the building during rainstorms. Melrose B'nai Israel Emanu-El considered moving into Beth Sholom Synagogue in 2023 but ultimately decided against it.

Kol Ami moved out of Beth Sholom Synagogue in 2024, when it merged with Darchei Noam, another Reform synagogue nearby. The Beth Sholom Congregation had about 500 families by then and was growing. The growth came amid the decline in the surrounding area's proportion of Jewish families and a general trend of attrition at non-Orthodox congregations. Younger Jews accounted for much of the growth, since families with children receive discounted tuition at Beth Sholom's school if they attended several events at the synagogue each year. The congregation also tried to attract families with children, hiring a director of family engagement and creating a lending library for young children during High Holiday services. Concurrently, the congregation began raising money for the ongoing renovation of the synagogue, which included security and accessibility upgrades and an expansion of the outdoor courtyard. By 2025, the Beth Sholom Preservation Foundation had privately raised almost $7 million for repairs, along with $3 million from the state.

== Building ==
Beth Sholom Synagogue is the only synagogue that Wright designed, as well as his only large design in the Philadelphia metropolitan area and one of his two Montgomery County designs alongside Suntop Homes. It is sometimes known as the "Frank Lloyd Wright synagogue". Cohen had asked Wright to combine elements of both American and Jewish culture in the design. Because of the extent of Cohen's contributions to the design, Wright credited Cohen as a co-designer; this was unusual for Wright, whom The Wall Street Journal described as having had a narcissistic reputation. Wright said Cohen had inspired him to design a "'traveling Mount Sinai'—a mountain of light", a comparison also invoked by other reviewers. The synagogue has also been cited as including Mayan Revival, Assyrian, and Japanese architectural elements and trompe-l'œil designs. The design incorporates geometric motifs such as triangles, and its roof has been likened to a Native American teepee.

The design may have been influenced by Wright's unbuilt Steel Cathedral, a pyramidal skyscraper that he designed in 1926 for William Norman Guthrie, the priest of St. Mark's Church in-the-Bowery in New York City. Beth Sholom Synagogue also shares design elements with Rhododendron Chapel, a pyramidal chapel that Wright designed for the Kaufmann family near Fallingwater in 1953. The journalist Brendan Gill cited the entrance passageway of Unity Temple, a Universalist Unitarian house of worship in Oak Park, Illinois, as having possibly influenced the design of the synagogue's entrance. The Gwoździec Synagogue in Ukraine, with its pyramidal roof, is cited as another likely source of inspiration for the design. Two writers for Art Journal, in 1965, described the building as being evocative of Noah's Ark.

=== Site ===
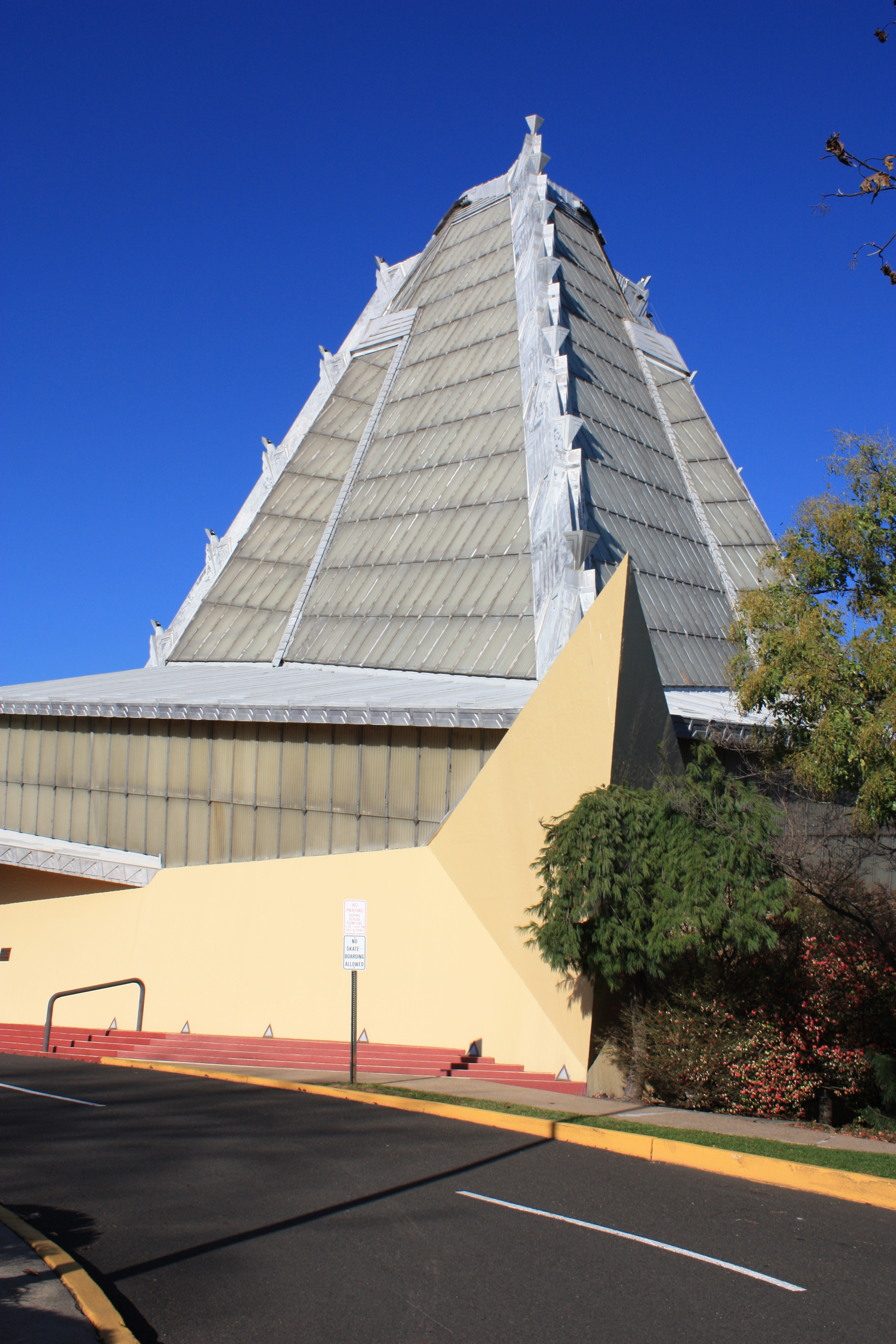
Beth Sholom Synagogue as seen from its driveway

The synagogue is located at 8231 Old York Road (Pennsylvania Route 611) in the unincorporated community of Elkins Park in Cheltenham Township, Pennsylvania, United States. The site covers approximately 4 acres (1.6 ha) slightly north of the Philadelphia border, on the eastern side of Old York Road. Unlike many of Wright's other buildings, which are situated on the sides of hills, Beth Sholom Synagogue sits directly on a hill. The northwest corner contains the synagogue itself, and the site slopes down to the east and south. The site is also bounded to the northwest by Foxcroft Road and to the north, east, and south by other buildings. When the current synagogue was built, Elkins Park included numerous synagogues that had moved there from Philadelphia, in addition to standalone single-family homes.

There is a grass lawn in front of the synagogue to the west. Within the lawn is a concrete fountain with small jets; the fountain, known as a laver, was used for ritual purification. To the east of the fountain is a driveway that runs southward from Foxcroft Road, wrapping around the western side of the main synagogue. The driveway leads to an annex south of the synagogue; a covered walkway connects the two structures. Cohen's original ideas for the site had called for the walkway to be covered with a glass canopy. A portion of the driveway was removed after 1965 to make room for the walkway, which has a flat canopy. There is a parking lot to the east of the synagogue and annex, accessible from either the driveway or directly from Old York Road. Because the parking lot is along the synagogue's rear elevation, congregants who drove there had to enter from the side.

Beth Sholom's annex building is a doughnut-shaped structure composed of two sections: the Sheerr Religious School and the Cross Annex. The older portion of this building is the school (originally the Fischman Memorial Building), which was designed in 1951 by Israel Demchick and constitutes the annex building's western and northern sides. The exterior of the two-story school is made of yellow brick, with metal windows, concrete ornamentation, and a flat roof. Inside were originally classrooms, an auditorium, a swimming pool, a library, a chapel, and shower–locker rooms. The eastern and southern sides, designed in 1969 by Thalheimer & Weitz, have a tan-brick facade with a flat roof. The addition has 25,000 square feet (2,300 m^{2}) across three stories and has additional classrooms, seminar and instruction rooms, offices, a kitchen, a nursery school, and another auditorium.

=== Exterior ===
The synagogue's exterior retains nearly all of its original design and is composed of two sections: a hexagonal base made of glass, steel, and reinforced concrete, and a roof in the shape of a tetrahedron (a pyramid with four triangular faces). The synagogue uses 2,221 cubic yards (1,698 m^{3}) of concrete, which was originally painted a buff color. It also incorporates 2,100 square feet (200 m^{2}) of wire glass, 2,000 square feet (190 m^{2}) of fiberglass, and 4,700 pounds (2,100 kg) of aluminum strips holding the glass and plastic in place. Aluminum-coated triangular panels are used for decoration throughout the facade. The western faces of the building comprise the synagogue's primary elevation, which overlooks Old York Road. The northeastern and southeastern elevations of the base and roof converge to the east, facing Jerusalem (as is typical of Conservative Jewish synagogues).

==== Base ====
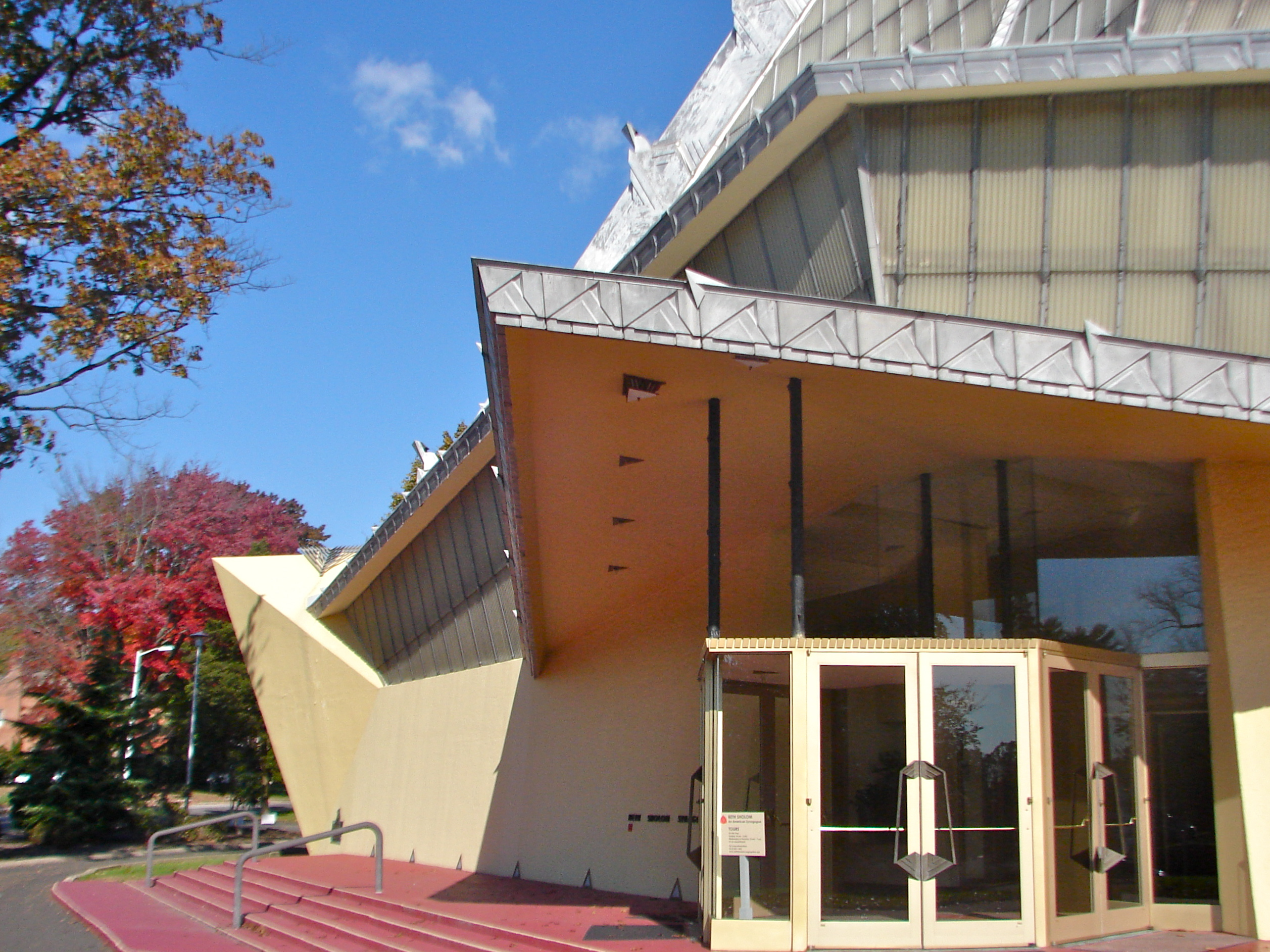
Entrance, looking north

The base is divided into two horizontal sections, corresponding to the two levels inside. The lower section of the base is composed of a beige-colored wall of reinforced concrete, which slants inward toward the roof; a larger portion of the reinforced-concrete wall is visible on the east, where the site slopes down. The floor plan is similar to that of an equilateral triangle, with shallow bevels at the centers of the western, northeastern, and southeastern sides, which give it the shape of a hexagon. There are rhombus-shaped decorations protruding from the base's eastern, northwestern, and southwestern corners; these serve as supports for the roof beams. The northwestern and southwestern corners also have menorah-style lamps.

The main entrance is underneath the facade's western bevel. A stoop with five red-concrete steps leads up to a concrete landing, which is illuminated by triangular lamps along the bottom of the facade. The entrance itself consists of two sets of protruding bronze-and-glass doors, whose handles have triangular motifs. The doors flank two narrow support columns, above which is a protruding triangular canopy. Wright described the canopy as signifying "the hands of the rabbi offering a benediction to his congregation as they enter the temple"; this is based on Cohen's suggestion that the canopy's design be evocative of ancient priests' hands.

The upper section of the base was intended to visually connect the reinforced-concrete walls below and the roof above. The portion immediately above the concrete lower section is coated with glazed panels. An aluminum band separates the upper section of the base from the roof. As designed, the roof of the base's upper section was to be made of bronze-painted cast aluminum.

==== Roof ====
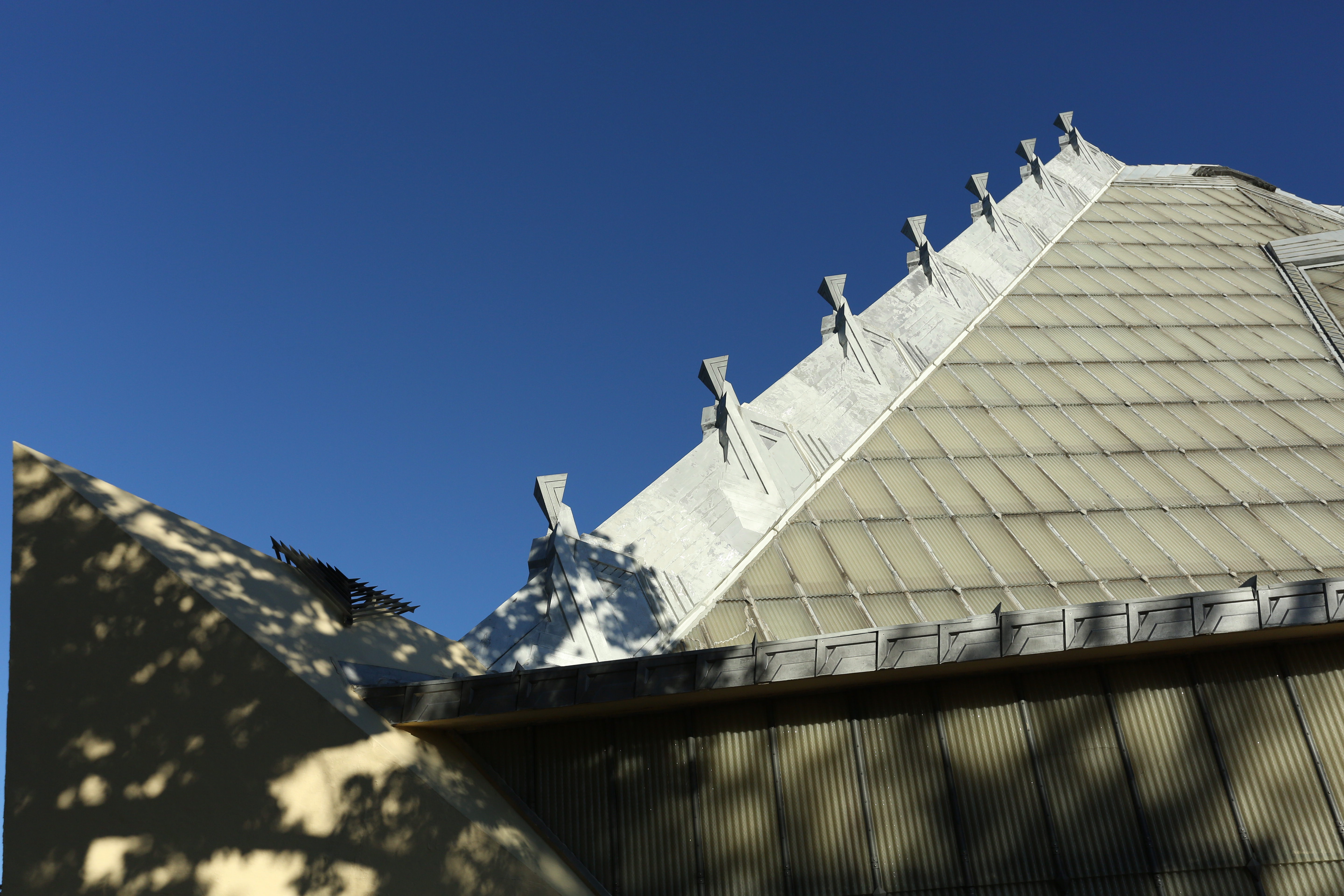
Roof detail

The roof is about 100 feet (30 m) tall. It is composed of a set of panels suspended between three steel and concrete beams, which form a tripod shape in a manner resembling a tent. The beams' length is cited as either 110 feet (34 m) or 117 feet (36 m). Although the beams appear to meet at the roof, they do not actually touch; instead, a triangle connects all three beams. Each beam is decorated with seven menorah-style lamps, each with seven arms. The beams themselves are sometimes cited as symbolizing the three Abrahamic patriarchs: Abraham, Isaac, and Jacob. The roof was intended to resemble Mount Sinai, where the Hebrew prophet Moses received the Ten Commandments from God, and it also evoked the shape of a tent. Cohen had proposed mounting a red aviation obstruction light above the roof, but Wright had rejected this idea. The synagogue was ultimately built with an aluminum cap, which, as planned, bore the inscription "I am the Lord thy God" in Hebrew letters.

The roof panels themselves are composed of an inner layer of corrugated plastic and an outer layer of wire glass, built to withstand 40 pounds per square inch (280 kPa) of wind pressure. The two layers are separated by an 5-inch (130 mm) air gap. The double layering not only deflected glare from the sun but also allowed for easier ventilation during the summer and heat absorption during the winter. The panels were intended to be similar in appearance to acrylic and fiberglass panels, which were commonplace in the 1950s. Though there are rumors that the original panels were replaced with acrylic due to sonic booms from military aircraft flying nearby, these rumors have not been substantiated. The roof panels are mounted onto grids of tall, narrow metal rectangles. The centers of the western, northeastern, and southeastern facades have protruding bevels, which are composed of vertical metal bars that converge at a decorative metal panel. The roof is lit at night by the interior lighting.

=== Interior ===
The interior is hexagonal in plan, measuring 175 feet (53 m) wide. The hexagonal shape is similar to the floor plan used in some of Wright's other work, such as Florida Southern College's Anne Pfeiffer Chapel, the Hanna–Honeycomb House, and the First Unitarian Society of Madison. However, Beth Sholom Synagogue differs from these buildings in that it does not use a regular hexagon. The northern and southern halves of the interior are symmetrical to one another, and the space is divided across two levels. In addition to the main sanctuary on the second floor, there is a smaller Sisterhood Sanctuary, a suite for marriage ceremonies, and assembly rooms for men and women on the first floor.

Wright designed all of the synagogue's original furniture, acquiring materials based on whether they were cost-effective; many of the original finishes remain intact. The woodwork inside the synagogue is made of stained walnut, which is tinted golden-tan and brown, and the metalwork and concrete are painted gray. The sanctuaries have buff-colored carpets—which were intended to evoke The Exodus, the Israelites' 40-year journey through the desert—while the remaining rooms have red-tiled floors. The spaces are illuminated by triangular bronze sconces on the walls, in addition to lights suspended from the ceiling. Wright's houses of worship typically included fireplaces, and he incorporated two fireplaces into Beth Sholom Synagogue's design.

==== Vestibules ====
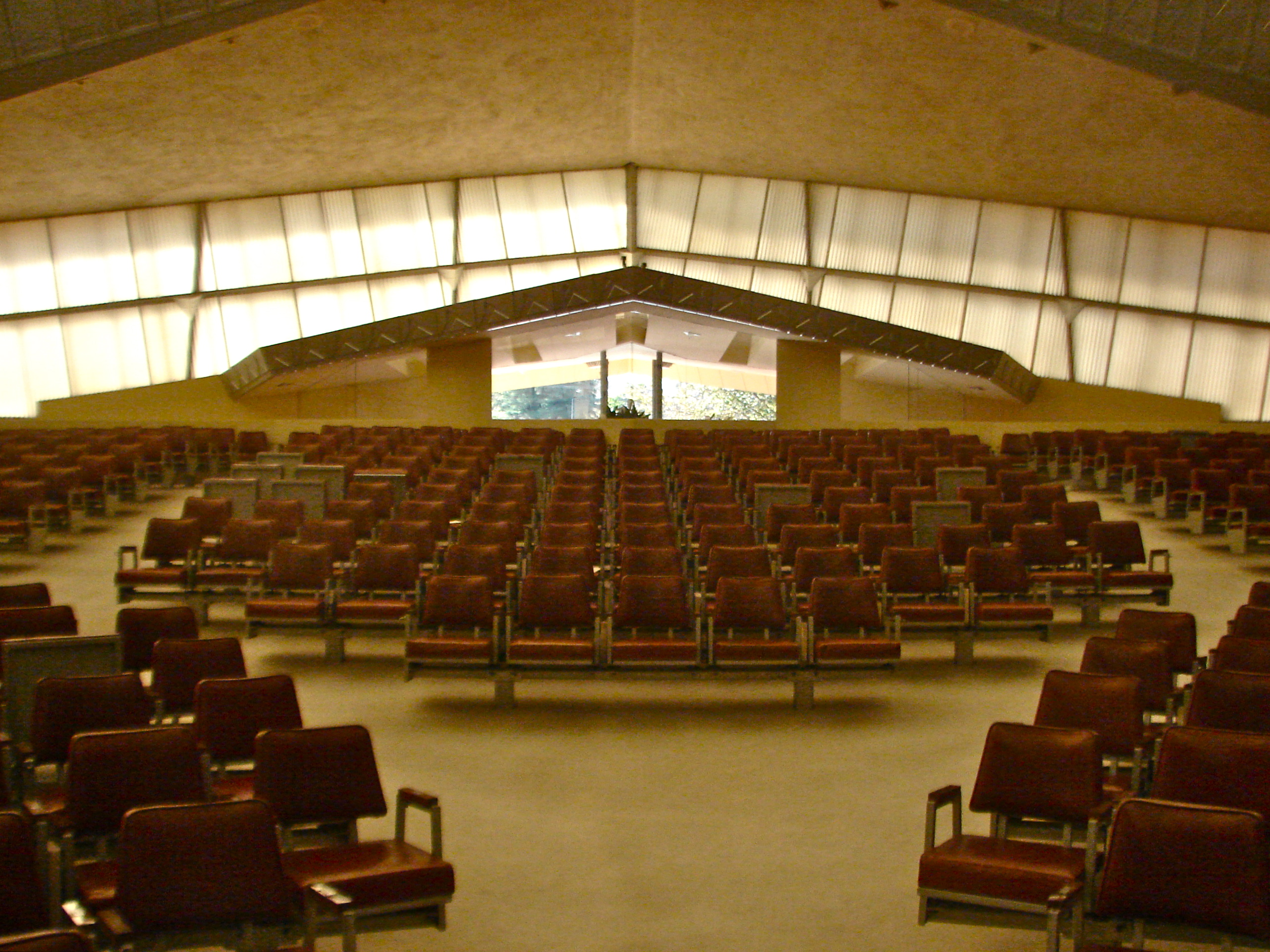
Westward view from the main sanctuary, looking toward the vestibules and main entrance

The synagogue has two vestibules; both have red linoleum floors with triangular light fixtures, and their walls are clad with plaster. There are aluminum handrails and wooden planters with geometric decorations. Due to the orientation of the building, both of the vestibules can be seen directly from the main sanctuary. During sunset, light shines directly into the vestibules and the main sanctuary beyond it.

The western elevation's entrance leads to the outer vestibule, the Harold L. Neuman Memorial Foyer, which has glazed doors leading to stairs on either side. The stairs ascend to the main sanctuary, with ceilings that slope upward toward the sanctuary. These stairs had been planned as ramps, but the design was changed due to a lack of available space. Another set of bronze-and-glass doors leads east from the Neuman Foyer to the inner vestibule, known as the Rabbi Mortimer J. Cohen Foyer. Doors on either side of the Cohen Foyer lead to separate lounges for men and women. A stairway, with rhombus patterns, leads straight down to the sisterhood chapel in the basement. There is also a visitor center within a former reception room. Spanning about 1,400 square feet (130 m^{2}), it contains multimedia exhibits and a documentary about the synagogue narrated by Leonard Nimoy.

==== Main sanctuary ====
The main sanctuary, a high-ceilinged space accessed by the staircases, occupies nearly all of the synagogue's first floor. Unlike traditional houses of worship, the sanctuary lacks columns, aisles, traditional pews, or spires. The floor slopes down from the staircases' upper landings toward the center of the room. The main sanctuary has more than a thousand seats, (Note: The main sanctuary is variously cited as containing either 1,026, 1,030, 1,040, or 1,051 seats. Other sources give significantly different figures of 1,130 or 1,250 seats.) which have orange upholstery and aluminum frames These seats are arranged into three geometrical zones, with a central group of seats flanked by additional seats to the north and south. In contrast to other Orthodox congregations, the seating is mixed-gender, and adults and children are not segregated. Wright intended for the layout to give the impression that the congregation was cupped in God's hands, and the seating layout also gave congregants an "awareness of the whole" by allowing uninterrupted views across the sanctuary. Wright had wanted to minimize echoes in the sanctuary; though this allowed people to sit in "peaceful silence" (as his widow Olgivanna described it), it was not ideal for congregational use, since congregants often sang and prayed loudly.

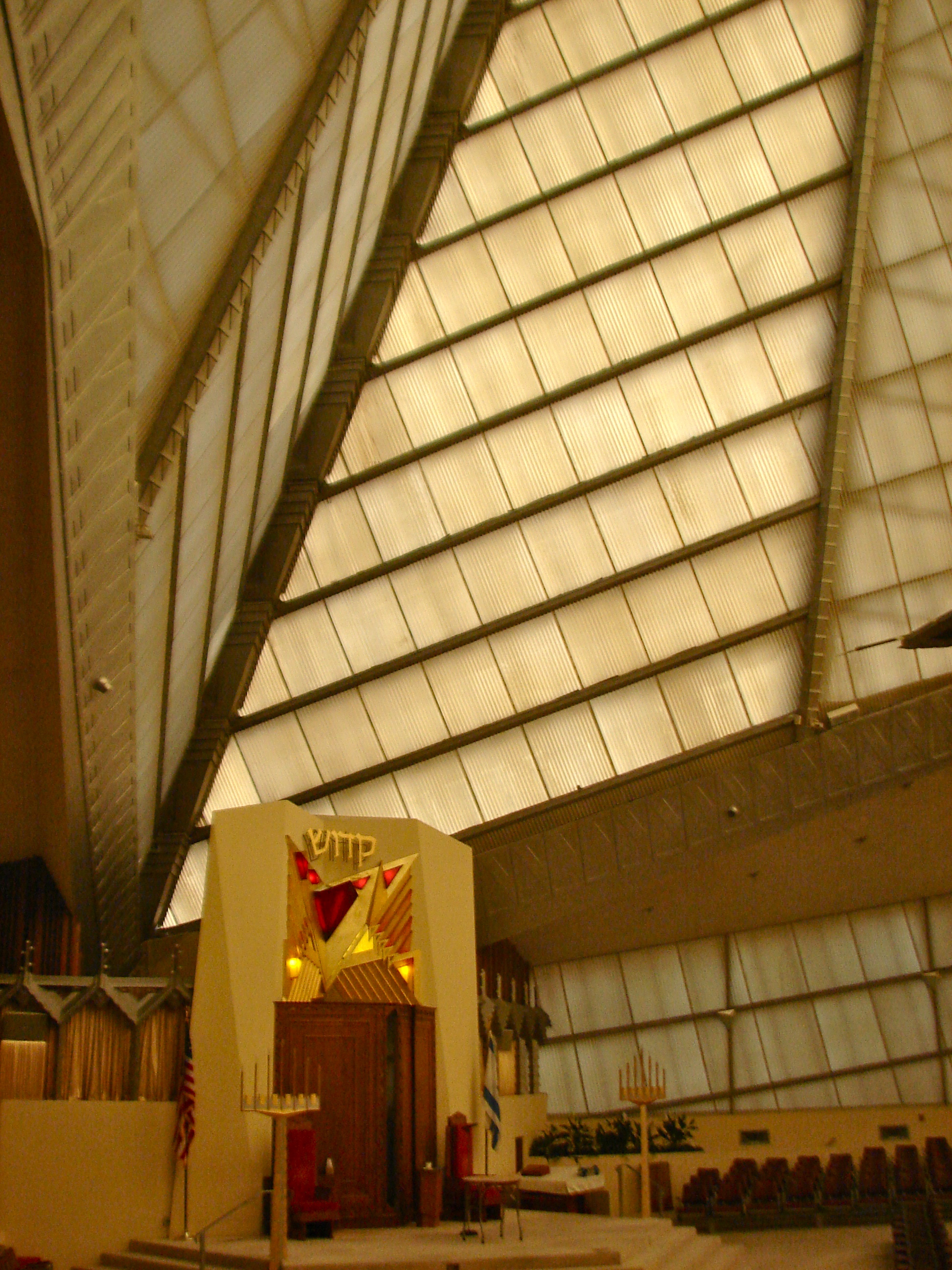
The main sanctuary's ark

Cohen had wanted the sanctuary to include a central bimah, as was common in synagogue architecture. Instead Wright ultimately relegated the bimah to one end of the room; though the bimah could be moved to the center of the room, but this would require seats to be disassembled. As built, the seats face the bimah at the sanctuary's eastern end. The bimah has several chairs, lecterns, and menorahs, in addition to a Torah ark, all of which were designed by Wright. Due to halakhic (Jewish rabbinical) restrictions, the ark was required to be accessed by at least three steps, and the ark was not allowed to be made of metal, since that material signified war. Instead, the ark was made of black granite from Pennsylvania, with golden specks throughout. The Torah ark is decorated with golden and red angels' wings and, as originally planned, was supposed to have enough space for twelve Torahs. As built, the ark can fit ten Torahs, one for each of the Ten Commandments. Above the ark is a lamp with flame-shaped motifs, which was designed by Wright. The lamp bears the word kadosh, which means "holy", in Hebrew letters. Flanking the ark are half-height partition walls with decorative screens above them. The rabbi's study and the organ loft are located behind the walls; the organ was salvaged from the Breyer House.

The sanctuary's ceiling slopes up from each corner toward the center of the room. At the sanctuary's northwestern and southeastern corners, beneath the bases of the roof's support beams, are pyramidal decorations that contain walnut plaques with flame-shaped motifs. The support beams themselves are decorated with aluminum panels that have triangular motifs. The gold-plated ceiling is supported by the beams; the lights in the ceiling are arranged in the shape of a star of David. Suspended from the center of the building's pinnacle is a stained-glass chandelier shaped like an inverted triangle. The chandelier's design was influenced by a telephone conversation between Bricker and Wright, who spent an hour adjusting the design until they agreed on how the chandelier's glass wedges should be positioned. The chandelier, along with the ark, are the only large objects in the synagogue with significant amounts of bright colors, as Wright wanted the natural colors of the sky to be visible.

==== Lower levels ====
The first floor of the synagogue contains the Sisterhood Sanctuary. When the synagogue was completed, the Sisterhood Sanctuary contained either 250 or 268 seats. The Sisterhood Sanctuary has a rhombus shape, with copper-toned leather seats on a sloped floor, facing the sanctuary's bimah. The bimah itself has aluminum panels and sits beneath a suspended ner tamid or sanctuary lamp. There is also a coved ceiling with recessed lamps, as well as triangular lamps throughout the rest of the ceiling. The chapel was planned with a smaller ark that could fit up to a half-dozen Torahs. All of the furniture in the Sisterhood Sanctuary was designed by Wright. The Sisterhood Sanctuary lacks windows and is surrounded entirely by concrete walls, which support the main sanctuary above.

The Robin Lounge is to the north of the Sisterhood Sanctuary, accessed by stairs from the Cohen Foyer, while the Presidents' Lounge to the south is nearly identical and is also reached by stairs from the Cohen Foyer. Both lounges have fireplaces in their corners, as well as floors made of red linoleum; the Presidents' Lounge also connects with a storage space, which was originally a kitchen. Under the first floor is a cellar with mechanical equipment, which is located 25 feet (7.6 m) below street level.

== Uses ==
=== Staff and notable members ===
As of 2025, Beth Sholom Synagogue's senior rabbi is David Glanzberg-Krainin, who has served in this capacity since 2004. Its senior cantor since 2020 has been Jacob Agar. Danielle Otero is the synagogue's executive director, having held this position since 2023. In addition, David F. Tilman is hazzan emeritus; Harvey Friedrich is executive director emeritus; and Yaacov B. Lieberman is ritual director emeritus. Since its founding, Beth Sholom has had the following senior rabbis:

Rabbi	Start year	End year	Refs.
Mortimer J. Cohen	1920	1964	
Aaron Landes	1964	2000	
Gershon Schwartz	2000	2003	
Andrea Merow	2004	c. 2020–2021	(Note: For Andrea Merow's departure date: In 2020, Merow was described as one of Beth Sholom's rabbis.; By 2021, Merow was described as having been appointed to the Jewish Center of Princeton.)
David Glanzberg-Krainin	2004	present	

The screenwriter Adam F. Goldberg attended Beth Sholom Synagogue as a child, and he was enrolled in its religious school. Josh Shapiro, the Governor of Pennsylvania, has also attended the synagogue since he was a child and remained a member after becoming the state's governor in 2022. University of Pennsylvania Law School dean Bernard Wolfman and his family are all members of Beth Sholom Congregation. In addition, Seymour Schwartzman served as the congregation's cantor from 1956 to 1966.

=== Services and programs ===
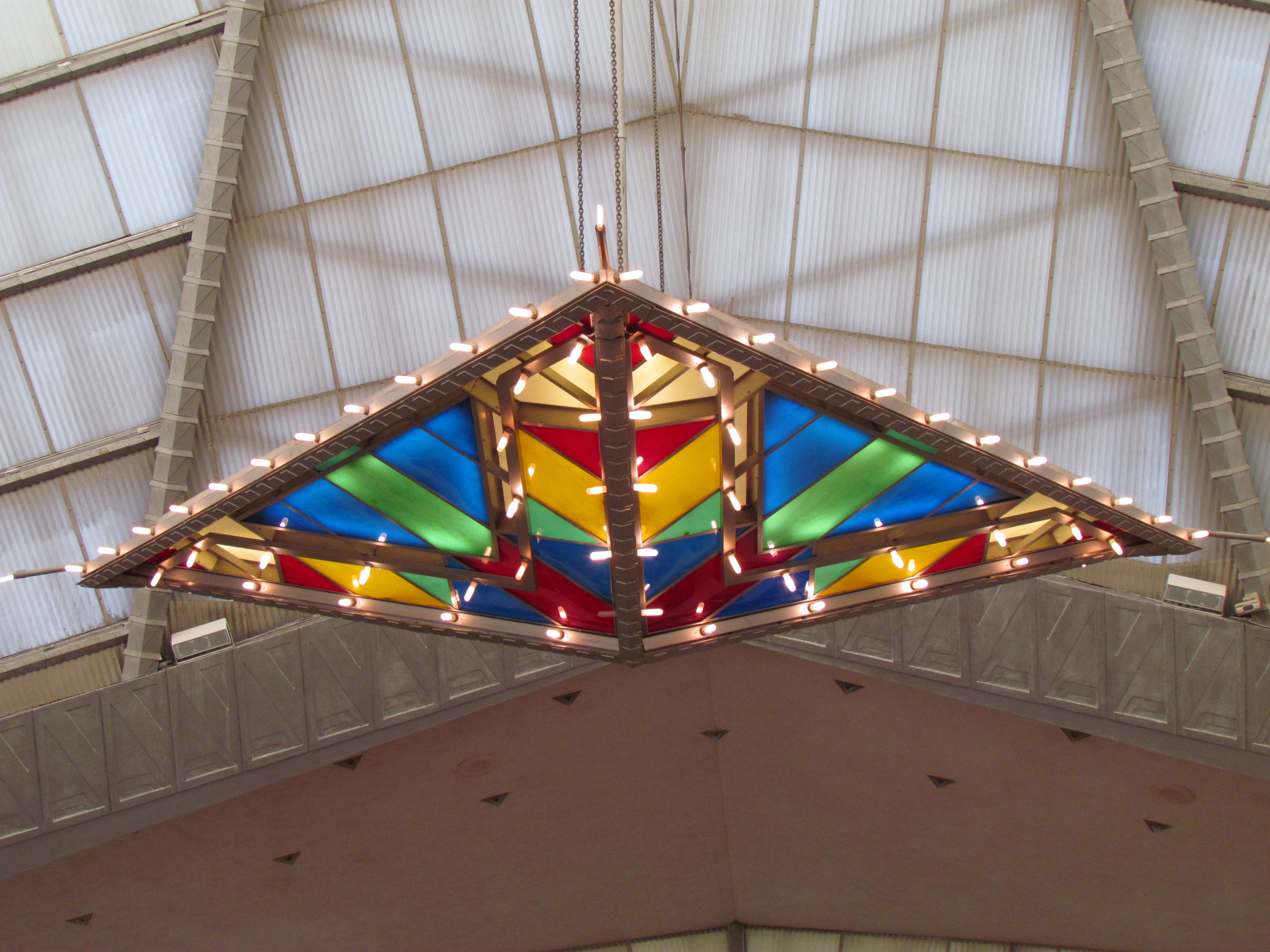
Chandelier in the main sanctuary

Beth Sholom Synagogue continues to house a Conservative congregation, which hosts most of its services in the Sisterhood Sanctuary. As of 2022, Beth Sholom hosted small services on Friday evenings and larger services on Saturday mornings. Members have donated various objects (such as pieces of silver) to commemorate family or friends, and they have donated Torah scrolls as well. The congregation also owns a lithograph by Marc Chagall, a 17th-century megillah, and ancient Israeli artifacts.

The Beth Sholom Congregation also has a preschool and a religious school. Non-Jews can also enroll in the preschool, which provides Mandarin Chinese instruction in addition to Hebrew courses. The synagogue hosts events throughout the year, Throughout the years, the synagogue has hosted group meetings for the congregation's sisterhood and men's club, in addition to prayer services and adult education courses. Other events have included an annual Sukkot festival, theatrical performances, a film festival, an a cappella competition, and a comedy show. The synagogue's events have been attended by special guests such as Chagall, the writer and activist Elie Wiesel, the journalist Barbara Walters, and the actor Leonard Nimoy.

Beth Sholom established a Young Married Council in 1956, which offered free memberships to members' children who got married; by the 1990s, the council was the congregation's fastest-growing group, with 300 families. In the late 20th century, Beth Sholom also started hosting a program dedicated to adult bar and bat mitzvahs and an informal study group at congregants' houses. It gave loans to other Jews through a free loan society, established by Landes and Bernard Granor in 1984. The synagogue has a soup kitchen, and the Mitzvah Food Project operates a food bank there. Other organizations at the synagogue have included the Center for Spiritual Well Being, which runs outreach programs for non-affiliated Jews, and the Bernard Wolfman Civil Discourse Project, which hosts debates on various topics.

In 2007, the Beth Sholom Congregation formed a nonprofit organization to maintain the temple. This became the Beth Sholom Synagogue Preservation Foundation, a secular organization, which runs the synagogue's visitor center. The foundation gives tours of the synagogue several days a week, for a fee.

== Commentary and impact ==
=== Reception ===
==== Contemporary ====
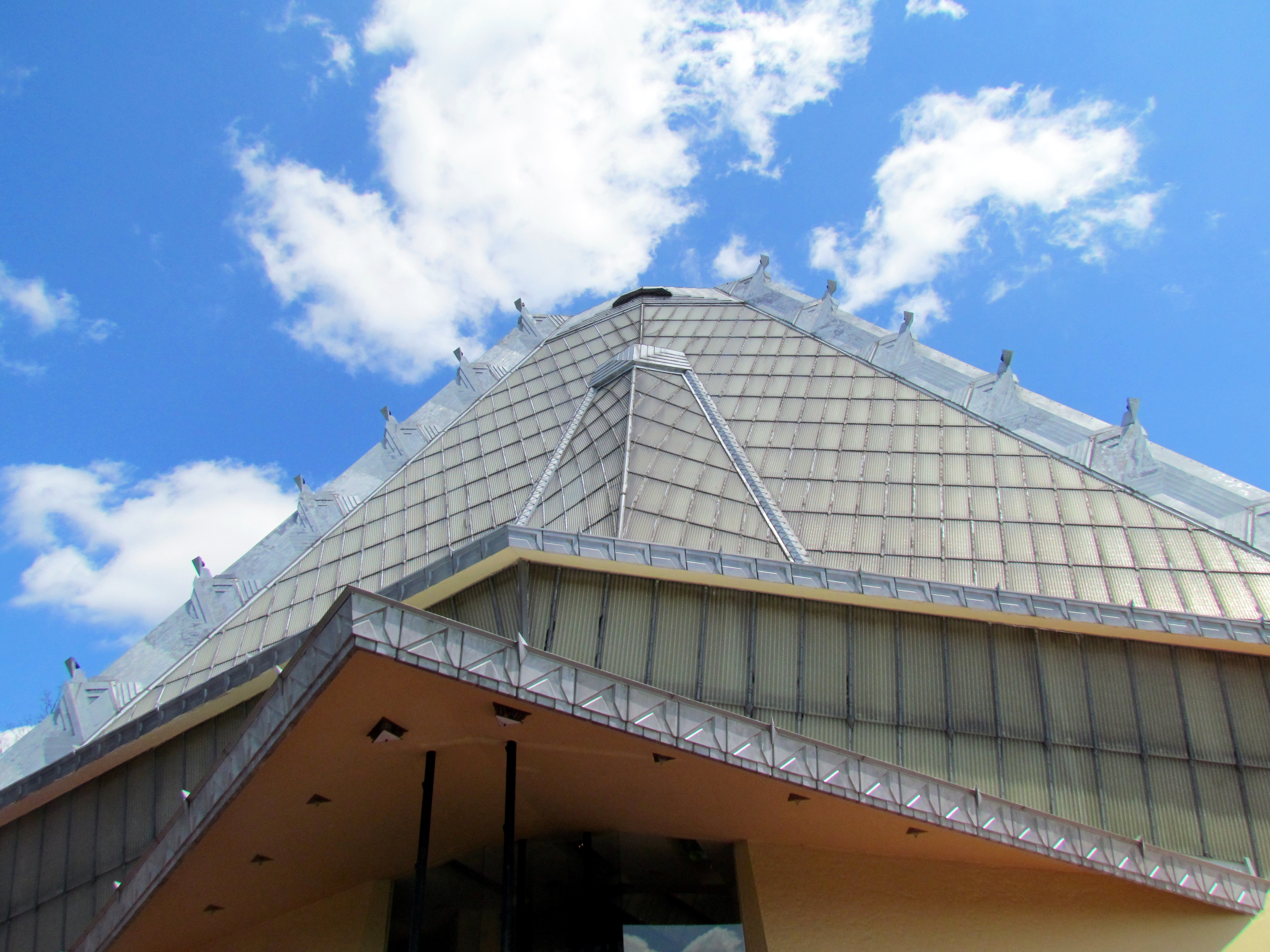
View of the roof from the entrance

During the construction of Beth Sholom's Elkins Park synagogue, it was the subject of articles in magazines such as Architectural Forum, Time, and Life. After the plans were announced in 1954, Time magazine predicted that Beth Sholom Synagogue would become an "architectural monument" for American Jews. Wright biographer Edgar Kaufmann Jr., the son of Fallingwater owner Edgar J. Kaufmann, described the design as "a prism of light, a rock of strength, joyous and austere at once" in a 1957 article for Art in America. Conversely, one of Cohen's acquaintances had written to the rabbi after the synagogue's groundbreaking ceremony, calling the synagogue a show of egotism.

When the Elkins Park synagogue opened, Philip Rudin of the Wisconsin Jewish Chronicle wrote that Elkins Park had become "a particular point of interest of all American Jews" as a result. An unidentified Reform rabbi, cited in The New York Times, described Beth Sholom Synagogue as "probably as atypical a Jewish symbol as one could conjure up". The Jewish Exponent cited two Russian architects as having called the building "a brilliant example of the genius of Wright", and a writer for the South China Morning Post described the synagogue as a deviation from Wright's organic-architecture principles. In 1960, the American Institute of Architects listed Beth Sholom Synagogue as one of seventeen examples of Wright's contribution to American culture. Not everyone liked the completed design; Rudin wrote that he had heard a Zionist leader refer it as a "monstrosity", and a reviewer for Newsweek called it "a masterful but absurd theatrical bivouac that seems to make Jehovah a Wellsian space deity". Ada Louise Huxtable of The New York Times described the building as "gaudy theatricalism", much like many of Wright's other later projects.

==== Retrospective ====
Despite the large amount of information available on Wright and his architecture, the synagogue has received less attention than his other work; for instance, one of his biographers neglected to mention the temple entirely, and a second biographer devoted a single paragraph to the synagogue. According to a National Park Service report, the lack of coverage was not because the building was insignificant, but because synagogue architecture in general was poorly represented in scholarly work. Among Wright biographers who did discuss the synagogue, Brendan Gill said the building was "the Guggenheim's equal as a work of art and far surpasses it as a work of architecture", while Joseph Siry wrote that Wright had created a monumental building in the "modernist tradition of structural poetics". Robert McCarter wrote in 1997 that the design "demonstrate[s] Wright's unmatched capacity to transform ritual into space and experience", and he later called it one of several Wright designs that were "among the greatest monuments of architectural history". The New Yorker's architecture critic Paul Goldberger called the building "magnificent" and "exhilarating", bemoaning the fact that it was not more famous. By contrast, other critics viewed Beth Sholom and Wright's later work disdainfully.

There has also been religious commentary on the synagogue and its architecture. Commentary magazine wrote in 1992 that Beth Sholom had become "one of America's most celebrated pieces of Jewish architecture", in part because of its distinctive design. Inside magazine described Wright and Cohen as having "created a mountain of light for Jews in the desert of suburbia". The scholar Sam Gruber regarded Beth Sholom Synagogue and Temple Gemiluth Chessed in Mississippi as two of the United States' most noteworthy synagogue buildings, despite signifying "two different aspects of the American Jewish experience". Commentators also described the synagogue's design as emblematic of Jews' success in the local area and their integration into American culture. A writer for The Jewish Exponent said in 1979 that the grand design of the synagogue was a culmination of a trend that started when "the Jewish people became increasingly integrated into the mainstream of society of this country". Another writer, for American Jewish History, said that Beth Sholom's design was part of a trend of post–World War II synagogue architects "creating new symbols".

The critic Herbert Muschamp wrote in 1994 that the Beth Shalom Synagogue was one of several Wright designs that had helped slow down the trend of suburbanization, along with works such as the Guggenheim Museum and the Marin County Civic Center. The next year, Thomas Hine wrote for the Philadelphia Inquirer said that the beauty of Wright's design lay in its shape and called it "a building that fuses 1950s highway-strip elements with a timeless spirituality". Other writers compared the synagogue to a concrete ship or a teepee with fins, and the synagogue has also been likened to "Mount Sinai, a glowing ark, and a giant fish". A writer for The Forward magazine wrote in 2021 that Beth Sholom Synagogue "simultaneously evokes Mayan ruins, a Japanese pagoda and Mount Sinai, while creating a wholly new form". Conversely, David Gelernter wrote that the temple is "a tour de force—as a building, but not as a synagogue", in part because Wright's stubbornness led him to disregard the congregation's requests for common synagogue features such as a central bimah.

=== Architectural influence, media, and landmark designations ===
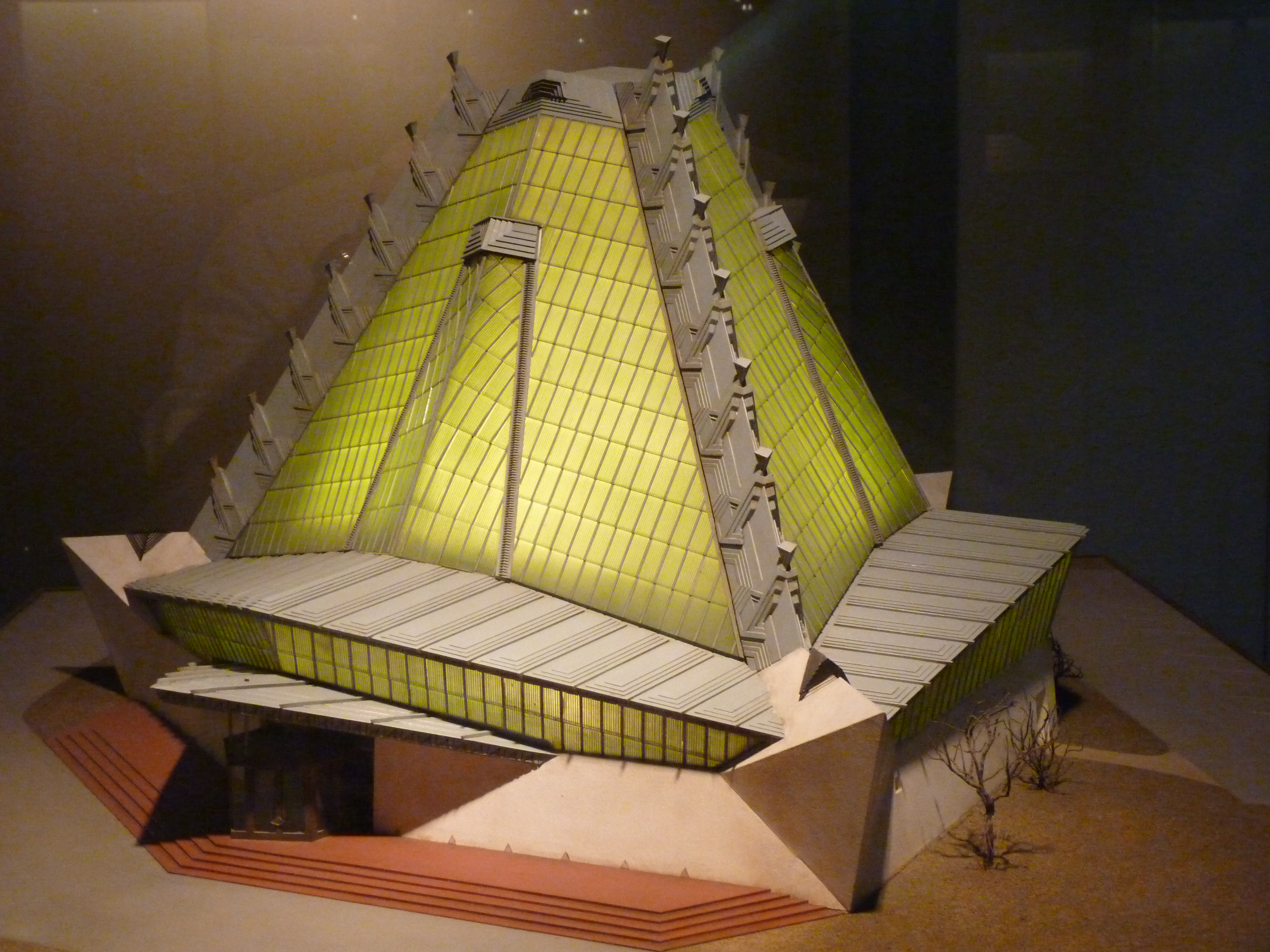
A model of the synagogue is on display at Anu – Museum of the Jewish People in Tel Aviv.

Beth Sholom's sanctuary and its geometric design was the model for that of Temple Beth Sholom in East Hills, New York, designed by Percival Goodman. The synagogue was one of 13 American houses of worship, and the only Jewish building, featured in PBS's 2005 documentary America's Houses of Worship. To mark the temple's 50th anniversary, the filmmaker James Sanders and the designer Alison Cornyn created a documentary about the synagogue in 2009, An American Synagogue. Wright biographer Joseph Siry wrote an essay about the synagogue for the 2009 book Frank Lloyd Wright: From Within Outward, and in 2012 Siry published Beth Sholom Synagogue: Frank Lloyd Wright and Modern Religious Architecture, a book detailing the synagogue's development and Wright's religious projects at large. The congregation's own archives include over 500 pieces of correspondence relating to the synagogue's construction. These documents have been collated into seven or nine volumes.

Shortly after the Elkins Park synagogue was completed, the United States Information Agency displayed a model of the synagogue in an exhibition about Wright's work in Milan. Another model of Beth Sholom Synagogue is displayed in the Anu – Museum of the Jewish People in Tel Aviv, as part of a permanent exhibition of 18 models of historical synagogues from different centuries. Yet another model of the synagogue was displayed in New York's Museum of Modern Art in 1994.

The synagogue was designated as a National Historic Landmark (NHL) in 2007. At the time, it was one of four synagogues nationwide to hold NHL status, which was granted only to buildings with outstanding historical significance nationally. (Note: The other three were Central Synagogue and Eldridge Street Synagogue in New York City, and St. Thomas Synagogue in the U.S. Virgin Islands. Temple Aaron was later added in 2023.) The congregation supported the landmark designation, since they believed that the designation would help attract visitors. In 2008, the Pennsylvania Historical and Museum Commission installed a historic marker at the synagogue, describing the building's historic and architectural significance. Although some of Wright's buildings were nominated as World Heritage Sites in 2011, (Note: Eight buildings were later designated under the title "The 20th-Century Architecture of Frank Lloyd Wright".) Beth Sholom Synagogue was not nominated for World Heritage status, for reasons that were not publicly disclosed.

== See also ==
- Jewish history in Pennsylvania
- List of Frank Lloyd Wright works
- List of National Historic Landmarks in Pennsylvania
- List of synagogues in the United States
- National Register of Historic Places listings in Montgomery County, Pennsylvania
