= Goren (surname) =

Goren is a surname. Notable people with the surname include:

- Ari Goren, pseudonym of Arik Einstein, Israeli musician
- Arthur A. Goren, scholar and professor of American Jewish history
- Carine Goren, Israeli chef, author, and television personality
- Charles Goren, American bridge player, writer, and advocate
- Henry Goren, American photojournalist, videographer, cinematographer, and documentary film director
- Lee Goren, Canadian hockey player
- Lilly Goren, American political scientist and historian
- Naama Goren-Inbar, Israeli archaeologist and paleoanthropologist
- Or Goren (born 1956), Israeli basketball player
- Ran Goren, Israeli fighter pilot and Major General of the IDF
- Rowby Goren, American comedy author
- Shlomo Goren, former Ashkenazi Chief Rabbi of Israel
- Shmuel Goren (1928–2025), Israeli military officer
- Shosha Goren, Israeli actress, playwright, and comedian
- Shraga Goren (1897–1972), Israeli politician
- Yitzhak Goren, Egyptian-born Israeli writer
- Yoav Goren, Israeli-American musician

== Fictional characters ==
- Robert Goren, a character in the television series Law & Order: Criminal Intent

== See also ==
- Gören, Turkish surname
