= Liz Johnson Artur =

Ghanaian-Russian photographer

- Born: 1964 (age 61–62); Bulgaria
- Education: Royal College of Art
- Known for: Photography; Street photography Editorial photography Commercial photography
- Movement: Contemporary art
- Website: lizjohnsonartur.co.uk

Liz Johnson Artur (born 1964) is a Ghanaian-Russian photographer based in London, England. Her work documents the lives of black people from across the African Diaspora. Her work strives to display and celebrate the normal, the vibrant and the subtle nuances of each of these people lives that she encounters. Johnson Artur works as a photojournalist and editorial photographer for various fashion magazines and record labels all over the world, as well as her independent artistic practice. Her monograph with Bierke Verlag was included in the "Best Photo Books 2016" list of The New York Times.

== Early life ==
=== Childhood ===
Liz Johnson Artur was born in Bulgaria but grew up in Eastern Europe and Germany. Her father was Ghanaian and she was raised by her Russian mother. She says that she is "a product of Migration". She lived in West Germany for three months with her mother on a tourist visa before it expired; then they lived as illegal immigrants. Johnson Artur spent most of her days on the streets unable to go to school due to her status. This was when her initial encounters with strangers occurred; "What I most remember about this time is the pleasure I got from meeting strangers on the street, I think this has affected me as a photographer in a big way."

=== Introduction to photography ===
In 1985, Johnson Artur got her first camera and began taking photos during a trip to New York City. During this trip, she stayed with a Russian family in a black neighbourhood in Brooklyn. In an interview with The Fader, she said: "I'd never been in a black neighbourhood before and I didn't take any pictures then. But my memory of what I saw made me want to start taking pictures." This began her journey to take and compile photographs of weddings, parties, church and everyday life.

In an interview with i-D Magazine, Johnson Artur explained that she got into photography because she "wanted to record the normality of black lives and black culture, which is something that isn't often reflected in the mainstream media." For her, photography was a way of gaining access to people and spaces that sparked her curiosity. The goal of her work is to move beyond stereotypes of black people and represent each person as a unique individual.

Johnson Artur received her MA in Photography from the Royal College of Art in London and has taught at the London College of Communication.

== Career ==
Johnson Artur has spent the past 30 years photographing the diverse experience of black people across the globe. For the majority of her recent career, she has been focused on representing black people in South London.

=== Artistic practice ===
In an interview with The Photographers' Gallery she described this need to represent the personal style and the people she is capturing: "This way I believe photography can show us something very unique and still familiar."

=== Ideology ===
Johnson Artur is committed to consistently photographing black people globally, and noticing the diverse aesthetics in these communities. When asked if she considered her work to be political, she responded: "I take what I do very seriously, but I wouldn't necessarily have called it political unless you asked me that question. My work's political in the sense that it's about communicating, about being able to understand people's struggles, to learn how we can live together." Johnson Artur's work focuses on themes of self-presentation and issues of representation. The photographs are taken in public spaces in an endeavour to capture moments; to connect, see, hear and photograph with authenticity. In taking the photo, she is establishing their presence. These brief encounters are prompted by style, flamboyance and body language of people who catch her attention.

=== Exhibitions ===
Liz Johnson Artur: Dusha (Brooklyn Museum, New York, 2019). This solo exhibition, curated by Drew Sawyer, featured material from the Black Balloon Archive, including the artist's photo sketchbooks. The term Dusha is the Russian word for "soul".

This Synthetic Moment (David Nolan Gallery, New York, 2018). Curated by David Hartt, this exhibition also included work by James Barnor, Kwame Brathwaite, David Hartt, Zoe Leonard, and Christopher Williams. The show focused on themes of national identity, border crossing, transition and how we view each other in the public sphere.

A Thousand and X Little Actions (Lothringer 13 Halle, Munich, 2016). In this exhibition, Johnson Artur's Black Balloon Archive was shown for the first time. She was included in this show because of her focus and curiosity towards the lives of others, and her exploration of relationships between human beings. The show was curated by Jörg Koopmann and also included artists Jacob Holdt, David Hartt, William E. Jones, and Jason Larkin.

1.-3.Personal plural: wir, ihr, sie (Kunstverein, Leipzig, 2016). Thirteen of Johnson Artur’s photographs were included in this exhibition curated by Anna Voswinckel. The themes explored included border crossing, personal and community identity, Othering, and the relationship between artist and viewer.

Made You Look: Dandyism and Black Masculinity (The Photographers' Gallery, London, 2016). Twelve of Johnson Artur’s photographs from the Black Balloon Archive were included in this group photography exhibition, curated by Ekow Eshun. Among other artists included in the exhibition were Malick Sidibé, Jeffrey Henson Scales, and Samuel Fosso. The theme of the show was to explore the complications of the identity of the black dandy, how these men are trendsetters in many media realms while also at a high degree of vulnerability and at risk of state violence and incarceration.

=== Editorial and commercial work ===
Johnson Artur has worked for the last 30 years as a freelance editorial and commercial photographer on countless publications, including Vibe Magazine, Fader, i-D Magazine, and Spin Magazine. She has said that working commercially has provided her with opportunities to photograph people and places relevant to her own artistic practice to which she would not otherwise have had access.

She has photographed the likes of Mos Def, Blur, Amy Winehouse, the Spice Girls and toured with M.I.A, Lady Gaga, and Seun Kuti.

== Other projects ==
=== Black Balloon Archive ===
Consisting of hundreds of gelatin silver prints and chromogenic prints, Black Balloon Archive is an archive of images that reflect black communities and their members globally. It began in 1991 and is an ongoing project that involves a desire to create powerful images of the black diaspora and is motivated by a hunger to make connections with communities that, until her mid-twenties, she barely knew existed.

The name Black Balloon Archive comes from a song by Syl Johnson called "Black Balloons".

Black Balloon Archive is a project whose goal is to show respect to her subject's ability to control how they are presented in their own lives by honestly representing that image. In a media climate that often dehumanizes black people and uses their images in unethical ways, Artur's body of work is especially important as she focuses on her subjects’ ability to self-determine how they present and are seen by the viewer. The artist explained to i-D magazine that "there's a sense of pride in how people display themselves. It's why I like street portraits, because I think there's a real presence that everyone has."

=== "Russians of Colour" ===
Inspired by reconnecting with her father in 2010, Johnson Artur began documenting the stories of "Russians of Colour". Working in conjunction with journalist Sarah Bentley, the project focuses on black Russians who have grown up without either or both of their parents and who collectively describe themselves as Afro-Russians.

== Publications ==
- Liz Johnson Artur. Bierke, 2016. With more than 30 years of photographing strangers globally.

== Awards ==
- AIMIA AGO Prize. Artur was a nominee for the 2017 AIMIA AGO Prize, alongside Raymond Boisjoly, Taisuke Koyama, and Hank Willis Thomas. She received a prize for her place on the shortlist. During this competition, the Black Balloon Archive was displayed at the Art Gallery of Ontario alongside sketchbooks and two larger prints.
