= Gorokhovsky (surname) =

Gorokhovsky, feminine: Gorokhovskaya is a Russian-language surname. Notable people with the surname include:

- Elliot Gorokhovsky, the namesake of the minor planet 32002 Gorokhovsky
- Oleg Gorokhovsky, Ukrainian businessman, co-founder of Monobank (Ukraine)
- Raisa Gorokhovskaya, Soviet diver
- Sergio Gor, American businessman and political activist
- Shraga Gorokhovsky, birth name of Shraga Goren, Israeli politician

ru:Гороховский
