= Aaron Landes =

American rabbi (1929–2014)

- Born: October 1, 1929; Revere, Massachusetts, US
- Died: April 19, 2014 (aged 84); Elkins Park, Pennsylvania, US
- Education: Yeshiva University, Jewish Theological Seminary
- Occupations: Rabbi of Beth Sholom Congregation and admiral
- Years active: 1978–2014

Aaron Landes (October 1, 1929 – April 19, 2014) was an American rabbi in the Conservative movement and a rear admiral in the United States Naval Reserve. He served as rabbi of Beth Sholom Congregation in Elkins Park, Pennsylvania for 36 years. With his wife, Sora Eisenberg Landes, he founded the Forman Hebrew Day School, now known as the Forman branch of the Perelman Jewish Day School. He also was instrumental in founding the Hebrew Free Loan Society of Greater Philadelphia. During his time in Philadelphia, Landes served on the board of governors at Gratz College.

Born in 1929 in Revere, Massachusetts, Landes served in the United States Navy for two years after his ordination and continued in the United States Navy Reserve until 1989, reaching the rank of rear admiral and retiring as director of all reserve chaplains in the U.S. Navy Chaplain Corps. During his naval career, he was instrumental in the building of Jewish chapels at the United States Naval Academy in Annapolis, Maryland, and at the naval base in Norfolk, Virginia.
