= Göhren =

Göhren may refer to the following places:

Germany

- Göhren (Tramm), a village in the municipality Tramm in the district Ludwigslust-Parchim, Mecklenburg-Vorpommern
- Göhren, Rügen, a municipality in the district Vorpommern-Rügen, Mecklenburg-Vorpommern
- Göhren, Thuringia, a municipality in the district Altenburger Land, Thuringia

Czech Republic

- Klíny, a village in Most District

== See also ==
- Gören (disambiguation)
- MV Gohren, a Kriegsmarine coastal tanker
