= Arthur A. Goren =

American Jewish historian and professor (1926–2022)

- ארתור גורן
- Born: Arthur Gorenstein; February 15, 1926; Chelsea, Massachusetts, U.S.
- Died: March 11, 2022 (age 96)
- Other names: Aryeh, Artie
- Occupation(s): Professor and Scholar of American Jewish History
- Spouse: Ayalah Kadman-Goren
- Parent(s): Saul and Lillian Gorenstein

Arthur A. Goren (Hebrew: ארתור גורן; February 15, 1926 - March 11, 2022) was the Russell and Bettina Knapp Professor Emeritus of American Jewish History at Columbia University in New York City.

== Early life ==
Arthur Aryeh Goren was born Arthur Gorenstein to Saul and Lillian Gorenstein, Jewish Labor Zionists. He was raised in Washington, DC, and New York City, NY, and was an activist in the Habonim (“the builders”), a Labor Zionist youth movement.

He enlisted in the army reserves when he turned eighteen in February 1944 and completed his freshman year of Hebrew Studies at the Teacher’s Institute of Yeshiva College while preparing for the army. He entered the service in July 1944 and trained in Mississippi. He was never posted overseas and was discharged in December 1945. He went directly to a Habonim convention.

He made aliyah (immigrated) to Israel in 1951 “to fulfill his youthful Zionist dreams. Those ideals also included fighting ‘with like-minded people everywhere for the emergence of a better society.’”

== Education ==
He completed a Bachelor of Arts in Jewish History at the Hebrew University of Jerusalem in 1957, and continued with some graduate studies in History at the same institution from 1958-1959. As a veteran, he attended the Hebrew University on the GI Bill, which had no geographic restrictions. He then returned to the United States, completing both a Master's of Arts in 1964 and a PhD in U.S. History in 1966 at Columbia University. Just prior to graduation, he Hebraicized his last name to “Goren.”

== Professional life ==
Goren returned to Israel and taught at the Hebrew University from 1966-1988. He then went back to Columbia University and was the Russell and Bettina Knapp Professor of American Jewish History from the chair's establishment in 1988 through his retirement in 2005. Specializing in “social and cultural Jewish history of the United States,” he has published numerous books and articles, including seminal works in the field.

Goren held visiting positions at Brandeis University, the University of Pennsylvania, and the Jewish Theological Seminary, and a Charles Warner Fellowship at Harvard University. He has held numerous positions on boards and committees, including Chairman of the Department of American Studies at the Hebrew University from 1970-1973 and again in the 1980s. He was a member of the American Jewish Historical Society’s Academic Council, and served on the editorial boards of American Jewish History, The Journal of American Ethnic History, and the YIVO Annual of Jewish Social Science.

== Publications ==
=== Books ===
- Congregating and Consecrating at Central Synagogue: The Building of a Religious Fellowship and Public Ceremonies, 2003
- Dissenter in Zion: From the Writings of Judah L. Magnes, 1982
- National Leadership in American Jewish Life: The Formative Years, 1989
- New York Jews and the Quest for Community: The Kehillah Experiment, 1908-1922, 1979
- Saints and Sinners: The Underside of American Jewish History, 1988
- Studies in American Civilization, 1987
- The American Jews, 1980
- The American Jews: Dimensions of Ethnicity, 1982
- The Politics and Public Culture of American Jews, 1999

=== Articles and chapters ===
- "A Golden Decade for American Jews, 1945-1955" in American Jewish History, 1998
- "Ben Halpern: 'At Home in Exile'" in The 'Other' New York Jewish Intellectuals, 1994
- "Between Ideal and Reality: Abba Hillel Silver's Zionist Vision" in Journal of Israeli History, 1996
- "Between Priest and Prophet" in Like All the Nations? The Life and Legacy of Judah L. Magnes, 1987
- "Celebrating Zion in America" in Encounters with The "Holy Land,", 1997
- "Sanctifying Scopus: Locating the Hebrew University on Mount Scopus" in Jewish History and Memory: Essays in Honor of Moshe Hayim, 2000
- "The Jewish Press in America" in The Ethnic Press of the U.S., 1987
- "The 'New Pluralism' and the Politics of Community Relations" in YIVO ANNUAL, 1990
- "The Wider Pulpit: Judah L. Magnes and the Politics of Morality" in Studies in American Civilization (Scripta Hierosolymitana), 1987
- "Traditional institutions transplanted: The hevra kadisha in Europe and the U.S." in The Jews of North America: Immigration, Settlement, and Ethnic Identity, 1987
- "Zionism and its Opponents in American Jewry" in Zionism and its Jewish Opponents, 1990

== Awards ==
In 1998, he received a Jewish Cultural Achievement Award for Historical Studies from the National Foundation for Jewish Culture.

== Personal life ==
Goren was married to Ayalah Kadman-Goren, daughter of Leo and Gurit Kadman. Kadman-Goren is a teacher, choreographer, and researcher of Israeli folk dance and culture. They have two sons.
