= Shosha Goren =

Israeli actress

- שושה גורן
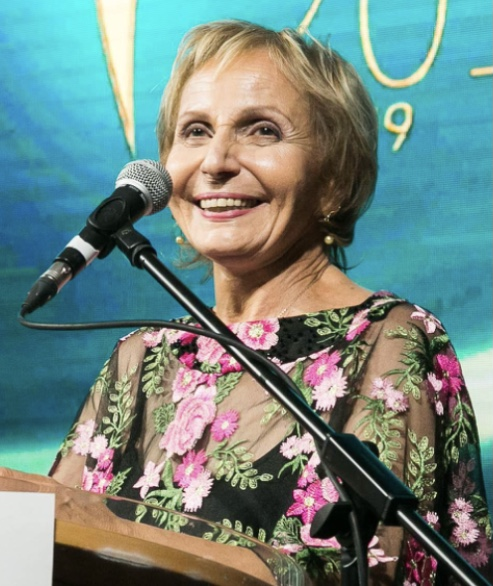
- Goren in 2019
- Born: 18 February 1943 (age 83); Baghdad, Iraq
- Occupations: Actress; comedian; playwright
- Years active: 1978–present
- Spouse: Yitzhak Goren
- Children: 3

Shosha Goren (Hebrew: שושה גורן; born 18 February 1943) is an Israeli actress, playwright and comedian of Iraqi Jewish descent. She immigrated to Israel in 1951. While on a visit to the United States, she abandoned her position as teacher of Hebrew Literature and Language and went on to pursue her acting career at Brooklyn College in New York. However, in 1980, she returned to Israel with her family.

Goren also starred in the 2007 Israeli film Jellyfish alongside Sarah Adler.

== Personal life ==
Goren is married to Yitzhak Goren, an Egyptian Jewish writer and director. they have three children, thirteen grandchildren, and two great-grandchildren. Lives in Kfar Kisch.
