= Gören =

Gören is a Turkish surname and given name. Notable persons include:

- Ahmet Macit Gören (1871–1946), Ottoman Turkish statesman
- Ali Ferit Gören (1913–1987), Austrian-Turkish Olympic sprinter
- Şerif Gören (1944–2024), Turkish film director
- Gören Bulut (born 1945), Turkish painter and arts professor

== See also ==
- Goren (surname)
- Göhren (disambiguation)
