= American Jewish History =

- Discipline: History, Judaic studies
- Language: English
- Edited by: Dianne Ashton

Publication details
- Former name(s): Publications of the American Jewish Historical Society, American Jewish Historical Quarterly
- History: 1892–present
- Publisher: Johns Hopkins University Press for the American Jewish Historical Society (United States)
- Frequency: Quarterly

Standard abbreviations
- ISO 4: Am. Jew. Hist.

Indexing
- ISSN: 1086-3141
- OCLC no.: 51003412

Links
- Journal homepage; Online access

American Jewish History is an academic journal and the official publication of the American Jewish Historical Society. The journal was established in 1892 and focuses on all aspects of the history of Jews in the United States. The journal was formerly titled Publications of the American Jewish Historical Society and American Jewish Historical Quarterly. The current editors-in-chief of the journal are Jessica Cooperman (Muhlenberg College), Judah M. Cohen (Indiana University), and Marni Davis (Georgia State University). Recent former editors include Kirsten Fermaglich (Michigan State University), Adam Mendelsohn (University of Cape Town), Daniel Soyer (Fordham University), Dianne Ashton (Rowan University), Eric L. Goldstein (Emory University), Eli Faber (John Jay College), Arthur A. Goren (Columbia University), and Marc Lee Raphael (College of William and Mary). The journal is published quarterly by the Johns Hopkins University Press.
