= Göhren (Tramm) =

- Ortsteil of Tramm
- Interactive map of Göhren
- Location within Germany Location within Mecklenburg-Vorpommern
- Coordinates: 53°32′N 12°6′E
- Country: Germany
- State: Mecklenburg-Vorpommern
- District: Ludwigslust-Parchim
- Municipality: Tramm
- Subdivisions: 3 Ortsteile

Area
  - Total: 20.02 km^{2} (7.73 sq mi)
- Elevation: 44 m (144 ft)

Population (2009-12-31)
  - Total: 400
  - Density: 20/km^{2} (52/sq mi)
- Time zone: UTC+01:00 (CET)
  - Summer (DST): UTC+02:00 (CEST)
- Postal codes: 19089
- Dialling codes: 03861
- Vehicle registration: PCH
- Website: http://www.amt-crivitz.de/

Göhren (German pronunciation: [ˈɡøːʁən]) is a village in Mecklenburg-Vorpommern, Germany. Since 1 July 2011, it is part of the municipality Tramm. It was formerly a municipality in the Ludwigslust-Parchim district.

== Attractions ==
Local attractions in Göhren include:

- Die Göhrener Kirche (church)
- Badestelle Göhren
