= Yitzhak Goren =

Egyptian-born Israeli writer (born 1941)

- יצחק גורן
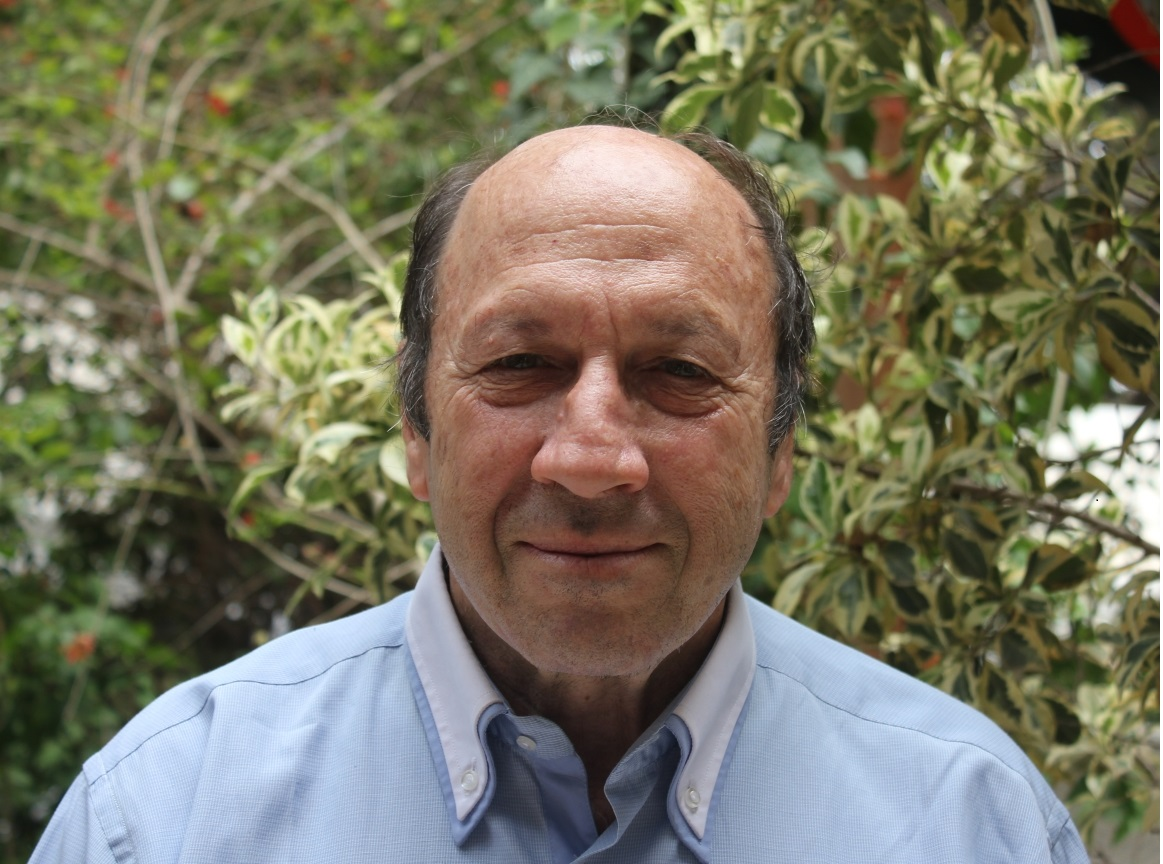
- Born: Yitzhak Gormezano Goren; 1941 (age 84–85); Alexandria, Egypt
- Education: Brooklyn College
- Occupation: Writer
- Years active: 1966–present
- Spouse: Shosha Goren
- Awards: Prime Minister's Prize for Hebrew Literary Works

Yitzhak Gormezano Goren (Hebrew: יצחק גורן; born 1941) is an Egyptian-born Israeli writer.

== Biography ==
Yitzhak Gormezano Goren was born in Alexandria. His family immigrated to Israel when he was a child. He received an MFA in theater directing from Brooklyn College.

He is married to the actress Shosha Goren.

== Literary and theater career ==
Yitzhak Goren co-founded the Kedem Stage Theater in Tel Aviv in 1982 and ran it for three decades, the Kedem stage publishing house in 1998 and the "Hakivun Mizrakh" (Eastward) literary review in 2000. As a writer, Gormezano Goren is known for his 1978 novel Alexandrian Summer, which was translated into English by Yardenne Greenspan. He won the Ramat Gan Prize for Literature, the Prime Minister's Prize for Hebrew Literary Works, the Israeli Ministry of Culture's Prize for a lifetime achievement in Hebrew literature in 2015 and the Yitzhak Navon's Prize for promoting Jewish Cultural Legacy in literature.

== Works ==
=== Novels ===
- The "Alexandrian trilogy"
  - Alexandrian Summer, Am Oved Publishing House, Tel Aviv, 1978. (Recipient of the Ramat Gan Prize). Reprinted in 2016. The English translation was published by New Vessel Press, New York, 2015.
  - Blanche, Am Oved Publishing House, Tel Aviv, 1986.
- The Path to the Stadium, Kedem Stage Publishing, Tel Aviv, 2003
- Mosheh, Maurice and Mussah (for youth), Kedem Stage Publishing, Tel Aviv, 1986.
- Shelter in Bavli or The Yellow Scorpion, Kedem Stage Publishing, Tel Aviv, 1998.

=== Historical Novels ===
- My Heart is in the East (The life and times of Medieval Poet Yehudah Halevi from Andalusia), Massada Publishing House, Tel Aviv, 1985.
- The Sun Rises in the West (The life and times of Rabbi Haim Ben Attar from Morocco, also known as "Or Hahaim Hakadosh"), Massada Publishing House, Tel Aviv, 1985.
- The Wise Man from Baghdad (The life and times of Rabbi Yoseph Haim from Baghdad, also known as "Haben Ish Hay"), Kedem Stage Publishing, Tel Aviv, 2008.
- The "Seniora Quartet" (The life and times of Dona Gracia Mendes-Nassi). It includes:
  - The Sacred Lie, Hakibbutz Hame'uhad Publisher, Tel Aviv, 2010.
  - The Queen Of Finance, Hakibbutz Hame'uhad Publisher, Tel Aviv, 2013.
  - Venitian Fever, Hakibbutz Hame'uhad Publisher, Tel Aviv, 2015.
  - Queen Of The Jews, Hakibbutz Hame'uhad Publisher, Tel Aviv, 2019.

=== Plays ===
- The Gospel According to Midorus, Award and publication: the Cultural Council, Israel, 1966.
- Jackasses (based on seven comedies by Plautus), The Haifa City Theater, 1971.
- Kroopnick's Soup, The Tel Aviv Workshop for Israeli Drama, 1972
- A Simple Tale (based on Shay Agnon's novella, in collaboration with Shlomo Nitzan), Habima Theater, 1976 (Recipient of the Gubinska-Baratz award for best play)
- L'Haim George – a Jewish Bi-Centennial celebration (A Musical, in collaboration with Charline Spektor), The BJE Board of Jewish Education Theater, New York, 1976
- Snap – A Zionistic Musical Review, The BJE Theater, New York, 1977.
- Palms and Dreams (based on two novelettes by Sami Michael), The Orna Porath Youth Theater, (including stage directing), 1982.
- An Alexandrian Romance (based on the author's "Alexandrian trilogy" and Judeo-Spanish
- Songs), The Kedem Stage Theater (including directing & acting), 1985.
- Water, Sky and a Wooden Chest (A Musical, based on Yehudah Halevi's life and poems), The Kedem Stage and The Haifa City Theater (including directing), 1987.
- A New York Dream (Israelis in America), The Kedem Stage and The Simta Jaffa Theater (including directing), 1988.
- The Egyptian Moliere (A Musical, based on the life of the Egyptian Jew Ya'oub Sanua –
- founder of the Egyptian Theater), The Kedem Stage, 1991.
- A Venitian Mascarade (based on an episode in the life of Dona Gracia Mendes-Nassi), The Kedem Stage, 1992 (500 years after the expulsion of the Jews from Spain).
- The Exploits of Hojah Nasr-a-Din, The Kedem Stage and The Haifa Children's Theater Festival, 1995.
- A License to Live (based on the author's novel Shelter in Bavli), The Beer-Sheva City Theater, 1999.
- Raphael's Last Romanza, The Kedem Stage Theater (including directing & acting), 2003.
- Oh, Dimonah! Dimonah!, The Kedem Stage Theater (including directing), 2005.
- The Senora My Love (based on the life of Dona Gracia Mendes-Nassi), The Kedem Stage Theater and The House of Dona Gracia in Tiberias, 2007
- Please Return To Us, Philoctetes, The Kedem Stage Theater, 2008.
- A Simple Tale (based on Shay Agnon's novelette, in collaboration with Shlomo Nitzan), Haifa City Theatre, 2009.
- A Cantor at the Bath House (based on Asher Knafo's book of Moroccan humor), The Kedem Stage Theater (including directing), 2010.

=== Television ===
- Glory to David – A Drama for Television (based on the life of Jewish Moroccan liturgical
- poet Rabbi David Hassin) The Israeli Educational Television in Tel Aviv, 1987.
- Embroidery of Words and Stones – A Historical Documentary on The Jewish Golden Age
- in Medieval Spain, The Israeli Educational Television in Tel Aviv, 1992.
- Test Drive – A Drama for Television, Channel Two Israeli Television (Recipient of the Albin award for best TV script), 2000.
- Prince of the Transit Camp – A Docu-drama, Hot Cable TV Israel, Channel Eight (including directing & participating), 2005.

=== Radioplays ===
- The Transplanted Heart and the Boxer's Glove, Kol Israel, Israeli Broadcasting Authority.
- What's Left of You, Alexandria? Galei Tzahal, the IDF Broadcasting Service.
- Dream the Tiberias Kingdom, A Four Parts Series (based on the life of Dona Gracia Mendes-Nassi), Kol Israel, Israeli Broadcasting Authority.
- A New York Dream, A Three Parts Series, Kol Israel, Israeli Broadcasting Authority.
- Tom Jones, (Based on Henry Fielding) A Serial of Twenty Episodes, Kol Israel, Israeli Broadcasting Authority.
- Yesterday and Before (based on Shay Agnon's monumental novel) A Serial (Forty Episodes) Galei Tzahal, the IDF Broadcasting Service.

== See also ==
- Hebrew Literature
