= Shraga Goren =

Israeli politician (1898–1972)

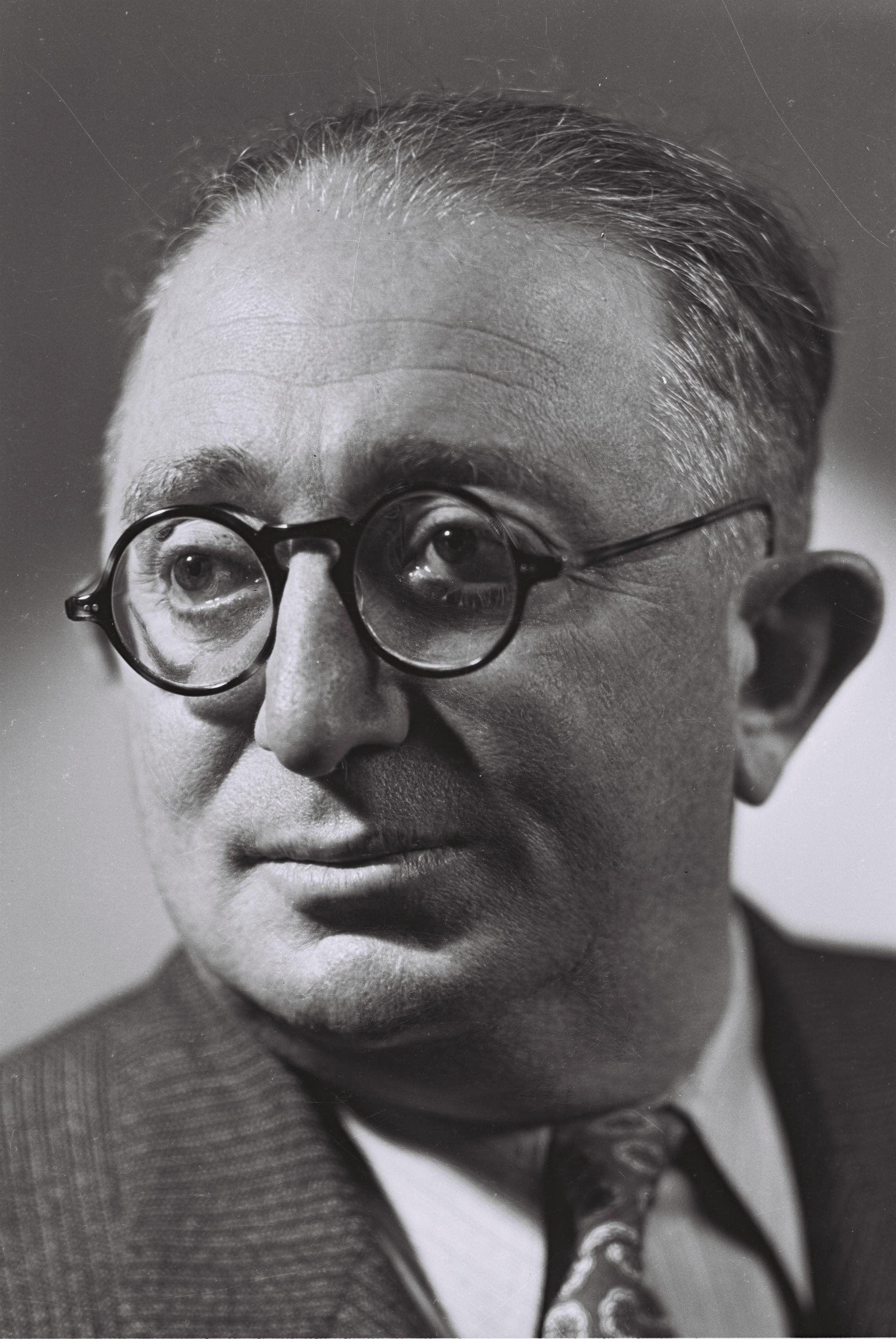
- Goren in 1952

Faction represented in the Knesset
- 1949–1951: Mapai

Personal details
- Born: 25 July 1897 Makariv, Russian Empire
- Died: 12 June 1972 (aged 74)

Shraga Goren (Hebrew: שרגא גורן; 25 July 1897 – 12 June 1972) was an Israeli politician.

== Biography ==
Goren was born Shraga Gorokhovsky in Makariv in the Russian Empire (today in Ukraine) to Aharon and Haya Sarah. He studied in a heder and a high school in Kiev. He also attended the University of Kiev, but did not finish his studies. In 1913 he joined Tzeiri Zion, and the following year became a member of the Time to Build commune. In 1917 he was one of the founding members of Dror. He also joined the Jewish Legion. In 1920 he married Esther Bat Beb-Zion Klioner; they had two children, Michal and Avigail.

In 1921 he emigrated to Mandatory Palestine, where he was amongst the founders of Tel Aviv's first planning group. He worked in the Office of Public Works and Building, and became one of the heads of the Solel Boneh construction company. Between 1924 and 1929 he served as chairman of the transportation co-operative and of the co-operatives centre.

In 1949 he was elected to the first Knesset on the Mapai list, and served on the Economic Affairs committee and the Labour committee. He lost his seat in the 1951 elections.

He died on 12 June 1972.
