= David Hartt =

Visual artist

- Born: 1967 (age 58–59); Montreal
- Education: University of Ottawa and the School of the Art Institute of Chicago
- Known for: Interdisciplinary artist
- Website: davidhartt.net

David Hartt is a Canadian artist and educator living and working in Philadelphia, Pennsylvania. Hartt works across various media to examine the transformation of ideas and histories over time.

== Education ==
Hartt received his Bachelor of Fine Arts from the University of Ottawa in 1991 and a Master in Fine Arts from The School of the Art Institute of Chicago in 1994.

== Career ==
Hartt travels extensively to develop his research based work. In 2015, Hartt was included in the survey Ocean of Images: New Photography 2015 at the Museum of Modern Art. In the wake of Hurricane Maria in 2017, Hartt produced a series of interventions on Habitat Puerto Rico, a housing development initially designed by Moshe Safdie and subsequently abandoned by the Puerto Rican government in the 1970s. By placing videos, sculpture, sound, photographs alongside plants and other biomaterials, Hartt attempted to investigate the site not as the development it was intended to be but as what it became.

‘What's interesting is not only the response to the failed utopia, but really using Safdie's project as evidence of which to examine the contemporary context of Puerto Rico, looking its status as colonial state, the debt crisis, the failures of new liberalism. For me it's an amplifier, it's a way through which I can begin to explore these ideas.’

In 2021, the Philadelphia Museum of Art celebrated their reopening after a $228 million reconstruction with the exhibition New Grit: Art & Philly Now in which Hartt is featured. He is an assistant professor in the Department of Fine Art at the University of Pennsylvania. Hartt is represented by David Nolan Gallery. He is also a founding member of the Black Reconstruction Collective.

== Awards and honors ==
Hartt was honored by the Smithsonian's Hirshhorn Museum and Sculpture Garden at their fifth gala event in 2019. He was invited by fellow artist Christopher Williams who cited Hartt as an influence on his practice. The Harvard Graduate School of Design selected Hartt as a juror for their Wheelwright Prize in 2021.
