= The Hudson Brothers discography =

Hudson Brothers discography
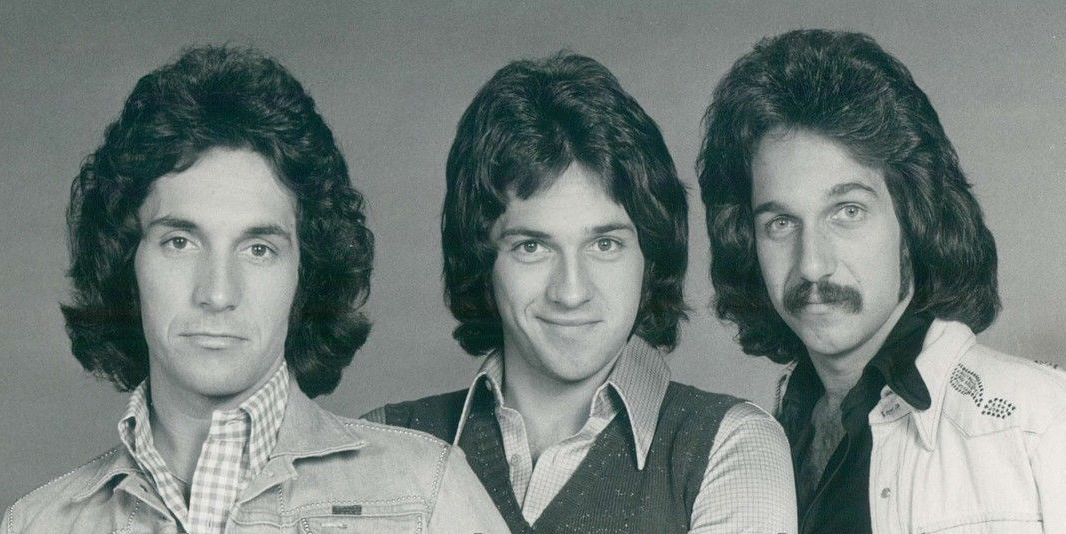
- Bill, Brett, and Mark Hudson, 1974
- Studio albums: 6
- Compilation albums: 1
- Singles: 24
- B-sides: 22

The Hudson Brothers were an American music group from Portland, Oregon, United States, who released numerous singles and albums under the names the New Yorkers, the Hudson Brothers, Everyday Hudson, and Hudson. The group was formed in 1965 by brothers Bill Hudson, Mark Hudson, and Brett Hudson. Their discography includes six studio albums, one compilation album, and 24 singles.

Established while the three brothers were still teenagers, the group released a series of 45 RPM singles in the mid and late-1960s under the group name The New Yorkers (based on the Chrysler New Yorker automobile), including a cover of Harry Nilsson's "I Guess the Lord Must Be in New York City" in 1969. In 1970, they released the single "Laugh, Funny Funny" as Everyday Hudson, before releasing their debut album, Hudson, in 1972 through Playboy Records; this album was released under their surname alone.

After being signed to Elton John's label The Rocket Record Company by producer Bernie Taupin in 1973, the group changed their name to the Hudson Brothers, releasing the albums Hollywood Situation and Ba-Fa (1975). Their single "So You Are a Star" from Hollywood Situation was their most commercially successful hit, peaking on the Billboard 100 at number 21, and on the Canadian RPM chart at number 5. Their appearances on the Sonny & Cher show and their own short-lived variety hour, The Hudson Brothers Razzle Dazzle Show, afforded them further fame as teen idols. In 1978, they released the album The Truth About Us through Arista Records, followed by their final studio album, Damn Those Kids, credited as Hudson and released by Elektra in 1980.

== Albums ==
=== Studio albums ===
Title	Album details	Peak chart positions		Certifications	Credited as
Title	Album details	US	CAN	Certifications	Credited as
Hudson	Released: 1972; Label: Playboy Records; Formats: Vinyl, 8-track	–	–		Hudson
Hollywood Situation	Released: 1974; Label: Casablanca Records; Formats: Vinyl, 8-track, cassette	174	–		Hudson Brothers
Totally Out Of Control	Released: 1974; Label: The Rocket Record Company; Formats: Vinyl, 8-track, cassette	179	–		Hudson Brothers
Ba-Fa	Released: 1975; Label: The Rocket Record Company; Formats: Vinyl, 8-track, cassette	176	–		Hudson Brothers
The Truth About Us	Released: 1978; Label: Arista Records; Formats: Vinyl, 8-track, cassette	–	–		Hudson Brothers
Damn Those Kids	Released: 1980; Label: Elektra Records; Formats: Vinyl, cassette	–	–		Hudson
"—" denotes releases that did not chart.

=== Compilations ===
Title	Album details	Peak chart positions	
Title	Album details	US	CAN
TV's Hudson Brothers	Released: 1978; Label: First American Records; Formats: Vinyl	–	–
So You Are A Star: The Best Of The Hudson Brothers	Released: 1995; Label: Varese Vintage; Formats: CD	–	–
"—" denotes releases that did not chart.

== Singles ==
Year	Titles (A-side, B-side)	Peak chart positions			Album	Credited as
Year	Titles (A-side, B-side)	US	CAN	AUS	Album	Credited as
1967	"When I'm Gone" b/w "You're Not My Girl"	–	–	–	Non-album singles	The New Yorkers
1967	"Seeds of Spring" b/w "Mr. Kirby"	–	–	–	Non-album singles	The New Yorkers
1967	"Again" b/w "Show Me the Way to Love"	–	–	–	Non-album singles	The New Yorkers
1968	"Ice Cream World" b/w "Adrienne"	–	–	–	Non-album singles	The New Yorkers
1969	"Land of Ur" b/w "Michael Clover"	–	–	–	Non-album singles	The New Yorkers
1969	"I Guess the Lord Must Be in New York City" b/w "Do Wah Diddy"	–	–	–	Non-album singles	The New Yorkers
1970	"Laugh, Funny Funny" b/w "Love is the Word"	–	–	–	Non-album singles	Everyday Hudson
1971	"The World Would Be A Little Bit Better" b/w "Love Nobody"	–	–	–	Non-album singles	Hudson
1971	"Straight Up and Tall" b/w "Enough"	–	–	–	Non-album singles	Hudson
1972	"Leavin' It's Over"	110	–	–	Hudson	Hudson
1973	"If You Really Needed Me" b/w "America" and "Fight Back"	–	–	–	Non-album singles	Hudson
1973	"Straight Up and Tall" b/w "America" and "Fight Back"	–	–	–	Non-album singles	Hudson
1974	"Coochie Coochie Coo" b/w "Me and My Guitar"	108	–	–	Non-album singles	Hudson Brothers
1974	"Be A Man"	–	–	–	Totally Out Of Control	Hudson Brothers
1974	"So You Are a Star" b/w "Ma Ma Ma Baby"	21	5	51	Hollywood Situation	Hudson Brothers
1975	"Rendezvous" b/w "Medley"	26	35	61	Ba-Fa	Hudson Brothers
1975	"Lonely School Year" b/w "If You really Need Me"	57	–	–	Ba-Fa	Hudson Brothers
1976	"Help Wanted" b/w "The Last Time I Looked"	70	78	–	The Truth About Us	Hudson Brothers
1976	"Spinning the Wheel (With the Girl You Love)" b/w "Bernie Was A Friend Of Ours"	–	–	–	Ba-Fa	Hudson Brothers
1977	"I Don't Wanna Be Lonely" b/w "Pauline"	–	–	–	The Truth About Us	Hudson Brothers
1978	"The Runaway" b/w "You Can't Make Me Cry"	–	–	–	The Truth About Us	Hudson Brothers
1980	"Afraid To Love" b/w "Sidewalk"	–	–	–	Damn Those Kids	Hudson
1980	"Annie"	–	–	–	Damn Those Kids	Hudson
1980	"Joni" b/w "Annie"	–	–	–	Damn Those Kids	Hudson
"—" denotes releases that did not chart.
