= Wayne Darwen =

Australian journalist and television producer

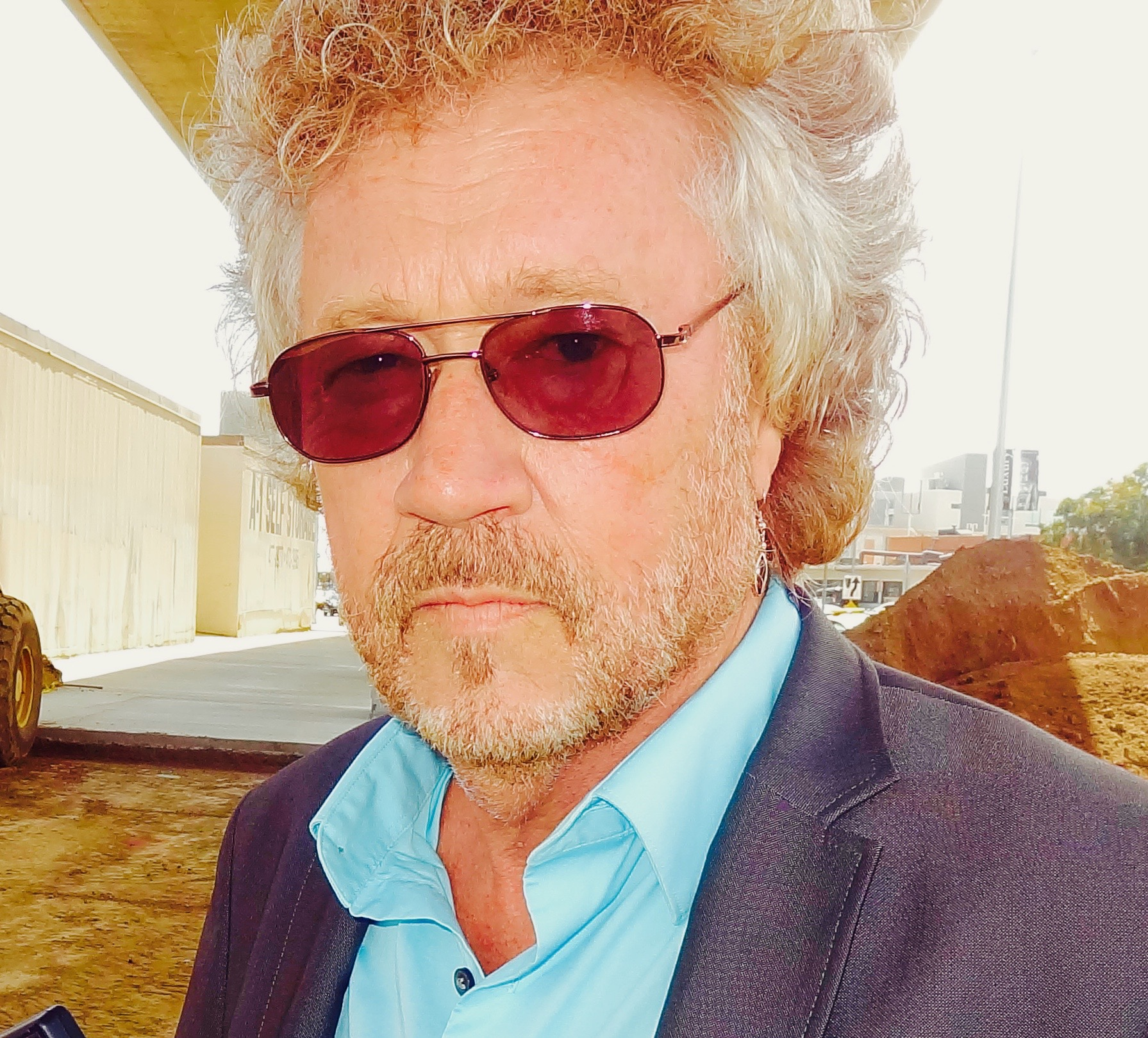
- Wayne Darwen in June 2015
- Born: Australia
- Occupations: Journalist, television producer, filmmaker

Wayne Darwen is an Australian journalist, television producer and filmmaker best known for his work in the tabloid television genre and as director and star of the film, High There (2015).

Began career as a 17-year-old reporter for a newspaper in Sydney, Australia. He worked internationally as a reporter for titles such as Sydney Daily Mirror, Star magazine and the New York Post, before moving to American television as a producer of tabloid newsmagazine shows like A Current Affair, Hard Copy, Geraldo Rivera’s Now It Can be Told, Strange Universe and Inside Edition.

He received attention for his 1993 series of televised interviews with Son of Sam killer David Berkowitz, in which Berkowitz claimed the murders were the work of a Satanic cult. He appeared as reporter in the documentary film, Dark Mirror of Magick: The Vassago Millennium Prophecy (2012).

His early television exploits were featured in the 1999 book Tabloid Baby, written by his colleague Burt Kearns.

In May 2015, Darwen made international news when he responded to Robert Downey Jr.’s attack on journalists and independent films.

== High There ==
Darwen wrote, directed (with Henry Goren), produced and took on the guise of Dave High in the documentary film High There (2015), a nonfiction comedy about the efforts of Darwen and Henry Goren to film the pilot for a marijuana travelogue series on the island of Hawaii. They wind up in various misadventures, while uncovering a Drug Enforcement Administration campaign to control the marijuana trade and to persecute marijuana activist Roger Christie. It is the first leg of a filmic journey that picks up where Darwen's colleague and inspiration Hunter S. Thompson left off.

High There premiered 25 August 2014 at the Action on Film International Film Festival in Monrovia, California. Darwen was on location in Adelaide at the time, so he appeared at the premiere as a life-size cardboard cut-out. The film won the Viewers' Choice Award at the first annual Cannabis Film Festival in Humboldt County, California on May 3, 2015. On the heels of several rave reviews, it was released on VOD and Limited Edition DVD by BrinkVision on June 23, 2015.
