= High There =

- High There DVD cover
- Directed by: Wayne Darwen
- Screenplay by: Wayne Darwen
- Starring: Wayne Darwen; Henry Goren
- Cinematography: Henry Goren
- Release date: August 25, 2014 (Action on Film)
- Language: English

High There is a 2014 dark, nonfiction comedy film about a real-life, legendary but down-and-out tabloid television journalist who heads to Hawaii to film a marijuana travel series, only to become lost in a fog of drugs, sex and paranoia as he uncovers a secret government war to control the marijuana trade. The film touches on the controversial federal prosecution of marijuana advocate Roger Christie and his THC Ministry.

The film was released on DVD and Video on Demand by BrinkVision distribution on 23 June 2015.

The film was the Opening Selection of the first annual Cannabis Film Festival in Garberville, Humboldt County, California (known as the capital of marijuana farming) in May 2015, and won the festival's Viewers' Choice Award.

The film is directed by veteran tabloid journalist and television producer Wayne Darwen and videographer Henry Goren. The pair star in the film in the roles of Dave High and Roland Jointz, respectively. Darwen wrote the script. Darwen and Goren are credited as producers, along with award-winning television producer and documentary film director and producer Burt Kearns.

High There is a Sam Peters International Productions Unlimited and Good Story Productions presentation of a Rat Lung picture.

== History ==
On 8 August 2014, High There was named an official selection of the 2014 Action on Film International Film Festival. The festival in Monrovia, California hosted the premiere of the film on 25 August 2014.

== Reviews ==
In advance of its release, High There received excellent reviews from publications across the globe, including The Australian, LA Weekly, the Anchorage Press (Alaska), and The Huffington Post.

Additional favorable reviews followed the film's release.

== Cast ==
High There movie poster.

- Wayne Darwen
- Henry Goren
- E Girl
- Alien Tom
- Tony The Healer
- Bala The Coconut Boy
- LeAnn The Tile Lady
- Mrs. Bates
- Daryl
- Andrea
- Deep Shit
- Surfer Dave
- Hammerhead
- Share Christie
- Roseanne Barr (uncredited)
