= Bonkers! =

1979 British TV variety show

- Created by: The Hudson Brothers
- Starring: Bob Monkhouse and The Hudson Brothers
- Country of origin: United Kingdom
- No. of series: 1
- No. of episodes: 24

Production
- Producer: Jack Burns
- Production company: ATV

Original release
- Network: ITV
- Release: 1979 – 1979

Bonkers! is a British television variety show from ATV, and distributed by ITC Entertainment in the United States for syndication during the 1978–79 television season. The show aired later in 1979 on ITV in the United Kingdom. A total of 24 episodes were produced. The show was filmed at ATV's Elstree studios near London.

Starring Bob Monkhouse and the Hudson Brothers – Bill, Brett and Mark – the show featured sketches, guest stars and musical numbers from the chorus dancers known as The Bonkerettes. While not a big hit for ATV, it gained a cult audience in the United States where it was compared to Saturday Night Live.

After four episodes the show was curtailed in the United Kingdom by the 11-week-long ITV strike of 1979. When ITV returned only a small number of companies mainly Border Television, ATV, Granada and UTV broadcast a few additional episodes, however the series was not fully broadcast in the United Kingdom.
