= Lawrence Tierney =

American actor (1919–2002)

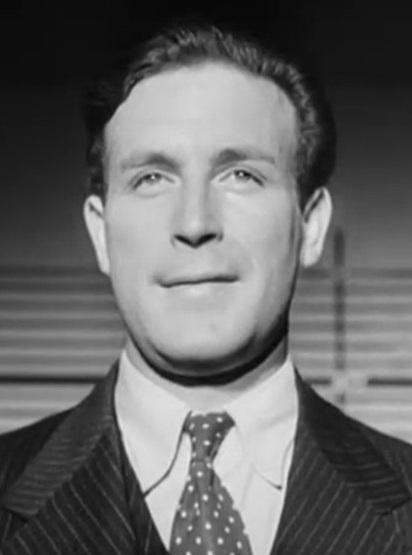
- Tierney in the trailer for Dillinger (1945), his first starring role
- Born: Lawrence James Tierney; March 15, 1919; New York City, U.S.
- Died: February 26, 2002 (aged 82); Los Angeles, California, U.S.
- Occupation: Actor
- Years active: 1943–1999
- Children: 1
- Relatives: Scott Brady (brother)

Lawrence James Tierney (March 15, 1919 – February 26, 2002) was an American film and television actor who is best known for his many screen portrayals of mobsters and "tough guys" in a career that spanned over fifty years. His roles mirrored his own frequent brushes with the law. In 2005, film critic David Kehr of The New York Times described "the hulking Tierney" as "not so much an actor as a frightening force of nature".

== Early life ==
Lawrence James Tierney was born in the Bedford-Stuyvesant neighborhood of Brooklyn, New York City on March 15, 1919, the son of Mary Alice (née Crowley; 1895–1960) and Lawrence Hugh Tierney (1891–1964). His father was an Irish-American policeman with the New York aqueduct police force. Tierney was a star athlete at Boys' High School, winning awards for track and field and joining Omega Gamma Delta fraternity.

After graduating from high school, he earned an athletic scholarship to Manhattan College but quit after two years to work temporarily as a laborer constructing a section of the 85-mile-long Delaware Aqueduct, which supplies nearly half of New York City's water supply. He then drifted around the country from job to job, working for a time as a catalogue model for Sears Roebuck & Company.

== Career ==
After an acting coach suggested he try the stage, Tierney joined the Black Friars theatre group, moving on to the American-Irish Theatre. He was spotted there in 1943 by an RKO talent scout and given a film contract to work in Hollywood, California. In 1943 and 1944, Tierney was cast in several uncredited roles in RKO releases such as Gildersleeve on Broadway, Government Girl, The Ghost Ship for producer Val Lewton, The Falcon Out West, Seven Days Ashore, and Youth Runs Wild, also for Lewton.

=== Dillinger and stardom ===
Tierney's breakthrough role was starring as 1930s bank robber John Dillinger in 1945's Dillinger, made for the King Brothers and Monogram Pictures, which borrowed him from RKO. Advertised as a tale "written in bullets, blood, and blondes", Dillinger was initially banned from theaters in Chicago and other cities where the gangster had operated. A low-budget production that cost $60,000 to make—equivalent to $1,073,000 in 2025—Dillinger nevertheless proved popular, with Tierney being characterized as "memorably menacing".

Back at RKO, Tierney resumed his work there in small and supporting roles in Those Endearing Young Charms (1945), Back to Bataan (1945) (with John Wayne in one scene), Mama Loves Papa (1946), and in the Western Badman's Territory (1946) in which he portrays Jesse James. However, as ticket sales for Dillinger continued to rise and that film's financial success became apparent at RKO, the studio promoted Tierney in 1946 to star status in Step by Step, another film noir, one that portrays an ex-Marine being falsely accused of murder. He next starred as a reformed prison inmate in the 1946 release San Quentin.

The next year he was cast as the lead in two more RKO productions that have since gained cult followings among film noir enthusiasts: The Devil Thumbs a Ride directed by Felix E. Feist and the more notorious Born to Kill directed by Robert Wise. In Feist's film, Tierney plays a homicidal hitch-hiker, while under Wise's direction he portrays a suave but murderous conman. Film critic Bosley Crowther of The New York Times condemned Born to Kill upon its release in 1947, professing that it was "not only morally disgusting but an offense to a normal intellect." He decried that Tierney, "as the bold, bad killer whose ambition is to 'fix it so's I can spit in anybody's eye,'" was "given outrageous license to demonstrate the histrionics of nastiness." Despite such negative contemporary reviews of the film, more recent critics and film historians have expressed admiration for Tierney's intense performance and identified the production as a quintessential example of film noir, in particular of RKO's approach to the genre.

Tierney attacking Elisha Cook Jr. in the film noir Born to Kill (1947)

Reflecting on his career, Tierney maintained that he did not like playing such violent roles:

I resented those pictures they put me in. I never thought of myself as that kind of guy. I thought of myself as a nice guy who wouldn't do rotten things. I hated that character so much but I had to do it for the picture.

Following Born to Kill, Tierney was periodically cast in more sympathetic roles. In RKO's 1948 release Bodyguard, based on a story co-written by Robert Altman and George W. George, he plays a man wrongly accused of murder. That year RKO also announced its intentions to star him in The Clay Pigeon, but Bill Williams was instead assigned the leading role.

=== Post-RKO ===
In 1950, Tierney was cast by Eagle-Lion Films to star in Kill or Be Killed, directed by Max Nosseck, who had also directed Dillinger. That same year, however, Tierney only received second billing in Joseph Pevney's Shakedown, although in 1951 he returned to a starring role in another film produced by Eagle Lion and directed by Nosseck: The Hoodlum. He then returned to RKO to play a supporting role, performing again as Jesse James in Best of the Badmen (1951). After co-starring in The Bushwhackers (1952), director Cecil B. DeMille cast him as the villain who causes a train wreck in the 1952 Best Picture Oscar-winner The Greatest Show on Earth. Tierney's supporting work in that film earned him a request by the director of Paramount Pictures to put him under contract, but that proposal was dropped by the studio when Tierney was arrested for fighting in a bar.

=== Additional supporting roles and return to the stage ===
For the remainder of the 1950s, Tierney continued to work in supporting roles in The Man Behind the Badge, The Steel Cage (1954), and Singing in the Dark (1956). He did share top billing with Kathleen Crowley, John Carradine, and Jayne Mansfield in the low-budget film noir Female Jungle (1956), but as offers of further screen work steadily declined, he returned to the stage, playing Duke Mantee in a touring version of The Petrified Forest alongside Franchot Tone and Betsy von Furstenberg.

=== Television ===
During the 1950s and 1960s, Tierney had guest roles in many television series, including Naked City, The Detectives, New York Confidential, Man with a Camera, Adventures in Paradise, Peter Gunn, The Barbara Stanwyck Show, Follow the Sun, Bus Stop, The Lloyd Bridges Show, and The Alfred Hitchcock Hour. Among his film roles were parts in John Cassavetes' A Child Is Waiting (1963), Naked Evil (1966), Custer of the West (1967), and Killer Without a Face (1968). After his work on A Child is Waiting he moved to France. After several years there, Tierney returned to New York City, but his troubles with the law resumed. In New York City, he worked as a bartender and construction worker, and drove a horse-drawn carriage in Central Park.

=== 1970–1982 ===
According to the book The Films of John Avildsen: Rocky, The Karate Kid and Other Underdogs, Tierney was supposed to play the role of Joe Curran in Avildsen's 1970 hit Joe. However, he was fired and replaced by Peter Boyle due to an incident two days before principal photography began when he was arrested for assaulting a bartender who refused to serve him any more hard liquor.

During the 1970s, he occasionally found film work, appearing in a bit part as a security guard in Otto Preminger's Such Good Friends (1971), as an FBI agent in Joseph Zito's Abduction (1975), in Andy Warhol's Bad, in 1976 (which he later described as "a terrible experience—unprofessional"), as well as small roles in Cassavetes' Gloria (1980) and Zito's The Prowler (1981). He was also in The Kirlian Witness (1980), Bloodrage (1980), and Arthur (1981). He was second billed in the independently produced horror film Midnight (1982).

=== Return to Hollywood ===
Tierney moved back to Los Angeles in December 1983, and over the next 16 years, resumed a fairly successful acting career in film and television. He guest-starred on several television shows such as Remington Steele, Fame, Hunter, Hill Street Blues, L.A. Law, Star Trek: The Next Generation, Star Trek: Deep Space Nine, and The Simpsons. Former Simpsons show runner Josh Weinstein called Tierney's appearance "the craziest guest star experience we ever had".

In 1985, Tierney had a small speaking role as the chief of the New York City police in John Huston's Prizzi's Honor. Between 1985 and 1987, Tierney made several guest appearances on the last two seasons of the police drama Hill Street Blues, portraying Desk Sergeant Jenkins working the precinct's night shifts. He spoke the last line of dialogue on the series' final episode when he answered the front desk phone, uttering "Hill Street."

Tierney had a more substantial supporting role as the father of protagonist Ryan O'Neal in Norman Mailer's film adaptation of his own novel Tough Guys Don't Dance (1987). He also played a baseball-bat wielding bar owner in the film adaptation of Stephen King's Silver Bullet. Tierney credited Tough Guys Don't Dance in particular with rejuvenating his acting career, and he personally ranked it as some of his best work. In 1988, Tierney played Cyrus Redblock, a tough holodeck gangster in the Star Trek: The Next Generation episode "The Big Goodbye". In February 1991, he guest-starred as Elaine Benes's gruff father Alton Benes in the Seinfeld episode "The Jacket".

=== Reservoir Dogs and later career ===
In 1991, Quentin Tarantino cast him in a supporting role as crime lord Joe Cabot in Reservoir Dogs. The success of the film bookended Tierney's career in playing gangsters. In an homage to his first starring role, Tierney reports that one of his henchmen was "dead as Dillinger". During production, Tierney's off-screen antics both amused and disturbed the cast and crew. At the end of his first week of directing Reservoir Dogs, Tarantino got into a shoving match with Tierney and fired him. Tarantino stated that Tierney had a tendency to abruptly walk away during conversations and Tarantino eventually became frustrated with Tierney's behavior while directing him and grabbed Tierney's arm as he attempted to walk away. Tierney stated, "Get your fucking hands off me!" and shoved Tarantino, prompting Tarantino to loudly banish him from the set in front of the crew. The entire crew burst into applause. He later referred to Tierney as "a complete lunatic" who "just needed to be sedated". Tierney's co-star Harvey Keitel later spoke with Tierney, Tarantino and the studio executives, allowing things to be smoothed out and the filming completed. After filming ended, Tierney privately apologized to Tarantino for his behavior and invited him to drink at a bar. Tarantino accepted his apology but declined to drink with Tierney, and vowed to never work with him again.

Despite his reputation as a brawler and being difficult to work with, Tierney remained in steady demand as a character actor in Hollywood until he suffered a mild stroke in 1995 which made him gradually slow his career. He had suffered a previous stroke in 1982. He turned to doing voice-over work on animated features and made occasional appearances in film and television in small roles (most of which feature him only sitting or laying down) as his health slowly deteriorated until his death. One of Tierney's later roles was an uncredited cameo appearance as Bruce Willis' disabled father in Armageddon (1998) in a short scene which ended up being deleted from the theatrical version. The same year, his long-time agent, Don Gerler, recounted Tierney's continuing troubles with the law: "A few years back [in 1994] I was still bailing him out of jail. He was 75-years-old and still the toughest guy in the bar!" His final acting role was a small part in the 1999 independent film Evicted, written and directed by his nephew Michael Tierney, after which Lawrence Tierney, then age 80, retired from acting altogether.

== Off-screen troubles ==
Tierney's numerous arrests for being drunk and disorderly, and jail terms for assault on civilians and police officers alike, took a toll on his career. He was an admitted alcoholic who tried to go sober in 1982 after having a mild stroke, once observing during a 1987 interview that he "threw away about seven careers through drink".

Between 1944 and 1951, Tierney was arrested at least twelve times in Los Angeles for brawling—fistfighting with multiple people—and frequently for drunkenness which included ripping a public telephone off a wall in a bar, hitting a waiter in the face with a sugar bowl for refusing to serve him any more drinks, and attempting to choke a taxi driver. He was jailed for three months for brawling in May 1947 and again in June 1949 and drunkenness in January 1949 and October 1950. His legal troubles included a 90-day jail sentence which he served from August to October 1951 for breaking a New York college student's jaw during another barroom brawl. He served 66 days in the city jail in Chicago, Illinois from March to May 1952 on drunk and disorderly charges. In October 1951, he was sent to a mental hospital in Chicago after being found in a church in a disheveled state. In New York City, he was arrested for assault and battery of a barroom pianist in August 1953, and in October 1958 for resisting arrest and assaulting two police officers in another barroom brawl. At the time of his October 1958 arrest outside a Manhattan bar, The New York Times reported that he had been arrested six times in California and five in New York City on similar charges.

In January 1973, he was stabbed in a bar fight on the West Side of Manhattan. Two years later, Tierney was questioned by New York City police in connection with the apparent suicide of a 24-year-old woman who had jumped from the window of her high-rise apartment. Tierney told police, "I had just gotten there, and she just went out the window." He was never arrested or charged with the young woman's death.

In July 1991, during the filming of Reservoir Dogs, Tierney shot at his nephew in a drunken rage at his Hollywood apartment, and was arrested and jailed. He was released for one day to continue filming, as recounted by the film's director Quentin Tarantino in an interview. Tarantino never again worked with or hired Tierney to act in his films.

Tierney's Reservoir Dogs co-star Chris Penn recounted an incident in which Tierney, for no apparent reason, stole a table lamp from a restaurant where they had eaten, and showed it off to Penn while the two drove in Penn's car.

Wil Wheaton recalled that while filming Season 1, episode 12 of Star Trek: The Next Generation in October 1987, Tierney questioned why the 15-year-old Wheaton did not play football in school and belittled him with homophobic slurs.

The Simpsons showrunners and writers Josh Weinstein and Bill Oakley stated on Twitter numerous incidents regarding Tierney's voice recording session for the show in 1995, including "terrorizing" the writers and staff, sexually harassing the female casting director and making strange demands for his role, such as insisting he voice the entire performance with a Southern accent.

In December 1990, during the filming of Season 2, episode 3 of Seinfeld, Jason Alexander and Jerry Seinfeld caught Tierney in the act of trying to steal a knife from the set. When Seinfeld confronted him, Tierney began to laugh nervously and jokingly pretended he would stab Seinfeld while imitating the music from the film Psycho. Tierney’s role was intended to be reoccurring on the show but after the incident, the entire crew was uncomfortable with Tierney, prompting Seinfeld not to hire him again. Julia Louis-Dreyfus complimented Tierney's performance on the show but stated he was a "total nutjob.”

== Personal life and death ==
With much of his career and personal life repeatedly embroiled in legal problems and hampered by chronic alcoholism as well as mental instability, Tierney never married despite having several short-term relationships with women in the 1940s, 1950s and 1960s. He did, however, father a daughter named Elizabeth who was born in 1961.

Both of Tierney's younger brothers preceded him in death, Edward in 1983 and Gerard (known by his stage name Scott Brady) in 1985. Tierney died in his sleep of pneumonia in a Los Angeles nursing home on February 26, 2002, at age 82. He had been residing there for about one year after suffering another debilitating stroke. Shortly before Tierney's death, Tarantino called him on his birthday and the two had a long conversation where they reiterated their apologies for one another. Afterward, Tierney remarked, "He's okay, that Quentin. That was very nice of Quentin to do that."

== Biography ==
The first biography of the actor, Lawrence Tierney: Hollywood's Real-Life Tough Guy, was written by Burt Kearns and published on December 6, 2022, by the University Press of Kentucky.

== Selected filmography ==
- Gildersleeve on Broadway (1943) as Cab Driver (uncredited)
- Government Girl (1943) as FBI Man (uncredited)
- The Ghost Ship (1943) as Seaman Louie Parker (uncredited)
- The Falcon Out West (1944) as Orchestra Leader (uncredited)
- Seven Days Ashore (1944) as Crewman (uncredited)
- Youth Runs Wild (1944) as Larry Duncan
- Dillinger (1945) as John Dillinger
- Those Endearing Young Charms (1945) as Lieutenant Ted Brewster
- Back to Bataan (1945) as Lieutenant Commander Waite
- Mama Loves Papa (1945) as Sharpe
- Sing Your Way Home (1945) as Reporter in Paris (uncredited)
- Badman's Territory (1946) as Jesse James
- Step By Step (1946) as Johnny Christopher
- San Quentin (1946) as Jim Roland
- The Devil Thumbs a Ride (1947) as Steve Morgan
- Born to Kill (1947) as Sam
- Bodyguard (1948) as Mike Carter
- Kill or Be Killed (1950) as Robert Warren
- Shakedown (1950) as Harry Colton
- The Hoodlum (1951) as Vincent Lubeck
- Best of the Badmen (1951) as Jesse James
- The Bushwackers (1951) as Sam Tobin
- The Greatest Show on Earth (1952) as Mr. Henderson
- The Steel Cage (1954) as Chet Harmon, a Ringleader (segment "The Hostages")
- Female Jungle (1956) as Detective Sergeant Jack Stevens
- Singing in the Dark (1956) as Biff Lamont
- The Alfred Hitchcock Hour (1963) (Season 1 Episode 32: "Death of a Cop") as Herbie Lane
- A Child Is Waiting (1963) as Douglas Benham
- Naked Evil (1966) as The Doctor (U.S. version)
- Custer of the West (1967) as General Philip Sheridan
- Killer Without a Face (1968)
- Such Good Friends (1971) as Hospital Guard
- Abduction (1975) as FBI Agent I
- Andy Warhol's Bad (1977) as O'Reilly-O'Crapface
- The Kirlian Witness (1979) as Detective
- Bloodrage (1980) as Malone
- Gloria (1980) as Broadway Bartender
- Arthur (1981) as Man in Coffee Shop
- The Prowler (1981) as Major Chatham
- Midnight (1982) as Bert Johnson
- Terrible Joe Moran (1984) as Pico
- Nothing Lasts Forever (1984) as Carriage Driver
- Prizzi's Honor (1985) as Lieutenant Davey Hanley
- Silver Bullet (1985) as Owen Knopfler
- Murphy's Law (1986) as Cameron
- From a Whisper to a Scream (1987) as Warden
- Tough Guys Don't Dance (1987) as Dougy Madden
- Star Trek: The Next Generation (1988) as Cyrus Redblock
- The Naked Gun: From the Files of Police Squad! (1988) as Angels Manager
- House III: The Horror Show (1989) as Warden
- Why Me? (1990) as Armenian Robber #1
- Dillinger (1991) as Sheriff Sarber
- Wizards of the Demon Sword (1991) as Slave Master
- The Runestone (1991) as Chief Richardson
- City of Hope (1991) as Kerrigan
- The Death Merchant (1991) as Ivan Yates
- Reservoir Dogs (1992) as Joe Cabot
- Eddie Presley (1992) as Joe West
- Red (1993 short) as Louis "Red" Deutsch
- Junior (1994) as Mover
- Starstruck (1995) as Patron
- Fatal Passion (1995) as Robert Pearlman
- 2 Days in the Valley (1996) as Older Man
- American Hero (1997) as Captain Roads
- Southie (1998) as Colie Powers
- Armageddon (1998) as Eddie "Gramp" Stamper (uncredited)
- Evicted (1999) as Bob (filmed in 1996; final role)

== See also ==
- Lawrence Tierney: Hollywood's Real-Life Tough Guy
