= The Seventh Python =

2008 film

The Seventh Python is a 2008 musical documentary film about the career, music and philosophy of pop satirist and songwriter Neil Innes, who has been known as the "seventh" member of the six-man Monty Python comedy troupe. The film, however, shows how Innes' influence and experience goes far beyond that chapter, to include his work with the Bonzo Dog Doo Dah Band, The Rutles and other projects. The Frozen Pictures film had its premiere at the American Cinematheque's Mods & Rockers Film Festival at the Egyptian Theatre in Hollywood in June 2008. The film was directed by Burt Kearns, and written and produced by Kearns and Brett Hudson.

The film features Innes in performance in Los Angeles, Sussex, England and Melbourne, Australia and features Pythons John Cleese, Eric Idle, Terry Jones and Michael Palin, as well as singer-songwriter Aimee Mann, Matt Groening (creator of The Simpsons), and composer/arranger John Altman, among others.

On 12 April 2009, the director and producer of The Seventh Python received the Las Vegas Film Festival's Golden Ace Award for "superior and standout filmmaking."

Three days later, the film was chosen as the Opening Selection of the 2009 Pacific Palisades Film Festival.

== Reviews ==
- Los Angeles Times
- The LAist
- Huffington Post
