= Frozen Television =

Former television production company

Frozen Television was a television production company specializing in documentaries and entertainment programming. Frozen Television was founded by Burt Kearns and Brett Hudson and was affiliated with the motion picture production company, Frozen Pictures.

It closed in 2012. Kearns now runs productions through his Good Story Productions.

== Projects ==
- Adults Only: The Secret History of The Other Hollywood for Court TV
- The Secret History of Rock 'n' Roll with Gene Simmons for Court TV
- All The Presidents' Movies with Martin Sheen for Bravo
- My First Time for Showtime
