= Hysterical (1983 film) =

- Theatrical release poster
- Directed by: Chris Bearde
- Written by: Chris Bearde; Bill Hudson; Brett Hudson; Mark Hudson; Trace Johnston
- Produced by: William J. Immerman; Gene Levy
- Starring: (See article)
- Cinematography: Thomas Del Ruth
- Edited by: Stanley Frazen
- Music by: Bob Alcivar; Robert O. Ragland
- Distributed by: Embassy Pictures
- Release date: July 30, 1983
- Running time: 86 minutes
- Country: United States
- Language: English
- Budget: $6 million

Hysterical is an American comedy film directed by Chris Bearde. Released on July 30, 1983, by Embassy Pictures, it is a spoof of the horror film genre. The film stars the Hudson Brothers.

In the film, a writer seeks inspiration at a haunted lighthouse in Oregon. He is used in a scheme by two ghosts, and two paranormal investigators subsequently arrive to study the past of the lighthouse.

== Plot ==
Frederic "Casper" Lansing is a writer who hopes to find inspiration while vacationing in Hellview, Oregon; however, the lighthouse in which he is staying is haunted by the ghost of Venetia, who had killed herself 100 years ago and now wants to use Lansing as a vessel for her dead lover, Captain Howdy. When Howdy's ghost starts killing people, two bumbling scientists are brought in to investigate the history of the lighthouse and solve the case.

== Cast ==
- Bill Hudson as Frederic "Casper" Lansing
- Mark Hudson as Dr. Paul Batton
- Brett Hudson as Fritz Batton
- Cindy Pickett as Kate
- Richard Kiel as Captain James Howdy
- Julie Newmar as Venetia
- Bud Cort as Dr. John
- Robert Donner as Ralph
- Murray Hamilton as The Mayor
- Clint Walker as The Sheriff
- Franklyn Ajaye as Leroy
- Charlie Callas as Count Dracula
- Keenan Wynn as Old Fisherman
- Gary Owens as TV announcer
- John Larroquette as Bob X. Cursion

== Home media ==
Hysterical was released on DVD by Image Entertainment on January 30, 2001.
