= Henry Goren =

American film director

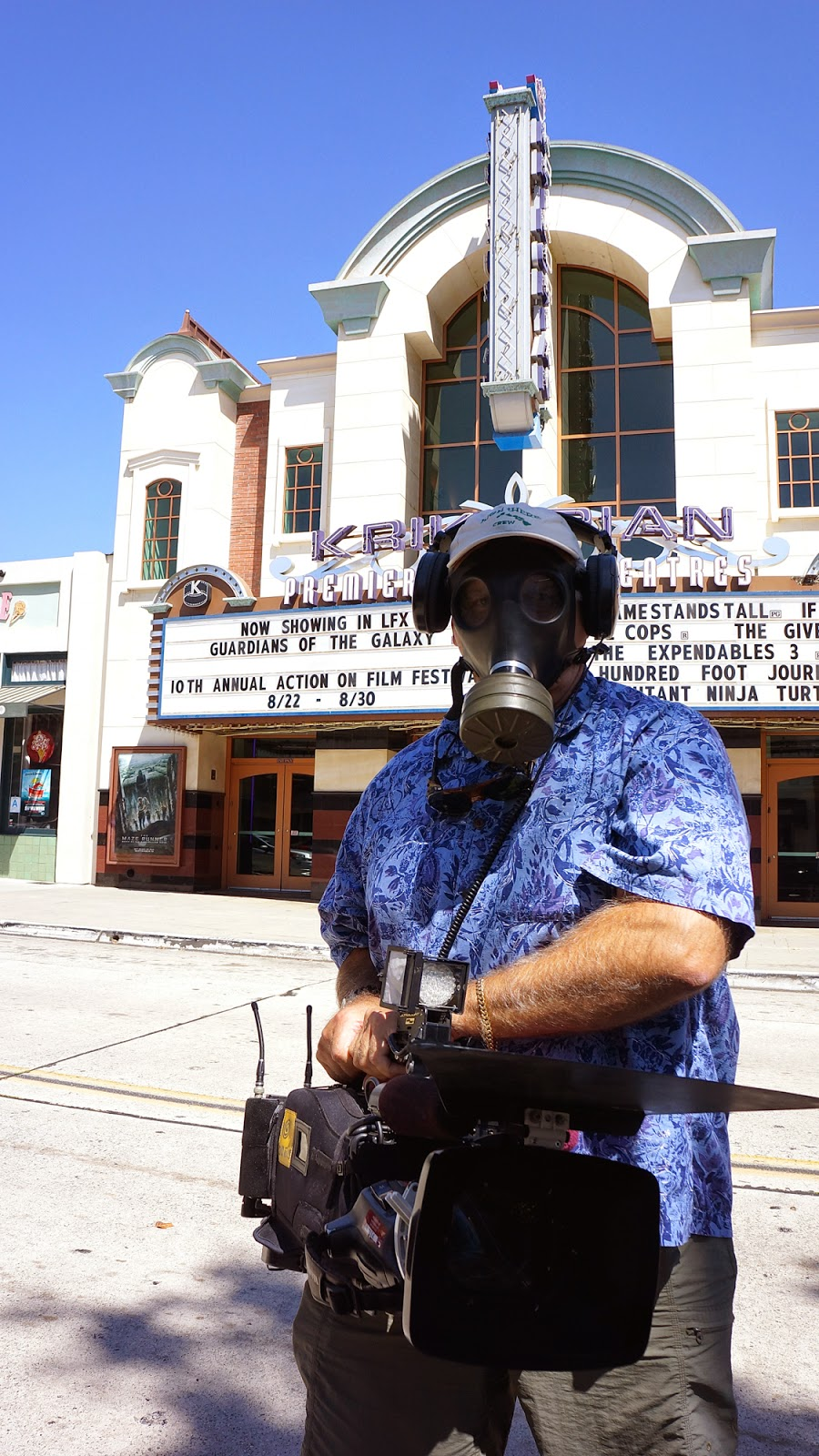
- Henry Goren at the premier of High There at Action on Film Festival in Monrovia, California on August 24, 2014.
- Born: United States
- Occupations: Filmmaker, photojournalist, videographer, director

Henry Goren is an American photojournalist, videographer, cinematographer, and documentary film director. He co-directed (with Wayne Darwen) and produced the 2014 documentary film, High There, which received coverage as part of the movement to legalize marijuana in the United States and to free Hawaiian marijuana activist Roger Christie from federal incarceration.

== Career ==
Goren began working in film in the post production department of Schick Sunn Classic Pictures in 1981, and was promoted to assistant film editor before moving to the television news business as cameraman for various Los Angeles television stations. He was later director of photography for Dateline, Extra, Celebrity Justice, TV's Bloopers & Practical Jokes and NBC’s Olympics coverage. Goren also did field camera work for the McNeil-Lehrer NewsHour and was director of photography for Alex Paen's series, Animal Rescue, Dog Tales and Real Green.

He was a stunt driver on Stingray, the NBC crime drama produced by Stephen J. Cannell, and appeared onscreen as a footballer on HBO's 1st and Ten and a police officer on General Hospital.

Goren lived and worked in Oahu, Hawaii from 1984 to 1989, where he was a cinematographer for Japanese television commercials, and stock photographer for Quadrant Pictures, UK and Stock Photos Hawaii. He was also a SCUBA instructor in Waikiki, Oahu, filming underwater tours of dive sites. He initiated one of Hawaii's first 'underwater' clean-up campaigns in Waikiki's Ala Wai boat harbor.

Goren was a director of photography for Clint Eastwood's Malpaso Productions on the 1998 video release, Monterey Jazz Festival: 40 Legendary Years.

Goren began freelancing as a videographer for Telepictures in 2002, where he met Wayne Darwen. The pair directed and produced High There, which premiered 25 August 2014 at the Action on Film International Film Festival in Monrovia, California. Goren was also credited as director of photography and editor. However, other sources refer to him as videographer or cameraman.

High There is a nonfiction comedy about the pair's efforts to film the pilot for a marijuana travelogue series on the island of Hawaii. They wind up in various misadventures, while uncovering a Drug Enforcement Administration campaign to control the marijuana trade and to persecute marijuana activist Roger Christie.

High There won the Viewers' Choice Award at the first annual Cannabis Film Festival in Humboldt County, California on May 3, 2015. It was released on VOD and DVD by BrinkVision on June 23, 2015. High There is a Sam Peters International Productions Unlimited and Good Story Productions presentation of a Rat Lung picture.

He is a member of AFTRA and the International Cinematographers Guild (IATSE Local 600).

== Petco protest ==
In January 2012, Goren organized a protest in Brea, California, against Petco and other corporations' involvement with Husky Camp, a nonprofit group that works to rescue and find new homes for Siberian and Malamute husky dogs. A former Husky Camp volunteer, Goren was quoted saying, "I don't want to see this rescue continue. I want the dogs to be taken care of in a better way." Protesters included members of the Occupy movement's Occupy Orange County offshoot, at the protest.

== Awards ==
- Henry Goren won a 2002 Golden Mike Award in the entertainment reporting division for the KCOP-TV-13 report, "A Star Is Born."
- In 2003, he was nominated for an Emmy Award for photographing the multi-part news series, "Dangerous Beauty."
- "Alien Tom," a documentary short filmed and directed by Henry Goren, won the Silver Lei Award 2017 Honolulu Film Awards for director.
- AREA 420 the serial episodes 1 and 2 won Gold in the Los Angeles Motion Picture Film Festival in May 2020 which Henry Goren directed and was director of photography.
