= Frozen Pictures =

Movie, TV, and multimedia production company

- Industry: Entertainment
- Founded: 2006
- Founder: Brett Hudson; Burt Kearns
- Defunct: 2012
- Products: Motion pictures; Television

Frozen Pictures was a motion picture, television and multimedia production company founded and operated by veteran producers and writers Brett Hudson and Burt Kearns, and is affiliated with Frozen Television. It closed in 2012.

Kearns now runs his productions through his Good Story Productions.

Produced the 2006 Burt Reynolds motion picture comedy Cloud 9 with The Ruddy Morgan Organization, released on DVD by 20th Century Fox Home Entertainment.

Produced the 2007 nonfiction film Basketball Man about the life and legacy of Dr. James Naismith, which premiered at the NBA All-Star Weekend in Las Vegas on February 17, and released on DVD on May 8, 2007.

Produced the 2008 nonfiction musical film, The Seventh Python, about the life and legacy of Bonzo Dog Doo-Dah Band founder and Monty Python's Flying Circus collaborator Neil Innes, which premiered June 26, 2008 at the American Cinematheque's Mods & Rockers Film Festival at the Egyptian Theatre in Hollywood.

Produced numerous television series, including the three-part All The Presidents’ Movies with Martin Sheen for Bravo and Adults Only: The Secret History of The Other Hollywood, hosted by Legs McNeil for Court TV, The Secret History of Rock ’n’ Roll with Gene Simmons for Court TV and the 26-episode series My First Time for Showtime.

Producers of the solo performance show, The New 30, written by Eric Cohen and starring Alan Bursky, which made its debut October 7, 2008 at The Laugh Factory in Hollywood.

Created and produced acclaimed television comedy pitch and viral video, American Dunkleman.

Began production on the nonfiction film, "El Viaje Musical de Ezekiel Montanez: The Chris Montez Story" in 2008. The film was previewed by Montez, Hudson and Kearns at The Fest for Beatles Fans in March 2010 in Secaucus, New Jersey and in May 2010 at the Pacific Palisades Film Festival in Pacific Palisades, California.
