= Kenneth Thorpe Rowe =

American professor of drama and playwriting (1900-1988)

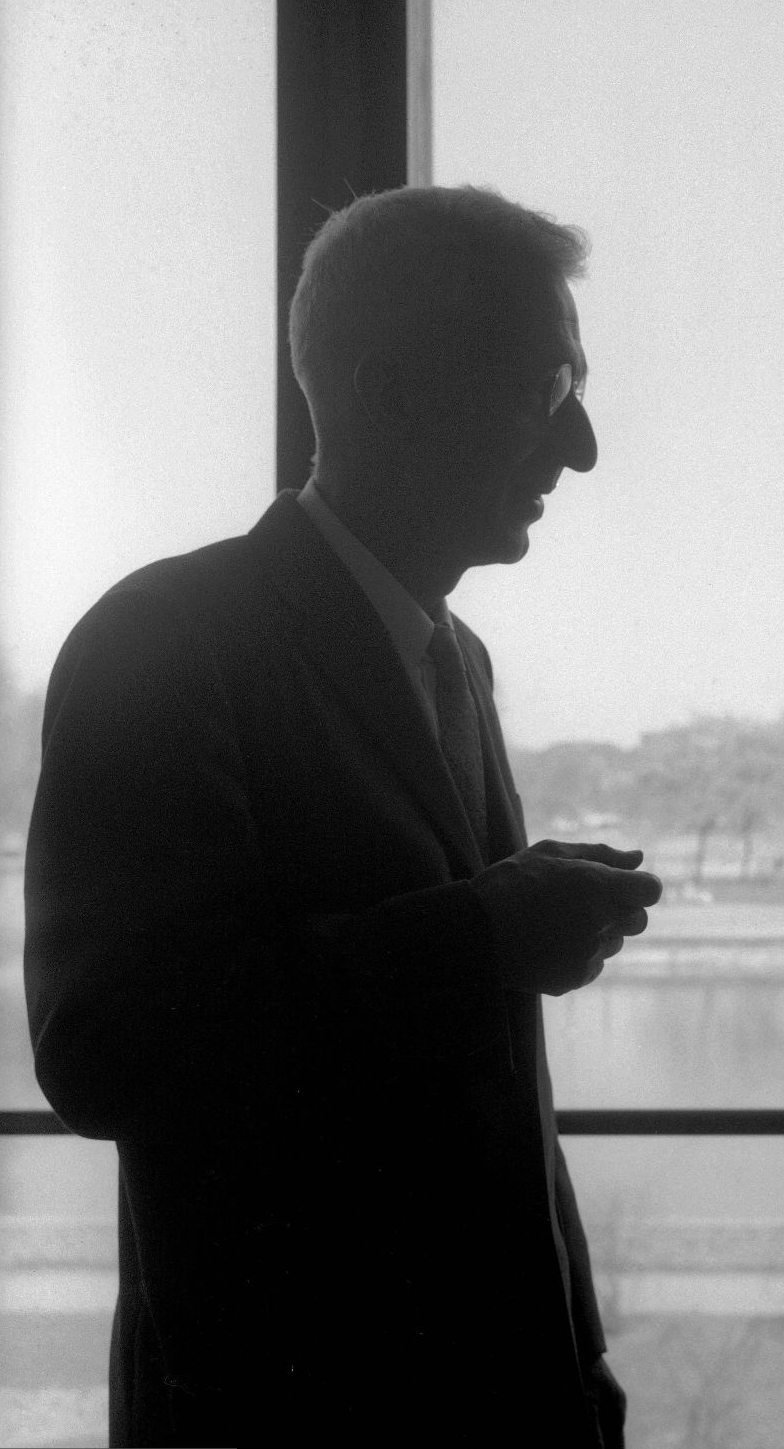
- Kenneth T. Rowe during a visit to Finland in 1960.
- Born: September 19, 1900
- Died: October 27, 1988 (aged 88)

Kenneth Thorpe Rowe (September 19, 1900 – October 27, 1988) was an influential professor of drama and playwriting. For decades, Rowe taught playwriting, Shakespeare and modern drama at the University of Michigan. There he had an enormous impact on students, from Arthur Miller (All My Sons, Death of a Salesman) to Lawrence Kasdan (Star Wars). His book Write That Play became a widely used college textbook for the teaching of playwriting.

Rowe earned his undergraduate and master's degrees at Rice University and taught at Rice and the University of Oregon before coming to Michigan in 1928. He was a guest lecturer at many schools, including the University of Washington, the New School Dramatic Workshop, Columbia University, and Yale. During World War II he served as chairman of War Activities for the American Educational Theater Association and as consultant to numerous government agencies, including the Departments of Treasury and War. According to the Bentley Library at Michigan, which holds Rowe's papers from that era, his government consulting focused on "the use of drama as a propaganda tool to raise morale and to define America's goals" during the war.

== Works ==
In 1939, Rowe published Write That Play which dealt with fundamental topics related to the process of writing a play, including: What A Play Is; Finding Dramatic Material; Building The Play; Analysis of a Great Play; Characterization; Dialogue; and Scenarios and Revisions.

The signature of Rowe's written work was his patient explication of the role and impact of each part of a play's structure; his lucidity and insight were evident in his line-by-line analysis of sample plays such as Ibsen's A Doll's House. The passage of time has done little to diminish the book's value in helping a writer address the enduring practical issues involved in constructing a play. The book was re-published in the United States in 1944 and again in 1968.

In 1960 Rowe published A Theater in Your Head. The book's aim was to help readers of a play visualize a dramatic production, and it too dealt with Rowe's enduring fascination, the problems of appreciating dramatic structure. The author incorporated passages from the prompt-books of director Elia Kazan and actor John Gielgud and used them to illustrate how a production comes intimately to life. The theater historian and critic John Gassner said of A Theater in Your Head: “It is the most penetrating introduction to the drama as ‘theater’ on the stage and in the imagination that I have ever encountered.”

== Approach to playwriting ==
Rowe regarded playwriting not as a mystical experience, but as a craft that could be understood and analyzed. He had sharp insight into how a writer could construct a play with an eye toward the most effective development of plot and emotion. Across the span of six decades at Michigan, he taught and inspired many notable students, including Josh Greenfeld, Lawrence Kasdan, Dennis McIntyre, Robert McKee, Arthur Miller, Davi Napoleon (a.k.a. Davida Skurnick), Betty Smith, and Milan Stitt.

Rowe began his playwriting seminar by asking his students to read The Poetics by Aristotle, using the text to help students learn to identify the workings of classic structure. In Rowe's view, all successful plays built dramatically from an "attack" (the introduction of a conflict), through a "crisis," and finally to a "resolution." He applied his methods even to modern plays that were not unified in time and place; it was Rowe's contention that even non-realistic plays had the classic underlying structure.

Arthur Miller enrolled in Rowe's seminar in 1937. He later described learning from Rowe that the theater "was not a carousel one jumped onto but an instrument one had to learn to play." His early plays Honors at Dawn and The Grass Still Grows were written under Rowe's tutelage, and his teacher's influence was evident in the careful structural revisions that Miller made as he revised them over time. Honors at Dawn was recognized with a Hopwood Award at Michigan (1937), while The Grass Still Grows won the attention of a theatrical agent. Thus for Miller, Rowe became "a combination of critical judge and confidant," bringing together a unique "interest in the dynamics of play construction" with "his friendship, which meant much to me."

== Legacy ==
Kenneth Rowe's generosity to his students was well noted at Michigan. According to an article in Michigan Today, Rowe helped Arthur Miller in making his first steps in Broadway by connecting him with people Rowe knew personally in the theater world. When another of his students, Josh Greenfeld, graduated from Michigan, Rowe referred him to Arthur Miller.

Rowe’s student Robert A. Martin wrote his doctoral dissertation on Miller under Rowe’s direction and went on to edit The Theater Essays of Arthur Miller. For a 1982 collection, Martin asked Rowe to write a special essay-memoir, "Shadows Cast Before," in which Rowe recalled and analyzed Miller’s work as a student playwright at Michigan. As Rowe wrote in the opening passage of his essay: "The image of Arthur Miller as a student at the University of Michigan that recurs most frequently and vividly to my mind comes from the spring of 1938, his senior year....I was in my office at my desk....There was a knock on the door, slightly ajar for the spring weather, and I called "Come in." The door swung open, Arthur stepped inside and stopped at the foot of the steps, looking up, eyes glowing and face alight; and that is the picture that is in my mind, the moment before he announced, 'Professor Rowe, I've made a discovery!'" Martin and Miller opened the Theater Essays with the following joint dedication: "For Kenneth Thorpe Rowe--teacher, scholar, friend."

In 2016 the film historian and professor Frank Beaver published "Remembering Kenneth Rowe," an essay that recalled his years studying with and becoming friends with Rowe.

The University of Michigan named a special chair in Rowe's honor, the Kenneth T. Rowe Collegiate Professor of Dramatic Literature. As of 2013, the chair is held by drama specialist Enoch Brater, whose work also involves Arthur Miller's plays.
