= The Hudson Brothers =

American garage rock and pop group (late 1960s-1970s)

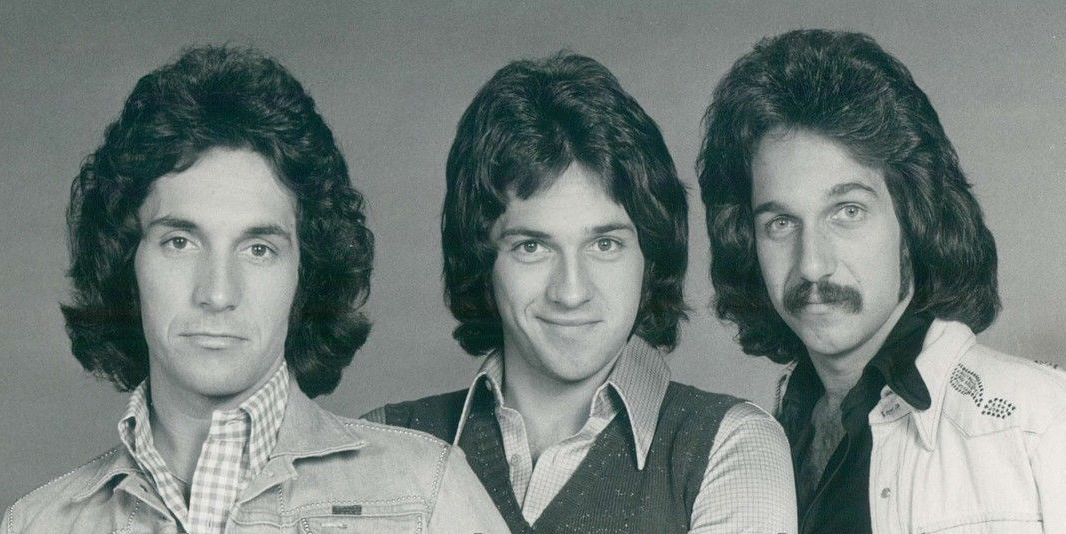
- Hudson Brothers in 1974, left to right: Bill, Brett, and Mark

Background information
- Also known as: My Sirs; The New Yorkers; Everyday Hudson; Hudson; The Hudsons
- Origin: Portland, Oregon, U.S.
- Genres: Pop; garage rock
- Years active: 1965–1981
- Labels: Scepter, Jerden, Warner Bros. Records, Decca, Lionel, Playboy, Rocket, Casablanca, Arista, Elektra, Columbia
- Past members: Bill Hudson; Brett Hudson; Mark Hudson

The Hudson Brothers were an American musical group formed in Portland, Oregon, consisting of brothers Bill, Brett and Mark Hudson. They were discovered by a record producer while recording music at a local studio, and offered a recording contract. After releasing several garage rock singles in the late 1960s as the New Yorkers, the group began releasing material under the names Everyday Hudson, and Hudson.

They garnered fame as teen idols in the 1970s after their prime-time series debuted as a summer replacement for The Sonny & Cher Comedy Hour in 1974. The resulting popularity led to their Saturday-morning half-hour sketch comedy series for CBS, The Hudson Brothers Razzle Dazzle Show, which ran from 1974 to 1975. They also released several hit singles during this time for producer Bernie Taupin, including "So You Are a Star" (1974), "Rendezvous" (1975), "Lonely School Year" (1975), and "Help Wanted" (1976).

== History ==
=== 1965–1972: Formation and early singles ===
The Hudson Brothers had their beginnings as a trio composed of teenage brothers Bill, Mark and Brett Hudson in the early 1960s. The three brothers had been raised in Portland, Oregon, by their Italian American mother who was also a singer and encouraged the boys to play music. Early on, the three brothers had formed a band known as the My Sirs.

After winning several local "battle of the bands"-type contests, the group recorded several songs at a local recording studio, where they received the attention of a local promoter, who offered them a contract promoting Chrysler automobiles. They were subsequently renamed The New Yorkers, after the Chrysler model of the same name. In early 1967, their song "Things Are Changin'" was issued on a promotional-only 45 for the Chrysler 1967 Go Show (b/w a song by another group, the Fury 4), after which they signed with Scepter. Their first Scepter 45 was issued in the spring of 1967, "When I'm Gone" b/w "You're Not My Girl" (SCE-12190) on Scepter Records, which became a radio hit in the Pacific Northwest. This was followed in August 1967 with the single "Seeds of Spring" b/w "Mr. Kirby" (SCE-12199). The B-side was favored by DJs and became a top 10 hit in the Portland area and did well in other regional markets but did not chart nationally. Their final Scepter 45 was "Show Me the Way to Love" b/w "Again" (SCE-12207) in autumn, 1967. To support the singles, the group toured with several popular music acts, such as Buffalo Springfield, The Supremes, Johnny Nash, and The Buckinghams. By October 1968, The New Yorkers had switched to Jerry Dennon's Pacific Northwest label Jerden Records and issued "Adrianne" (#906), following that up with "Land of Ur" (#908) in March 1969. Later in 1969 The New Yorkers also recorded the Harry Nilsson song "I Guess the Lord Must Be in New York City" (#32569) for Decca Records. The Scepter and Jerden recordings, excluding "You're Not My Girl" but including the previously unissued "Lazy Meadow," were included on the 1978 "cash-in" album, TV's The Hudson Brothers, issued on the First American label. (The New Yorkers, which recorded "Lonely" for Warner Bros. is not the same group.)

On Decca Records they changed their name to Everyday Hudson in early 1970, releasing "Laugh, Funny Funny" (later revived for their 1974 CBS summer replacement series) b/w "Love Is the Word" (#32634). For the release in spring 1971 of "The World Would Be a Little Bit Better" bw "Love Nobody" on Lionel Records (L-3211), their name was shortened to Hudson. They had one further release on Lionel issued only in Canada, "Straight Up and Tall" (an early version of the song they later re-recorded for the Rocket label) b/w "Enough." This name was also used in 1972 after switching to the newly re-activated Playboy Records, with the release of "Leavin' It's Over" (P-50001), (Billboard Bubbling Under Chart #110). The single made the top ten in some local markets, including Omaha, where it reached #8. When the group's self-titled debut album was released in 1972, the song was re-titled on the lyrics inside the LP as "Leave and It's Over". It was later reissued when Playboy was acquired by CBS. One further Playboy single was released only in Canada, with "Lovely Lady" as the A-side.

=== 1972–1979: Teen idols ===
One of the group's earliest appearances on television as The Hudson Brothers was in the summer of 1972, for the television game show What's My Line? In 1973, the group received the attention of producer Bernie Taupin, who signed them with Elton John's record label, The Rocket Record Company. Under the name Hudson, the US Rocket label released "If You Really Need Me" (MCA-40141), which was recorded in France and produced by Taupin and mixed by Andy Scott. The B-side featured two songs, "America" and "Fight Back", and the record was issued in an attractive full-color picture sleeve. In the UK, the same sleeve was used for a different A-side, "Straight Up and Tall," b/w "America" and "Fight Back". After the group's 1974 success on the Casablanca label, their complete 1973 Rocket LP, "Totally Out of Control," was issued, and another single was issued, "Be a Man" b/w "Sunday Driver" (MCA-40317), which bubbled under in Billboard. The LP did not include "America" or "Fight Back."

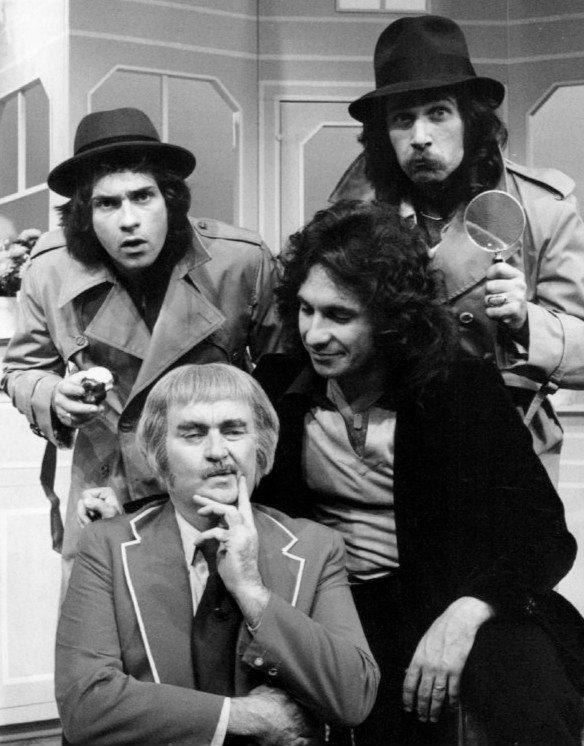
The Hudson Brothers and Bob Keeshan (bottom) on Captain Kangaroo, 1976

After the group appeared as guests of The Sonny Comedy Revue on ABC in early 1974, noted producer Chris Bearde was impressed by the brothers' stage presence and offered them their own variety hour on the CBS network for the summer slot vacated by The Sonny & Cher Comedy Hour. The Hudson Brothers Show aired Wednesday nights on CBS from July 31 to August 28, 1974. The show was so successful that CBS devised The Hudson Brothers Razzle Dazzle Show, which aired on Saturday mornings, from September 7, 1974, to August 30, 1975, in a half-hour format. The group's television exposure resulted in the brothers becoming teen idols.

Their first release as The Hudson Brothers came in September 1974 with their single "So You Are a Star" on Casablanca Records (NES 0108), which peaked on the Billboard charts at #21 in November 1974. The group's second studio album, Totally Out of Control (1974), was released through The Rocket Record Company, and charted at #179 on the Billboard 200 in December 1974. Their third studio album, Hollywood Situation, simultaneously peaked at #174.

They subsequently released the single "Coochie Coochie Coo" (NES 816) in 1975, which peaked on the Bubbling Under Chart at #108. The song was taken from the Hollywood Situation LP, but the single version featured added percussion and was backed with the non-LP track, "Me and My Guitar". They then re-signed with Rocket and scored another hit with "Rendezvous" (#26 U.S. Billboard Hot 100) from their fourth studio album, Ba-Fa. John Rockwell of The New York Times, reviewing one of the group's summer shows in 1975, wrote:

They make a hard rock sound and, at least in a club context, they try to project a raunchier image than television might lead one to expect... The result isn't entirely successful, however. The between songs routines still have a touch of slickness to them, and the comedy effort—although those in the audience who knew the television show seemed to find them uproarious—sounded lame indeed. Musically, this is a fully confident, competent group, capable of knocking out imitations of the nineteen‐fifties or original material with no embarrassment at all.

Ba-Fa charted on the Billboard 200 at #176 in January 1976. The follow-up single, "Lonely School Year," charted in Billboard at #60, but their next Rocket single, "Spinning the Wheel (With The Girl You Love)," failed to chart. They then signed with Arista Records in 1976. Their first Arista single, "Help Wanted," peaked at #70 on the Billboard charts. It appears that a follow-up single, "She's a Rebel" (a remake of the Crystals' "He's a Rebel" with the genders switched), was planned for release, as they promoted it on several TV appearances, but the 45 was never released. A second Arista single, "I Don't Wanna Be Lonely," failed to chart and was backed with the non-LP track, "Pauline," which the Hudsons wrote and produced. Their final Arista 45, "The Runaway," also failed to chart. The three then starred alongside Bob Monkhouse in Bonkers!, a half-hour syndicated comedy show in 1978, produced in Britain by ATV (Jack Burns was its American producer) and distributed by ITC. The same year, they each appeared together in the comedy film Zero to Sixty (1978).

=== 1980–1981: Final album and dissolution ===
In 1980, the group reverted their name back to Hudson after they signed with Elektra Records. (The "Hudsons" which recorded for Columbia in 1983 is not the same group.) They engaged in a promotional tour for their debut Elektra single, "Annie," but it did not chart, nor did their final Elektra single, "Afraid to Love," despite featuring a Linda Ronstadt duet vocal which was not credited on the label. The brothers guest-starred on an episode of The Love Boat in 1980 ("Not So Fast, Gopher; Haven't We Met Before?/Foreign Exchange"). Their final studio album, Damn Those Kids (1980), was released by Elektra. In 1983, the three brothers appeared in Hysterical, a horror-comedy film.

== Legacy ==
Richard Unterberger of AllMusic wrote of the group: "Those that remember the Hudson Brothers usually think of them as a bubblegum act of sorts, due to the fact that they hosted some comedy-variety TV shows in the mid-'70s. But they were in fact a real group, extremely Anglophile in orientation, with heavy debts to the Beatles and Beach Boys, and occasional hints of the Kinks."

The long (2:45) introduction to The Hudson Brothers Razzle Dazzle Show was featured in 2021 in the Family Guy episode "And Then There's Fraud".

== Members ==
Principal

- Bill Hudson – guitar, vocals (1964–1981)
- Brett Hudson – bass, vocals (1964–1981)
- Mark Hudson – drums, keyboards, vocals (1964–1981)
- Kent Fillmore – guitar (1964–1967)
- Bob Haworth – guitar (1968–1970)

Backing band (1978–1981)

- Barry Pullman – synthesizers
- Phil Reed – guitar
- Michael Parker – keyboards
- Craig Krampf – drums, percussion
