= Hollywood Animal Crusaders =

American television documentary

Hollywood Animal Crusaders is an American television documentary that captured live-action animal cruelty investigations by actor turned animal activist Chris DeRose and his organization, Last Chance for Animals. It premiered on the Animal Planet network on June 14, 1999.

The group faced pet theft, abuse of circus elephants, horses sold for slaughter, and companion animal neglect. Viewers saw the emotional reaction of the investigation team as they struggled through difficult situations. Hollywood Animal Crusaders was said to be "the first mainstream television show dedicated to animals and their rights."

== Notable guest stars ==
The special was also notable because between segments, DeRose called on old friends, now celebrities, who talked with him about the rights of animals. These Hollywood stars included:

- John Travolta, who commended him for his important work in animal advocacy,
- Cher, who described her relationship with a special elephant, and
- Don Johnson, who spoke of the importance of spaying and neutering.
- Esai Morales and Greg Louganis joined the team during investigations.
- Baywatch star Alexandra Paul, rock star Bret Michaels and entrepreneur John Paul DeJoria also made appearances.

DeRose's team included Poison drummer and noted animal activist Rikki Rockett, actress Kari Whitman and artist David Silverstone.

The special was directed by Burt Kearns and produced by Alison Holloway and Brian Wry through Good Story Productions.

== Ark Trust & Genesis Awards ==
The night before its television premiere, the special was screened at Paramount Studios' main theater. The audience of 500 included entertainers, industry representatives, professionals, the show's production team, and supporters and friends of Last Chance For Animals. Emcee for the evening was Gretchen Wyler, former Broadway actress, and founder, with her group, The Ark Trust, the industry's prestigious Genesis Awards, recognizing individuals in the media who have produced works with strong pro-animal messages.

The Ark Trust awarded Kearns an honorable mention plaque as director at the 2000 Genesis Awards.
