= Marlon Brando: Hollywood Rebel =

2024 nonfiction book by Burt Kearns

- Author: Burt Kearns
- Genre: Biography, Film criticism
- Publisher: Rowman & Littlefield
- Publication date: 2024
- ISBN: 9781493072507

Marlon Brando: Hollywood Rebel is a 2024 nonfiction book by Burt Kearns that discusses the continuing cultural influence of the actor and activist Marlon Brando.

Donald Liebenson wrote in The Saturday Evening Post:

Kearns is usually drawn to cultural figures who fly under the radar (his last book was Lawrence Tierney: Hollywood’s Real Life Tough Guy). That’s not Brando, about whom much has been written. But Kearns is also drawn to cultural outliers, and Brando profoundly changed the art of acting (even if he was dismissive in interviews about his own profession). The challenge, Kearns told The Saturday Evening Post, was to find a fresh angle on this much chronicled artist enshrined in myth and legend. Marlon Brando: Hollywood Rebel is not another biography, but more an examination of Brando’s enduring influence 100 years after his birth and 20 years after his death.

Writing in the Los Angeles Times, Chris Vognar called the book “a worthy addition to the Brando bookshelf, largely because the author picks an idea and never loses sight of it, even as he fans across multiple disciplines to explore the idea. This is a book about how one facet of one man captured in one image from one film can send ripples through the world.”

Library Journal called the book “an entertaining and enlightening study of Brando’s impressive influence.”
