= Nancy Snyder =

American actress

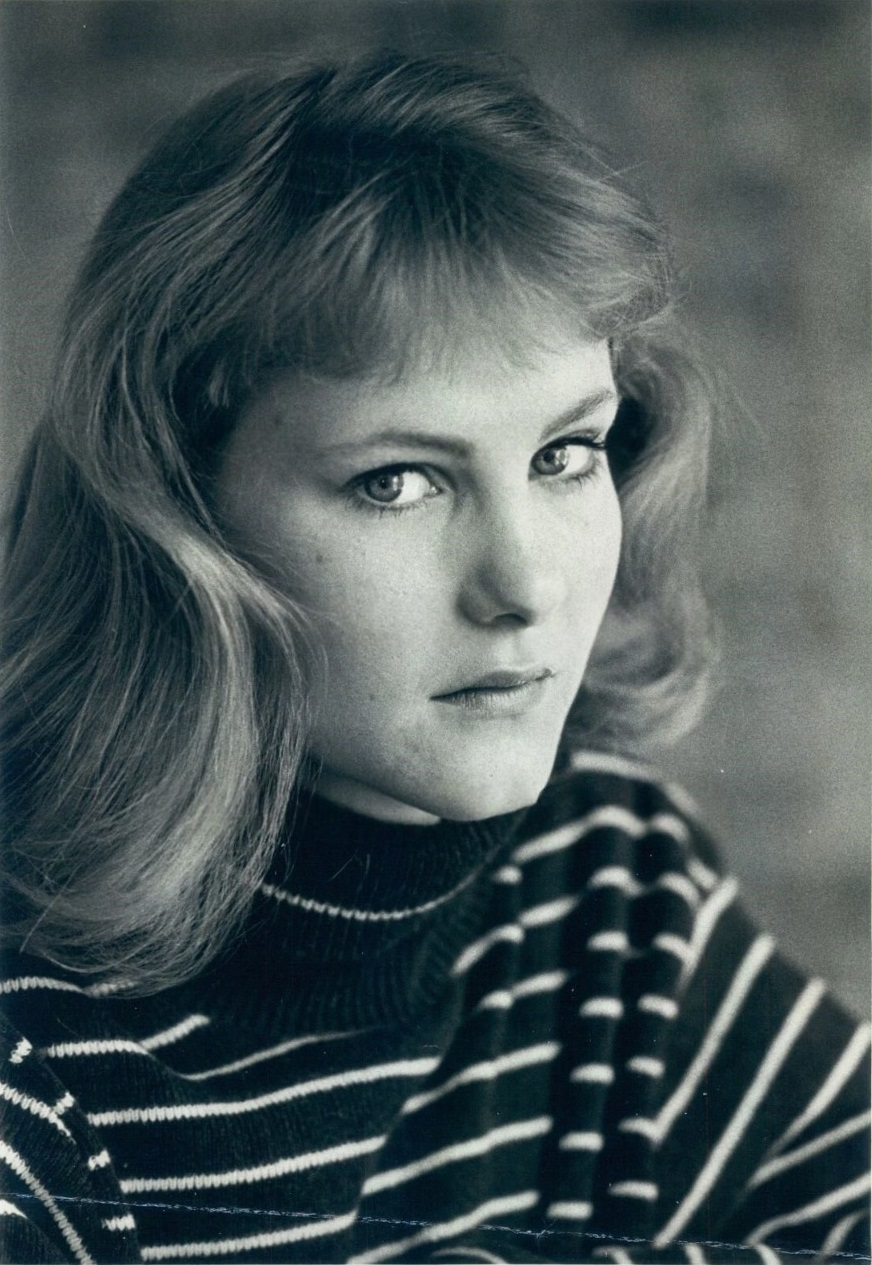
- Snyder in 1976
- Occupation: Actress
- Years active: 1976–present
- Spouse: Stephen Schnetzer (divorced)
- Children: 2, including Ben Schnetzer

Nancy Snyder is an American actress who won the Clarence Derwent Award in 1976 and the Outer Critics Circle Best Actress award in the 1977–78 season.

== Life and career ==
Snyder is the daughter of Idelle (née Bonham) and John Marshall Snyder Sr., a director of research. She opened in Jules Feiffer's comedy, Knock Knock, and went on to win the Clarence Derwent Award for the "most promising female [actor] on the metropolitan scene" for the 1975–76 season.

She won Best Actress in the 1977–78 season in the annual awards given by the Outer Critics Circle for her role in Fifth of July. From 1978–1983, she was a regular on the ABC soap opera, One Life to Live, playing a hooker with a heart of gold, Katrina Karr. She appeared in the Lanford Wilson play, Angels Fall, in 1982, which was nominated for a Tony Award, and in Wilson's Book of Days at the Signature Theater in 2002.

== Personal life ==
Snyder met actor Stephen Schnetzer while they were both on One Life to Live (he played Marcello Salta). They were married on March 18, 1982 and had two sons. They are now divorced. Their younger son, Ben Schnetzer, is also an actor.

== Filmography ==
=== Stage ===
- The Gambler by Ugo Betti
- Tartuffe by Molière Role: Marianne
- Knock, Knock by Jules Feiffer (1976) Role: Joan of Arc
- Mrs Murray's Farm by Roy London (1976) Role: Barbara Warren
- The Farm by David Storey (1976) Role: Branda
- Fifth of July by Lanford Wilson (1978)
- Eyes on the Sky by Tom Cone (1978) Role: Elenore Atwater
- Angels Fall by Lanford Wilson (1982) Role: Vita Harris
- Book of Days by Lanford Wilson (2002)

=== Film ===
- The Kirlian Witness (1978) Role: Rilla
- Texas Rangers (2000) Role: Production Assistant
- My Boss's Daughter (2003) Role: Assistant Director

=== Television ===
- One Life to Live (TV series) Role: Katrina Karr
- For Richer, For Poorer (TV series) Role: Colleen Griffin
- Father's Choice (TV movie) Role: Assistant Director
- Black Top (2001) (TV movie) Role: Office Assistant
- Law & Order (2003) (TV series) Role: CeCe Vandeveer
