= Lawrence Tierney: Hollywood's Real-Life Tough Guy =

Biography of Lawrence Tierney

Lawrence Tierney: Hollywood's Real-Life Tough Guy is the first biography of the notorious and legendary screen actor Lawrence Tierney, written by Burt Kearns and published on 6 December 2022 by the University Press of Kentucky, as part of its Screen Classics series.

The author traces the life of the film noir antihero from his birth in Brooklyn, New York in 1919, through his breakthrough role in the 1945 film, Dillinger, his clash with Quentin Tarantino on the set of the film Reservoir Dogs near the end of his film career, to his final public appearances. The book draws on the writings of Hollywood reporters and gossip columnists who first reported on Tierney's antics, and exclusive interviews with surviving colleagues, friends, family members―and victims.

Donald Liebenson wrote on the Roger Ebert website that "the book takes full measure of the prolific character actor, whose bumpy six-decade career was marked by bouts of erratic behavior, pugnacious on-set antics, and alcohol abuse. ...Kearns etches an unforgettable portrait of an actor whose most significant and most challenging role was of himself." Film critic and historian Leonard Maltin wrote that "Kearns has dug deep and crafted a colorful account of the actor's tumultuous life and career."
