= Step by Step (1946 film) =

- Theatrical release poster
- Directed by: Phil Rosen
- Screenplay by: Stuart Palmer
- Story by: George Callahan
- Produced by: Sid Rogell
- Starring: Lawrence Tierney; Anne Jeffreys; Lowell Gilmore; Myrna Dell; Harry Harvey, Sr. Addison Richards
- Cinematography: Frank Redman
- Edited by: Robert Swink
- Music by: Paul Sawtell
- Production company: RKO Pictures
- Distributed by: RKO Pictures
- Release date: August 30, 1946
- Running time: 62 minutes
- Country: United States
- Language: English

Step by Step is a 1946 American drama film directed by Phil Rosen, written by Stuart Palmer, and starring Lawrence Tierney, Anne Jeffreys, Lowell Gilmore, Myrna Dell, Harry Harvey, Sr. and Addison Richards. It was released on August 30, 1946, by RKO Pictures.

== Plot ==
A secretary, Evelyn Smith, lands a job working for Remmy, a Senator. Senator Remmy is expecting to receive a list of German agents working in the United States from Colonel Blackton, a plainsclothes government agent from Washington, DC. Expecting Colonel Blackton at his isolated home on the Malibu coast, he sends Ms. Smith to the beach so he can receive Col Blackton alone. At the beach, she encounters Johnny Christopher, a passerby who stopped to admire her. Johnny just returned from active duty in the Pacific during WWII as a Marine sergeant. He and his war dog, Bazuka, flirt with Evelyn who smiles and then returns to Remmy's home.

Johnny locks himself out of his car, so on foot (and in his bathing suit) he makes his way to Remmy's nearby home to get a phone and help with his locked car. A strange woman answers the door and claims to be Evelyn, concerning Johnny. The more he snoops around, the more he is convinced that something is wrong. A police officer comes at his request and, at the house, impostors claiming to be the senator, his driver and his secretary convince the policeman that Johnny is mentally disturbed, perhaps because of his war experience.

Johnny sneaks back into Senator Remmy's home, donning clothes he finds laying around. The impostors, who are enemy agents, have tied up Remmy, the real Evelyn and the senator's chauffeur. They are searching for a list in the Senator's possession, but Johnny accidentally ends up with possession of it by donning the leather jacket worn by Colonel Blackton. The chauffeur is tied up, the Senator is unconscious and the government operative, James Blackton is dead. The chauffeur escapes and brings in the police and the coroner. The Senator recovers, and the police are sure it is an inside job, with Evelyn and Johnny as the prime suspects.

Fleeing for their lives, Evelyn and Johnny end up at a motel run by Capt. Caleb Simpson and gain his trust. Unbeknownst to them, the enemy agents are also staying at the motel in another cabin. Evelyn and Johnny track down the chauffeur and try to get information about the list from him. The chauffeur is about to admit his role in admitting the enemy agents into the house to Evelyn and Johnny, when one of the enemy agents shoots him through an open window. The enemy agents make a quick get-away, and Capt. Simpson helps Evelyn and Johnny escape from the police.

The enemy agents connect Johnny, Bazuka and the borrowed clothes. The spies decide the list must be in the jacket and then discover Evelyn and Johnny's hiding place at the motel. Johnny tells them he disposed of the jacket in the sea. The enemy agents knock out Johnny and Evelyn. After finding the jacket in the back of Johnny's car, and the list in the jacket lining, the enemy agents plan to dispose of Evelyn and Johnny. They drive off with Johnny in the trunk and Evelyn wrapped up in the back seat. The police arrive and search the motel. They find a letter Johnny had dictated to the Senator taken down in shorthand by Evelyn explaining true situation. Captain Simpson helps them believe Johnny’s explanation by mentioning fresh fish discarded by the enemy agents which could not have been caught in the salt water ocean.

When the fleeing agents are stopped at a police barricade, a cry from Evelyn, who has regained consciousness, alerts the police officer. The enemy agents shoot the police officer; and drive on, knocking over the barricade. From the trunk, Johnny signals SOS with the tail lights in Morse code continuously.

Arriving at a dock, the enemy agents plan to scuttle a boat to drown an unconscious Evelyn and Johnny aboard, while leaving in an arriving boat with other agents who had been waiting off shore. At the boathouse, Johnny breaks loose and fights with the two male enemy agents and Evelyn takes care of the female agent. The police arrive with Captain Simpson to place all the enemy agents under arrest after a gun battle. The police explain that Johnny’s taillight SOS helped locate them.

In the final scene, Evelyn and Johnny marry with Bazuka and Capt. Caleb Simpson in tow.

== Cast ==
- Lawrence Tierney as Johnny Christopher
- Anne Jeffreys as Evelyn Smith
- Lowell Gilmore as Von Dorn
- Myrna Dell as Gretchen
- Harry Harvey, Sr. as Senator Remmy
- Addison Richards as James Blackton
- Ray Walker as Agent Jorgensen
- Jason Robards, Sr. as Bruckner
- George Cleveland as Captain Caleb Simpson
