= Oliver Hudson =

American actor

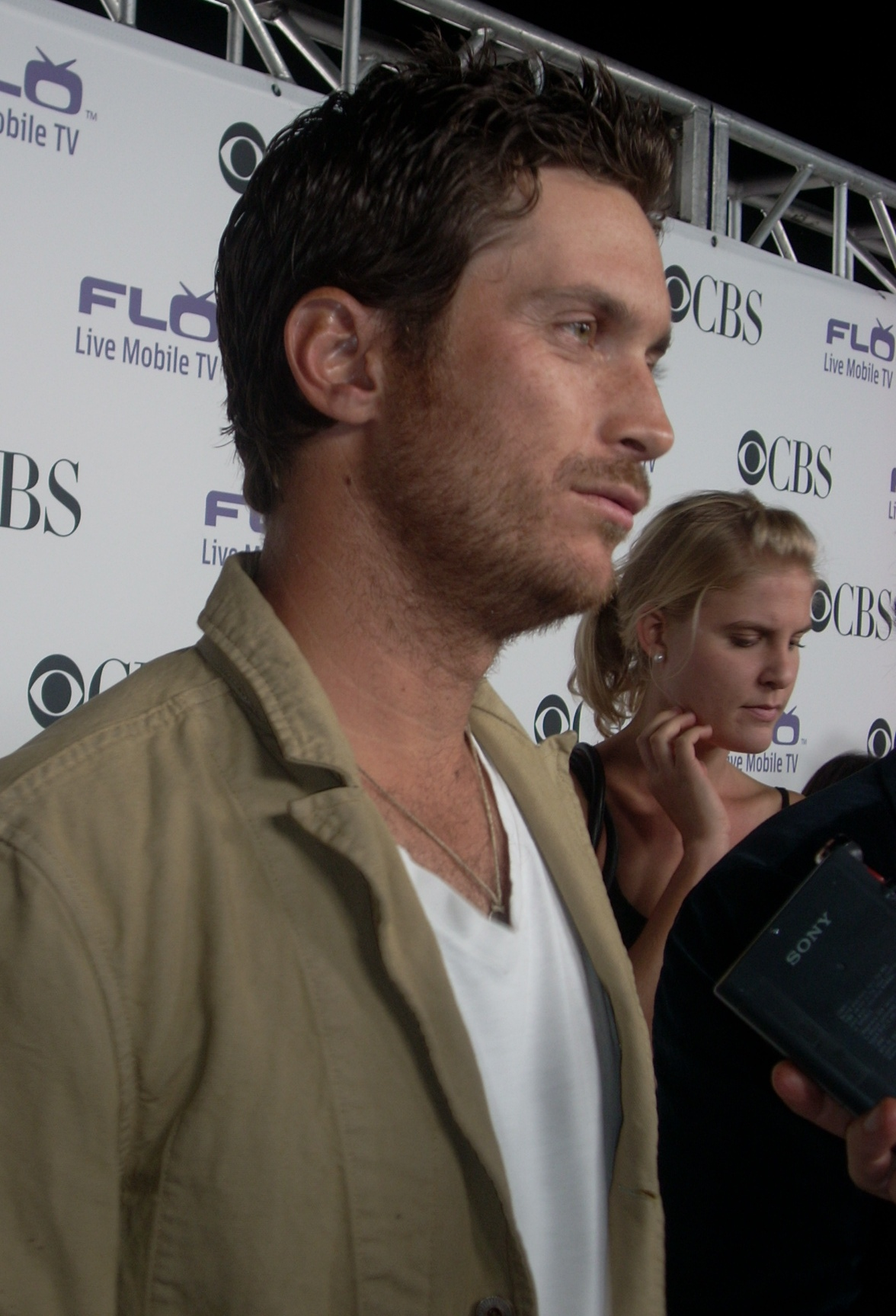
- Hudson in 2008
- Born: Oliver Rutledge Hudson; September 7, 1976 (age 50); Los Angeles, California, U.S.
- Occupation: Actor
- Years active: 1999–present
- Spouse: Erinn Bartlett (m. 2006)
- Children: 3
- Parent(s): Bill Hudson; Goldie Hawn
- Relatives: Kate Hudson (sister); Wyatt Russell (half-brother); Mark Hudson (uncle); Brett Hudson (uncle); Sarah Hudson (cousin)

Oliver Rutledge Hudson (born September 7, 1976) is an American actor. He is known for his roles as Adam Rhodes in the CBS comedy series Rules of Engagement (2007–2013), Jeff Fordham on the ABC musical drama series Nashville (2013–2015) and Wes Gardner in the Fox horror comedy Scream Queens (2015–2016). He appeared as one of the main cast members of the ABC sitcom Splitting Up Together (2018–2019), produced by Ellen DeGeneres. In 2022, he played FBI agent Garrett Miller in Fox's The Cleaning Lady.

== Early life ==
Hudson was born in Los Angeles to Academy Award-winning actress Goldie Hawn and musician Bill Hudson. After his parents divorced in 1980, he and his sister, actress Kate Hudson, were raised in Colorado by their mother and her partner, actor Kurt Russell. He has four half-siblings: Emily and Zachary, from his biological father's marriage to actress Cindy Williams; Lalania, from another of his father's relationships in 2006; and Wyatt, from his mother's relationship with Kurt Russell. He also has a step-sibling, Boston, from Kurt Russell's marriage to Season Hubley.

Hudson is of Italian descent via his father; English and German descent through his maternal grandfather, and Hungarian Jewish descent through his maternal grandmother.

== Career ==
Hudson appeared opposite his mother in the 1999 comedy film The Out-of-Towners and later starred in several teen movies, such as The Smokers and Going Greek. In 2002, he played the lead role of The WB comedy series My Guide to Becoming a Rock Star. Hudson also appeared in a recurring role opposite Katie Holmes as her love interest, Eddie Doling, in sixteen episodes of Dawson's Creek from 2002 to 2003.

Hudson starred in The WB series The Mountain from 2004 to 2005; the show was canceled after 13 episodes. In 2006, he starred in horror films The Breed and Black Christmas. He also starred with Claire Forlani in the Lifetime movie Carolina Moon in 2007. From 2007 to 2013, Hudson starred as Adam Rhodes in the CBS sitcom Rules of Engagement (2007–2013). In 2013, Hudson was cast in the recurring role of Jeff Fordham for the second season on the ABC drama series Nashville. Hudson later was promoted to series regular for the third season.

In 2015, Hudson was cast as a series regular on the horror comedy anthology series Scream Queens playing Wes Gardner, the father of a college sorority pledge member. Also in 2015, Hudson and his sister, Kate Hudson, launched FL2, a men's activewear line and subsidiary of Fabletics. In 2017, Hudson was cast in the lead role of Martin in the ABC sitcom Splitting Up Together, which premiered in 2018. The series was cancelled after two seasons.

On September 22, 2019, he became the first panelist to win the Doris Award on the ABC version of To Tell the Truth. Through 2022, he starred as FBI agent Garrett Miller, in the first two seasons of Fox's The Cleaning Lady.

Hudson will play in the lead role of Will in the CBS comedy pilot The Three of Us which was created by Frank Pines. The release date has not yet been announced. More recently, he was attached to developing World's Best Dad via Jupiter Entertainment, after signing a first look deal with his production company Bronco Productions.

== Personal life ==
Hudson married actress Erinn Bartlett on June 9, 2006, in Cabo San Lucas, Mexico. The couple have three children: two sons, Wilder Brooks Hudson (b. August 23, 2007) and Bodhi Hawn Hudson (b. March 19, 2010), and a daughter, Rio Laura Hudson (b. July 18, 2013).

== Filmography ==
=== Film ===
Year	Film	Role	Notes
1999	Kill the Man	Revolutionary #1	
1999	The Out-of-Towners	Alan Clark	
2000	Rocket's Red Glare	Hank Baker	
2000	The Smokers	David	
2001	Going Greek	Ziegler	
2002	New Best Friend	Josh	
2003	As Virgins Fall	Corky Stevens	
2005	Mr. Dramatic	Mr. Dramatic	Short film
2006	The Breed	John	
2006	Black Christmas	Kyle Autry	
2008	Strange Wilderness	TJ / Animal Handler	
2013	Grown Ups 2	Kyle	
2014	Walk of Shame	Kyle	
2016	Journey Back to Christmas	Jake	
2018	The Christmas Chronicles	Doug Pierce	
2021	Injustice	Plastic Man	Voice
2025	Happy Gilmore 2	Harley	
2025	A Merry Little Ex-Mas	Everett	

=== Television ===
Year	Title	Role	Notes
2002	My Guide to Becoming a Rock Star	Jace Darnell	Series regular (11 episodes)
2002–2003	Dawson's Creek	Eddie Doling	Series Regular; Season 6 (16 episodes)
2004–2005	The Mountain	David Carver Jr.	Series regular (13 episodes)
2006	10.5: Apocalypse	Will Malloy	Movie
2007	The Weekend	Julian	Unsold TV Pilot
2007	Carolina Moon	Cade Lavelle	Movie
2007–2013	Rules of Engagement	Adam Rhodes	Series regular (100 episodes)
2013–2015	Nashville	Jeff Fordham	Recurring: seasons 2, 4; regular: season 3 (40 episodes)
2015–2016	Scream Queens	Weston "Wes" Gardner	Main role: season 1 (12 episodes); Recurring: season 2 (2 episodes)
2016	Journey Back to Christmas	Sheriff	Hallmark Movie
2018	Medal of Honor	Etchberger	Episode: "Richard Etchberger"
2018	The Guest Book	Paul	Episode: "Someplace Other Than Here"
2018–2019	Splitting Up Together	Martin	Main role (26 episodes)
2022	The Cleaning Lady	Garrett Miller	Main role
2023	And Just Like That...	Lyle	Guest: season 2 (2 episodes)
2024	Unprisoned	Johnny	Episode: "The Legend of the Rollerblades"
2025	Gingerbread Land: The Biggest Little Holiday Competition	Host	3 Episodes
2026	Running Point	Oliver McShay	Episode: "Gordons vs. McShays"
2026	Special Forces: World's Toughest Test	Himself	Contestant; season 5
TBD	The Three of Us	Will	Main role
