= Jeff Abraham =

American publicist

Jeff Abraham is an American publicist, comedy historian, and author. His only book—The Show Won't Go On: The Most Shocking, Bizarre, and Historic Deaths of Performers Onstage—was written with Burt Kearns, and it was published on September 3, 2019, by Chicago Review Press.

== Career ==
As a publicist, Abraham has represented comedy projects and comedians, including George Carlin and David Brenner. He has been a research consultant to authors and documentarians, and his Abraham Comedy Archives, a voluminous comedy album collection, has been a resource to writers and filmmakers alike. He is a podcast and radio guest, and in 2022, he was featured in the Emmy award-winning HBO documentary series,George Carlin's American Dream.

Abraham has conducted interviews for The Archive of American Television and worked closely with the Paley Center for Media. He is on the advisory board of the National Comedy Center.

As an author and comedy historian, he is completing the first authorized biography of The Ritz Brothers.
