= The Show Won't Go On =

2019 non-fiction book by Jeff Abaraham and Burt Kearns

The Show Won't Go On: The Most Shocking, Bizarre, and Historic Deaths of Performers Onstage
- First edition
- Author: Jeff Abraham, Burt Kearns
- Publisher: Chicago Review Press
- ISBN: 978-1-64160-217-4

The Show Won't Go On: The Most Shocking, Bizarre, and Historic Deaths of Performers Onstage is a 2019 nonfiction book written by Jeff Abraham and Burt Kearns. It is the first comprehensive study of the phenomenon of performers who died onstage, or were stricken onstage and died soon after.

The book was published on 3 September 2019 by Chicago Review Press under its A Cappella Books imprint.

The Show Won't Go On covers the deaths of performers both famous and obscure, grouped into performing arts genres, including theatre, comedy, magic and escape artistry, dance, classical music, opera, rock 'n' roll, hip hop, country music, gospel music, jazz, international pop music, television, radio, social media, vaudeville and the circus. More than 200 cases are examined or cited, and the authors are keeping a tally of recent onstage deaths on the book's website.
