= The Kirlian Witness =

1979 American film

- Directed by: Jonathan Sarno
- Produced by: Jonathan Sarno
- Starring: Nancy Snyder; Nancy Boykin; Joel Colodner; Ted Le Plat; Lawrence Tierney; Maia Danziger
- Cinematography: João Fernandes
- Edited by: Len Dell'Amico; M. Edward Salier
- Music by: Harry Manfredini
- Production company: CNI Cinema
- Distributed by: Paramount Pictures
- Release date: June 14, 1979
- Running time: 75 minutes
- Country: United States
- Language: English

The Kirlian Witness is a 1979 American thriller/supernatural film written and directed by Jonathan Sarno. The film stars Nancy Snyder, Nancy Boykin, Joel Colodner, Ted Le Plat, Lawrence Tierney and Maia Danziger. The film was released on June 6, 1979, by Paramount Pictures.

== Plot ==
Rilla's sister, Laurie, is dead, murdered on the moonlit rooftop above her apartment. There are no clues and no fingerprints. Yet there is a "witness". If Rilla can communicate with it, she can expose a murderer, but that communication could cost her her marriage, her sanity and her life.

Laurie's childhood affinity for plant life had developed into a remarkable telepathic bond, one that she had been researching exhaustively. When she is murdered, the only "witness" is her favourite houseplant. Rilla insists that the plant holds the key to the killer's identity. The police are openly skeptical of her theory. So Rilla becomes a one-person private detective agency.

Through the use of Kirlian photography, - a type of X-Ray process that can reveal the psychological aura of its subject - she compiles persuasive evidence. Still, her obsessive investigation is alienating her husband and upsetting her life. Her own telepathic communication with the plant is triggering a series of terrifying dreams of her sister's death and what she cannot distinguish in the prophetic nightmares is the face of the murderer who is about to kill again.

== Cast ==
- Nancy Snyder as Rilla
- Nancy Boykin as Laurie
- Joel Colodner as Robert
- Ted Le Plat as Dusty
- Lawrence Tierney as Detective
- Maia Danziger as Claire

== Background ==
Among the wilder branches of pseudoscience to gain popularity during the 1970s was Kirlian photography, which supposedly allowed researchers to document emotional reactions from plants during exposure to stimuli. Kirlian photography is rumored to be the inspiration and basis for the film.
