= Cloud 9 (2006 film) =

2006 film by Harry Basil

- Film poster
- Directed by: Harry Basil
- Written by: Brett Hudson; Burt Kearns; Albert S. Ruddy
- Produced by: Burt Kearns; Andre Morgan; Albert S. Ruddy
- Starring: Burt Reynolds; D.L. Hughley; Paul Rodriguez; Angie Everhart
- Cinematography: Michael Goi
- Edited by: Rick Tuber
- Music by: Eric Amdahl
- Production companies: Frozen Pictures; The Ruddy Morgan Organization
- Distributed by: 20th Century Fox Home Entertainment
- Release date: January 3, 2006
- Running time: 93 minutes
- Country: United States
- Language: English

Cloud 9 is a 2006 American direct-to-DVD sports comedy film starring Burt Reynolds that was written and produced by Brett Hudson, Burt Kearns and Albert S. Ruddy. It was the last comedy in which Reynolds reprised and updated his role as the charming rascal made legendary in films like The Longest Yard and Smokey and the Bandit.

The film was never released to cinemas; instead, it went straight to DVD by 20th Century Fox Home Entertainment on January 3, 2006, and distributed on DVD around the world in territories including India, Japan, Poland, Brazil, Greece and Thailand.

== Plot ==
A down and out sports promoter living in a trailer in Malibu, California, turns his luck around after he has the brainstorm of starting up a beach volleyball team composed of strippers.

== Cast ==
- Burt Reynolds as Billy Cole
- D.L. Hughley as Tenspot
- Paul Rodriguez as Wong/Juan
- Angie Everhart as Julie
- Paul Wesley as Jackson Fargo
- Gabrielle Reece as Christina Hansen
- Katheryn Winnick as Olga
- Marnette Patterson as Crystal
- Kenya Moore as Champagne
- Patricia De Leon as Corazon
- Gary Busey as himself
- Tony Danza as himself
- Tom Arnold as himself
- Bruce Bruce as himself
- Luis Chávez as Carlos
- Rick Overton as Buckner
- Pat Finn as Big Dan Weiner
- Jeff Altman as Drunk Lawyer
- Chris Coppola as Chris
- Ken Garito as Tommy Z

== Production ==
D.L. Hughley and Paul Wesley both spoke of Burt Reynolds's generosity. Wesley said that Reynolds invited him to his home for dinner to listen to acting legends swap stories.

== Reception ==
On the review aggregator website Rotten Tomatoes, 67% of 6 critics' reviews are positive.

Scott Weinberg of DVDTalk.com wrote, "Cloud 9 is every bit as atrocious as its DVD case plainly implies. Worse than that, actually."

== Sources ==
- Cloud 9 Oscar connections
- "Cloud 9 nails immigration issue"
- Qwipster's review of Cloud 9
- Photo gallery of Cloud 9 releases around the world
- Cloud 9 movie trailer
- Making of Cloud 9 DVD featurette: "Burt Reynolds Fight Club: "Directing A Rumble"
- Editing Cloud 9
- On Cloud 9: A conversation with Brett Hudson & Burt Kearns
