= Zero to Sixty =

1978 film by Don Weis

- Directed by: Don Weis
- Written by: Judith Bustany; Darren McGavin; W. Lyle Richardson; Peg Shirley
- Produced by: Kathie Browne
- Starring: Darren McGavin; Sylvia Miles; Joan Collins; Denise Nickerson; Dick Martin
- Cinematography: Donald H. Birnkrant
- Edited by: Dann Cahn; Jack Peluso
- Music by: John Beal
- Production companies: First Artists; Grandmet Productions
- Distributed by: Warner Bros.
- Release date: June 23, 1978
- Running time: 101 minutes
- Country: United States
- Language: English

Zero to Sixty is a 1978 American comedy film directed by Don Weis and starring Darren McGavin, Sylvia Miles, Joan Collins, Denise Nickerson, and Dick Martin. The film was released on June 23, 1978, and was later reviewed by TV Guide, which called Darren McGavin "fun to watch" in the film, but noted the premise was brought to the screen six years later in a different film, Repo Man.

== Plot ==
Michael Nolan (McGavin) finds himself down on his luck following his divorce settlement, which has left him with nothing. During the repossession of his car, he makes chase all the way to the auto repossession company. His persistence impresses the owner, who hires him on the spot. Nolan is then teamed up with Larry, a 16-year-old experienced repo agent. As Nolan settles into his new career, he continually finds himself troubled by women, angry car owners, and more.

== Cast ==
- Darren McGavin as Michael Nolan
- Sylvia Miles as Flo Ames
- Joan Collins as Gloria Martine
- Denise Nickerson as "Larry" Wilde
- Dick Martin as Arthur Dunking
- Bill Hudson as Eddie
- Brett Hudson as Harry
- Mark Hudson as Sammy
- Vito Scotti as Benny
- Lorraine Gary as Billy-Jon
- David Huddleston as Harold Finch
- Gordon MacRae as Officer Joe
- Lyle Waggoner as Gay Bar Bartender
