= Tabloid Baby =

1999 book by Burt Kearns

- Author: Burt Kearns
- Language: English
- Genre: Memoir
- Publication date: 1999

Tabloid Baby is a 1999 memoir and exposé by veteran journalist and television news producer Burt Kearns detailing his years as producer of the leading tabloid television shows of the 1990s: A Current Affair and Hard Copy. Published shortly before broadcast news was displaced by cable, the book is notable for its argument that “tabloid television” was co-opted by network news shows such as CBS’s 48 Hours which premiered in 1988 and NBC's Dateline which premiered in 1992, as well as demonstrating the emerging audience psychology that would lead to the explosion of reality shows in the 2000s and the openly subjective reporting that would find its apotheosis in Fox News and MSNBC on cable.

Tabloid Baby was described by former A Current Affair host Maury Povich as "The Bible" (as in "Burt was there for the birthing of tabloid, he became the heart of the genre, and now he’s written the Bible") and by veteran CBS newsman and 60 Minutes correspondent Mike Wallace as "sad, funny, undeniably authentic"... telling "the tale of what befell too much of mainstream television news over the past couple of decades as the bad drove out the good."

In recent years, the term "tabloid baby" has been used to describe the current crop of television news producers, reporters and executives who were trained, or got their starts in, the tabloid television system.
