= THC Ministry =

Religion

The THC Ministry, founded by Roger Christie from the Religion of Jesus Church, is a religion which considers cannabis to be a sacrament. Members base their practices on what they see as an eclectic mixture of ancient wisdom, modern science, and the enlightening and healing properties of cannabis sacrament. Its mission includes "liberating the Cannabis plant and the minds of those who do and of those who do not revere it," and is actively involved in the legal and social discussions surrounding cannabis use in society. On July 8, 2010, Christie and 13 other individuals allegedly associated with the THC Ministry were indicted by a Federal grand jury in Honolulu on Marijuana Possession and Trafficking charges. Christie served four years in jail following an April 2014 sentencing, and was on probation until 2018.

== Beliefs ==
THC Ministry believes that "cultivation and enjoyment of cannabis sacrament is a fundamental human right provided by God and protected by the Constitution." It states cannabis is the original sacrament of Hebrew, Christian, Muslim, Hindu, Shinto, Buddhist, Rasta and more, and fulfills the prophesies to 'feed all our hungers'. It believes cannabis to be one of the main ingredients in the original Anointing Oil, as described in the Bible. Some members also believe it is the substance used in the burnt offerings at the altar and on special occasions throughout the Bible.

== History ==
THC Ministry, the abbreviated, popularized name for the original Hawai'i Ministry of Cannabis Sacrament and all of its chapters, was founded in June 2000 by Roger Christie in Hawaii. It is present in Australia, Canada, the Netherlands, the United Kingdom and many states of the United States, including Alabama, Arizona, California, Colorado, Florida, Illinois, Indiana, Iowa, Michigan, Missouri, Montana, Nebraska, Ohio, Oregon, Wyoming, Texas, and Tennessee with at least one other chapter forming in New York. It is an officially registered religion in many countries on different continents.

According to the THC Ministry, identification of cannabis specifically as an ingredient of the holy anointing oil can be found in the Torah (Five Books of Moses), Exodus 30:23; contrary to the translation of the Septuagint and supported by both Aramaic translations (the Targum and the Peshitta).

The Hebrew Bible possibly mentions cannabis in Exodus 30:23 where God commands Moses to make a holy oil of myrrh, cinnamon, qěnēh bośem and cassia to anoint the Ark of the Covenant and the Tabernacle (and thus God's Temple in Jerusalem). The Biblical Hebrew term qěnēh bośem (קְנֵה בֹּשֶׂם), possibly derived from Sumerian kanubi, literally "reed of balm", probably refers to cannabis according to some etymologists, but is more commonly thought to be lemon grass, calamus, or even sweet cane, due to widespread translation issues.

Notably, the specific anointing oil in question is a special herbal formula that functions as a kind of polish and fragrance for the Ark and Tabernacle, and the Bible forbids its manufacture and use to anoint people (Exodus 30:31-33) with the exception of the Aaronic priesthood (Exodus 30:30).

In Aryeh Kaplan's contemporary English translation of the Five Books, "The Living Torah", he includes a picture of the hemp plant as an illustration (p. 442).

A judge in Colorado ruled that a man's belief that marijuana was a sacrament did not rise to the level of religion and ordered him to pay $450 in fines and costs and serve 15 hours of community service as a sentence.

== See also ==
- Religious use of cannabis
- Cannabis (drug)
- Charas
- entheogen
