= Mods & Rockers Film Festival =

The Mods & Rockers Film Festival was a Los Angeles film festival that celebrated rock culture. It was presented by the non-profit cultural organization American Cinematheque annually from 1999 to 2010, with the exception of 2004.

The festival was founded in 1999 by humorist/producer Martin Lewis and Cinematheque programming director Dennis Bartok, who jointly produced the event through 2005. After Bartok's departure from the organization, his successor as programmer, Chris Desjardins, continued producing the festival with Lewis. The festival took place in Los Angeles each summer at the American Cinematheque’s two theaters: Grauman's Egyptian Theatre in Hollywood and the Aero Theatre in Santa Monica.

The festival was originally a celebration of 1960s pop culture, and presented British and American films made in that decade – especially those that reflected the more exuberant aspects of the 1960s. The festival title was inspired by the name given to the two warring British youth subcultures prevalent in the early to mid-1960s - the mods and rockers. The festival later started showing films from other decades. The films screened represented a broad mixture of filmmaking, including mainstream hits, offbeat cult classics, obscurities, feature films, documentaries and concert films. A few films received their world premiere at the festival. Other films received their US, West Coast, or Los Angeles premieres.

The festival attracted major celebrities to discuss films with which they have been associated, including: Roger Daltrey of the Who, Michelle Phillips of the Mamas & the Papas, Micky Dolenz of the Monkees, Spencer Davis, Howard Kaylan of the Turtles, Jack Casady of Jefferson Airplane, Andy Summers of the Police, Denny Laine of the Moody Blues, Peter Noone of Herman's Hermits, Nancy Sinatra, Rod McKuen, Barry McGuire, Olivia Newton-John, Lynn Redgrave, Michael York, Judy Geeson, Michael Lindsay-Hogg, Barbet Schroeder, Eleanor Bron, Michael Des Barres, Jerry Leiber and Mike Stoller.
