= Brett Hudson =

American musician and singer-songwriter (born 1953)

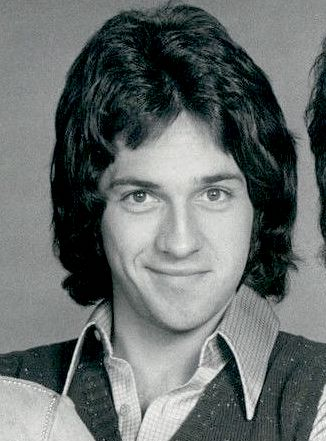
- Hudson in 1974
- Born: January 18, 1953 (age 73); Portland, Oregon, U.S.
- Occupations: Musician, singer, songwriter, producer, writer, actor
- Years active: 1965–present
- Spouse: Lavinia Lang (m. 1992)
- Relatives: Bill Hudson (brother); Mark Hudson (brother); Oliver Hudson (nephew); Kate Hudson (niece); Sarah Hudson (niece)

Brett Stuart Patrick Hudson (born January 18, 1953) is an American musician, singer-songwriter, writer, producer and actor. He was the youngest member of the musical group the Hudson Brothers, which was formed by his older brothers, Mark and Bill, in 1965. He is now a TV producer and writer.

== Early life ==
Hudson was born and raised in Portland, Oregon, the youngest of three boys (Mark and Bill are his two elder brothers) born to Eleanor (née Salerno) and William Louis Hudson. His mother was Italian American (his maternal grandfather came from Carlentini, Province of Syracuse, Sicily, Italy). He and his brothers were nephews of actor Keenan Wynn. Hudson's father walked out on the family when he was six, and Eleanor was forced to raise her boys alone, relying on welfare to raise them during their upbringing. He was raised Roman Catholic.

== Career ==
Hudson formed the production company Frozen Pictures with Burt Kearns. He has produced many television shows including All the Presidents' Movies with Martin Sheen for Bravo, The Secret History of Rock 'N' Roll for Court TV hosted by Gene Simmons of Kiss as well as Fox TV's A Current Affair. He also co-wrote and produced the Burt Reynolds movie Cloud 9. In 2012, Hudson co-produced Hansel & Gretel Get Baked released theatrically by Tribeca Film. He previewed his movie The Chris Montez Story with Chris Montez at The Fest for Beatles Fans convention held March 2010 in Secaucus, New Jersey.

He can be heard singing background on an odd assortment of CDs including Alice Cooper's 1994 The Last Temptation and Ringo Starr's 1999 I Wanna Be Santa Claus. He is also a trumpet player.

=== Honors and awards ===
Hudson received the 2009 Las Vegas Film Festival's Golden Ace Award in the Documentary Feature category for The Seventh Python.

== Personal life ==
Hudson married Lavinia Lang in 1992.

He was diagnosed with stage 4 throat cancer in 2007 and, after receiving many conventional as well as alternative cancer treatments, has been in remission since 2009. He is the uncle of singer/songwriter Sarah Hudson, actress Kate Hudson of Almost Famous and actor Oliver Hudson of Splitting Up Together.

== Filmography ==
=== Producing and directing ===
Year	Title	Notes
1988	Offshore Television	Television series; producer
2001	Adults Only: The Secret History of the Other Hollywood	Miniseries; director and producer
2001	The Secret History of Rock 'n' Roll with Gene Simmons	Television film; producer
2002	All the Presidents' Movies	Television documentary; director and producer
2003	My First Time	Television series; executive producer
2005	A Current Affair	Television series; producer
2006	Cloud 9	Producer
2007	Basketball Man	Documentary; producer
2008	The Seventh Python	Documentary; producer
2009	All the Presidents' Movies: The Movie	Documentary; producer
2011	What The	Television series; executive producer
2013	Hansel & Gretel Get Baked	Producer
2014	The Chris Montez Story	Documentary; producer

=== Acting ===
Year	Title	Role	Notes
1978	Zero to Sixty	Harry	
1978	The Millionaire	Harold Reardon	Television film
1979	Bonkers!	Himself	1 episode
1980	The Love Boat	Ed Corey	1 episode
1983	Hysterical	Fritz	
1994	Chantmania: The Benzedrine Monks of Santo Damonica	Ray Nosseris	
2006	Cloud 9	Blind man	Uncredited
