= Burt Kearns =

American film producer

- Education: Fairfield University
- Occupations: author; writer; film director; journalist; television and film producer

Burt Kearns is an American author, journalist, and television and film producer, writer and director, whom Donald Liebenson of Vanity Fair referred to as a "show business and pop culture savant."

Kearns is the author of five books: the television memoir Tabloid Baby (1999); The Show Won't Go On: The Most Shocking, Bizarre, and Historic Deaths of Performers Onstage, written with Jeff Abraham (2019); Lawrence Tierney: Hollywood's Real-Life Tough Guy (2022); Marlon Brando: Hollywood Rebel (2024); and Shemp! The Biography of the Three Stooges' Shemp Howard, The Face of Film Comedy (2024).

In 2018, he became a contributor to the literary pop culture website, PleaseKillMe.com. In December 2021, he began to contribute written and video pieces to Legs McNeil’s literary pop culture website, Legsville.com. Kearns began a Substack page in January 2026, featuring new nonfiction articles along with outtakes and excerpts from his books.

== Early career ==
After graduation from Fairfield University in 1978, Kearns worked as a reporter and editor for the Acorn Press, a chain of newspapers in southern Connecticut and Westchester, New York. In 1981, he moved to Manhattan, where he was hired on the assignment desk and later became a newswriter and show producer at WNEW-TV's 10 O'Clock News. Kearns also wrote for CBS News' Nightwatch and CBS Morning News. He joined WNBC-TV’s News 4 New York team in October 1983 as a newswriter and producer of the eleven o’clock newscast. While at NBC, he freelanced as a writer for Spin magazine.

Kearns joined the show A Current Affair in 1989. From 1990 to 1993, he worked on the rival show Hard Copy, as managing editor and producer. In 1994, he was senior producer of Premier Story. Kearns (and his coverage of the fall of the Berlin Wall) was included in Maury Povich's 1991 memoir, Current Affairs: A Life on the Edge.

Kearns left tabloid television and began writing Tabloid Baby in 1996. A combination memoir and exposé, the book was published in November 1999 by Hambleton-Hill's Celebrity Books imprint.

== Television and film production ==
=== Writer and producer ===
He was executive producer of, and appeared on-camera in the Reelz nonfiction special program, Kardashian: The Man Who Saved OJ Simpson. He was executive producer of the Reelz nonfiction special El Chapo & Sean Penn: Bungle In The Jungle. Kearns was also director, writer and executive producer of Hollywood Animal Crusaders for Animal Planet and co-producer of the HBO documentary Panic. He was producer of the Fox Television special, When Good Pets Go Bad 2, and executive producer and showrunner of series including the syndicated Strange Universe, TruTV’s Guinness World Record Unleashed and Conspiracy Theory with Jesse Ventura. He was a creator and executive producer of Breaking the Ice, a docuseries following the first diverse, competitive synchronized ice skating team. The series premiered on WE tv in 2023 and streams on AMC's ALLBLK platform. Kearns cowrote, produced and edited the 2025 nonfiction film, Pusherman: Frank Lucas and the True Story of American Gangster, directed by Legs McNeil.

=== Independent features and Good Story Productions ===
Kearns directed the nonfiction film, El Viaje Musical de Ezekiel Montanez: The Chris Montez Story, which opened on August 15, 2009 at the 35th annual The Fest For Beatles Fans in Chicago. Kearns produced the nonfiction film comedy High There. High There and the Montez film were produced through his Good Story Productions production company.

=== Frozen Pictures ===
In 2000, Kearns formed the production company Frozen Television (later Frozen Pictures) with producer Brett Hudson. Kearns was an executive producer on All the Presidents' Movies for Bravo and The Secret History of Rock ’n’ Roll with Gene Simmons and Adults Only: The Secret History of The Other Hollywood for Court TV.

With Hudson and Albert S. Ruddy, Kearns wrote and produced the 2006 Twentieth Century-Fox film, Cloud 9, starring Burt Reynolds, which was a joint production of Frozen and The Ruddy Morgan Organization.

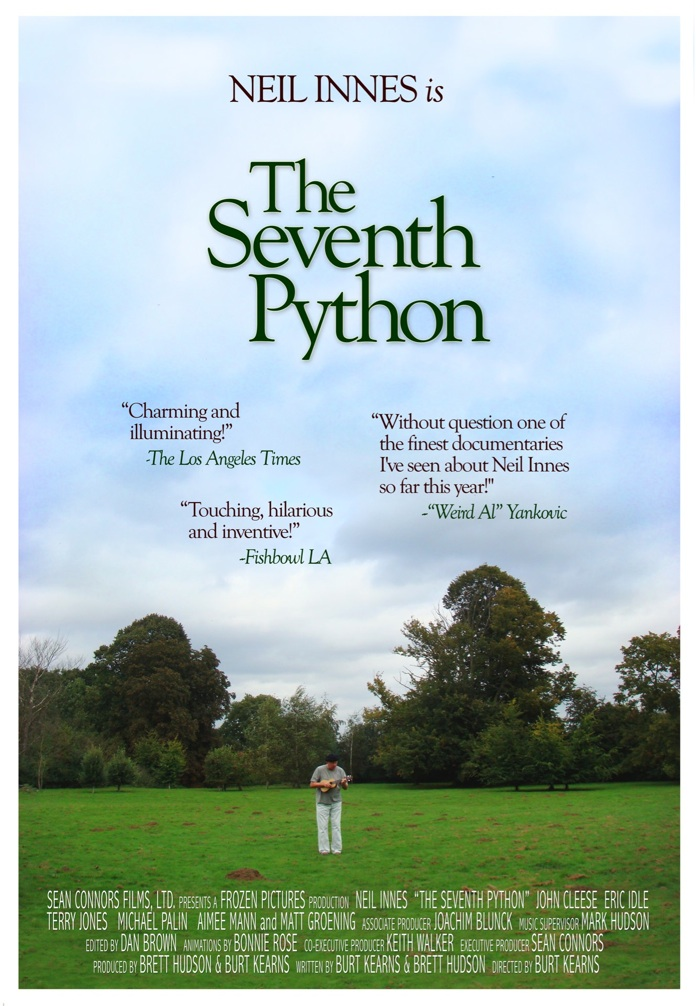

He directed and produced the 2008 documentary musical film, The Seventh Python, about the career and influence of Monty Python collaborator and Bonzo Dog Band member Neil Innes, and directed and produced Basketball Man, the Frozen Pictures documentary film that featured interviews telling the story of the game's inventor, James Naismith. The film was released on DVD on May 8, 2007.

Kearns founded the website, Saintmychal.com, that chronicled and promoted the canonization of 9/11 victim Mychal Judge.

== Awards ==
- Emmy-winning newswriter, honored by New York City chapter of the National Academy of Television Arts and Sciences for contributing to the winning of Outstanding News Broadcast Emmy by WNBC-TV's News 4 New York at 6PM.
