= Bill Hudson (singer) =

American musician and actor (born 1949)

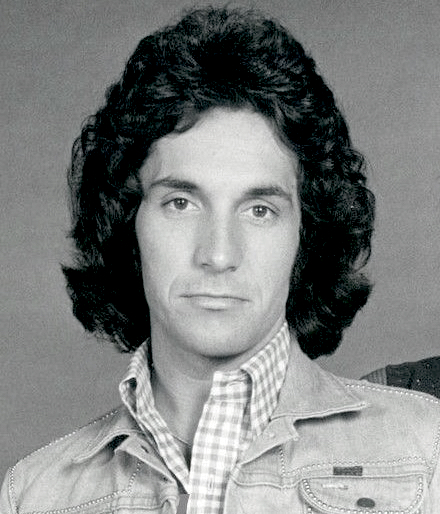
- Hudson in 1974
- Born: William Louis Hudson Jr. October 17, 1949 (age 76); Portland, Oregon, U.S.
- Occupations: Musician; actor
- Years active: 1965–2015
- Spouses: Goldie Hawn (m. 1976; div. 1982); Cindy Williams (m. 1982; div. 2000)
- Children: 5, including Oliver and Kate
- Relatives: Mark Hudson (brother); Brett Hudson (brother); Sarah Hudson (niece)

William Louis Hudson Jr. (born October 17, 1949) is an American musician and actor. He was a vocalist in the Hudson Brothers, a band he formed in 1965 with his two younger brothers, Brett and Mark. He later had a brief acting career, appearing in supporting roles in Zero to Sixty (1978), Hysterical (1983), and Big Shots (1987). He also had a recurring guest role on the series Doogie Howser, M.D. on ABC.

== Early life ==
Hudson was born and raised in Portland, Oregon, the eldest of three sons (Brett and Mark are his two younger brothers) born to Eleanor Salerno and William Louis Hudson. His mother was of Italian descent; his maternal grandfather came from Fagnano Castello, Cosenza, Calabria, Italy. He and his brothers were nephews (by marriage) of actor Keenan Wynn.

Bill Hudson's father left his family when Hudson was around six years old, saying he was going out for a pack of cigarettes. Bill's mother had to depend on welfare to support her children. He and his siblings grew up in his mother's Catholic faith.

== Career ==
Bill Hudson was the vocalist for The Hudson Brothers. As an actor, Hudson appeared in the film Big Shots (1987), and three episodes of the television series Doogie Howser, M.D. from 1989 to 1992.

Hudson published a memoir, Two Versions: The Other Side of Fame and Family, in December 2011.

== Personal life ==
During his bachelor days, Hudson had relationships with singer Karen Carpenter in addition to actresses Loretta Swit and Jill St. John. In 1975 he and Goldie Hawn dated; they married in 1976. Hudson filed for divorce in 1980 and it was finalized right before he remarried in 1982. They had two children, Oliver and Kate, who grew up with Hawn and Kurt Russell. When Oliver criticized his biological father in a public statement on Father's Day in 2015, Hudson spoke out for the first time to accuse Hawn of "willfully alienating" him from their children through the years.

Hudson next had a relationship with Ali MacGraw, which dissolved by mid-1981. His second marriage was in 1982 to Cindy Williams, with whom he had two children. They divorced in 2000. In 2006, Hudson fathered a daughter with his then-girlfriend Caroline Graham. In 2018, Hudson's son, Oliver, told Larry King that he and his father had begun speaking again after being estranged for many years.

Hudson campaigned for Democratic presidential candidate Michael Dukakis in 1988.

== Filmography ==
Year	Title	Role	Notes
1974–1975	Hudson Brothers Razzle Dazzle Show	himself	
1978	Zero to Sixty	Eddie	
1978	Kiss Meets the Phantom of the Park	Man in Kiss Booth	
1978	The Millionaire	Eddie Reardon	Television film
1980	The Love Boat	Dr. Louis DaCosta	1 episode
1983	Hysterical	Frederic Lansing / Casper	
1986	Walt Disney's Wonderful World of Color	Tom Burke	Episode: "Help Wanted: Kids"
1987	Big Shots	Mr. Dawkins	
1989	Just Like Family	Tom Burk	TV series, 5 episodes
1989–1992	Doogie Howser, M.D.	Michael Plenn	3 episodes

== Bibliography ==
- Hudson, Bill; Smitherman, Dave (2011). Two Versions: The Other Side of Fame and Family. Dailey Swan Publishing. ISBN 9780983809005.
