= Roger Christie =

American cannabis activist

The Reverend Roger Christie
- Born: June 15, 1949 (age 77); Steamboat Springs, Colorado, U.S.
- Education: Associate in Science in Career Pilot
- Alma mater: Miami-Dade Junior College
- Occupation: Minister
- Criminal charges: Marijuana possession and trafficking
- Website: www.thc-ministry.org

Roger Christie (born June 15, 1949) is an American ordained minister in the Religion of Jesus Church, which regards marijuana as a "sacramental herb." In 2000, he founded the THC Ministry, which offered cannabis as a part of its services. On July 8, 2010, Christie and 13 other individuals associated with the THC Ministry were indicted by a Federal grand jury in Honolulu on marijuana possession and trafficking charges. On Sept. 27, 2013, Christie pleaded guilty to marijuana trafficking and two counts of failing to file income tax returns. On April 28, 2014, Christie was sentenced to a term of five years in federal prison, with credit for time already served at the Honolulu Federal Detention Center.

== Biography ==
Roger Christie was born on June 15, 1949, in Steamboat Springs, Colorado. Raised and schooled in the New Jersey countryside in the 1950s and 1960s, he graduated from high school in 1967.

After two years of college studies and flight training school in Miami, Florida he received an associate's degree in Science and a Commercial Pilot certificate.

In 1970 he enlisted in the US Army and was trained as a G2 Intelligence Analyst at Fort Holabird, Maryland, a US Army "spy school", but became disenchanted by the military and political missions in Vietnam and elsewhere. Christie refused his orders to serve in the Vietnam War and received an honorable discharge as a conscientious objector. His success in this process inspired him to pursue legal options to overturn United States drug policy, a fight which has led him to numerous court battles and arrests.

In 1986, he became a resident of Big Island, Hawaii. He was a co-founder of the Hawai'i Hemp Council in 1990 and, with Aaron Anderson (Ernest Allan Anderson), and Dwight Kondo, founded the Hawaiian Hemp Company. By 1991, he had one of the first retail hemp stores in the world. In 1996, Christie ran unsuccessfully for a seat on the Hawaii County Council. In June, 2000, he was ordained as a minister by the Religion of Jesus Church through the Universal Life Church. He received his license to perform marriages in the State of Hawaii as a "Cannabis Sacrament" Minister and founded the THC Ministry. In 2004 he failed in an election bid for Mayor of Hawaii County.

=== THC Ministry ===
Roger Christie ran the THC Ministry (aka Hawaii Cannabis Ministry) in Hilo, Hawai'i for ten years. According to the Ministry's website, "We use Cannabis religiously and you can, too." Roger believes that spiritual and/or religious use of Cannabis hemp is worthy of First Amendment recognition and protections. He is on a life mission to achieve the goal of Equal Justice Under the Law for Cannabis sacrament for the THC Ministry and for We the people. Home brewing of beer and wine with no limit on alcohol content is legal for every household in all 50 states. Roger's goal includes the acceptance of home growing of safe and natural Cannabis in a similar way, using the concepts of Equal Justice Under Law, the First Amendment for religious freedom and the separation of church and state.

The THC Ministry's blessing is: "God, that's great! Please show me the blessings in this situation ... and hurry! I am safe, I am loved and all is well."

The THC Ministry's spiritual practices include: confession, forgiveness, gratitude and love. Example: "I apologize for my part in _________ . Please forgive me. Thank you. I love you." It's a karma cleaning technique to redeem oneself and to be able to move forward with greater integrity.

For a suggested donation, a person can become a "Practitioner" and receive a plaque designating their home and garden as a Sanctuary, a place of refuge for cultivating and using Cannabis in private as a sincere practice. The Sanctuary Kit for Practitioners also contains an "affidavit of religious use", two self-laminating ID cards, and seven "Sacramental Plant Tags". For $250, the donor would get a "Cannabis Sanctuary Kit" which also included the "THC Ministry Cannabis Religion Guide". According to Christie, in the past "We had Cannabis that people could donate for if they are 'blue card' (medical marijuana permit) holders or sincere members of the ministry."

According to the FBI, an estimated 90% of the customers were Ministry members, while the remaining 10% had state medical marijuana cards.

In order to join the Ministry, members in Hilo were asked to sit through a one-hour orientation session with Roger Christie. Roger Christie said he also scheduled membership sessions with passengers on visiting cruise ships who were in Hilo for one day, and one could also join by ordering a Ministry "sanctuary kit" by mail for a $250 "donation." The kit includes a Letter of Good Standing which can be used by Ministers in many states to get a license to marry people from their state government specifically as a "Cannabis sacrament" Minister. Roger is the first person known in U.S. history to have been ordained and then licensed by a state government as a Cannabis sacrament Minister. New members have to sign an affidavit stating that their use of Cannabis is for personal, private Sacramental use only. Once oriented and welcomed into the THC Ministry a new member has a built-in religious defense to arrest and prosecution for sincere, private, non-commercial use of Cannabis hemp for life. The goal is to have a stronger "affirmative defense" for all sincere members. "Reasonable doubt" is, in theory, all that's needed to succeed in a jury trial. Good manners, respect, sincerity and the legitimacy of membership in the THC Ministry provide that reasonable doubt.

The discovery of Cannabis hemp being the 'fragrant cane', Kaneh Bosom in Hebrew, in the Bible recipe of Exodus 30:23 for holy anointing oil was made by researcher and author Chris Bennett. Roger is credited with making and returning the holy anointing oil of Moses and the christening oil of Jesus to use in the THC Ministry. The words Messiah, Christ and Mahdi all translate to "anointed". Christian is "an anointed one". Jesus Christ translates to "I am anointed." Anti-Christ translates to "against anointing". Roger likes to say, "We believe anointing is a literal thing. Anoint your crown with holy oil and hear the angels sing!"

In 2009, the ministry was open three days a week from 2:00 to 5:00 p.m. During this three-hour period, there were up to 70 members served. The Christies and their staff welcomed people from all walks of life. Each member, patient or visitor was required to wash their hands with hemp soap upon entering and to have good manners and respect while visiting the offices in the Moses Building in Hilo.

Roger Christie provided ministry services and Cannabis sacraments to members and medical patients, alike. Services included counseling, fellowship, weddings, funerals and more. Cannabis sacraments included holy anointing oil (See Exodus 30:23, and Mark 6:13), Cannabis tinctures made with French cognacs, and a non-alcoholic tincture made with vegetable glycerine and Cannabis flowers. "There's a Bud in Every Bottle" is the motto. There were often "Aloha bags" of Cannabis trimmings given for free to those in need. "We liked to say "yes" to Cannabis culture people who were used to hearing "no" too often in life. "Our goal every day was to see everyone leave the ministry with a smile."

Rev. Roger Christie and the THC Ministry sued the U.S. government for declaratory relief and a permanent injunction in 2004 in order to get full legal recognition and protections from the federal government. He dismissed the case a few months later due to a conflict with his lawyer, Michael Glenn of Honolulu. Before the dismissal, however, the defendants U.S. government filed a 37-page Motion to Dismiss. Roger has both the original injunction and the government's 37 pages of legal "chess moves" to use to refile the case at an appropriate time. "God, that's great."

=== Investigation ===
In 2008, an undercover law enforcement officer was introduced to Roger Christie, and on three separate occasions at the ministry, Christie sold quantities of marijuana to him (the largest being one-half pound).

Thereafter, a court-authorized wiretap on three telephone lines used by Roger Christie from April to July 2009 resulted in the interception and recording of numerous telephone conversations involving Roger and Sherryanne Christie, ministry employees, and other persons. According to Christie, investigators monitored 17,000 phone calls during a two-year period.

On March 20, 2010, Federal agents raided the downtown Hilo sanctuary of Christie's Hawaii Cannabis Ministry, assisted by local police. Christie said authorities spent about seven hours searching his home and ministry, starting around 6 a.m. He said the Drug Enforcement Administration, Internal Revenue Service, U.S. Postal Inspector and U.S. Immigration and Naturalization Service were involved in the search.

A three-count sealed indictment in June, 2010 charged Christie with conspiracy to manufacture, distribute and possess with intent to distribute more than 100 marijuana plants, manufacturing marijuana and possession with the intent to distribute 240 marijuana plants.

=== Arrest and incarceration ===
Christie was arrested on Thursday July 8, 2010, along with 13 others from the Big Island, and charged with possession and sale of cannabis. According to court documents, authorities confiscated approximately 30 ounces (845 grams) of processed marijuana in the Wainaku apartment and more than $34,000 cash from the apartment and a bank safe deposit box. The money and the apartment face possible federal forfeiture. Christie's arrest culminated a two-year investigation by federal and county law enforcement during which they seized 2,296 marijuana plants, nine weapons, 33 pounds of processed marijuana, and four properties from Christie and his co-defendants. Federal authorities said this was a huge pot-growing and selling organization masquerading as a religious group. Agents seized about 3 thousand plants with a street value of nearly $5 million.

After his arrest, Christie was taken to Oahu and incarcerated at the Honolulu Federal Detention Center. All other detainees were speedily released on bail or signature bond before trial. But Hawaii Federal District Court Judge Alan Kay ruled that Christie must remain in federal custody until his trial.

The prosecution argued that Christie should not be released on bail because he is a danger to the community. The court accepted this argument because marijuana was found again in a new search of Christie's home in June 2010, leading the court to conclude that Christie would continue to violate the law while out on bail. As quoted in the Star-Advertiser on Feb. 24, Judge Alan Kay remarked: "You would think the light would come on when the first search of his residence was made." Judge Kay's ruling was upheld by the 9th US Circuit Court of Appeals.

On Jan. 17, 2013, a federal grand jury in Honolulu returned an updated indictment against Christie and seven co-defendants. The indictment includes additional charges for three sales of marijuana to an undercover officer during 2008 and two charges of his failure to file income tax returns for 2008 and 2009," Assistant U.S. Attorney Michael Kawahara, the lead prosecutor, said.

=== Political support ===
On March 21, 2013, The Hawaii Senate Committee on Public Safety, Intergovernmental and Military Affairs heard and passed Senate Concurrent Resolutions SCR75 and SR42, "urging the federal government to release Roger Christie pending trial."

On April 3, 2013, Roger Christie was visited by Senator Russell Ruderman and Senator Will Espero at the Federal Detention Center (FDC) in Honolulu. The purpose of this visit was to discuss Christie's incarceration, health, and rights as a United States citizen under the United States Constitution. The terms of this visit specified that no media be present. Christie was denied contact with reporters from National Geographic, Newsweek, Honolulu Civil Beat, and others Senator Ruderman stated, "I have known Roger for over 25 years. He is one of the most peaceful persons I know. To anyone who knows him, the claim that he is a danger to the community is absurd." Senator Espero commented. "This visit was very enlightening. I still feel that Christie should be released pending a trial."

On April 10, 2013, the Hawaii Senate Judiciary and Labor Committee heard concurrent resolutions SCR75 and SR42, "urging the federal government to release Roger Christie pending trial." Hundreds of testimonies supporting the measures were received from the public.

The committee also heard testimony from Tracy Ryan, the Vice Chair of the Hawaii Libertarian Party, who said that Roger Christie was the victim of a "frightening", "railroading system" in which federal prosecutors have provided "a lot of good lawyerly reasons... to... say that the constitution of the United States doesn't apply to the federal system."

During the proceedings, Senator Sam Slom and Senator Russell Ruderman both spoke in support of passing the resolutions onto the senate for a full hearing. Sen. Clayton Hee, the Chair of the Senate Judiciary Committee, acknowledged that there were "many testimonies in support" of the resolutions. Nevertheless, Senator Hee deferred the resolutions.

Another 2013 Hawaii Senate Resolution, SR12, called on President Obama to "initiate a formal investigation into the conduct of federal law enforcement personnel in regard to the violation of the constitutional rights of Hawaii County Resident, the Reverend Roger Christie." SR12 was never scheduled for a hearing.

=== Guilty plea ===
Christie faced up to 40 years in a federal penitentiary if convicted at trial. He was represented by a public defender. While Christie was awaiting trial, six co-defendants made plea deals with the prosecution to cooperate with authorities.

On September 27, 2013, Christie made a deal with prosecutors to plead guilty in federal court to conspiring to manufacture, distribute, and possess with intent to distribute 100 or more marijuana plants. His wife, Sherryanne Christie, pleaded guilty to a similar charge involving 50 plants or more. As part of a plea agreement, the Christies agreed to forfeit more than $21,000 in proceeds from the operation of the THC Cannabis Ministry, which operated in Hilo from 2000 until July 8, 2010, when they and 12 others were arrested. Roger Christie also agreed under duress to forfeit a condominium apartment on Kauila Street in Hilo which was a gift from his late Mother.

On April 28, 2014, U.S. District Judge Leslie Kobayashi sentenced Roger Christie to a term of five years in federal prison, with credit for the almost four years he had been incarcerated, permitting him to be released after serving 50 months in the Federal Detention Center Honolulu with no bail and no trial, no outside, no sunshine and no media contact allowed. In addition, he was sentenced to supervised release — the federal equivalent of probation — for four years after serving his prison term. The conditions of the supervised release include refraining from the use of marijuana or other controlled substances or from being in the presence of using marijuana. He was subject to drug testing and always tested negative. He was allowed to appeal his sentence but was denied by the Ninth Circuit Court of Appeals in San Francisco. His wife and co-defendant, Sherryanne "Share" Christie was sentenced to a term of 27-months. She was allowed to remain free on bail pending an appeal of her sentence which was denied.

The prosecution resulted from the combined efforts from 2008 to 2010 of the Drug Enforcement Administration; the Internal Revenue Service-Criminal Investigations; Homeland Security Investigations; the Federal Bureau of Investigation; the Bureau of Alcohol, Tobacco, Firearms, and Explosives; the U.S. Postal Inspection Service; the U.S. Marshals Service; the National Park Service; the Sheriff's Office, Department of Public Safety; the Hawaii Police Department; and the Honolulu Police Department. The case was prosecuted by Assistant U.S. Attorney Michael K. Kawahara.

During the proceedings, U.S. District Court Judge Leslie Kobayashi denied Roger's motion that "marihuana" was misclassified as a Schedule 1 most dangerous substance with "no recognized medical use in treatment in the U.S.A." despite medical Cannabis being legal in Hawai'i since June 2000 and in many other jurisdictions. A hopeful ruling did come when Judge Kobayashi ruled that Roger and his wife Share were "sincere" and "religious" Cannabis Ministers, but soon afterwards she denied their religious defense because she ruled that the U.S. government had a "compelling interest" in keeping Cannabis illegal, AND that the government used the "least restrictive means" to deny their religious freedom. Roger and Share's intention to have "the last marijuana trial" (See: www.the-last-marijuana-trial.com) was denied, and most of their evidence and witnesses were never seen or heard by the Judge or a jury.

On September 4, 2014, Roger Christie was transferred to the Mahoney Hale halfway house in Honolulu before being allowed to return to Puna on the Big Island on supervised release on November 14.

May 2020 Roger completed his four-year federal probation with no violations. He was denied early release of probation by U.S. District Court Judge Leslie Kobayashi.

On October 11, 2016 Share Christie self-surrendered to a federal prison camp in Phoenix, Arizona to serve a 27-month sentence with an added three year probation. She was transferred back to the Federal Detention Center Honolulu in April 2017 where she was held until released to the Orion Halfway House in Los Angeles on August 7, 2018. Share was allowed to live with her parents on September 21, 2018 where she chose to stay until coming home to Hilo on January 15, 2020. Her probation officially ends on September 21, 2021. She was denied early termination of her probation by Judge Kobayashi in January 2020. She recently filed another motion for early termination of probation, this time doing it pro se, without a lawyer. The U.S. government strongly opposed her early release, again. She's expecting an answer from the judge in June 2020.

Roger wrote a chapter in the book called Cannabis and Spirituality by Stephen Gray. He, his wife Share and others are featured in the book called God On High by Professor of Religion Laurie Cozad.

Roger is planning to restart the THC Ministry in June 2020 mostly online, but without the distribution of Cannabis sacrament until he "wins a federal injunction, or better". Ministry membership, Letters of Good Standing, Sanctuary Kits, hemp prayer shawls, I.D. cards and other THC Ministry gear will be available once again to sincere spiritual users of Cannabis.
