= Mark Hudson (musician) =

American songwriter and record producer (born 1951)

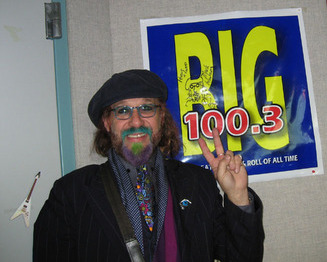
- Hudson in 2007
- Born: Mark Jeffery Anthony Hudson; August 23, 1951 (age 75); Portland, Oregon, U.S.
- Occupations: Musician, record producer, songwriter, actor
- Years active: 1965–present
- Spouse: Melissa Walter
- Children: Sarah Hudson
- Relatives: Bill Hudson (brother); Brett Hudson (brother); Kate Hudson (niece); Oliver Hudson (nephew)

Mark Jeffery Anthony Hudson (born August 23, 1951) is an American musician, record producer, actor and songwriter based in both Los Angeles and New York City. After first rising to prominence as a performer, songwriter and TV personality in the 1970s as a member of the Hudson Brothers trio, Hudson achieved independent success as record producer and songwriter, working with a broad variety of artists including Cher, Ringo Starr, Aerosmith, Scorpions, Ozzy Osbourne, Hanson, Harry Nilsson and the Baha Men.

== Music ==
=== With Aerosmith ===
Hudson co-wrote the Grammy award-winning Aerosmith hit "Livin' on the Edge" in 1993, and has since co-written a total of 12 Aerosmith songs. He co-produced their 2001 album Just Push Play, co-writing six of the album's twelve songs.

Hudson, along with Steven Tyler, Joe Perry, Paul Santo, and Marti Frederiksen, make up an informal collective of songwriters, musicians and producers known as the "Boneyard Boys", considered responsible for Aerosmith's creative process.

=== With Ringo Starr ===
For ten years starting in 1998, Hudson was the primary driving force as producer and composer behind Ringo Starr's continued career as a recording artist. In that endeavor, Hudson produced or co-produced nine albums for Starr. There were five studio albums: Vertical Man (1998), I Wanna Be Santa Claus (1999), Ringo Rama (2003), Choose Love (2005) and Liverpool 8 (2008). Three live albums were also released during this relationship: VH1 Storytellers (1998), Ringo Starr and Friends (2006) and Ringo Starr: Live at Soundstage (2007). The ninth album – a compilation album Ringo 5.1: The Surround Sound Collection – included remixes of thirteen tracks originally produced by Hudson and Starr. It was nominated for Best Surround Sound Album in the 51st annual Grammy Awards for the year 2007–2008.

The nine albums co-produced by Hudson featured a total of 82 different songs. 17 of the 82 songs were cover versions of various classics and oldies. The other 65 songs were specially composed new songs. Underscoring the primacy of his role in the creation of the albums, Hudson was credited as co-writer of 64 of the 65 new songs.

Hudson secured Steven Tyler as guest vocalist on a remake of Dobie Gray's song "Drift Away" for the album Vertical Man. Shortly prior to release, Tyler's record label demanded that his vocal be removed, and he was replaced by Tom Petty on the officially released album. However, the version of the recording featuring Tyler had been circulated on advance promotional discs and found its way on to bootlegs.

In 2003, Starr told the professional audio industry magazine Mix: "Mark puts the fun back in recording. We always have such a great time. He lets the musician know that anything is possible... He's a great musician, has lots of energy and he's a lot of fun to work with."

In June 2007, Starr's attorney, Bruce Grakal, told Beatlefan magazine (issue #141) that the partnership between Hudson and Starr was over, and that they would not work together again. Grakal claimed that the split occurred because Hudson had asked to withdraw from appearing in one of Starr's concert tours – allegedly on short notice. Hudson had been offered a major role on a network TV show The One: Making a Music Star which conflicted with the Starr tour. Hudson said in an interview with Beatlefan magazine that withdrawing from the 2006 All-Starr band tour was not the primary reason for the split and cited Starr's preference for using more synthesized sounds for his next album.

Prior to the split with Starr, Hudson had co-written and recorded all 12 songs heard on the final version of the Liverpool 8 album. After the split, Starr had the tracks remixed by Dave Stewart who was credited as "re-producer." The album was released in January 2008 on EMI/Capitol Records as part of Starr's new recording deal, having left Koch Records in late 2006.

In 2003, Hudson formed a jointly owned record company with Ringo Starr called Pumkinhead Records intended to release recordings by other artists. Distribution for the label was set up via EMI. The label released an album titled Fake Songs by Liam Lynch, the creator of MTV's sock-puppet show Sifl and Olly.

=== Producer of multi-star charity single of "Tears in Heaven" ===
In 2005, Hudson produced a new, multi-artist recording of Eric Clapton's 1991 song "Tears in Heaven" as a charity single for victims of the 2004 Indian Ocean earthquake and tsunami. Funds raised from the project, which was initiated by Sharon Osbourne, went to the Save the Children charity. Hudson recorded the song in the UK, US and in Europe. Among musicians that Hudson and Osbourne recruited for the recording were: Elton John, Rod Stewart, Steven Tyler, Ozzy Osbourne, Phil Collins, Ringo Starr, Gavin Rossdale, Paul Santo, Gwen Stefani, Mary J. Blige, Pink, Kelly Osbourne, Katie Melua, Josh Groban, Andrea Bocelli and members of Velvet Revolver: Slash, Duff McKagan, Matt Sorum, Dave Kushner and Scott Weiland. The recording also featured actor Robert Downey Jr.

=== Other work ===
In 1985, he co-starred with Geena Davis in the TV show Sara, playing her next-door neighbor Stuart Webber. Hudson also worked closely with Phil Ramone and sang background vocals on many albums/songs produced by Ramone, such as "Crazy for You" by Madonna.

In 1986, he was the in-house bandleader on Fox's short-lived The Late Show Starring Joan Rivers. Rivers referred to the band as, "Mark Hudson, The Party Boys and The Tramp."

In July 1994, he joined Disney's Hollywood Records as a songwriter and producer for performers such as Alice Cooper and Aerosmith. Disney brought him on board to sharpen production, and identify new acts.

In 2004, he was recruited by Sharon Osbourne to join her team as vocal coach for the UK TV show The X Factor. Nicknamed "Weird Beard" because of his colourful facial hair and flamboyant clothing, he coached all the under-25s in the first series and the over-25s in the second.

He also co-wrote 3 tracks on Bon Jovi's 2004 box set, 100,000,000 Bon Jovi Fans Can't Be Wrong.

On March 5, 2006, he achieved his first Number 1 in the UK Top 40 singles chart with an original song he had written for Chico Slimani, X Factor contestant. Called "Chico Time", it displaced Madonna from the top of the chart. It has sold over 100,000 copies in the UK.

The X Factor: Battle of the Stars was screened in the UK during the week of May 29, 2006. Hudson was recruited to reprise his coaching role, this time with celebrities who performed in a week long once-a-night version of the show, raising money for their chosen charity. The show was won by Lucy Benjamin, actress; runner up was Matt Stevens, England Rugby International. The British public voted for their favourites as Sharon Osbourne, Louis Walsh, and Simon Cowell sat in judgment.

At Hudson's request, Aerosmith's Steven Tyler made a guest appearance on Keith Anderson's July 2006 single called "Three Chord Country and American Rock & Roll", the title track from his debut album. The single was remixed by Hudson in Nashville, and Tyler's vocal added at Hudson's studio in Los Angeles.

In 2006, Hudson again assumed his coaching role on the 3rd series of The X Factor, this time coaching all the acts on a weekly basis.

In early 2007, Hudson was invited to participate for the third year running at Canadian Music Week (CMW). The CMW is the most prestigious event on Canada's music industry calendar, showcasing over 500 bands across 40 venues and inviting industry experts to share their knowledge at seminars. Hudson's seminar panel included fellow songwriting associates, Nile Rodgers, Glen Ballard, and Don Was. He also took the stage for an evening performance "in-the-round" at the CMW Songwriter's Festival 2007.

For the week of July 19, 2007, Hudson was the stand-in DJ on WBIG-FM, a Washington, D.C.–based radio station.

On October 28, 2007, Hudson made his professional solo stage debut in a sold-out, one-man show called "Livin' on the Edge" at Puck, Doylestown, PA. During the show, Hudson conveyed his experiences with rock music's elite using humorous anecdotes, impersonations, and music.

In 2007, he participated as a counselor at both the New York and Las Vegas 10th Anniversary Rock 'n Roll Fantasy Camp, and, in 2008, at the Los Angeles camp. The camps are an opportunity for non-professional music enthusiasts to perform with professional musicians.

Hudson is currently selling prints of his original artwork as well as a range of other merchandise.

Hudson has been working with AJ McLean, a member of boy-band the Backstreet Boys, on AJ's first solo album. Hudson has also written songs with JC Chasez of 'N Sync.

On April 13, 2008, Hudson was asked to perform for US President Bill Clinton at a fundraising rally supporting Hillary Clinton's nomination campaign. The performance took place at Puck, Doylestown, Pennsylvania.

In March 2009, he presented a soft launch of his first solo album, titled The Artist, at The Fest For Beatles Fans convention in New Jersey, where he also previewed music videos for the songs "Happy" and "All The Tea in China", the latter of which also featured his brother Brett Hudson.
