= Jim Steranko bibliography =

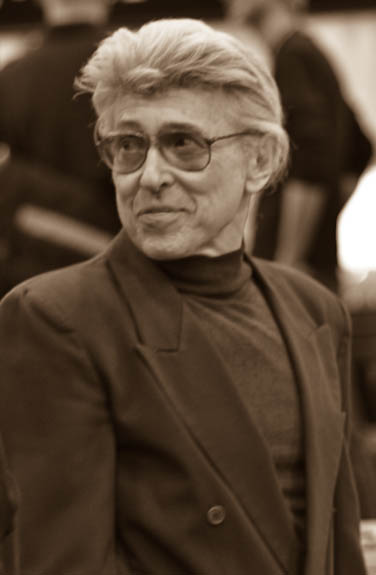
- Steranko at New York Comic Con February 2009

Publishers
- Marvel Comics: 1966–1974

This is a list of works by Jim Steranko.

== Comics ==
=== Interior work ===
==== DC ====
- Catwoman: Selina's Big Score #1, pinup (2002)
- Superman #400, story "The Exile at the End of Eternity" (10pp.) (Oct. 1984)
- Superman Gallery, one-shot, pinup (1993)

==== Marvel ====
- Captain America #110–111, 113, plus covers (Feb.-March, May 1969)
- Nick Fury: Agent of S.H.I.E.L.D. #1–3, 5, plus covers; covers only: #4, 6–7 (Jun–Dec. 1968)
- Our Love Story #5, story "My Heart Broke in Hollywood" (7pp.) (Feb. 1970)
- Strange Tales #151–153 (over Jack Kirby layouts), #154–168; odd-number covers from #151 (inker only), #153–167 (Dec. 1966 – May 1968)
- Tower of Shadows #1, story "At the Stroke of Midnight" (7pp.) (Sept. 1969)
- X-Men #50–51, plus covers; cover only: #49 (1968)
- FOOM, cover only, #2 (Summer 1973) (also incidental art, #1–4, Feb. 1973 – Winter 1974)

==== Other publishers ====
- Dark Horse Presents, vol. 2, #3 (Chapter 1 (13 pages) of Chandler: Red Tide re-drawn and re-written from original 1976 edition and also variant cover, 2011)
- Double-Dare Adventures #1 (Dec. 1966; Harvey Comics) (wrote and partly penciled story "Legend of the Glowing Gladiator", possibly penciled intro page, possibly wrote story "The Secret of Magicmaster")
- Heavy Metal, vol. 5, #3–7, 10 (HM Communications; June–Oct. 1981, Jan. 1982) – Serialized Outland movie adaptation
- Spyman #1–2 (Sep–Dec. 1966; Harvey Comics)
- The Illustrated Harlan Ellison 3-D story "'Repent, Harlequin!' Said the Ticktockman" (10pp.) (Baronet Publishing; Dec. 1978)

==== Collected works ====
- Nick Fury, Agent of S.H.I.E.L.D. (collects Strange Tales #150–168, 248 pages, Marvel Enterprises, 2000; ISBN 0-7851-0747-9)
- Nick Fury, Agent of S.H.I.E.L.D.: Who Is Scorpio? (collects Nick Fury, Agent of S.H.I.E.L.D. #1–3, 5, 96 pages, Marvel Enterprises, 2001; ISBN 0-7851-0766-5)
- Marvel Visionaries: Jim Steranko (Collects material from Captain America (1968) #110–113, Uncanny X-Men #49–51, Tower of Shadows (1969) #1, Our Love Story (1969) #5, Incredible Hulk Annual #1, Supernatural Thrillers (1973) #1–2, Fantastic Four (1961) #130–131, Creatures on the Loose (1971) #21–22, Nick Fury, Agent of SHIELD (1968) #1–2, Tex Dawson, Gun-Slinger (1973) #1, Nick Fury, Agent of SHIELD (1983) #1, and Western Gunfighters (1970) #14, Marvel Enterprises, 128 pages, 2002; ISBN 0-7851-0944-7)
- Marvel Masterworks: Nick Fury, Agent of S.H.I.E.L.D. Vol. 1 (Collects STRANGE TALES #135–153, TALES OF SUSPENSE #78 and FANTASTIC FOUR #21, Marvel Enterprises, 2009; ISBN 978-0785126867)
- Marvel Masterworks: Nick Fury, Agent of S.H.I.E.L.D. Vol. 2 (Collects STRANGE TALES #154–168 and NICK FURY, AGENT OF SHIELD #1–3., Marvel Enterprises, 2009; ISBN 978-0785135036)
- Marvel Masterworks: Nick Fury, Agent of S.H.I.E.L.D. Vol. 3 (collects STRANGE TALES #135–153, TALES OF SUSPENSE #78 and FANTASTIC FOUR #21, Marvel Enterprises, 2009; ISBN 978-0785150343)
- S.H.I.E.L.D. By Steranko: The Complete Collection (collects Strange Tales (1951) #151–168, Nick Fury, Agent of S.H.I.E.L.D. (1968) #1–3 & 5, 352 pages, Marvel Enterprises, 2013; ASIN B00PSN1N7S)
- Steranko is Revolutionary! collects Nick Fury stories from Strange Tales #151–168, 336 pages, September 2020, ISBN 978-1302922894

=== Comics covers work ===
- Action Comics #1000, (DC, variant, 2018)
- Airboy #51 (It's Alive, 2019)
- Batman Black and White vol. 2 #2 (DC, 2013)
- Before Watchmen: Rorschach #1, (DC, variant, 2012)
- Black Panther, vol. 6, #5D (Oct. 2016)
- Civil War II #7 (variant, Marvel, Nov 2016)
- Creatures on the Loose #21–22 (Jan.-March 1973)
- Daredevil #44 (inks only, Marvel, September 1968)
- Detective Comics #1000, (DC, variant, 2019)
- Doc Savage #2–3 (December 1972 – February 1973)
- Eerie #25 (Warren Publishing, Jan. 1970)
- Epic Illustrated #19 (Marvel, August 1983)
- Fantastic Four #130–132 (Marvel, January–March 1973)
- The Fly #1–2 (Archie Comics, May–July 1983)
- The Green Hornet #1 (Now Comics, Nov. 1989)
- The Incredible Hulk King-Size Special #1 (Oct. 1968) (Hulk head redrawn by Marie Severin)
- Hercules – The Thracian Wars #1, 2 versions – one fully painted and one pencils only (Radical Comics; May 2008)
- Hercules – The Thracian Wars #2, pencils only variant (Radical Comics; 2008)
- Hercules – The Knives of Kush #1, fully painted (Radical Comics; 2009)
- Kabuki #1 (Image Comics, 1997)
- Nick Fury Agent of S.H.I.E.L.D., Special Edition #1 (Marvel, 1983)
- Nick Fury vs. S.H.I.E.L.D. #1 (Marvel, June 1988)
- Nick Fury and His Agents of S.H.I.E.L.D. #1–2 (Marvel, February and April 1973)
- Marvel Comics Super Special #22 (Blade Runner, Marvel, September 1982)
- Phazer #1, (RGZ, Cover A, 2012)
- Ray Bradbury Comics: Martian Chronicles #1 (Topps Comics/Byron Preiss Visual Publications, June 1994)
- Shanna the She-Devil #1–2 (Marvel, December 1972 – February 1973)
- Supernatural Thrillers #1–2 (December 1972 – February 1973)
- Turf #1, (Image Comics, 2010)
- The Victorian #1 (Penny-Farthing Press; March 1999)
- Tex Dawson, Gunslinger #1 (Jan. 1973)
- Western Gunfighters #14 (March 1973)
- X-Men #49-51, (Marvel, October–December 1968)

== Books ==
- Steranko on Cards (Ireland Magic Company, 1960)
- Kort is now in Session (1962 – Designed and Illustrated only)
- The Steranko History of Comics 1 (Supergraphics, 1970, ISBN 0-517-50188-0; also wraparound cover)
- The Steranko History of Comics 2 (Supergraphics, 1972; also wraparound cover)
- Chandler: Red Tide Fiction Illustrated (Byron Preiss Visual Publications/Pyramid Books, 1976)
- Unseen Shadows: 50 Cover Concept Illustrations (Supergraphics, 1978)
- Domino Lady: The Complete Collection (Vanguard Productions 2004, ISBN 1-887591-70-2)

=== Book covers ===
- Prisoners of the Sky by C. C. MacApp (pseudonym of Carroll M. Capps) (1969; science fiction)
- The Mighty Barbarians: Great Sword and Sorcery Heroes, Hans Stefan Santesson, ed. (1969)
- Ice World (1969; science fiction)
- Return to the Stars (1969; science fiction)
- Why Isn't a Nice Girl Like You Married? or How to Get Most Out of Life While You're Single by Rebecca Greer (1970; self-help)
- Master Of The Dark Gate by John Jakes (1970) ISBN 1-199-15459-8
- Kelwin by Neal Barrett, Jr.(1970)
- Fletcher by Jack Bickham (1970) (Western)
- Wildcat O'Shea: A Stranger Named O'Shea (1970) by Jeff Clinton (Western)
- Infinity One by Robert Hoskins (1970; science fiction)
- Lord of Blood by Dave Van Arnam (1970; sword-and-sorcery)
- The Mighty Swordsmen, Hans Stefan Santesson, ed. (1970)
- G-8 and His Battle Aces #1: The Bat Staffel by Robert J. Hogan (1970; World War I)
- G-8 and His Battle Aces: Ace of the White Death by Robert J. Hogan (1970)
- G-8 and His Battle Aces: Purple Aces by Robert J. Hogan (1970)
- Warlocks and Warrior, L. Spague de Camp, ed. (1971; sword-and-sorcery)
- Wildcat O'Shea: Bounty on Wildcat (1971) by Jeff Clinton (Western)
- Wildcat O'Shea: Wildcat's Claim To Fame (1971) by Jeff Clinton
- Wildcat O'Shea: Wildcat's Revenge (1971) by Jeff Clinton
- The Shores Of Tomorrow by David Mason (1971; science fiction)
- Infinity Two by Robert Hoskins (1971; science fiction)
- The Masters of the Pit a.k.a. Barbarians of Mars by Michael Moorcock (1971; science fiction)
- Infinity Three by Robert Hoskins (1972; science fiction)
- The Further Adventures of Erik John Stark: The Ginger Star by Leigh Brackett (1974; sword-and-sorcery) ISBN 0-345-31827-7
- The Further Adventures of Erik John Stark 2: The Hounds Of Skaith by Leigh Brackett (1974) ISBN 0-345-24230-0
- The Further Adventures of Erik John Stark 3: The Reavers of Skaith by Leigh Brackett (1976) ISBN 0-345-24438-9
- Police Your Planet by Lester Del Rey with Erik van Lhin (1975; science fiction) ISBN 0-345-24465-6
- Weird Heroes Volume 1 (1975; pulp-inspired anthology) ISBN 0-515-03746-X
- Weird Heroes Volume 2 (1975; pulp-inspired anthology)
- The Unknown (1978; reprints of pulp magazine stories – anthology)
- Norgil the Magician by Maxwell Grant (pseudonym of Walter Gibson) (1977 reprints of pulp magazine stories) ISBN 0-89296-006-X
- Norgil: More Tales of Prestigitection by Maxwell Grant (1979 reprints of pulp magazine stories) ISBN 0-89296-042-6
- Tomorrow I Die by Mickey Spillane (1984) ISBN 0-89296-061-2
- Blade of the Guillotine (1986)
- Death Mask of Pancho Villa (1987)
- The Adventure House Guide to the Pulps by Doug Ellis, John Locke, and John Gunnison (2000) ISBN 1886937451
- Wild Cards XVI: Deuces Down, ed. by George R.R. Martin and Melinda Snodgrass (2002)
- Swords and Deviltry 1 : Fafrd and the Gray Mouser (2003)
- Swords against Death 2 : Fafrd and the Gray Mouser (2003)
- Swords in the Mist/Swords against Wizardry 3/4 : Fafrd and the Gray Mouser (2004)
- Meth o d, by Clifford Meth (2006)
- Conspiracy of the Planet of the Apes (2011)

==== Pyramid Books ====
The Shadow (reprints of pulp-magazine stories)
By Maxwell Grant (pseudonym of Walter Gibson)

- The Shadow #1: The Living Shadow (1974) ISBN 0-515-03597-1
- The Shadow #2: The Black Master (1974) ISBN 0-515-03478-9
- The Shadow #4: Hands in the Dark (1974)
- The Shadow #5: Double Z (1975)
- The Shadow #6: The Crime Cult (1975) ISBN 0-515-03699-4
- The Shadow #9: The Romanoff Jewels (1975) ISBN 0-515-03877-6
- The Shadow #10: The Silent Seven (1975) ISBN 0-515-03966-7
- The Shadow #11: Kings of Crime (1976)
- The Shadow #12: Shadowed Millions (1976) ISBN 0-515-03968-3
- The Shadow #13: Green Eyes (1977) ISBN 0-515-04205-6
- The Shadow #14: The Creeping Death (1977) ISBN 0-515-04206-4
- The Shadow #16: The Shadow's Shadow (1977) ISBN 0-515-04278-1
- The Shadow #17: Fingers Of Death (1977) ISBN 0-515-04279-X
- The Shadow #18: Murder Trail (1977) ISBN 0-515-04280-3
- The Shadow #19: Zemba (1977) ISBN 0-515-04285-4
- The Shadow #20: Charg, Monster ISBN 0-515-04284-6
- The Shadow #21: The Wealth Seeker (1978) ISBN 0-515-04283-8
- The Shadow #22: The Silent Death (1978)
- The Shadow #23: The Death Giver (1978)
- The Shadow #1: The Living Shadow (1978) (Different from 1974 edition)
- The Shadow #9: The Romanoff Jewels (1978) (Different from 1975 edition)
- The Shadow #11: Kings of Crime (1978) (Different from 1976 edition)
- The Shadow #12: Shadowed Millions (1978) (Different from 1976 edition)

==== Other ====
- The Revenge of the Hound: The New Sherlock Holmes Novel by Michael Hardwick (1987; mystery) ISBN 0-394-55653-4
- The Return of Valkyrie: An Airboy Graphic Album edited by Timothy Truman (1989) ISBN 0-913035-60-2
- Palladium Books Presents: Mystic China by Erick Wujcik (1995) ISBN 0-916211-77-0
- The Little Sister by Raymond Chandler (1997)
- Heroes Unlimited: Second Edition (1998)
- Captain America: Liberty's Torch (1998)
- The Bride Wore Black (2001)
- Phantom Lady (2001)
- Rear Window (2001)
- Night and the City (2001)
- Visual Storytelling: The Art and Technique by Tony C. Caputo; introduction by Harlan Ellison (2003) ISBN 0-8230-0317-5
- Compliments of the Domino Lady by Lars Anderson (2004 reprints of pulp-magazine stories) ISBN 0-9712246-6-8
- The Edge (2004)
- Domino Lady: The Complete Collection by Lars Anderson (2004) ISBN 1-887591-69-9
- Domino Lady: The Complete Collection Deluxe by Lars Anderson (2004; signed limited edition) ISBN 1-887591-70-2
- Drifter's Detour, by Bill Pearson (2006)
- The Spider: Robot Titans of Gotham, by Norvell W. Page (2007)
- The Spider: City of Doom, by Norvell W. Page (2008)
- Comixscene/Mediascene/Prevue, #1–92 (1972–1994) Magazine published by Supergraphics -Steranko was publisher, designer, editor and also contributed as writer and artist.
- Star Wars Art: Comics, double page illustration (2011)

== Biographical books ==
Books about Steranko includes:

- Steranko: Graphic Narrative by Philip Fry & Ted Poulos; introduction and illustrations by Jim Steranko (Winnipeg Art Gallery exhibit publication, 1978)
- Steranko: Graphic Prince of Darkness by Jim Steranko, J. David Spurlock, Peter DePree (Vanguard Productions, 1997).
- Steranko Arte Noir by Jim Steranko, J. David Spurlock, Angel de la Calle (Vanguard Productions/Semana Negra, 2002)
- Visual Theory: The Steranko Archives, Volume 1 (2003)
- Visual Storytelling: The Art and Technique (2003)
- Tout N’est Qu’Illusion…Jim Steranko by Guillaume Laborie (155 pages, printed in French, 2009)
