= Bee-Man =

Harvey Comics superhero

- Double-Dare Adventures #1 (Dec. 1966), cover art by Joe Simon and Jack Sparling.

Publication information
- Publisher: Harvey Comics
- First appearance: Double-Dare Adventures #1 (Dec. 1966)
- Created by: Joe Simon; Otto Binder; Bill Draut

In-story information
- Alter ego: Barry E. Eames
- Team affiliations: F-Bee-I
- Notable aliases: The Bee; B-Man
- Abilities: Super strength; increased intelligence; healing factor; flight; sonic buzz-blast; FBI training in karate and marksmanship; various bee-themed weapons

Bee-Man is a supervillain turned superhero in comic books published by Harvey Comics, who briefly appeared during the Silver Age of Comic Books. He was created by artist/writer/editor Joe Simon, writer Otto Binder, and artist Bill Draut.

== Publication history ==
Bee-Man appeared during a mid-1960s superhero fad that accompanied the rising popularity of Marvel Comics and the success of the campy television series Batman. When Harvey Comics, which specialized in such children's characters as Richie Rich, Little Dot and Casper the Friendly Ghost, entered the superhero field in 1966, it hired veteran comic-book artist, writer and editor Joe Simon to create the imprint Harvey Thriller. This line included the titles Double-Dare Adventures, Thrill-O-Rama and Unearthly Spectaculars and such superheroes and supervillains as Bee-Man, Spyman, Jigsaw, Magicmaster, Glowing Gladiator, Tiger Boy, and Jack Q Frost.

Bee-Man, by Joe Simon and writer Otto Binder and artist Bill Draut, debuted as the cover feature of Double-Dare Adventures #1 (Dec. 1966). His sole stories were the seven-page "The Origin of Bee-Man" in issue #1 and the 12-page "The Revolt of the Queen Bee", illustrated by Dick Ayers, in issue #2 (March 1967), on which he was also the cover feature. Shortly afterward, the Harvey Thriller imprint ended.

Despite his truncated career, the character - who in the origin story itself is referred to not as Bee-Man but as the Bee and in the second issue as B-Man - developed a small cult following amid fans of obscure 1960s Silver Age superheroes.

== Fictional character biography ==
NASA technician Barry E. Eames, feeling unappreciated because he was not picked to be an astronaut, sabotaged a space probe returning from Mars, hoping to capitalize on whatever valuable commodity it might contain. After reprogramming it to land in an isolated desert ravine, he looked inside and found it contained a large meteorite, which suddenly split open and released an angry swarm of giant alien bees.

Stung over a thousand times, Eames was discovered days later wandering through the desert in a state of delirium and was taken to a hospital. The doctors who examined him discovered that the alien venom had changed his body chemistry completely, causing his heart to beat three times faster than normal and giving him superhuman strength and intelligence and the ability to heal rapidly.

Escaping while still in a daze, Eames answered a strange mental summons and returned to the meteorite, where he was teleported to the Martian moon Deimos.

There, he met antenna-headed humanoid aliens known as the "Bee People", who explained that the NASA probe had accidentally intercepted a shipment of their Martian mutant Worker Bees, which did all the physical labor in their satellite kingdom. The huge honeybees had merely reacted instinctively when they discovered the probe had been sent to the wrong destination, and their stings had given Eames strange apian powers like their own.

The aliens told Eames that they themselves had no interest in Earth, claiming that humans would not understand them with their vastly superior intellect. However, they secretly plotted to conquer Earth, as they felt insects should rule the universe and enslave all other lifeforms.

Feeling like a freak on Earth and appreciated on Deimos, Eames adapted to the Bee People's way of life and became one of them, receiving a purple and gold suit of winged, jet-propelled body armor that allowed him to fly at supersonic speed and a helmet that fired sonic "buzz-blasts" from its metal antennas. He was also given bee bombs, pollen grenades, fast-drying liquid beeswax spray, and other bee-themed weapons.

Deciding to both feed his greed and get revenge on the world that he felt had rejected him, Eames returned to Earth and went on a crime spree, stealing gold for his "honey pot" and creating his secret mountaintop "Bee Hive" hideout to store it in.

However, summoned back to Deimos by the Bee People's eternally young and beautiful Queen Bea, he discovered that they had captured FBI agent Roy Dunn and planned to use their bee venom to create another Bee-Man. This second one would be completely under their mental control, and Eames finally clued into their sinister scheme to enslave humans and turn them into their new Worker Bees.

Horrified by the idea, Eames realized that while he might be a thief, he was not a traitor. He helped Dunn escape, and Dunn talked him into using his powers for good rather than his own selfish ends.

After Eames returned everything he stole as a sign of good faith, government scientists helped cure him of the psychological condition that caused him to turn against humanity, but he needed to regularly consume special concentrated honey capsules in order to maintain his newly acquired mental stability, lest he return to his evil ways.

After intensive training, Eames became a government agent and went to work for a newly created division of the FBI called the "F-Bee-I" ("Federal Bee Investigations") which had been set up to deal with the threat from space.
