= Shock Gibson =

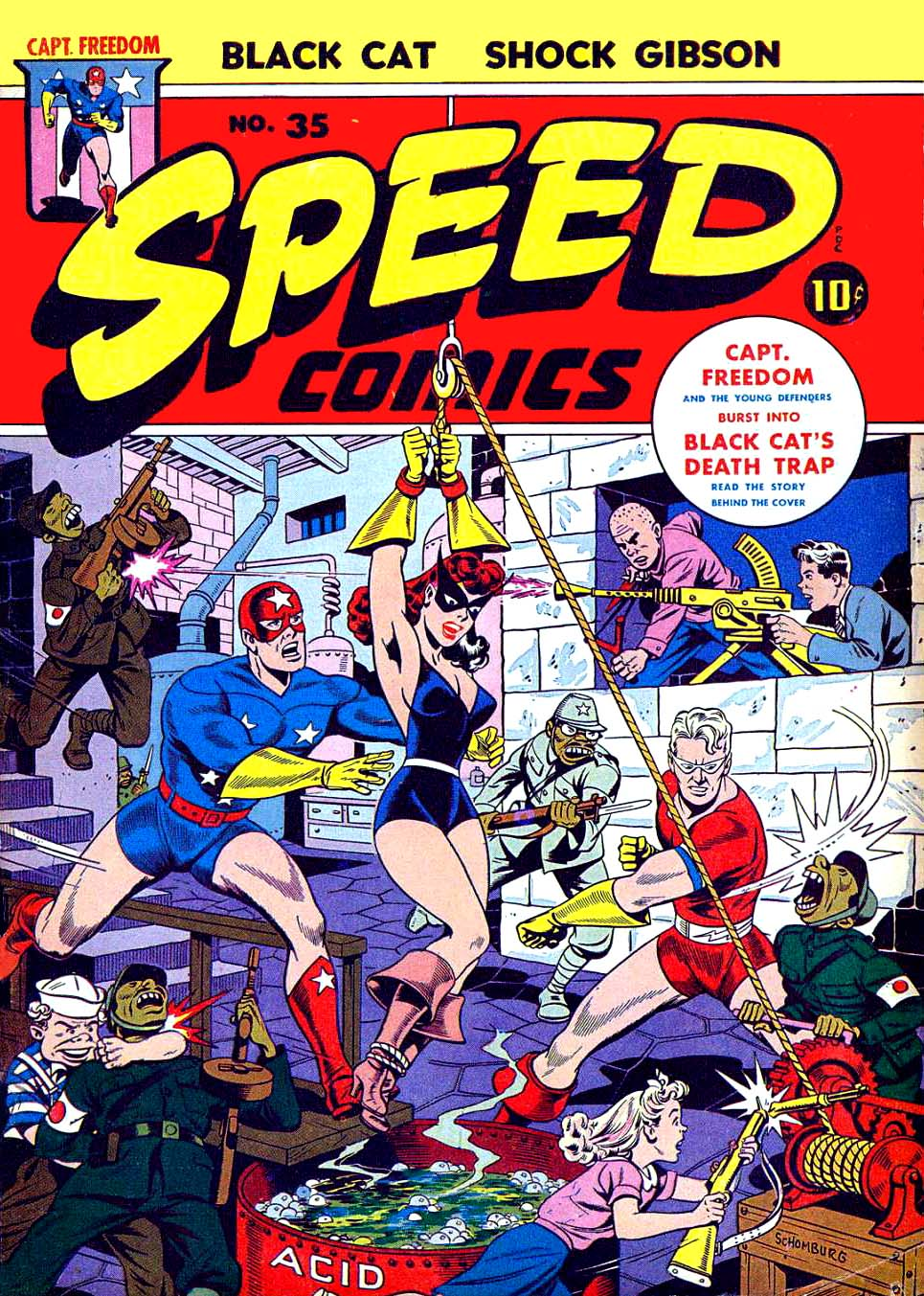
- Shock Gibson with Black Cat and Captain Freedom, Speed Comics #35, November 1944, artwork by Alex Schomburg.

Publication information
- Publisher: Brookwood Publications
- First appearance: Speed Comics #1 (Oct. 1939)
- Created by: Maurice Scott (artist)

In-story information
- Alter ego: Robert Charles Gibson
- Species: Human
- Partnerships: Black Cat, Captain Freedom, Tedd Parish, and the Girl Commandos
- Abilities: Superhuman strength; Fire bolts of lightning; Flight

Shock Gibson is a comic book superhero who first appeared in Speed Comics #1 (Oct. 1939), from Brookwood Publications (a company later absorbed by Harvey Comics). He was created by artist Maurice Scott, who drew it through issue #11, and an unknown writer. His 1939 introduction makes him one of comic books' earliest superheroes. He also appeared in All-New Comics #8.

In the debut story, "The Human Dynamo", scientist Robert Charles Gibson perfects a chemical formula that allows people to directly store, generate, and control electricity, and tests this formula on himself. The formula increases his strength, gives him the power to fire bolts of lightning, and grants him the power of flight.

According to Jess Nevins' Encyclopedia of Golden Age Superheroes, "Shock Gibson fights Baron von Kampf, mad scientist and zombie-maker; the Hobo Saboteurs; the Slave Traders of the Secret Kingdom; the Russian mad scientist Baron Ratski, who briefly teams up with Baron von Kampf; invading aliens from Mercury; and carnivorous dinosaurs".

In 1941, he transitioned from Brookwood to his new home at Harvey Comics, moving to Harvey's Champ Comics title and getting a new costume.

He is one of the several superhero characters to join the U.S. Army in the wake of World War II, fighting the Japanese military forces both in and out of costume. Shock Gibson teams up with other Harvey Comics characters such as the Black Cat, Captain Freedom, Tedd Parish, and the Girl Commandos (mostly in two-page text stories). The character remained in print in various Harvey publications through 1948.

Other artists associated with the character includes Al Avison, Arthur Cazeneuve, and the possibly pseudonymous Peter Jay, who introduced a new costume in Speed Comics #12 (March 1941).

Shock Gibson is among the public domain characters Image Comics revived in anthology title The Next Issue Project in 2007.
