= 3-D Man =

Marvel Comics fictional characters

- 3-D Man on the cover of Marvel Premiere #35, art by Jack Kirby and John Verpoorten

Publication information
- Publisher: Marvel Comics
- First appearance: Marvel Premiere #35 (April 1977)
- Created by: Roy Thomas (writer); Jim Craig (artist)

In-story information
- Alter ego: Charles "Chuck" Chandler; Harold "Hal" Chandler
- Species: Human mutate
- Abilities: Charles Chandler: Superhuman strength, speed, durability, agility, reflexes, and senses; Ability to see Skrulls in their original form; Talented football player; Accomplished pilot; Skilled hand-to-hand combatant; Harold Chandler: Superhuman strength, speed, durability, agility, reflexes, and senses; Ability to see Skrulls in their original form; Skilled hand-to-hand combatant; Experienced scientific researcher

3-D Man is the name of two superheroes appearing in American comic books published by Marvel Comics.

The first incarnation, a composite of two brothers, Charles Chandler and Hal Chandler, first appeared in Marvel Premiere #35 (April 1977). The second incarnation, Delroy Garrett, took on the name in Avengers: The Initiative #14, having debuted as Triathlon a decade before in Avengers (vol. 3) #8 (September 1998).

== Creation ==
In a text piece in Marvel Premiere #36, writer Roy Thomas described 3-D Man as an homage to the Joe Simon and Jack Kirby character Captain 3-D, and was intended by Thomas as a commentary on contemporary societal themes using 1950s analogues. Thomas was a noted user of retroactive continuity in his work for Marvel, notably on the World War II-set series The Invaders. Part of the inspiration was due to a relative dearth of Marvel Universe characters between the mid-1950s cancellation of most of Atlas Comics' superhero titles and the beginning of the company's Silver Age in Fantastic Four #1.

There are conflicting accounts as to how the character received his name; according to the character's artist co-creator Jim Craig, Thomas had initially told him 3-D Man was going to debut in his own magazine-format series in actual stereoscopic 3D, but after further researching the cost informed him that the budget would not cover it. However, other sources suggest the name was planned for a mooted back-up feature in a planned Spider-Man 3-D title in 1965 and that Thomas created a character based around the name. Thomas himself would recall "I wanted to do a comic set in the late 1950s, so I made up 3-D Man, even though 3-D was really a phenomenon of 1953 to 1955 or so at the latest. I gave him a costume based on the original Daredevil of Lev Gleason comics, only colored red and green instead of red and blue, and with a chest symbol. Young Canadian artist Jim Craig drew, which makes him co-creator. I named him Chuck Chandler, which was the real name of another Lev Gleason character, Crimebuster... and I borrowed and altered a couple of elements of Joe Simon and Jack Kirby's one-issue CAPTAIN 3-D as well. I had hoped it could be a real 3-D comic, but that was not to be. Because 3-D Man's adventures took place in the 1950s, Craig had to spend extensive time at a library doing research for the story's setting.

== Publication history ==
The character debuted in a three-issue run of the anthology series Marvel Premiere, issues #35–37 (1977). There are several graphic elements in these comics—the first issue in particular—that were intended for their originally planned 3-D presentation. Marvel Premiere was considered a 'try-out' book—successful features such as Doctor Strange and Iron Fist had previously been promoted to their own titles. However, 3-D Man did not receive such an honor, and instead would not appear again until the following year. He returned in What If #9 as part of a forgotten team of 1950s Avengers, with the rest of the roster made up of Atlas characters. Whereas What If stories usually took place in a branched reality, the events of the issue were intentionally left open-ended at the time the issue was published. It was then another couple of years until the character appeared again, in The Incredible Hulk #251–252 (1980), in a storyline which effectively wrote the character out of the present-day Marvel Universe. 3-D Man did make a brief cameo in Contest of Champions #1 in 1982, one of several remnants of the series actually being intended for publication in 1980.

The character then did not appear in print for 15 years, before resurfacing in Avengers Forever #4 (1999), which established that the events of What If #9 took place in an alternate reality. However, Avengers Forever writer Kurt Busiek would later revisit the character in his run on the main Avengers title, leading to 3-D Man featuring in The Avengers (vol. 3) #50–55 (2002) in the closing stages of the "Kang Dynasty" storyline in a plot that tied his fate in with Triathlon. After another period out of the limelight, the character returned in the 2008 Secret Invasion: Skrulls one-shot, which would lead to Triathlon taking on the 3-D Man mantle in Avengers: The Initiative #14.

== Fictional character biography ==
=== Chuck Chandler and Hal Chandler ===
Brothers Chuck Chandler and Hal Chandler were born in Los Angeles, California. As a test pilot for NASA in 1958, Chuck was piloting the experimental XF-13 rocket plane when he was captured by Skrull invaders. They attempted to interrogate him but Chuck escaped, damaging the Skrulls' warp drive in the process. The Skrull saucer exploded as Chuck flew away, exposing him to strange radiation. He crashed the XF-13 in the Mojave Desert and when his younger, crippled brother Hal attempted to rescue him, Chuck disappeared, and was believed dead. Hal, a research scientist, discovered that Chuck's image had been imprinted on the lenses of his glasses, and that Chuck had been transformed into a two-dimensional being. When Hal wore the glasses and concentrated, he triggered a dimensional shift that caused Chuck to materialize into a three-dimensional existence. In his new form Chuck wore a green and red bodysuit, and his normal strength, speed, and durability had been tripled. As the costumed 3-D Man, Chuck fought numerous Skrull infiltrators.

At some point after his 1950s adventures, Hal Chandler decided to retire as 3-D Man, leaving his brother stranded in another dimension. Hal married Peggy Clark, and they had two children, Chuck Chandler II and Hal Chandler, Jr. Hal later encountered a down-on-his-luck Bruce Banner and, afraid that the Hulk might show up, used the glasses to summon 3-D Man once more. After this encounter, 3-D Man returned into his brother's glasses, determined to never return.

=== Delroy Garrett ===
Delroy Garrett, initially known as Triathlon, is the second 3-D Man. He was empowered by the Triune Understanding using one of three "fragments of light" that gave Chuck Chandler his powers, which were created to counterbalance the emergence of an other-dimensional fragment of pure evil into Earth's dimension. Though initially unaware of his powers' source, Garrett later discovers both the truth and the third light pyramid, and uses the combined power of all three pyramids to release Hal and Chuck from captivity. After undergoing training as part of the Initiative, Garrett officially takes the identity of 3-D Man with the Chandlers' blessing.

== Powers and abilities ==
The Chandler brothers received their superhuman abilities through exposure to an unknown radiation in the explosion of a Skrull starship. Hal Chandler could, by concentrating on the image of his brother Chuck imprinted on his glasses, summon a superpowered version of his brother: 3-D Man. Chuck had a telepathic link with Hal, who would lose consciousness and become comatose when 3-D Man is active. 3-D Man's consciousness is apparently a synthesis of Chuck and Hal's minds, with Chuck's usually dominant. 3-D Man, in turn, could only remain in a three-dimensional reality for three hours at a time before Hal would wake up, causing 3-D Man to disappear and return to his two-dimensional existence. 3-D Man wore a specially designed NASA flight suit (circa late 1950s), altered in appearance and bonded to his skin. As 3-D Man, Chuck Chandler possesses approximately three times the physical capabilities of a fit but otherwise normal human male, giving him enhanced strength, durability, speed, and senses. In addition, 3-D Man can psychically perceive the distinctive aura of the Skrull race, even when a Skrull has assumed another form.

== Other versions ==
=== What If ===
In What If #9, 3-D Man is among the heroes assembled by Jimmy Woo, forming a short-lived incarnation of the Avengers. While the events of this story took place on an alternate Earth, similar events occurred in the 1950s of the mainstream continuity.
