= Silver Age of Comic Books =

Era of American comic books (1956–1970)

- Showcase #4 (October 1956), generally considered the start of the Silver Age; Cover art by Carmine Infantino and Joe Kubert
- Time span: 1956 – 1970

Related periods
- Preceded by: Golden Age of Comic Books (1938–1956)
- Followed by: Bronze Age of Comic Books (1970–1985)

The Silver Age of Comic Books was a period of artistic advancement and widespread commercial success in mainstream American comic books, predominantly those featuring the superhero archetype. Following the Golden Age of Comic Books, the Silver Age is considered to cover the period from 1956 to 1970, and was succeeded by the Bronze Age of Comic Books.

The popularity and circulation of comic books about superheroes had declined following World War II, and comic books about horror, crime and romance took larger shares of the market. However, controversy arose over alleged links between comic books and juvenile delinquency, focusing in particular on crime, horror, and superheroes. In 1954, publishers implemented the Comics Code Authority to regulate comic content.

In the wake of these changes, publishers began introducing superhero stories again, a change that began with the introduction of a new version of DC Comics' The Flash in Showcase #4 (October 1956). In response to strong demand, DC began publishing more superhero titles including Justice League of America, which prompted Marvel Comics to follow suit beginning with The Fantastic Four #1.

A number of important comics writers and artists contributed to the early part of the era, including writers Stan Lee, Gardner Fox, John Broome, and Robert Kanigher, and artists Jack Kirby, Curt Swan, Gil Kane, Steve Ditko, Mike Sekowsky, Gene Colan, Carmine Infantino, John Buscema, Jim Steranko, and John Romita Sr. Silver Age comics have become collectible, with a copy in the best condition known of Amazing Fantasy #15 (August 1962), the debut of Spider-Man, selling for $1.1 million in 2011. In 2022, a copy of The Fantastic Four #1 sold for $1.5 million.

== Origin of the term ==
Comics historian and movie producer Michael Uslan traces the origin of the "Silver Age" term to the letters column of Justice League of America #42 (February 1966), which went on sale December 9, 1965. Letter-writer Scott Taylor of Westport, Connecticut, wrote: "If you guys keep bringing back the heroes from the [1930s–1940s] Golden Age, people 20 years from now will be calling this decade the Silver Sixties!" According to Uslan, the natural hierarchy of gold-silver-bronze, as in Olympic medals, took hold: "Fans immediately glommed onto this, refining it more directly into a Silver Age version of the Golden Age. Very soon, it was in our vernacular, replacing such expressions as ... 'Second Heroic Age of Comics' or 'The Modern Age' of comics. It wasn't long before dealers were ... specifying it was a Golden Age comic for sale or a Silver Age comic for sale."

== History ==
=== Background ===
Spanning World War II, when American comics provided cheap and disposable escapist entertainment that could be read and then discarded by the troops, the Golden Age of comic books covered the late 1930s to the late 1940s. A number of major superheroes were created during this period, including Superman, Batman, Wonder Woman, Captain Marvel, and Captain America. In subsequent years comics were blamed for a rise in juvenile crime statistics, although this rise was shown to be in direct proportion to population growth. When juvenile offenders admitted to reading comics, it was seized on as a common denominator; one notable critic was Fredric Wertham, author of the book Seduction of the Innocent (1954), who attempted to shift the blame for juvenile delinquency from the parents of the children to the comic books they read. The result was a decline in the comics industry. To address public concerns, in 1954 the Comics Code Authority was created to regulate and curb sex, drugs and violence in comics.

Unsuccessful attempts to revive the superhero archetype's popularity include Captain Comet, who debuted in Strange Adventures #9 (June 1951); St. John Publishing Company's 1953 revival of Rocket Man under the title Zip-Jet; Fighting American, created in 1954 by the Captain America team of Joe Simon and Jack Kirby; Sterling Comics' Captain Flash and its backup feature Tomboy that same year; Ajax/Farrell Publishing's 1954–55 revival of the Phantom Lady; Charlton Comics' Nature Boy, introduced in March 1956, and its revival of the Blue Beetle the previous year; and Atlas Comics' short-lived revivals of Captain America, the Human Torch, and the Sub-Mariner, beginning in Young Men Comics #24 (December 1953). In the United Kingdom, the Marvelman series was published from 1954 to 1963, substituting for the British reprints of the Captain Marvel stories after Fawcett stopped publishing the character's adventures.

The talking animal superheroes Supermouse and Mighty Mouse were published continuously in their own titles from the end of the Golden Age through the beginning of the Silver Age. Atomic Mouse was given his own title in 1953, lasting ten years. Atomic Rabbit, later named Atomic Bunny, was published from 1955 to 1959.

By the mid-1950s, only three superheroes—Superman (and his younger incarnation as Superboy), Batman (with his sidekick Robin), and Wonder Woman—were still published under their own titles. According to DC comics writer Will Jacobs, Superman was available in "great quantity, but little quality". Batman and Robin were doing better, but Batman's comics were "lackluster" in comparison to his earlier "atmospheric adventures" of the 1940s, and Wonder Woman, having lost her original writer and artist, was no longer "idiosyncratic" or "interesting". Aquaman and Green Arrow (with his sidekick, Speedy) were also still appearing as back-up features in Adventure Comics, "the only other two superheroes" known to have remained continuously in print from the Golden Age as the Silver Age began.

=== DC Comics ===
The Silver Age began with the publication of DC Comics' Showcase #4 (October 1956), which introduced the modern version of the Flash, Barry Allen. Jacobs describes the arrival of Showcase #4 on the newsstands as "begging to be bought", the cover featured an undulating film strip depicting the Flash running so fast that he had escaped from the frame. Editor Julius Schwartz, writer Gardner Fox, and artist Carmine Infantino were some of the people behind the Flash's revitalization. Robert Kanigher wrote the first stories of the revived Flash, and John Broome was the writer of many of the earliest stories.

Although the Flash is generally regarded as the first superhero of the Silver Age, the introduction of the Martian Manhunter in Detective Comics #225 predates Showcase #4 by almost a year, and at least one historian considers this character the first Silver Age superhero. However, comics historian Craig Shutt, author of the Comics Buyer's Guide column "Ask Mister Silver Age", disagrees, noting that the Martian Manhunter debuted as a detective who used his alien abilities to solve crimes, in the "quirky detective" vein of contemporaneous DC characters who were "TV detectives, Indian detectives, supernatural detectives, [and] animal detectives". Shutt feels the Martian Manhunter only became a superhero in Detective Comics #273 (November 1959) when he received a secret identity and other superhero accoutrements, saying, "Had Flash not come along, I doubt that the Martian Manhunter would've led the charge from his backup position in Detective to a new super-hero age."

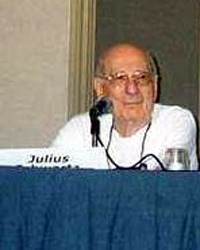
Julius Schwartz, an instrumental figure at DC during the Silver Age

With the success of Showcase #4, several other 1940s superheroes were reworked during Schwartz' tenure, including Green Lantern, Aquaman, the Atom, and Hawkman, and the Justice Society of America was reimagined as the Justice League of America. The DC artists responsible included Murphy Anderson, Gil Kane, Ramona Fradon, Mike Sekowsky, and Joe Kubert. Only the characters' names remained the same; their costumes, locales, and identities were altered, and imaginative scientific explanations for their superpowers generally took the place of magic as a modus operandi in their stories. Schwartz, a lifelong science-fiction fan, was the inspiration for the re-imagined Green Lantern—the Golden Age character, railroad engineer Alan Scott, possessed a ring powered by a magical lantern, but his Silver Age replacement, test pilot Hal Jordan, had a ring powered by an alien battery and created by an intergalactic police force, the Green Lantern Corps.

1958 saw the introduction of the Legion of Super-Heroes, a group of young superheroes from the 30th century inspired by Superboy. The founding members of the Legion - Cosmic Boy, Lightning Lad, and Saturn Girl - traveled to the 20th century to recruit Superboy himself, who traveled to the 30th century to join the Legion. Superboy eventually left the Legion and was replaced with Mon-El, who possesses similar powers to him. Initially supporting characters of Superman, the Legion proved popular, spawning a series of solo titles.

In the mid-1960s, DC established that characters appearing in comics published prior to the Silver Age lived on a parallel Earth the company dubbed Earth-Two. Characters introduced in the Silver Age and onward lived on Earth-One. The two realities were separated by a vibrational field that could be crossed, should a storyline involve superheroes from different worlds teaming up.

=== Marvel Comics ===
The Fantastic Four #1 (November 1961), the cornerstone of Marvel Comics Cover art by Jack Kirby (penciler)

DC Comics sparked the superhero revival with its publications from 1955 to 1960. Marvel Comics then capitalized on the revived interest in superhero storytelling with sophisticated stories and characterization. In contrast to previous eras, Marvel characters were "flawed and self-doubting".

DC added to its momentum with its 1960 introduction of Justice League of America, a team consisting of the company's most popular superhero characters. Martin Goodman, a publishing trend-follower with his 1950s Atlas Comics line,^{note 1} by this time called Marvel Comics, "mentioned that he had noticed one of the titles published by National Comics seemed to be selling better than most. It was a book called The [sic] Justice League of America and it was composed of a team of superheroes", Marvel editor Stan Lee recalled in 1974. Goodman directed Lee to likewise produce a superhero team book, resulting in The Fantastic Four #1 (November 1961).

Under the guidance of writer-editor Stan Lee and artists/co-plotters such as Jack Kirby and Steve Ditko, Marvel began its own rise to prominence. With an innovation that changed the comic-book industry, The Fantastic Four #1 initiated a naturalistic style of superheroes with human failings, fears, and inner demons, who squabbled and worried about the likes of rent-money. In contrast to the straitlaced archetypes of superheroes at the time, this ushered in a revolution. With dynamic artwork by Kirby, Steve Ditko, Don Heck, and others complementing Lee's colorful, catchy prose, the new style became popular among college students who could identify with the angst and the irreverent nature of the characters such as Spider-Man, the X-Men and the Hulk during a time period of social upheaval and the rise of the counterculture of the 1960s.

Comic books of the Silver Age explained superhero phenomena and origins through science, inspired by contemporary science fiction, as opposed to the Golden Age, which commonly relied on magic or mysticism.

Comics historian Peter Sanderson compares the 1960s DC to a large Hollywood studio, and argues that after having reinvented the superhero archetype, DC by the latter part of the decade was suffering from a creative drought. The audience for comics was no longer just children, and Sanderson sees the 1960s Marvel as the comic equivalent of the French New Wave, developing new methods of storytelling that drew in and retained readers who were in their teens and older and thus influencing the comics writers and artists of the future.

=== Other publishers ===
One of the few most-selling American comics publishers in 1956, Harvey Comics, discontinued its horror comics when the Comics Code was implemented and sought a new target audience. Harvey's focus shifted to children from 6 to 12 years of age, especially girls, with characters such as Richie Rich, Casper the Friendly Ghost, and Little Dot. Many of the company's comics featured young girls who "defied stereotypes and sent a message of acceptance of those who are different". Although its characters have inspired a number of nostalgic films and ranges of merchandise, Harvey comics of the period are not nearly as sought after in the collectors' market in contrast to DC and Marvel titles.

The publishers Gilberton, Dell Comics, and Gold Key Comics used their reputations as publishers of wholesome comic books to avoid becoming signatories to the Comics Code and found various ways to continue publishing horror-themed comics in addition to other types. Gilberton's extensive Classics Illustrated line adapted literary classics, with the likes of Frankenstein alongside Don Quixote and Oliver Twist; Classics Illustrated Junior reprinted comic book versions of children's classics such as The Wizard of Oz, Rapunzel, and Pinocchio. During the late 1950s and the 1960s, Dell, which had published comics in 1936, offered licensed TV series comic books from Twilight Zone to Top Cat, as well as numerous Walt Disney titles. Its successor, Gold Key—founded in 1962 after Western Publishing started its own label rather than packaging content for business partner Dell—continued with such licensed TV series and movie adaptations, as well as comics starring such Warner Bros. Cartoons characters as Bugs Bunny and such comic strip properties as Beetle Bailey.

With the popularity of the Batman television show in 1966, publishers that had specialized in other forms began adding campy superhero titles to their lines. As well, new publishers sprang up, often using creative talent from the Golden Age. Harvey Comics' Harvey Thriller imprint released Double-Dare Adventures, starring new characters such as Bee-Man and Magicmaster. Dell published superhero versions of Frankenstein, Dracula and the Werewolf. Gold Key did licensed versions of live-action and animated superhero television shows such as Captain Nice, Frankenstein Jr. and The Impossibles, and continued the adventures of Walt Disney Pictures' Goofy character in Supergoof. American Comics Group gave its established character Herbie a secret superhero identity as the Fat Fury, and introduced the characters of Nemesis and Magic-Man. Even the iconic Archie Comics teens acquired super powers and superhero identities in comedic titles such as Archie as Capt. Pureheart and Jughead as Captain Hero. Archie Comics also launched its Archie Adventure line (subsequently titled Mighty Comics), which included the Fly, the Jaguar, and a revamp of the Golden Age hero the Shield. In addition to their individual titles, they teamed in their group series The Mighty Crusaders, joined by the Comet and Flygirl. Their stories blended typical superhero fare with the 1960s camp.

Among straightforward Silver Age superheroes from publishers other than Marvel or DC, Charlton Comics offered a short-lived superhero line with characters that included Captain Atom, Judomaster, the Question, and Thunderbolt; Tower Comics had Dynamo, Mercury Man, NoMan and other members of the superhero espionage group T.H.U.N.D.E.R. Agents; and even Gold Key had Doctor Solar, Man of the Atom.

=== Underground comics ===
According to John Strausbaugh of The New York Times, "traditional" comic book historians feel that although the Silver Age deserves study, the only noteworthy aspect of the Silver Age was the advent of underground comics. One commentator has suggested that, "Perhaps one of the reasons underground comics have come to be considered legitimate art is due to the fact that the work of these artists more truly embodies what much of the public believes is true of newspaper strips—that they are written and drawn (i.e., authentically signed by) a single person." While a large number of mainstream-comics professionals both wrote and drew their own material during the Silver Age, as many had since the start of American comic books, their work is distinct from what another historian describes as the "raw id on paper" of Robert Crumb and Gilbert Shelton. Most often published in black-and-white with glossy color cover and distributed through counterculture bookstores and head shops, underground comics targeted adults and reflected the counterculture movement of the time.

=== End and aftermath ===
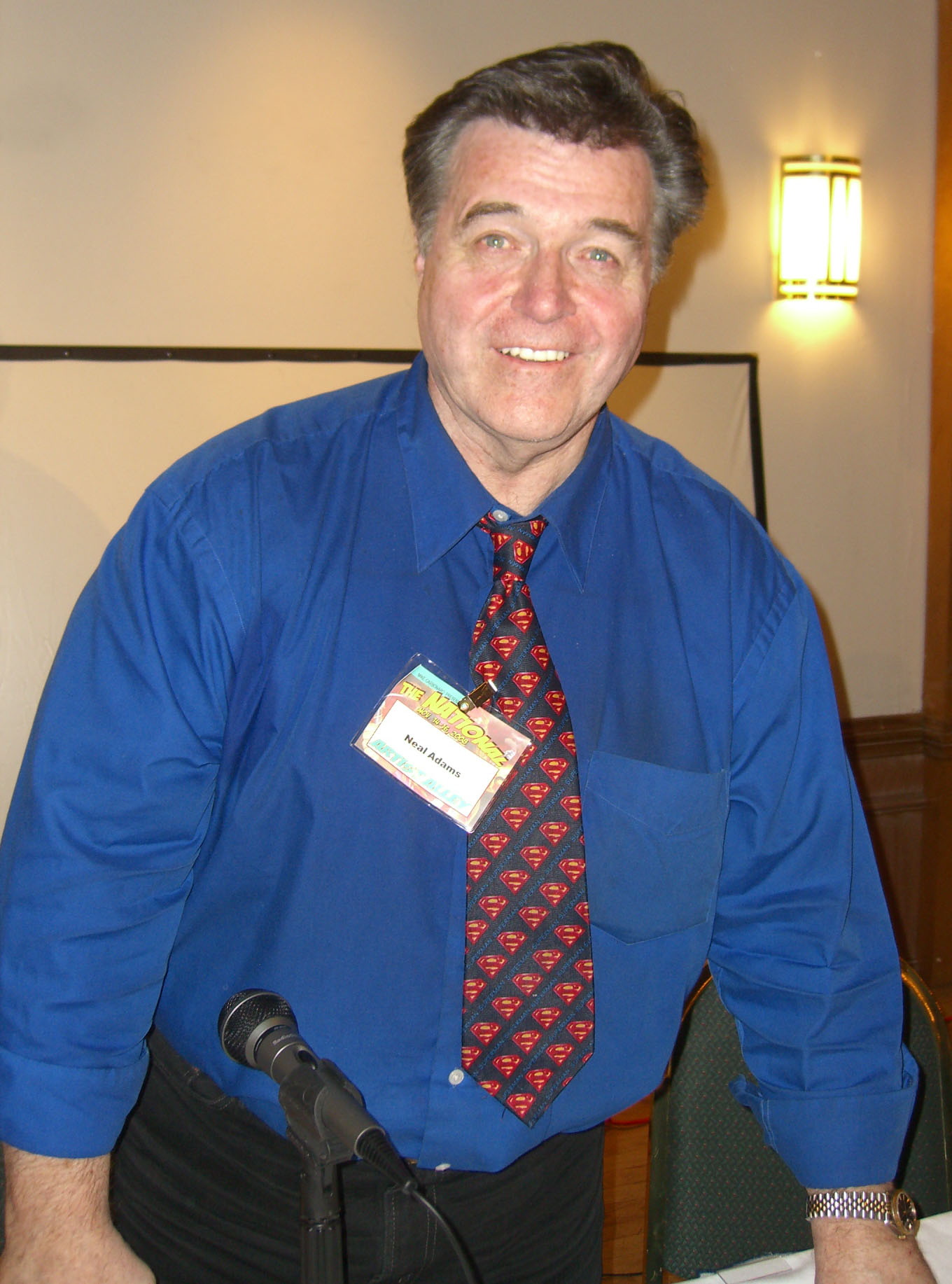
Artist Neal Adams, whose work with writer Denny O'Neil on Green Lantern/Green Arrow marks one possibility for the end of the Silver Age

The Silver Age of comic books was followed by the Bronze Age. The demarcation is not clearly defined, but there are a number of possibilities.

Historian Will Jacobs suggests the Silver Age ended in April 1970 when the man who had started it, Julius Schwartz, handed over Green Lantern—starring one of the first revived heroes of the era—to the new-guard team of Denny O'Neil and Neal Adams in response to reduced sales. John Strausbaugh also connects the end of the Silver Age to Green Lantern. He observes that in 1960, the character embodied the can-do optimism of the era. However, by 1972 Green Lantern had become world-weary, with the character saying in one story, "Those days are gone—gone forever—the days I was confident, certain ... I was so young ... so sure I couldn't make a mistake! Young and cocky, that was Green Lantern. Well, I've changed. I'm older now ... maybe wiser, too ... and a lot less happy." Strausbaugh writes that the Silver Age "went out with that whimper".

Comics scholar Arnold T. Blumberg places the end of the Silver Age in June 1973, when Gwen Stacy, girlfriend of Peter Parker (Spider-Man), was killed in a story arc later dubbed "The Night Gwen Stacy Died", saying the era of "innocence" was ended by "the 'snap' heard round the comic book world—the startling, sickening snap of bone that heralded the death of Gwen Stacy." Silver Age historian Craig Shutt disputes this, saying, "Gwen Stacy's death shocked Spider-Man readers. Such a tragedy makes a strong symbolic ending. This theory gained adherents when Kurt Busiek and Alex Ross's Marvels miniseries in 1994 ended with Gwen's death, but I'm not buying it. It's too late. Too many new directions—especially [the sword-and-sorcery trend begun by the character] Conan and monsters [in the wake of the Comics Code allowing vampires, werewolves and the like]—were on firm ground by this time." He also dismisses the end of the 12-cent comic book, which went to 15 cents as the industry standard in early 1969, noting that the 1962 hike from 10 cents to 12 cents had no bearing in this regard. Shutt's line comes with Fantastic Four #102 (September 1970), Jack Kirby's last regular-run issue before the artist left to join DC Comics; this combines with DC's Superman #229 (August 1970), editor Mort Weisinger's last before retiring.

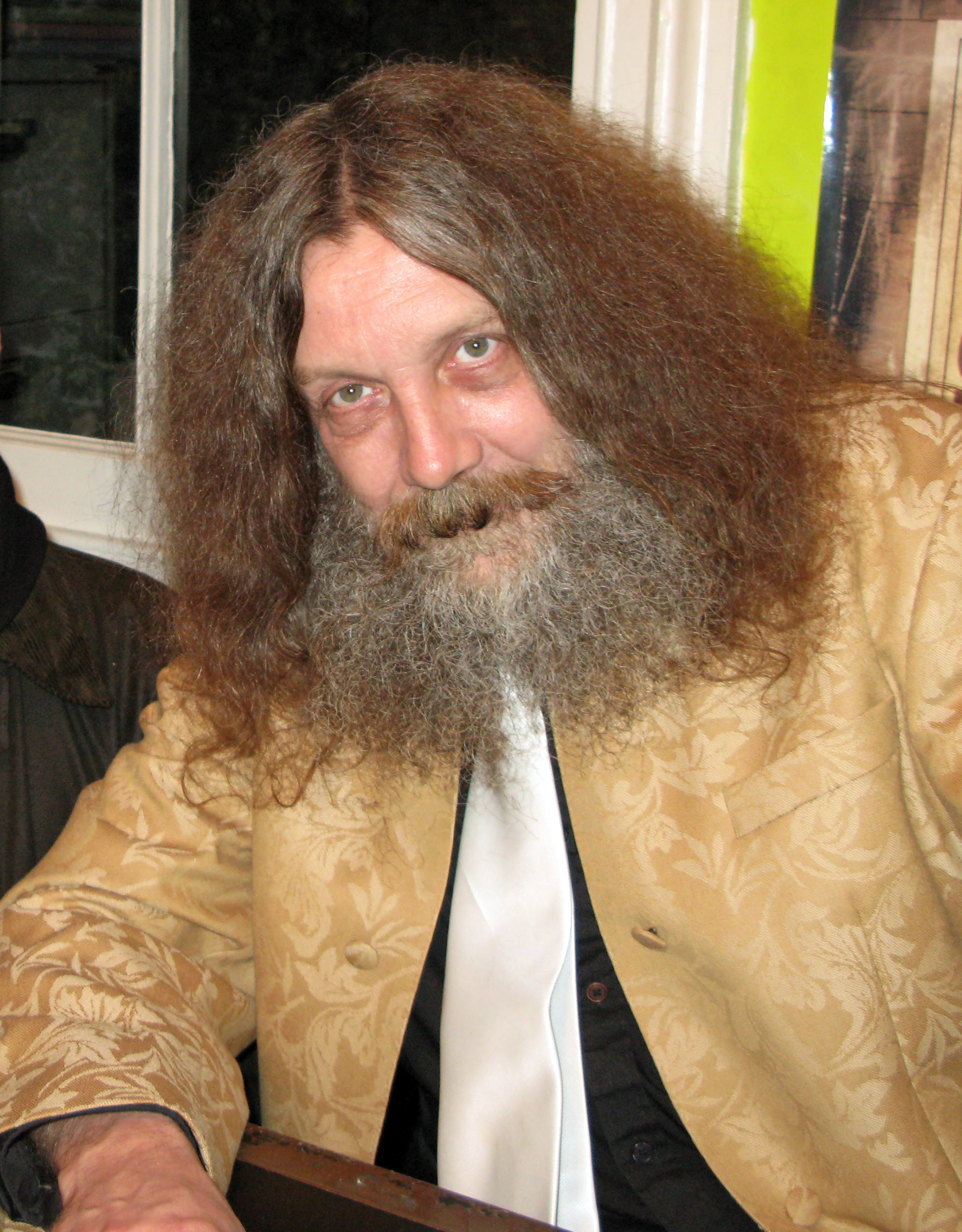
Alan Moore, who began the "neo-silver movement" with a 1986 Superman story

According to historian Peter Sanderson, the "neo-silver movement" that began in 1986 with Superman: Whatever Happened to the Man of Tomorrow? by Alan Moore and Curt Swan, was a backlash against the Bronze Age with a return to Silver Age principles. In Sanderson's opinion, each comics generation rebels against the previous, and the movement was a response to Crisis on Infinite Earths, which itself was an attack on the Silver Age. Neo-silver comics creators made comics that recognized and assimilated the more sophisticated aspects of the Silver Age.

== Legacy ==
The Silver Age marked a decline in horror, crime, romance, talking animal humor, and Westerns as American-comics genres.

An important feature of the period was the development of the character makeup of superheroes. Young children and girls were targeted during the Silver Age by certain publishers; in particular, Harvey Comics attracted this group with titles such as Little Dot. Adult-oriented underground comics also began during the Silver Age.

Some critics and historians argue that one characteristic of the Silver Age was that science fiction and aliens replaced magic and gods. Others argue that magic was an important element of both Golden Age and Silver Age characters. Many Golden Age writers and artists were science-fiction fans or professional science-fiction writers who incorporated SF elements into their comic-book stories. Science was a common explanation for the origin of heroes in the Silver Age.

The Silver Age coincided with the rise of pop art, an artistic movement that used popular cultural artifacts, such as advertising and packaging, as source material for fine, or gallery-exhibited, art. Roy Lichtenstein, one of the best-known pop art painters, specifically chose individual panels from comic books and repainted the images, modifying them to some extent in the process but including in the painting word and thought balloons and captions as well as enlarged-to-scale color dots imitating the coloring process then used in newsprint comic books. An exhibition of comic strip art was held at the Musée des Arts Décoratifs of the Palais de Louvre in 1967, and books were soon published that contained serious discussions of the art of comics and the nature of the medium.

In January 1966, a live-action Batman television show debuted to high ratings. Circulation for comic books in general and Batman merchandise in particular soared. Other masked or superpowered adventurers appeared on the television screen, so that "American TV in the winter of 1967 appeared to consist of little else but live-action and animated cartoon comic-book heroes, all in living colour." Existing comic-book publishers began creating superhero titles, as did new publishers. By the end of the 1960s, however, the fad had faded; in 1969, the best-selling comic book in the United States was not a superhero series, but the teen-humor book Archie.

Swedish cartoonist Joakim Lindengren draws a Silver Age pastiche in his Kapten Stofil comic book series (1998–2009) about the powers of nostalgia in a grumpy, old comic book named Captain Geezer who longs to return to the Silver Age. Lindengren also borrows many elements from Silver Age comics in United States of Banana, a comic book he created with Puerto Rican author Giannina Braschi.

== Artists ==
Nick Fury: Agent of S.H.I.E.L.D. #7 (December 1968) Cover art by Jim Steranko, whose work here owes a debt to Salvador Dalí

Arlen Schumer, author of The Silver Age of Comic Book Art, singles out Carmine Infantino's Flash as the embodiment of the design of the era: "as sleek and streamlined as the fins Detroit was sporting on all its models". Other notable pencilers of the era include Curt Swan, Gene Colan, Steve Ditko, Gil Kane, Jack Kirby, Joe Kubert, Don Heck, George Tuska, Dick Ayers, and John Romita Sr.

Two artists that changed the comics industry dramatically in the late 1960s were Neal Adams, considered one of his country's greatest draftsmen, and Jim Steranko. Both artists expressed a cinematic approach at times that occasionally altered the more conventional panel-based format that had been commonplace for decades. Adams' breakthrough was based on layout and rendering. Best known for returning Batman to his somber roots after the campy success of the Batman television show, his naturalistic depictions of anatomy, faces, and gestures changed comics' style in a way that Strausbaugh sees reflected in modern graphic novels.

One of the few writer-artists at the time, Steranko made use of a cinematic style of storytelling. Strausbaugh credits him as one of Marvel's strongest creative forces during the late 1960s, his art owing a large debt to Salvador Dalí. Steranko started by inking and penciling the details of Kirby's artwork on Nick Fury, Agent of S.H.I.E.L.D. beginning in Strange Tales #151, but by Strange Tales #155 Stan Lee had put him in charge of both writing and drawing Fury's adventures. He exaggerated the James Bond-style spy stories, introducing the vortex beam (which lifts objects), the aphonic bomb (which explodes silently), a miniature electronic absorber (which protected Fury from electricity), and the Q-ray machine (a molecular disintegrator)—all in his first 11-page story.

== Collectibility ==
Title & Issue	Cover date	Publisher	Relevance
Detective Comics #225	Nov. 1955	DC	First appearance of Martian Manhunter
Showcase #4	Oct. 1956	DC	First appearance of the Silver Age Flash (Barry Allen) First Silver Age comic.
Showcase #9	Aug. 1957	DC	First of two pilot issues for the feature "Superman's Girl Friend, Lois Lane"
Adventure Comics #247	April 1958	DC	First appearance of the Legion of Super-Heroes
Adventure Comics #260	May 1959	DC	First appearance of the Silver Age Aquaman
Action Comics #252	May 1959	DC	First appearance of Supergirl (Kara Zor-El), cousin to Superman
Showcase #22	Oct. 1959	DC	First appearance of Green Lantern (Hal Jordan)
The Brave and the Bold #28	March 1960	DC	First gathering of DC's superheroes as the Justice League of America
Richie Rich #1	Nov. 1960	Harvey	Richie Rich gets his own title.
Showcase #30	Feb. 1961	DC	First of four pilot issues for Aquaman
The Brave and the Bold #34	March 1961	DC	First appearance of the Silver Age Hawkman and Hawkgirl
The Flash #123	Sept. 1961	DC	Reappearance of the Golden Age Flash; introduction of Earth-Two
Showcase #34	Oct. 1961	DC	First appearance of the Silver Age Atom
The Fantastic Four #1	Nov. 1961	Marvel	First appearance of the Fantastic Four
Tales to Astonish #27	Jan. 1962	Marvel	First appearance of Hank Pym, the future Ant-Man
The Incredible Hulk #1	May 1962	Marvel	First appearance of the Hulk
The Fantastic Four #5	July 1962	Marvel	First appearance of Doctor Doom
Amazing Fantasy #15	Aug. 1962	Marvel	First appearance of Spider-Man (Peter Parker)
Journey into Mystery #83	Aug. 1962	Marvel	First appearance of Thor (Thor Odinson / Donald Blake)
Tales to Astonish #35	Sept. 1962	Marvel	First appearance of Ant-Man (Henry Pym)
Doctor Solar, Man of the Atom #1	Oct. 1962	Gold Key	First appearance of Doctor Solar
Magnus, Robot Fighter #1	Feb. 1963	Gold Key	First appearance of Magnus, Robot Fighter
Tales of Suspense #39	March 1963	Marvel	First appearance of Iron Man (Tony Stark)
Strange Tales #110	Jul. 1963	Marvel	First appearance of Doctor Strange
Justice League of America #21	Aug. 1963	DC	Reappearance of the Golden Age Justice Society of America
The X-Men #1	Sept. 1963	Marvel	First appearance of the X-Men and Magneto
The Avengers #1	Sept. 1963	Marvel	First gathering of Marvel's superheroes as the Avengers
The Avengers #4	March 1964	Marvel	Reappearance of Captain America (Steve Rogers) from the Golden Age of Comic Books
Daredevil #1	April 1964	Marvel	First appearance of Daredevil
The Brave and the Bold #54	June 1965	DC	First appearance of the Teen Titans
Detective Comics #359	Jan. 1967	DC	First appearance of Batgirl (Barbara Gordon)
Green Lantern #76	April 1970	DC	"The New Green Lantern / Green Arrow" tackles social issues

== Footnotes ==
Apocryphal legend has it that in 1961, Timely and Atlas publisher Martin Goodman was playing golf with either Jack Liebowitz or Irwin Donenfeld of rival DC Comics (then known as National Periodical Publications), who bragged about DC's success with the Justice League of America, which had debuted in The Brave and the Bold #28 (Feb. 1960) before going on to its own title.

Film producer and comics historian Michael Uslan later contradicted some specifics, while supporting the story's framework:

Irwin said he never played golf with Goodman, so the story is untrue. I heard this story more than a couple of times while sitting in the lunchroom at DC's 909 Third Avenue and 75 Rockefeller Plaza office as Sol Harrison and [production chief] Jack Adler were schmoozing with some of us ... who worked for DC during our college summers. ... [T]he way I heard the story from Sol was that Goodman was playing with one of the heads of Independent News, not DC Comics (though DC owned Independent News). ... As the distributor of DC Comics, this man certainly knew all the sales figures and was in the best position to tell this tidbit to Goodman. ... Of course, Goodman would want to be playing golf with this fellow and be in his good graces. ... Sol worked closely with Independent News' top management over the decades and would have gotten this story straight from the horse's mouth.
