= Warfront =

Publication information
- Publisher: Harvey Comics
- Schedule: Bi-monthly
- Format: Anthology
- Publication date: Sept. 1951 – Feb. 1967
- No. of issues: 39

Warfront was a war comic published by Harvey Comics. The comic claimed to depict "True War Exposes". The first issue of Warfront was September 1951. From January 1956 – September 1958 the covers of Warfront were rendered by Jack Kirby.

== Publication history ==
The first 35 issues of Warfront were published from Sept. 1951 – Nov. 1958, with issues #26–35 published under the Thrill Adventure imprint. After a seven-year hiatus, issues #36–39 were published from 1965 to 1967 under the Harvey Thriller imprint. The final issue of Warfront was #39 (September 1967).

== Covers and themes ==
The cover of issue #28 (January 1956) shows a bomber engulfed in flames. "The Secret Bridge", an original six page story inside, concerns a French volunteer. He helps settle a dispute two soldiers are having during the Korean War. The Bob Powell studio embellished each panel (comics) with detailed backgrounds and expressionistic lighting schemes. Most of the cover is occupied by one of the plane's parachuting crew members. The man is firing what appears to be a combination of a carbine and a submachine gun. The weapon is being aimed at unseen enemy fighters. Warfront #29 (September 1957) shows a marine firing his tommy gun into a destroyed bunker. This kills the remaining survivors.
