= Harvey Thriller =

Comic book imprint

- Parent company: Harvey Comics
- Status: defunct, 1967
- Founded: 1965
- Country of origin: United States
- Headquarters location: New York City
- Key people: Joe Simon
- Publication types: Comic books
- Fiction genres: Superhero

Harvey Thriller was a comic book imprint used by Harvey Comics for their brief foray into publishing super heroes and other non-'kiddie' comics in the mid-1960s. Overseen by Joe Simon, all the titles featured work by many well-known creators, including Jack Kirby, Bob Powell, Wally Wood, Otto Binder, and the earliest known work by Jim Steranko.

== History ==
=== Thrill Adventure ===
While Harvey Comics has for decades been known for their many kids' comics, such as Casper the Friendly Ghost, Richie Rich, etc., they have published other kinds of comics over the years. From 1955 to 1962, most of their non-kid comic output was done under the "Thrill Adventure" line, under the editorship of Joe Simon, after which they stopped publishing any non-kid comics.

=== Harvey Thriller ===
In the mid-1960s, with the camp craze created by the Batman television series, Harvey approached Joe Simon again to oversee a new line of comics, mainly superheroes, but with science fiction/fantasy stories thrown in as well. They also continued the Thrill Adventures title Warfront, after a 7-year hiatus.

The line started off with one-shots Unearthly Spectaculars #1, Thrill-O-Rama #1, Blast-Off #1, and Warfront #36 in October 1965, using work that was apparently done for the 1950s Thrill Adventure line. The next issues did not come out until almost a year later in September 1966. Along with the new titles were two reprint titles for Fighting American and The Spirit, which did include new stories for these characters.

The line was unsuccessful, and all of the titles ended abruptly with the March 1967 issues. House ads showed the covers for Jigsaw #3 and Thrill-O-Rama #3, but those issues were never published.

=== Later attempts ===
After the line failed, Harvey stuck to producing children's comics until 1993. In 1993, there were later attempts to push Harvey Comics out of the kiddie market by launching two new sublabels, Nemesis Comics, which was used for teen and adult titles, mainly in the genre of superheroes, horror, and action/adventure, introduced in November 1993, and Ultracomics, which was used for comics based on the Ultraman comics, introduced earlier in February 1993.

Among titles from the Nemesis Comics imprint were new issues of Ultraman, and SeaQuest DSV, plus an original IP, Frank, created by Dan Chichester, Craig Mitchell and Denys Cowan, which was a modern-day reimagining of Frankenstein. The company is also slated to publish new issues of T.H.U.N.D.E.R. Agents, a revival of the 1960s Tower Comics series. The labels eventually shuttered in 1994 after Marvel Comics took over publication of the Harvey Comics titles.

== Titles published ==
=== Thrill Adventure ===
- Alarming Adventures (1962–63) #1-3 (SF/fantasy)
- Alarming Tales (1957–58) #1-6 (SF/suspense)
- Black Cat Western (1955) #54-56
- Black Cat Mystery (1956) #57
- Black Cat Mystic (1956–58) #58-62
- Chamber of Clues (1955) #27-28 (detective)
- Man in Black (1957–58) #1-4
- Race for the Moon (1958) #1-3 (intro 3 Rocketeers in #3)
- Thrills of Tomorrow (1955) #19-20 (Stuntman, Boy Explorers reprints)
- Warfront (1955–1958) #26-35
- Western Tales (1955–56) #31-33
- Witches Western Tales (1955) #29-30

=== Harvey Thriller ===
- Blast Off (1965) #1 (3 Rocketeers, stuff intended for Race for the Moon #4)
- Double-Dare Adventures (1966–67) 2 issues (Bee-man, Glowing Gladiator, Magic Master)
- Fighting American (1966), 1 issue
- Jigsaw (1966), 2 issues
- Spirit (1966–67), 2 issues
- Spyman (1966–67), 3 issues
- Thrill-O-Rama (1965–66), 3 issues (Man in Black-Fate, Pirana #2-on)
- Unearthly Spectaculars (1965–67), 3 issues (Tiger Boy, Jack Q Frost, 3 Rocketeers, Miracles, Inc, Earthman)
- Warfront (1965–67) #36-39 (Dynamite Joe, Lone Tiger in 2nd issue)

=== Later attempts ===
- Frank (1994) #1-4 (Nemesis)
- seaQuest DSV (1994) #1 (Nemesis)
- Ultraman (1993) #1-3 (Ultracomics)
- Ultraman (1994) #1-4 (Nemesis Comics)

== Harvey Thriller characters ==
- Bee-Man
- Captain 3-D (owned by Simon and Kirby)
- Dynamite Joe the Blast Crazy Marine (owned by Joe Simon)
- Fighting American (owned by Joe Simon)
- Glowing Gladiator
- Jack Q. Frost
- Jigsaw (owned by Joe Simon)
- Magicmaster
- Man in Black
- Miracles, Inc
- Pirana (owned by Joe Simon)
- Spyman (owned by Joe Simon)
- Tiger Boy (owned by Joe Simon)
- 3 Rocketeers (owned by Joe Simon)
