= Jim Steranko =

American artist (born 1938)

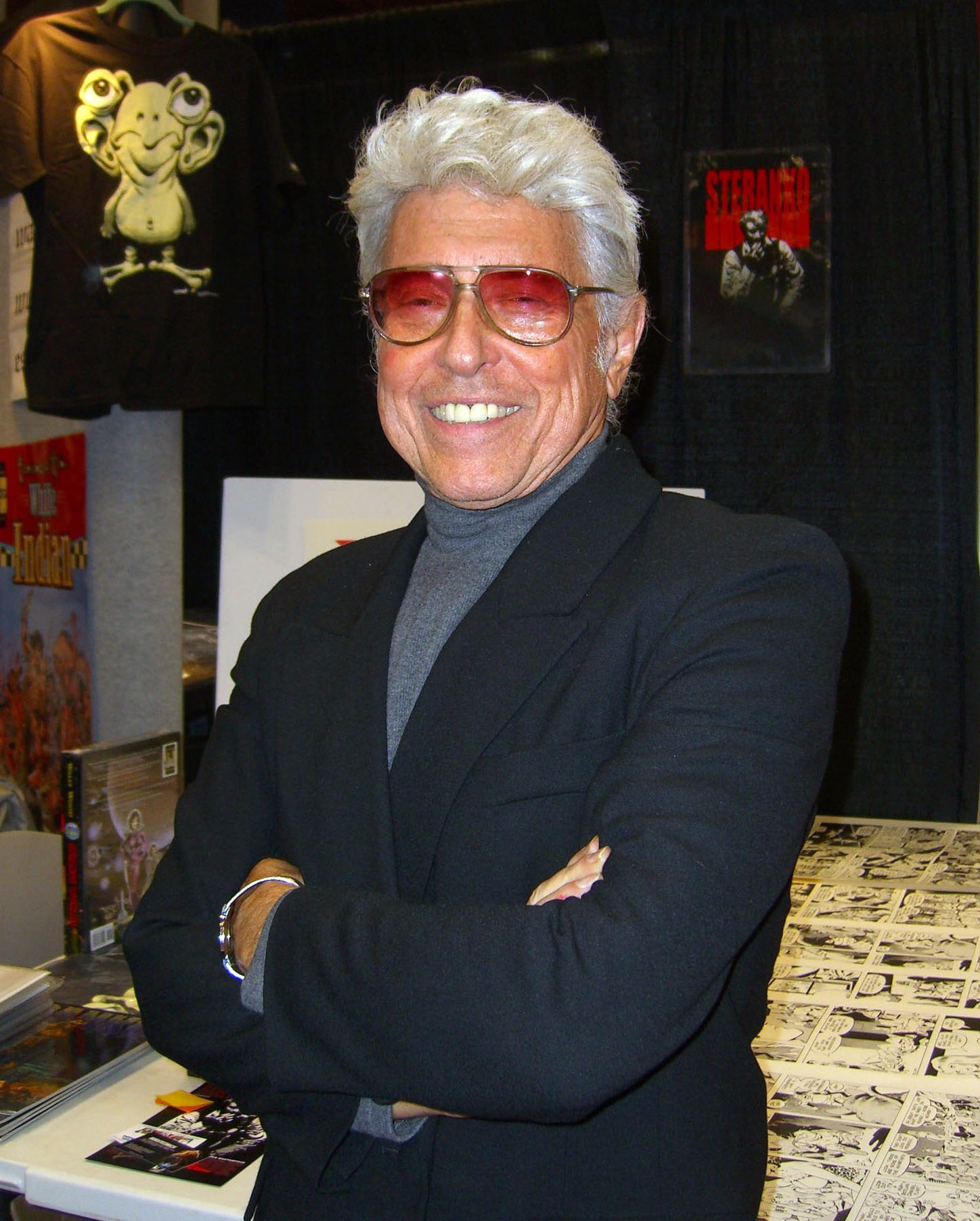
- Steranko in 2012
- Born: James F. Steranko; November 5, 1938 (age 88) Reading, Pennsylvania, U.S.
- Areas: Writer, Artist, Publisher
- Notable works: Nick Fury, Agent of S.H.I.E.L.D.; "The Strange Death of Captain America"; The Steranko History of Comics; Mediascene / Prevue

James F. Steranko (/stəˈræŋkoʊ/; born November 5, 1938) is an American graphic artist, comic book writer/artist, comics historian, magician, publisher and film production illustrator.

His most famous comic book work was with the 1960s superspy feature "Nick Fury, Agent of S.H.I.E.L.D." in Marvel Comics' Strange Tales and in the subsequent eponymous series. Steranko earned lasting acclaim for his innovations in sequential art during the Silver Age of Comic Books, particularly his infusion of surrealism, pop art, and graphic design into the medium. His work has been published in many countries and his influence on the field has remained strong since his comics heyday. He went on to create book covers, become a comics historian who published a pioneering two-volume history of the birth and early years of comic books, and to create conceptual art and character designs for films including Raiders of the Lost Ark and Bram Stoker's Dracula.

He was inducted into the comic-book industry's Will Eisner Comic Book Hall of Fame in 2006.

== Early life ==
Steranko was born in Reading, Pennsylvania. According to Steranko's authorized biography, his grandparents emigrated from Ukraine to settle in the anthracite coal-mining region of eastern Pennsylvania. Steranko's father, one of nine siblings, began working in the mines at age 10, and as an adult became a tinsmith. Steranko later said his father and uncles "would bootleg coal – they would go up into a mountain and open up a shaft." One of three children, all boys, Steranko spent his early childhood during the American Great Depression living in a three-room house with a tar-paper roof and outhouse toilet facilities. He slept on a couch in the nominal living room until he was more than 10 years old. Steranko's father and five uncles showed musical inclination, performing in a band that played on Reading radio in the 1930s, Steranko has said.

Steranko recalled beginning school at age 4. Later, "Because my father had tuberculosis (and I tested positive), I began third grade at what was called an 'open-window' school, a facility across the city that had a healthy program for kids with special problems. I was bused to school for four years, then dropped into standard junior high." There, being smaller and younger than his classmates, he found himself a target for bullies and young gang-members until he studied boxing and self-defense at the local YMCA and began to successfully fight back. His youngest brother was born when Steranko was 14, "severing even the minimal interaction between me and my parents."

Steranko had begun drawing while very young, opening and flattening envelopes from the mail to use as sketch paper. Despite his father's denigration of Steranko's artistic talent, and the boy's ambition to become an architect, Steranko paid for his art supplies by collecting discarded soda bottles for the bottle deposit and bundled old newspapers to sell to scrap-paper dealers. He studied the Sunday comic strip art of Milton Caniff, Alex Raymond, Hal Foster, and Chester Gould, as well as the characters of Walt Disney and Superman, provided in "boxes of comics" brought to him by an uncle. Radio programs, Saturday movie matinées and serials, and other popular culture also influenced him.

Steranko in 1978 described some influences and their impact on his creative philosophy:

Early influences were Chester Gould's [comic strip] Dick Tracy (not particularly in my drawing style but in subject matter and an approach to drama), Hal Foster, and Frank Robbins' [comic strip] Johnny Hazard. I still think Robbins is one of the greatest storytellers of all time. Fans seem to have a lot less [of an] opinion of Robbins for some reason, just because they're more enamored of lines. Fans seem to think that the more lines that go into a drawing the better it is. Actually, the opposite is generally true. The fewer lines you can put into a drawing the quicker it reads, and the simpler it is. [Alex] Toth is one of the few guys who can simplify an illustration to a minimum of lines with a maximum of impact.

== Career ==
=== Illusionist and musician ===
By his account, Steranko learned stage magic using paraphernalia from his father's stage magician act, and in his teens spent several summers working with circuses and carnivals, working his way up to sideshow performer as a fire-eater and in acts involving a bed of nails and sleight-of-hand. At school, he competed on the gymnastics team, on the rings and parallel bars, and later took up boxing and, under swordmaster Dan Phillips in New York City, fencing. At 17, Steranko and another teenage boy were arrested for a string of burglaries and car thefts in Pennsylvania.

Steranko's first published comic book art: inset in artist George Tuska's cover of Harvey Comics' Spyman #1 (Sept. 1966)

Up through his early 20s, Steranko performed as an illusionist, escape artist, close-up magician in nightclubs, and musician, having played in drum and bugle corps in his teens before forming his own bands during the early days of rock and roll. Steranko, whose first band, in 1956, was called The Lancers, did not perform under his own name, claiming he used pseudonyms to help protect himself from enemies. He also claims to have put the first go-go girls onstage. The seminal rock and roll group Bill Haley and his Comets was based in nearby Philadelphia and Steranko, who played a Jazzmaster guitar, often performed in the same local venues, sometimes on the same bill, and became friendly with Haley guitarist Frank Beecher, who became a musical influence. By the late 1960s, Steranko was a member of a New York City magicians' group, the Witchdoctor's Club.

Comics historian Mark Evanier notes that the influential comic-book creator Jack Kirby, who "based some of his characters ... on people in his life or in the news", was "inspired" to create the escape artist character Mister Miracle "by an earlier career of writer-artist Jim Steranko".

=== Early art career ===
During the day, Steranko made his living as an artist for a printing company in his hometown of Reading, designing and drawing pamphlets and flyers for local dance clubs and the like. He moved on after five years to join an advertising agency, where he designed ads and drew products ranging from "baby carriages to beer cans". Interested in writing and drawing for comic books, he visited DC Comics as a fan and was treated to a tour of the office by editor Julius Schwartz, who gave Steranko a copy of a script featuring the science-fiction adventurer Adam Strange. Steranko recalled in 2003, "It was the first full script I'd ever seen, complete with panel descriptions and dialogue. I learned a lot from it and eventually went on to create a few comics of my own."

He initially entered the comics industry in 1957, not long out of high school, working for a short time inking pencil art by Vince Colletta and Matt Baker in Colletta's New York City studio before returning to Reading. In 1966, he landed assignments at Harvey Comics under editor Joe Simon, who as one writer described was "trying to create a line of super heroes within a publishing company that had specialized in anthropomorphic animals." Here Steranko created and wrote the characters Spyman, Magicmaster and the Gladiator for the company's short-lived superhero line, Harvey Thriller. His first published comics art came in Spyman #1 (Sept. 1966), for which he wrote the 20-page story "The Birth of a Hero" and penciled the first page, which included a diagram of a robotic hand that was reprinted as an inset on artist George Tuska's cover.

Steranko also approached Marvel Comics in 1966. He met with editor Stan Lee, who had Steranko ink a two-page Jack Kirby sample of typical art for the superspy feature "Nick Fury Agent of S.H.I.E.L.D." Steranko self-published it in 1970 in the limited-edition "Steranko Portfolio One"; it appeared again 30 years later in slightly altered form in the 2000 trade-paperback collection Nick Fury, Agent of S.H.I.E.L.D. This led to Lee's assigning him the Nick Fury feature in Strange Tales, a "split book" that shared each issue with another feature. Future Marvel editor-in-chief Roy Thomas, then a staff writer, recalled,

[H]e came up to the office ... and I was sent out by Sol [Brodsky] to look at his work and basically brush him off. Stan was busy and didn't want to be bothered that day. But when I saw Jim's work, ... on an impulse I took it in to Sol and said, 'I think Stan should see this'. Sol agreed, and took it in to Stan. Stan brought Steranko into his office, and Jim left with the 'S.H.I.E.L.D.' assignment. ... I think Jim's legacy to Marvel was demonstrating that there were ways in which the Kirby style could be mutated, and many artists went off increasingly in their own directions after that.

=== Silver Age Steranko ===
Lee and Kirby had initiated the 12-page "Nick Fury, Agent of S.H.I.E.L.D." feature in Strange Tales #135 (Aug. 1965), with Kirby supplying such inventive and enduring gadgets and hardware as the Helicarrier – an airborne aircraft carrier – as well as LMDs (Life Model Decoys) and even automobile airbags. Marvel's all-purpose terrorist organization Hydra was introduced here as well.

Steranko began his stint on the feature by penciling and inking "finishes" over Kirby layouts in Strange Tales #151 (Dec. 1966), just as many fellow new Marvel artists did at the time. Two issues later, Steranko took over full penciling and also began drawing the every-other-issue "Nick Fury" cover art. Then, in a rarity for comics artists of the era, he took over the series' writing with #155 (April 1967), following Roy Thomas, who had succeeded Lee. In another break with custom, he himself, rather than a Marvel staff artist, had become the series' uncredited colorist by that issue.

"Nick Fury, Agent of S.H.I.E.L.D." soon became one of the creative zeniths of the Silver Age, and one of comics' most groundbreaking, innovative and acclaimed features. Wrote Les Daniels, in his Comix: A History of Comic Books in America, "[E]ven the dullest of readers could sense that something new was happening. ... With each passing issue Steranko's efforts became more and more innovative. Entire pages would be devoted to photocollages of drawings [that] ignored panel boundaries and instead worked together on planes of depth. The first pages ... became incredible production numbers similar in design to the San Francisco rock concert poster of the period".

His peers took note of his experimentation. Writer-artist Larry Hama, in an introduction to Nick Fury collection, said Steranko "combined the figurative dynamism of Jack Kirby with modern design concepts", and recostumed Fury from suits and ties to "a form-fitting bodysuit with numerous zippers and pockets, like a Wally Wood spacesuit revamped by Pierre Cardin. The women were clad in form-fitting black leather a la Emma Peel in the Avengers TV show. The graphic influences of Peter Max, Op Art and Andy Warhol were embedded into the design of the pages – and the pages were designed as a whole, not just as a series of panels. All this, executed in a crisp, hard-edged style, seething with drama and anatomical tension."

Steranko introduced or popularized in comics such art movements of the day as psychedelia and op art, drawing specifically on the "aesthetic of [Salvador] Dalí," with inspiration from Richard M. Powers, ultimately synthesizing a style he termed "Zap Art." A.M. Viturtia notes Steranko drew on the James Bond novels, and claims that the influence went both ways: "Although Steranko was primarily influenced by spy movies, after Nick Fury came on the comics scene, the directors of those same movies began to borrow heavily from Steranko himself!" He absorbed, adapted and built upon the groundbreaking work of Jack Kirby, both in the use of photomontage (particularly for cityscapes), and in the use of full- and double-page-spreads. Indeed, in Strange Tales #167 (Jan. 1968), Steranko created comics' first four-page spread, upon which panorama he or editor Lee bombastically noted, "to get the full effect, of course, requires a second ish [copy of the issue] placed side-by-side, but we think you'll find it to be well worth the price to have the wildest action scene ever in the history of comics!" All the while, Steranko spun outlandishly action-filled plots of intrigue, barely sublimated sensuality, and a cool-jazz hi-fi hipness.

Writer Steven Ringgenberg assessed that

Steranko's Marvel work became a benchmark of '60s pop culture, combining the traditional comic book art styles of Wally Wood and Jack Kirby with the surrealism of Richard Powers and Salvador Dalí. Steeped in cinematic techniques picked up from that medium's masters, Jim synthesized ... an approach different from anything being done in mainstream comics, though it did include one standard attraction: lots of females in skintight, sexy costumes. Countess Valentina (Val) Allegro De Fontaine [sic; "Valentina Allegra di Fontaine"] made her debut in Strange Tales #159 (Aug. 1967) by flooring Nick Fury during a training session, proving that she could take care of herself! She looked like a character who had just stepped out of a James Bond poster.

Captain America #111 (March 1969): Steranko's signature surrealism. Inking by Joe Sinnott.

She and Steranko's other skintight leather-clad version of Bond girls pushed what was allowable under the Comics Code at the time. One example is a silent, one-page seduction sequence with the Countess in Nick Fury, Agent of S.H.I.E.L.D. #2, described by Robin Green in Rolling Stone:

So one panel had the stereo in Fury's apartment to show there was music playing, cigarettes in the ash tray in one, there was a sequence of intercut shots where she moved closer to him, much more intimately, there was a kiss, there was a rose, and then there was one panel with the telephone off the hook, which the comic book code [sic; "Comics Code"] made him put back on. ... [T]he last panel on that page had Nick and his old lady kneeling, with their arms around each other, and that was entirely too much for the Code, so the panel was replaced with a picture of a gun in its holster.

When reprinted in Nick Fury, Agent of S.H.I.E.L.D.: Who Is Scorpio? (Marvel Enterprises, 2001; ISBN 0-7851-0766-5), however, Steranko's original final panel was reinserted: In a black-and-white long shot with screentone shading, the couple is beginning to embrace, with Fury standing and the Countess on one knee, getting up. Another reprinting, in Marvel Masterworks: Nick Fury Agent of S.H.I.E.L.D. Volume 2 (Marvel Publishing, 2009; ISBN 978-0-7851-3503-6), used the published final panel, although the appendix included the original art, showing the page as initially drawn. Each instance uses Steranko's original telephone panel, not the redrawn published version.

Fury's adventures continued in his own series, for which Steranko contributed four 20-page stories: "Who is Scorpio?" (issue #1); "So Shall Ye Reap ... Death" (#2), inspired by Shakespeare's The Tempest; "Dark Moon Rise, Hell Hound Kill" (#3), a Hound of the Baskervilles homage, replete with a Peter Cushing manqué; and the spy-fi sequel "What Ever Happened to Scorpio?" (#5). Yet after deadline pressures forced a fill-in "origin" story by another team in issue #4, Steranko produced merely a handful of additional covers, then dropped the book. Decades afterward, however, their images are among comics' best known, and homages to his art have abounded – from updates of classic covers with different heroes in place of Fury, to recreations of famous pages and layouts.

Steranko also had short runs on X-Men (#50–51, Nov.–Dec. 1968), for which he designed a new cover logo, and Captain America (#110–111, 113, Feb.–March, May 1969). Steranko introduced the Madame Hydra character in his brief Captain America run. With no new work immediately forthcoming, a "Marvel Bullpen Bulletins" fan page in spring 1969 announced that, "In case you've been wondering what happened to Jaunty Jim Steranko, ... [he] is working on a brand-new feature, which will shortly be spotlighted in Marvel Super-Heroes. And talk about a secret – he hasn't even told us what it is!" The referred-to project never appeared.

Steranko went on to write and draw a horror story that precipitated a breakup with Marvel. Though that seven-page tale, "At the Stroke of Midnight", published in Tower of Shadows #1 (Sept. 1969), would win a 1969 Alley Award, editor Lee, who had already rejected Steranko's cover for that issue, clashed with Steranko over panel design, dialog, and the story title, initially "The Lurking Fear at Shadow House". According to Steranko at a 2006 panel and elsewhere, Lee disliked or did not understand the homage to horror author H. P. Lovecraft, and devised his own title for the story. After much conflict, Steranko either quit or was fired. Lee phoned him about a month later, after the two had cooled down.

In a contemporaneous interview, conducted November 14, 1969, Steranko reflected on the tiff:

The reason I had a little altercation with them is because they edited some of my work. They changed certain things that I didn't feel should be changed. And I insisted that we couldn't continue on that basis. ... For example, my horror story "At the Stroke of Midnight" had a line of dialogue added. The meek husband said, "I'm nervous because it's closer to midnight" or something like that; simply a gratuitous line. It wasn't my title and it didn't have that line in it. Stan originally wanted that story to be called "Let Them Eat Cake," which I didn't approve of. We had disagreements about the way I told stories. ... If you're a publisher and you want my work, you get it my way or you don't get it at all. ... Anyway, I have an agreement now, a working agreement with them, and everything's cool.

Summing up this initial stint in comics, Steranko said in 1979,

I was getting the top pay at Marvel, along with Kirby and John Buscema, and I felt privileged to be considered in their class. Both of them were better comic artists. But working at Marvel was also a serious cut in pay compared to my advertising work. My life was hectic then. I worked as the art director for an ad agency in the afternoon, played in a rock band at night, and worked on my comic book pages early in the morning. It's a peculiar thing, but the more I learned about storytelling, the slower I became. Eventually I had to stop playing in the band; later I left the agency. There were plenty of hassles with Stan Lee, of course. I felt that if I was good enough to work for them, then they should accept my work without a lot of maddening editorial changes. But now, I think I may have been wrong. After all, Marvel was paying the tab. Stan is a great editor. He stresses storytelling and really knows the comics business, probably better than anyone else.

Steranko returned briefly to Marvel, contributing a romance story ("My Heart Broke in Hollywood", Our Love Story #5, Feb. 1970) and becoming the cover artist for 15 comics beginning with Doc Savage #2–3, Shanna the She-Devil #1–2, and Supernatural Thrillers #1–2 (each successively cover-dated Dec. 1972 and Feb. 1973), and ending with the reprint comic Nick Fury and his Agents of S.H.I.E.L.D. #2 (April 1973).

=== Publisher and paperback artist ===
In 1973, Steranko became founding editor of Marvel's official fan magazine, FOOM, which superseded the two previous official fan clubs, the Merry Marvel Marching Society and Marvelmania. Steranko served as editor and also produced the covers for the magazine's inaugural four issues before being succeeded editorially by Tony Isabella. He had previously been associated with Marvelmania, producing two of the club's 12 posters.

Steranko then branched into other areas of publishing, including most notably book-cover illustration. Lacking any experience as a painter, his decision to effectively quit comics in 1969 led him to "an artist friend who earned his living as a painter", from whom Steranko obtained an "hour-long lecture", and the suggestion that he work in acrylics rather than oils, for the sake of speed. From these inauspicious beginnings, he compiled a portfolio of half a dozen paintings ("two Westerns, two pin-up girls, two gothic horror and one sword-and-sorcery") and met with Lancer Books' art director Howard Winters, to whom he immediately sold his fantasy piece. This led to a career illustrating dozens of paperback covers, popularly including those of Pyramid Books' reissues of the 1930s pulp novels of The Shadow. When DC Comics gained the comic book publishing rights to The Shadow, they contacted Steranko to work on the new series but ultimately chose Dennis O'Neil and Michael Kaluta to produce the title instead.

Steranko also formed his own publishing company, Supergraphics, in 1969, and the following year worked with writer-entrepreneur Byron Preiss on an anti-drug comic book, The Block, distributed to elementary schools nationwide. In 1970 and 1972, Supergraphics published two tabloid-sized volumes entitled The Steranko History of Comics, a planned six-volume history of the American comics industry, though no subsequent volumes have appeared. Written by Steranko, with hundreds of black-and-white cover reproductions as well as a complete reprint of one The Spirit story by Will Eisner, it included some of the first and in some cases only interviews with numerous creators from the 1930s and 1940s Golden Age of Comic Books.

Supergraphics projects included the proposed Talon the Timeless, illustrations of which appeared in a portfolio published in witzend magazine #5, and a pinup girl calendar, "The Supergirls", consisting of 12 illustrations of sexy superheroines in costumes recalling such superheroes as Captain America and Green Lantern. Through Supergraphics he also published the magazine Comixscene, which premiered with a December 1972 cover date as a folded-tabloid periodical on stiff, non-glossy paper, reporting on the comics field. It evolved in stages into Mediascene (beginning with issue #7, Dec. 1973) and ultimately into Prevue (beginning with #41, Aug. 1980), a general-interest, standard format, popular culture magazine, running through 1994. Fantagraphics publisher Gary Groth recounts his time living with and working for Sterkano and Prevue in Reading, PA during a Cartoonist Kayfabe YouTube interview in May 2020.

Steranko wrote, drew, and produced the illustrated novel Chandler: Red Tide in 1976, for Byron Preiss Visual Publications / Pyramid Books. Aside from occasional covers and pinup illustrations, he has rarely worked in comics since, although he did illustrate a serialized comics adaptation of the Peter Hyams 1981 sci-fi thriller Outland for Heavy Metal magazine. His only major work for DC Comics appeared in Superman #400 (Oct. 1984), the 10-page story "The Exile at the Edge of Eternity," which he wrote, drew, colored and lettered. A 1997 attempt to negotiate Steranko's return to S.H.I.E.L.D. did not bear fruit. In 2008, he worked with Radical Comics, doing covers, character and logo designs for its Hercules: The Thracian Wars title and Ryder on the Storm. In 2012, he did poster art for RZG Comics and a variant cover for DC's Before Watchmen: Rorschach #1. Steranko drew the 1970s variant cover for Action Comics #1000 (June 2018) and the 1960s variant cover for Detective Comics #1000 (May 2019).

=== Film and television work ===
For the film industry, Steranko has done sketches and preliminary paintings for movie posters, including for the 1977 Sinbad and the Eye of the Tiger and was a conceptual artist on Steven Spielberg's Raiders of the Lost Ark (1981), doing production designs for the film and designing the character of Indiana Jones. He also served in a similar capacity as "project conceptualist" on Francis Ford Coppola's Bram Stoker's Dracula (1992), and wrote the episode "The Ties That Bind" of the DC Comics animated TV series Justice League Unlimited (2004-2006).

In 2003, Steranko was interviewed by the History Channel for the documentary titled Comic Book Superheroes Unmasked.

He has "amassed an enormous portfolio of more than sixty projects (which he called the 'Theater of Concepts') designed to be seen in multimedia form".

=== Philanthropy ===
In a joint venture with Marvel Comics and Diamond Comic Distributors, Vanguard Productions in 2002 sponsored Steranko's "The Spirit of America" benefit print, created to fund an art scholarship "for victims of anti-American terrorism".

== Awards and recognition ==
Steranko has won awards in fields as varied as magic, comics and graphic design. A partial list includes:

- In addition to himself being inducted into the Will Eisner Comic Book Hall of Fame in 2006, Steranko's series Nick Fury, Agent of S.H.I.E.L.D. was inducted into comic fandom's Alley Award Hall of Fame in 1969.
- Steranko won three 1968 Alley Awards, for Best Pencil Artist, Best Feature Story ("Today Earth Died", Strange Tales #168; first page depicted above), and Best Cover (Nick Fury, Agent of S.H.I.E.L.D. #6).
- The following year, he won 1969 Alley Awards for Best Feature Story ("At the Stroke of Midnight", Tower of Shadows #1) and Best Cover (Captain America #113).
- 1970 Shazam Award: Outstanding Achievement by an Individual: Jim Steranko (for The Steranko History of Comics)
- 1975 Inkpot Award
- 2003 Dragon Con's Julie Award
- 2015 Harvey Award for Best Domestic Reprint Project for Nick Fury, Agent of S.H.I.E.L.D. Artist's Edition
- 2016 Steranko made a special appearance to honor the 2016 Inkwell Awards Ceremony at HeroesCon.

== Exhibitions ==
Steranko's work has been exhibited internationally in more than 160 shows. Among others, his work has been shown in the following locations:

- The Louvre Museum, Paris, France (1967)
- The Winnipeg Art Gallery, Winnipeg, Manitoba, Canada (1978)
- The Sydney Opera House, New South Wales, Australia (January 1986)
- The Butler Institute of American Art, Youngstown, Ohio (2022)

== Screenwriting ==
=== Television ===
- Justice League Unlimited (2005)
