= Captain 3-D =

Harvey Comics superhero

- The cover to Captain 3-D #1 (1953), by Joe Simon, Jack Kirby, Mort Meskin.

Publication information
- Publisher: Harvey Comics
- First appearance: Captain 3-D #1 (cover-dated December 1953)
- Created by: Joe Simon (writer, artist, inks); Jack Kirby (artist)

In-story information
- Notable aliases: The Chosen One
- Abilities: Superior physical attributes and intelligence

Captain 3-D is a superhero appearing in comic books published by Harvey Comics. Created by Joe Simon and Jack Kirby, the character marked an early attempt to produce a 3-D comic book.

== Publication history ==
Created by the writing and art team of Joe Simon and Jack Kirby, Captain 3-D starred in one issue of an eponymous Harvey Comics title, cover-dated December 1953. A second issue was partially completed, but the fad for 3-D was waning even as Captain 3-D first appeared. This issue also features inking by Steve Ditko, in his first published superhero work.

== Fictional character biography ==
Around fifty thousand years ago, a battle between two opposing civilizations takes place, one society populated by humanoids, the other a race of Cat People. The Cat People succeed in all but wiping out the humanoids, with only a tiny number of survivors hanging on in underground bases.

A humanoid scientist, Professor Five, devises a way that one of his people might survive to oppose the Cat People in the future. The Chosen One will be kept in a sort of "two-dimensional half life" in a specially prepared book, the Book of D, able to be released for brief periods of time by someone wearing a special pair of glasses.

Professor Five entrusts the book to a group of primitive men, who promise to guard it. Shortly afterwards the Cat People kill Professor Five and the other remaining humanoids, leaving the Chosen One the last survivor of his race. However the Cat People are all but destroyed themselves when their continent sinks beneath the ocean.

The handful of Cat People survivors are forced to hide in disguise among mankind, although they never give up their dreams of conquest. Knowing that in their weakened state the Chosen One might be able to lead humanity against them, they hunt for the Book of D, but every time they manage to catch up with the Book's guardian and kill him, someone else spirits the Book away to safety and becomes its new guardian.

In the early 1950s a strange, badly injured man stumbles into a book shop that has been inherited by teenager Danny Davis. Probably feeling the best place to hide a book would be in a shop full of them, he hands Danny the Book of D and begs him, "Keep this one. Never sell it". Seconds later he is killed by one of the disguised Cat People. Danny disarms the killer, who flees.

Examining the book afterward, Danny finds a pair of strange glasses inside it. The only other thing inside the book is an illustration of a strangely dressed man. Looking at the picture through the glasses, Danny is astounded when the man springs to life off the page. His arrival is timely as it coincides with the appearance of more gunmen, who identify the man from the book as Captain 3-D.

In spite of being outnumbered, Captain 3-D easily subdues the attackers, then has Danny examine them through the same strange glasses that brought him to life. Danny sees that the "gunmen" are Cat People. The Chosen One, who has become known over the years as Captain 3-D, tells Danny that he is the new guardian of the Book of D. Danny realizes this means he is now a target, but Captain 3-D reassures him that he will not be alone. With that, he returns to his sleep in the Book of D.

== Powers and abilities ==
The last survivor of an otherwise extinct humanoid race, Captain 3-D is gifted with superior intellect and physical attributes. He is fitter, stronger and faster than normal humans, to a level unspecified in his one brief appearance. Able to survive for millennia stored within the Book of D, Captain 3-D can only be released by the special glasses developed and built by Professor Five.

== See also ==
- 3-D Man, a Marvel hero inspired by the character
