= Captain Freedom =

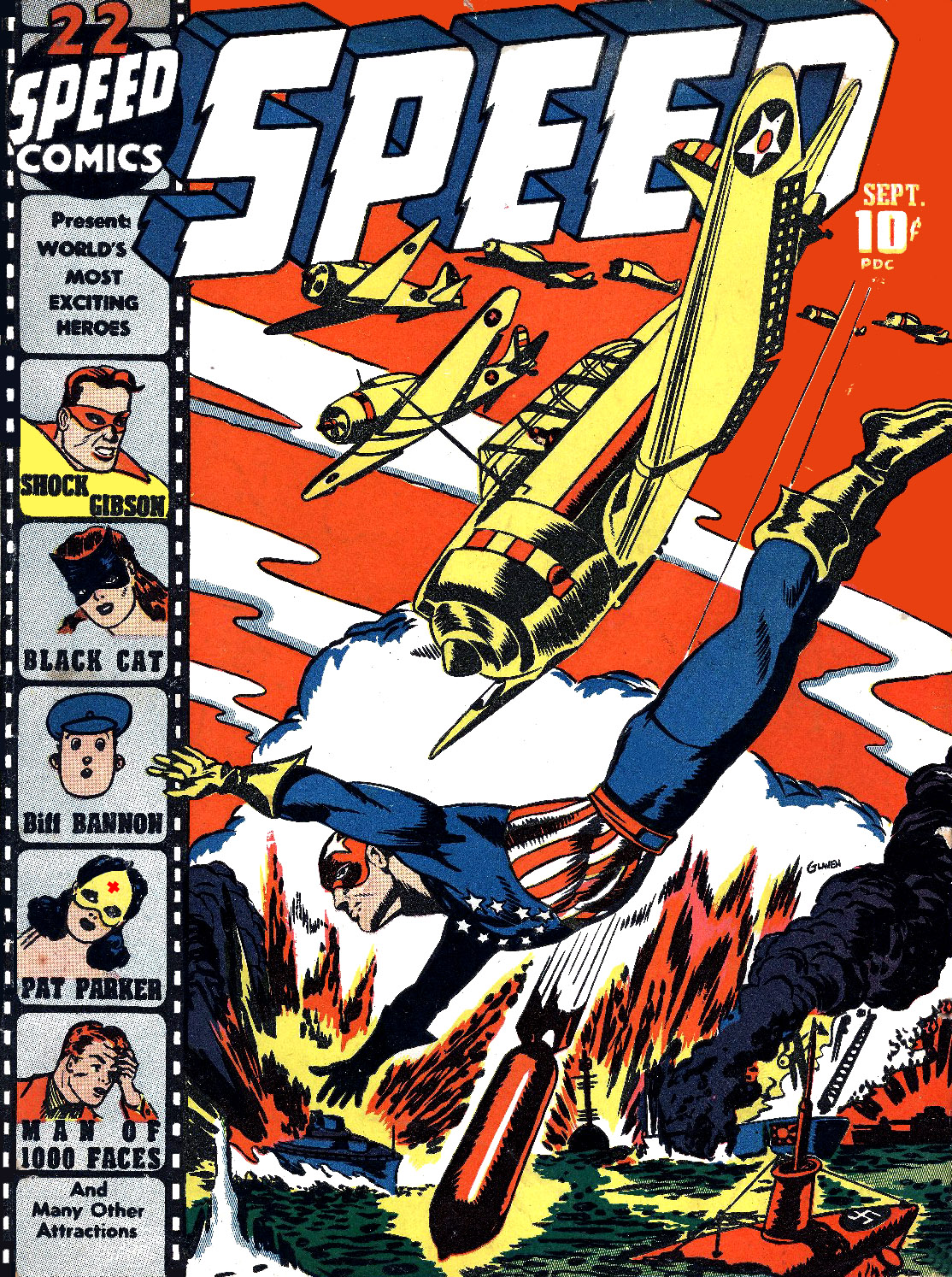
- Captain Freedom on the cover of Speed Comics #22 (September 1942).

Publication information
- Publisher: Harvey Comics
- First appearance: Speed Comics #13 (1941)
- Created by: "Franklin Flagg"

In-story information
- Alter ego: Don Wright
- Species: Human
- Team affiliations: Young Defenders (Harvey Comics); Liberty Corps (AC Comics)
- Abilities: None (Harvey Comics); strength of will and intense physical and mental training (AC Comics)

Captain Freedom is a superhero from the period known as "Golden Age of Comic Books". His creator was identified as "Franklin Flagg" in the credits, but the identity of the individual behind the pseudonym remains unknown. He first appeared in Speed Comics #13 (May 1941), a Harvey Comics title. He continued to appear in Speed Comics until its cancellation in #44 (Jan 1947).

The character was revived by AC Comics as a member of the Liberty Corp. Cloned from the DNA of a famous scientist, with incredible will-power and physical and mental training, as many as a hundred of the clones, were dispatched to various countries all over the world (each identified as Captain Freedom), serving as a symbol and to fight for freedom. One of the Captains shown in the AC universe went by the name Kent Clarkson. He later joined the Captain Paragon's original Sentinels of Liberty during "The Armageddon Factor" storyline.

== Fictional character biography ==
Captain Freedom was Don Wright, a newspaper publisher who adopted a costumed identity to fight agents of the Axis. He was assisted by Young Defenders, four kids who worked for him as deliverymen.

According to Jess Nevins' Encyclopedia of Golden Age Superheroes, "he fights ordinary criminals, saboteurs, German and Japanese spies, Yellow Peril mad scientists like Chang Ku (and his zombies), and the Black Dragon Society".
