= Jigsaw (Harvey Comics) =

- Cover of Jigsaw #1

Publication information
- Publisher: Harvey Comics
- First appearance: Jigsaw #1 (September 1966)
- Created by: Joe Simon

In-story information
- Notable aliases: Man of a Thousand Parts
- Abilities: Disconnecting and extending body parts; enhanced strength.

Jigsaw is a Joe Simon-created character and two-issue comic series published by Harvey Comics from September to December 1966.

Developed for Harvey's short-lived superhero line, Harvey Thriller, Jigsaw was the disconnectable "Man of a Thousand Parts". The feature was drawn by Tony Tallarico, with the writing generally, if unconfirmably, credited to Otto Binder. The backup features were "Super Luck" in issue #1 (artist unknown) and "The Man From SRAM" (art by Golden Age veteran Carl Pfeufer) in #2. The first issue also featured an anthological science fiction story drawn by EC Comics great Reed Crandall. Work for a third issue may exist.

The story involves astronaut Gary Jason, who was accidentally killed and then put back together by aliens, who turn him into a living jigsaw puzzle and inform him that he will be their "space agent". In his new form, Jigsaw can stretch his body parts, similar to the popular Quality Comics character Plastic Man.

The unsuccessful Harvey Thriller line ended abruptly with the March 1967 issues, leaving Jigsaw with only two issues. House ads showed the cover to issue #3, but the issue was never published.
