= The Steranko History of Comics =

History series by Jim Steranko

- Vol. 1 cover
- Author: Jim Steranko
- Language: English
- Subject: American comics history
- Publisher: Supergraphics
- Publication date: 1970–1972
- Publication place: United States
- Media type: Print
- Awards: Shazam Award

The Steranko History of Comics is a multi-volume history of American comic books written by cartoonist and comics historian Jim Steranko. Originally planned as a six-volume series, only two volumes were ever produced, which were respectively published in 1970 and 1972 by Steranko's publishing imprint Supergraphics. Combining elements of art history, oral history, and personal anecdote, the series is sourced from firsthand interactions with multiple influential figures in early comics, notably Jerry Siegel, Joe Shuster, Bob Kane, Bill Finger, Will Eisner, and Jack Kirby. The Steranko History of Comics has been described as the first piece of cultural analysis on American comic books, and was awarded the Shazam Award for Outstanding Achievement by an Individual in 1970.

== Content ==
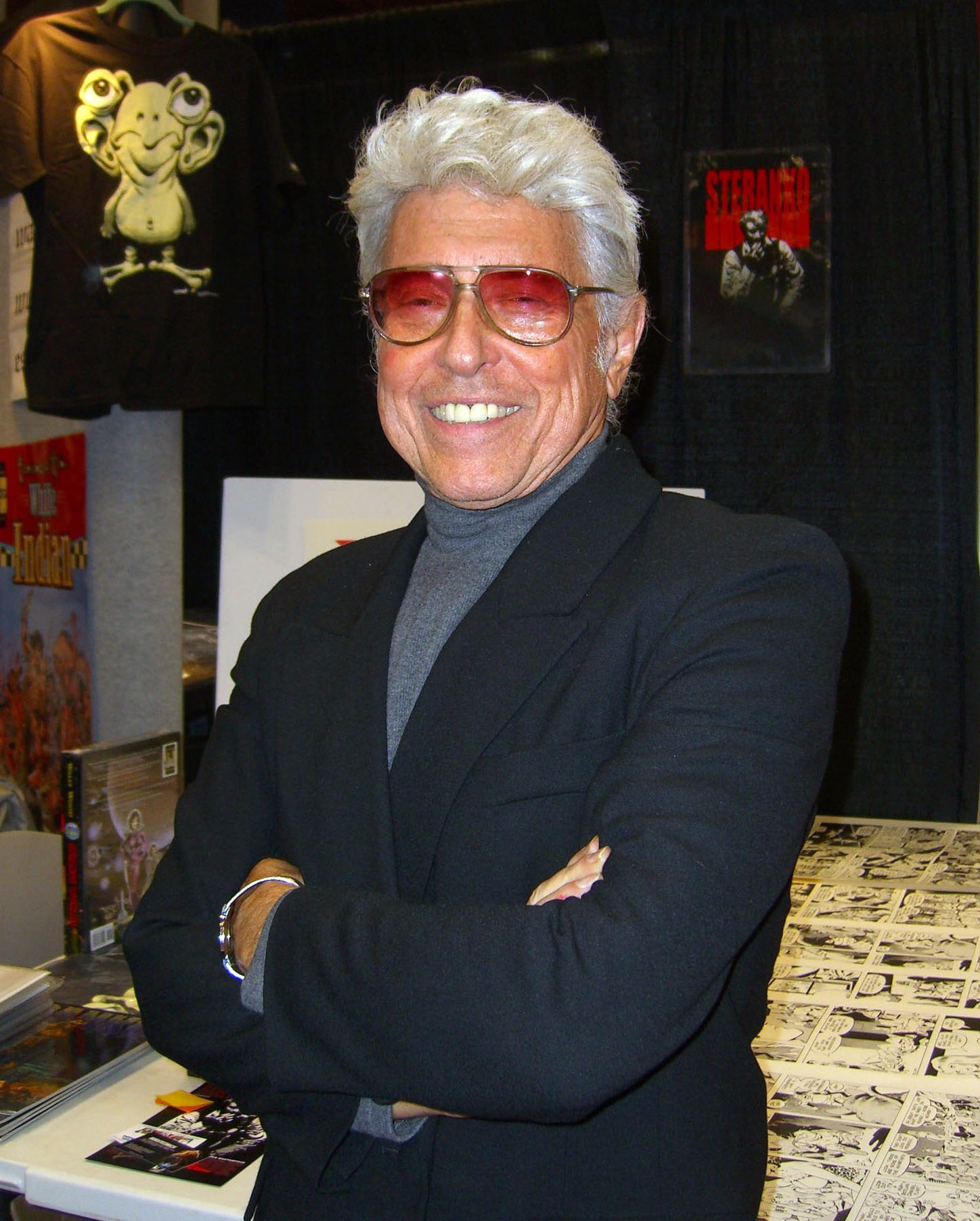
Author Jim Steranko in 2012

The Steranko History of Comics is a long-form essay on the history of American comics written by Jim Steranko. Steranko was already an established comic book artist when he wrote The Steranko History of Comics and was able to gain direct access to multiple influential figures in the industry, including Jerry Siegel, Joe Shuster, Bob Kane, Bill Finger, Will Eisner, and Jack Kirby. Steranko combines elements of art history and oral history, as well as his own anecdotes and analysis. The Steranko History of Comics is illustrated by reproductions of comic book covers, archived and unpublished comic book art, and original art produced specifically for the series, notably an original The Spirit comic.

The first volume details the history of newspaper comic strips; pre-superhero pulp magazine comics such as The Shadow and Doc Savage; Superman and his creators Siegel and Shuster; Captain America and the publications of Marvel Comics forerunner Timely Comics; and the characters of DC Comics forerunner All-American Comics, including The Flash, Green Lantern, and Wonder Woman. The second volume details the history of Captain Marvel and the publications of Fawcett Comics; war comics; Plastic Man and the publications of Quality Comics; and The Spirit and the publications of Feature Comics. The foreword to the series is written by Italian filmmaker Federico Fellini.

== Publication and release ==
The Steranko History of Comics was one of several works published from the mid-1960s to early 1970s on the history of comics, science fiction, pulp fiction, and other adjacent mediums that were produced in recognition of the largely uncodified history of those mediums; notable examples include Seekers of Tomorrow (1965) by Sam Moskowitz, Great Comic Book Heroes (1965) by Jules Feiffer, and All In Color for a Dime (1970) by Richard A. Lupoff and Don Thompson.

Volumes one and two The Steranko History of Comics were published by Supergraphics, Steranko's own publishing imprint, in 1970 and 1972, respectively. Though originally planned as a six-volume series, only two volumes were ever produced. Both volumes were published as oversized tabloid style magazines with saddle-stitched binding.

== Reception and influence ==
"Using images to make points of connection rather than dry academic quotes, Steranko, without any formal training in history, in many ways began the study of cultural historicism in comics by making his process plain. His method of understanding comics history—by hunting for cultural forebears, swipes, artifacts, and stories—is still very much in practice today."

— Brad Ricca

At the 1970 Shazam Awards, Steranko was awarded Outstanding Achievement by an Individual for the first volume of The Steranko History of Comics.

Comics historian Brad Ricca notes that while The Steranko History of Comics is "frustratingly uncited" and did not undergo peer review, it nevertheless represents a landmark piece of comics history: it was "the first wholesale cultural analysis" of American comic books, making "real cross-cultural connections between comics and other mediums", particularly pulp fiction; further, it was the first published account of American comic book history to examine the medium in the context of comic book creators rather than comic book characters. Ricca further notes the significance of The Steranko History of Comics as a series marketed and sold specifically to comic book readers, communicating to this audience "that it was important to know their history".
