= Black Cat (Harvey Comics) =

Harvey comic book character

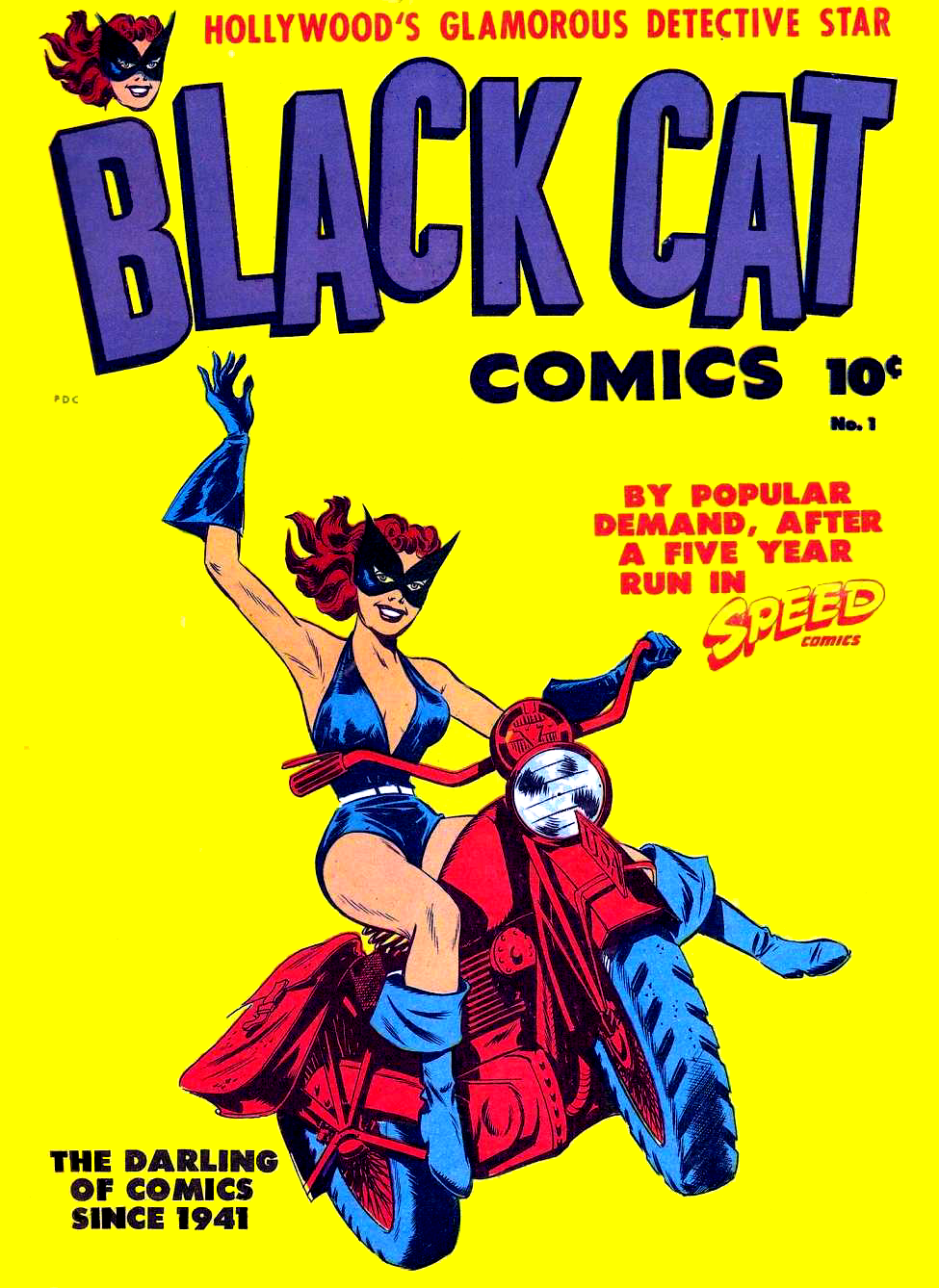
- Black Cat Comics #1 (1946)

Publication information
- Publisher: Harvey Comics (1941–1951)
- First appearance: Pocket Comics #1 (August 1941)
- Created by: Al Gabriele

In-story information
- Alter ego: Linda Turner
- Partnerships: Black Kitten (Kit Weston)
- Abilities: Adept horse/motorcycle rider Skilled martial artist Great leaping Use of lasso and rope
Black Cat Comics
Publication information
- Publisher: Harvey Comics
- Schedule: Bi-monthly
- Format: Ongoing series
- Genre: Superhero, Horror
- Publication date: June/July 1946 – April 1963
- No. of issues: 65
- Main character: Black Cat
Creative team
- Written by: Bob Haney
- Artist(s): Al Gabriele, Pierce Rice, Arturo Caseneuve, Bob Powell, Jill Elgin, Barbara Fiske Calhoun, Joe Kubert
- Penciller: Lee Elias
- Inker: John Belfi

Black Cat is a comic book adventure heroine published by Harvey Comics from 1941 to 1951. Harvey also published reprints of the character in both the mid-1950s and the early 1960s. The character's creation is claimed by the Harvey family to have originated with publisher Alfred Harvey, but there is no corroborating evidence for this. The Black Cat debuted in Pocket Comics #1 (August 1941).

== Publication history ==
The Black Cat debuted in Pocket Comics #1 (August 1941), an experimental digest-sized comic book published by Harvey and was illustrated by artist Al Gabriele.

After the demise of Pocket Comics, the Black Cat became one of the features in the anthology Speed Comics, lasting until that title's demise in 1947. By 1946, Black Cat had also gained her own title, which published 29 issues until 1951 before changing its content to horror stories (the title was subsequently known as Black Cat Western Comics, Black Cat Mystery Comics, Black Cat Western Mystery, Black Cat Western Comics, and Black Cat Mystic, before reverting to Black Cat for the final three issues, #63–65).

Black Cat also appeared in a separate Harvey anthology, All-New Comics, in issues #6, 9, and 15. Writers on the Black Cat series are not positively known. Artists who worked on the feature after Al Gabriele include Pierce Rice, Arturo Caseneuve, Bob Powell, Jill Elgin and Joe Kubert. Lee Elias, occasionally inked by John Belfi, provided the art from 1946 until the feature's end in 1951.

== Fictional biography ==
Linda Turner is the daughter of silent film Western actor Tim Turner, and a former Hollywood stunt woman. Linda has successfully made the transition from stunt woman to lead actress. During the filming of an unnamed picture, Linda suspects the film's director, Garboil (no first name given), of being a Nazi spy or at the very least an American Bund member. In order to follow him and gain corroborating evidence, she disguises herself in a backless blue blouse, red shorts, blue flared gloves, red buccaneer boots and a blue opera mask and calls herself the Black Cat.

While following Garboil, Black Cat meets Rick Horne, a reporter for the Los Angeles Globe who has been assigned to investigate rumors of a Nazi spy ring in LA. Initially disdainful of each other, the pair are forced to work together and discover that Garboil is planting secret information in his motion pictures. Using her knowledge of the studio, Black Cat sneaks into the editing room and changes the edit of the picture to render the information useless. When they are discovered, Rick and Cat physically overpower the gang and turn them in. Garboil escapes and Linda decides to maintain her Black Cat identity in order to keep watch over his activities.

According to Jess Nevins' Encyclopedia of Golden Age Superheroes, most of the Black Cat's opponents are ordinary criminals and Axis agents, but she does fight a female mad scientist, the criminal brothers known as the Three Black Cats, a vampire, and after the war Russians in Afghanistan.

In 1944, The Black Cat's costume was modified slightly, becoming a one piece blue bathing suit with buccaneer boots, flared gloves and opera mask, all in blue, and a red belt. This look would remain for the rest of her career.

== Cast of characters ==
=== Linda Turner ===
Linda Turner gained access to movies with bit parts in her parents' films as a child. Her father was silent film western actor Tim Turner and her unnamed mother was a stunt woman, having appeared at least once in a jungle girl picture or serial, probably in the early thirties. By her late teens, Linda became a professional stunt woman and won some acclaim for her work. Her natural beauty gained her a screen test and her innate acting ability led to acting jobs, eventually to starring roles. Her acting roles have ranged from period dramas and romantic melodramas to action heroines, where her history as a stunt woman allows her to do some of her own stunts. That same history as a stunt woman, plus life on her father's ranch outside of Los Angeles, gave Linda the physical skills to perform her work as The Black Cat. Linda is adept at riding a horse and a motorcycle, as well as performing stunts on the vehicle. She is proficient with a lasso and rope, and possesses a black belt in judo. Her stunt training also allows her to make impressive leaps from buildings or moving vehicles safely.

=== Rick Horne ===
Rick Horne is a reporter and love interest of Linda Turner. Initially Horne is employed as a reporter for the Los Angeles Globe. In later appearances, he works for a Hollywood trade paper as a columnist. Near the end of the series, Horne also had a radio broadcast, in much the same manner of Walter Winchell, where he broadcast news and entertainment interviews. Horne is aggressive and seemingly fearless, often using his fists to escape hazardous situations or to subdue criminals. Though his fighting prowess is surpassed by The Black Cat, he is often a help to her. Horne was mistrustful of Black Cat at first and denigrated her efforts to bring Garboil to justice. However, as they worked together more and more, Horne was impressed with Black Cat's ability and began to view her as an efficient force against crime and an attractive fantasy woman.

At the same time, Horne struck up a casual friendship with Linda Turner without realizing she is also The Black Cat. Their relationship grew over the years, to the point where the two began to date and maintained a tenuous commitment to each other. But Horne is more attracted to the mysterious fantasy of The Black Cat than to the glamorous Linda Turner, and Linda seems determined to keep the reporter at arm's length until he commits to her rather than his fantasy woman, even though both are the same woman.

=== Toby ===
Toby is Linda Turner's pet cat. Toby was usually portrayed as a black Siamese. Toby was usually depicted as a male, though one story identified the cat as female. It is possible that Linda had two cats, both named Toby, at different stages of her life. In Toby's initial appearances, the cat displayed an antagonistic dislike for Garboil, Linda's director on her films. In at least one story Toby was drawn by artist Bob Powell as a white Angora. After changing to Black Cat, Linda worked a skin tight black cat skin over the white cat and, in disguise, Toby assisted Black Cat in tracking down the villain of the story.

=== Garboil ===
Garboil is the studio contract director Linda initially works with. He is of German descent and speaks with a thick German accent. Linda initially suspects him of being a spy because, as the narration explains in her origin story in Pocket Comics #1, of "the propaganda in her new script", and her suspicions are proven to be well-founded. He is cold and superior in his dealings with others, and has a disdain for Linda's cat. Garboil was the only recurring villain in Black Cat's history. The character disappeared after a few appearances.

=== Tim Turner ===
Linda's father is introduced in 1946, after Black Cat gains her own title. A former cowboy who gained stardom as a western hero during the silent movie days, Tim Turner retired from films sometime after the death of his stunt woman wife, Linda's mother. The elderly Turner lives primarily on his own on a ranch outside of Los Angeles. He has an affectionate relationship with his daughter, who he knows is The Black Cat, and occasionally advises her on her cases. It was Turner who taught his daughter how to ride and rope, skills she later translated into her stunt work. Though he is concerned for his daughter's safety, Tim Turner wholly approves of her activities as The Black Cat and her desire to bring justice to the world. Turner also dabbled after his film career as a private detective, but it's unknown whether he was successful at it. He did teach some of his investigative skills to his daughter.

=== Jonesie ===
Jonesie is Linda Turner's personal secretary. The slim blonde with the large black horn-rimmed glasses handles Linda's fan-mail and schedule, acts as a liaison with the studio Linda is contracted to and occasionally is a sympathetic ear to Linda when she pondered her curious relationship with Rick Horne.

=== Kit Weston ===
Kit Weston was introduced in Black Cat #28. The thirteen-year-old boy was a circus aerialist, part of the act The Flying Westons. During a performance, the tent is engulfed in flames by the super-criminal The Fire Bug. The Black Cat saves Kit when he's trapped by the fire on a trapeze platform, but Kit's parents are killed in the blaze. Linda Turner volunteers shelter to the orphan until relatives can be found. Later, in order to cheer the despondent youth, Linda appears to him as Black Cat and takes him with her as she trails The Fire Bug. Black Cat corners the villain at the municipal museum and, with Kit's aid, defeats him. The Fire Bug is revealed to be Orson Arson, a former special effects wizard at Century Studio.

While Linda and Tim debated what to do with Kit, the boy managed through a combination of youthful bravado and his aerialist skills to foil a burglar he caught in the Turner home. Impressed by his skill and energy, Linda takes him into her confidence and reveals her second identity to him. Kit is given a blue unitard with red trunks and a blue cowl with cat's ears, and assists Black Cat in her last two adventures as "Black Kitten".

== Reception ==
Black Cat was ranked 41st in Comics Buyer's Guide's "100 Sexiest Women in Comics" list.
