= Spyman =

Comic book superhero

- Spyman #1 (Sept. 1966), cover art by Joe Simon George Tuska (main image) & Jim Steranko (inset).

Publication information
- Publisher: Harvey Comics
- Publication date: Sept. 1966 - Feb. 1967
- No. of issues: 3

Creative team
- Written by: Joe Simon
- Artist(s): Joe Simon; Jim Steranko; Dick AyersGeorge Tuska

Spyman is a fictional character, a short-lived comic book superhero published by Harvey Comics' Harvey Thriller imprint in the mid-1960s. He starred in three issues of his own comic, cover-dated September 1966 to February 1967.

Spyman #1 contained the first professional comic book works by Jim Steranko. Steranko created the concept and plotted the first story, but he did not supply any artwork, except the first page splash which includes a diagram of his robot hand. This was one of three concepts Steranko created for Harvey that saw print.

Spyman was secret agent Johnny Chance, who lost his left hand defusing a nuclear bomb. Johnny was an agent of the American spy group LIBERTY, headquartered under the Statue of Liberty. After losing his hand, he would be outfitted with an 'Electro Robot Hand', each finger a different tool/weapon. He would soon be outfitted with a belt with extra fingers with additional uses.

Chance and LIBERTY fought against MIRAGE (Empire of Guerrilla Assassination, Revenge, and International Menace), led by the Whisperer, who was killed in the first issue, and Chance would go on to fight Cyclops and the Evil Eye Society in the second issue and the Id Machine in the third.

It is unknown who wrote the stories, but it may have been editor Joe Simon. Pencil art was by George Tuska with inking by Dick Ayers, with some inks by Reed Crandall, in the first issue. Ayers inked the second issue, then Bill Draut the third.
