= Harvey Comics =

American comic book publisher

- Logo used as of 1994
- Formerly: Harvey Publications
- Industry: Comic books
- Predecessor: Brookwood Publications
- Founded: 1939; 87 years ago (as Worth Carnahan Comics); 1940; 86 years ago (as Greenwald Publications); 1941; 85 years ago (as Harvey Publications)
- Founder: Alfred Harvey
- Defunct: 2002; 24 years ago
- Fate: Folded Into The Harvey Entertainment Company
- Successor: The Harvey Entertainment Company
- Headquarters: New York City, New York, U.S.
- Parent: DreamWorks Classics (NBCUniversal)

Harvey Comics (also known as Worth Carnahan Comics, Greenwald Publications, Harvey World Famous Comics, Harvey Publications, Harvey Comics Entertainment, Harvey Hits, Harvey Illustrated Humor, and Harvey Picture Magazines) was an American comic book publisher, founded in New York City, originally by Worth Carnahan in 1939, then handed over to editor Leo Greenwald in 1940, and finally by Alfred Harvey in 1941, after buying out Worth Carnahan's comics group and the small publisher Brookwood Publications. His brothers, Robert B. and Leon Harvey, joined shortly after. Though the company was founded to publish original comics, by the 1950s, it was focused on licensed content, largely from cartoons produced by Paramount Pictures' Famous Studios. The artist Warren Kremer was closely associated with the publisher.

Harvey Comics' most notable characters are mostly former Famous Studios properties, such as Casper the Friendly Ghost, in addition to original characters like Richie Rich. Harvey's mascot is named Joker, a harlequin jack-in-the-box character and mascot of the cartoon shorts series Noveltoons. He also appeared as a cameo in the ending scene of the film Who Framed Roger Rabbit, alongside many other famous cartoon characters.

== History ==
=== Origins ===
The origins of Harvey Comics itself was dated back to 1939 in New York City, when Worth Carnahan begin publishing comics with its distribution handled by Publishers Distributing Corporation and Leo Greenwald, who worked for Publishers Distributing Corporation as editor and co-owner.

Three titles came out were the anthology superhero titles Champion Comics (later shortened to Champ Comics), Cyclone Comics and O.K. Comics. Carnahan, besides publishing its bestseller Champion Comics through Worth Publishing, was also a partner with Charles Quinlan, later of Holyoke Publishing, in the group Hit Publications to publish O.K. Comics, and also both Carnahan and Quinlan partnered with Bilbara Publishing Co. Inc., an independent company led by William M. Cotton, to publish Cyclone Comics.

Greenwald then took control of the Worth Carnahan comic book group, naming it Greenwald Publications, and later took over its faltering title Speed Comics in 1940 from Brookwood Publications, a company owned by Frank Z. Temerson and Isaac W. Ullman, and Greenwald took control of the comic book organization, having published two anthology titles Speed Comics and Champ Comics.

=== Establishment of Harvey Comics ===
Greenwald then recruited the Harvey brothers Alfred, Leon and Robert, as Harvey had just departed Fox Features Syndicate, in 1941, and then took control of the organization passing over from Greenwald. In 1941, the Greenwald group, who at that time, published only two titles, was transformed into Harvey Publications. Their early headliners were Shock Gibson and Captain Freedom, a patriotic hero similar to The Shield. Harvey then jumped into the digest sized market with another anthology title Pocket Comics, which was merged with the larger Speed Comics in 1942. Only one of their early titles find longevity: The Black Cat, a Hollywood starlet-superhero, which was published into the 1950s.

Harvey began a shift to licensed characters in 1942 when it took over the license to the radio hit Green Hornet from Holyoke, which has published six comics issues. Harvey added additional titles, most licensed, including Joe Palooka, Blondie, Dick Tracy, and other newspaper strip characters. The company gradually shifted away from superheroes, to other genres, like the horror genre in the late 1940s and 1950s.

=== Shift to children's comics ===
The company is best known for characters it published in comics from 1950s onward, particularly ones developed by the animation company Famous Studios which Harvey licensed starting in 1951, moving over from St. John Publications. These include Little Audrey, Casper the Friendly Ghost, Baby Huey, and Herman and Katnip. The company then gradually shifted away from its focus on horror and superhero titles to focus mostly on children's comics such as the Paramount-licensed characters after the Comics Code Authority took effect.

In July 1958, Harvey purchased the cartoon properties of Famous Studios (October 1950–December 1959), including character rights and rights to the cartoon shorts but excluding the Popeye cartoons. The Famous cartoons were repackaged and distributed to television as Harveytoons, and Harvey continued production on new comics and a handful of new cartoons produced for television. Casper the Friendly Ghost, who had been Famous' most popular original character, now became Harvey's top draw. Associated characters such as Spooky the Tuff Little Ghost, The Ghostly Trio, Casper's horse Nightmare, Hot Stuff the Little Devil, and Wendy the Good Little Witch were added to the Harvey line. In 1963, when Paramount entered into a $78,000 agreement with Harvey to produce The New Casper Cartoon Show, they also sold their pre-April 1962 library of cartoons to Harvey for $1.

Harvey also licensed popular characters from newspaper comic strips, such as Mutt and Jeff and Sad Sack. In addition, Harvey developed such original properties as Richie Rich, Little Dot and Little Lotta. While the company tried to diversify the comics it published, with brief forays in the 1950s and 1960s into superhero, suspense, horror, western and other forms in such imprints as Harvey Thriller and Thrill Adventure, teen titles as Harvey Teen (known for Bunny and Fruitman), and romance comics under the True Love Series imprint, children's comics were the bulk of its output.

=== 1980s decline and sale ===
By the early 1980s, Marvel Comics was in negotiations with Harvey Comics to assume publication of some of their characters. Harvey editor Sid Jacobson, along with the other Harvey staff, were interviewed by Mike Hobson, Marvel's group vice-president of publishing (de facto publisher). As part of the process, Jacobson created several new characters which were well received by Hobson and effectively sealed the deal. Marvel Editor-in-Chief Jim Shooter appointed editor Tom DeFalco as executive editor to coordinate with the Harvey staff, who were hired by Marvel. On the day Marvel was set to take over the Harvey publications, Harvey Comics pulled out of the deal due to an internal disagreement among the two remaining Harvey brothers, Alfred and Leon. Harvey would cease publishing its comics in 1982.

In summer 1984, Steve Geppi (owner of Diamond Comic Distributors and Geppi's Comic World) paid $50,000 for, among other properties, Harvey's entire archive of original art from the Harvey comic Sad Sack. Geppi made this agreement with Steve Harvey, who at the time was president of Harvey Publications Inc., as well as president of Sad Sack Inc., a wholly owned subsidiary of Harvey Publications, Inc.

In 1985 the Marvel imprint Star Comics published a title called Royal Roy. Harvey sued Star for copyright infringement, claiming that Roy was a blatant copy of Richie Rich. Veteran Harvey writer-artist Lennie Herman had created Royal Roy for Star Comics. Herman died in 1983 before the first issue of Royal Roy was published. The Royal Roy comic ended after six issues and the lawsuit was dropped.

In 1986, Harvey resumed publication under the leadership of Alan Harvey (Alfred's oldest son), focusing on a few core titles, digests, and reprints.

In 1987, Harvey sued Columbia Pictures, for $50 million, claiming that the ghost in the logo of the film Ghostbusters was too reminiscent of Fatso from the Casper series. The court ruled in Columbia's favor, due to Harvey's failure to renew the copyrights on early Casper stories and the "limited ways to draw a figure of a cartoon ghost".

=== Later history ===
In 1989, Harvey Comics was sold to Jeffrey Montgomery's HMH Communications and was renamed as Harvey Comics Entertainment, later named The Harvey Entertainment Company. located in Santa Monica, California. Under the new ownership, the company emphasized on re-syndicating their properties for both television and in press.

Following the initial wave of syndicating the Harvey catalogue, Harvey began producing their own original programs including The Baby Huey Show and Richie Rich, as well as producing feature-length films under an agreement with Universal Pictures, including Richie Rich and Casper, later outsourcing the production of direct-to-video material for both franchises over to Saban Entertainment.

Montgomery was ousted from the company in March 1998, and following various acquisitions and expansions to add content outside of the Harvey Classics including the purchase of PM Entertainment, Harvey was close to going into liquidation. In February 2001, The Harvey Entertainment Company announced that it would sell the entire Harvey catalogue over to Classic Media, a deal of which would close by June 2001.

The rights to Sad Sack, Black Cat, and certain other Harvey characters are still owned by Alan Harvey, and have been published under the names of Lorne-Harvey Publications and Re-Collections. In late 2000, Alan Harvey sued Steve Geppi over his 1984 acquisition of the Sad Sack original art, charging that Geppi had plundered Harvey's warehouses. Geppi countersued, claiming that he had legal title to the original art. The suit was settled in late 2002; at the time of the settlement, the New York Supreme Court had dismissed Harvey's claims against Geppi. The settlement agreement allowed Geppi to keep the art, with no money changing hands.

== Distribution of cartoons ==
For years, the television distribution rights to the Harveytoons library were licensed to Worldvision Enterprises. Worldvision would hold distribution rights to many earlier Famous Studios cartoons (plus most of the cartoons by Fleischer Studios) for a short time, until being absorbed by the television division of Paramount Pictures, which originally distributed the cartoons.

Universal Studios, which owns the pre-1950 Paramount sound features through its television division, once held video rights to the Harvey-owned cartoons, until 2001 when Classic Media obtained the animated catalog. In 2016, rights to the Harvey Comics properties returned to Universal when they acquired Classic Media's parent company, DreamWorks Animation, who later produced Harvey Street Kids (later renamed Harvey Girls Forever!) based on Harvey Comics characters.

== Harvey characters ==
=== Harvey Girls ===
- Little Audrey
- Little Dot
- Little Lotta

=== Casper and his friends ===
- Casper the Friendly Ghost
- Spooky the Tuff Little Ghost
- Pearl ("Poil") (Spooky's girlfriend)
- The Ghostly Trio: Stretch, Fatso and Stinkie (Casper's uncles, originally as Lazo and Fusso)
- Nightmare the Galloping Ghost (Casper's horse)
- Hot Stuff the Little Devil
- Princess Charma (Hot Stuff's girlfriend)
- Aunt Clinker (Hot Stuff's aunt)
- Wendy the Good Little Witch
- Witch Sisters: Thelma, Velma and Zelma (Wendy's aunts)

=== Richie Rich and his friends ===
- Richie Rich, the Poor Little Rich Boy
- Reginald "Reggie" Van Dough Jr. (Richie's antagonistic cousin)
- Cadbury (Richie's butler)
- Mr. Rich (Richie's father)
- Mrs. Rich (Richie's mother)
- Mayda Munny
- Gloria Glad (Richie's girlfriend)
- Irona (Richie's robot maid)
- Dollar (Richie's dog)
- Freckles and Pee-Wee (Richie's best friends)
- Jackie Jokers the Clown Prince of Show Biz
- Billy Bellhops
- Timmy Time

=== Other characters ===
- Baby Huey
- Boys' Ranch (created and owned by Joe Simon and Jack Kirby)
- Bunny (teen girl)
- Buzzy the Crow
- The Cowsills (based on the rock group)
- Flat-Top
- Herman and Katnip
- Mama Duck (Baby Huey's mother)
- Mazie
- Melvin (Little Audrey's boyfriend)
- Modern Madcaps (assorted characters)
- New Kids on the Block (based on the boy band)
- Papa Duck (Baby Huey's father)
- Rags Rabbit
- Sad Sack
- Stumbo the Giant
- Tommy Tortoise and Moe Hare

== Harvey superheroes ==
=== Golden Age ===
- Black Cat (owned by the Harvey estate, not to be confused with the Marvel Comics character of the same name)
- Black Orchid (not to be confused with the DC Comics character of the same name)
- Blazing Scarab
- Blonde Bomber
- Captain 3-D (owned by Simon and Kirby)
- Captain Freedom
- Clown
- Firebrand (not to be confused with the DC Comics character of the same name)
- Fly-Man (created by Sam Glanzman)
- Girl Commandoes (a multinational team of women soldiers consisting of two American [Captain Pat Parker aka War Nurse and Penelope "Penny" Kirk], one British [Lieutenant Ellen Billing], one Russian [Tanya] and one Chinese [Mei Ling], introduced in Harvey's Speed Comics; portrayed fighting Nazi and Japanese soldiers in World War II)
- Shock Gibson
- Barry Kuda
- Human Meteor
- Neptina
- Night Hawk
- Pat Parker
- Phantom Sphinx
- Red Blazer
- Red Demon
- Scarlet Arrow
- Scarlet Nemesis
- Scarlet Phantom
- Spirit of '76
- Spitfire (Mahon)
- Stuntman (owned by Joe Simon & Jack Kirby)
- White Mask
- Zebra

=== Silver Age (Harvey Thriller) ===
- Bee-Man
- Captain Flower
- Fighting American (a revival of the Prize Comics character, owned by Joe Simon & Jack Kirby)
- Fruitman (owned by Warren Harvey)
- Glowing Gladiator
- Jack Q. Frost
- Jigsaw (owned by Joe Simon)
- Magic Master
- Man in Black
- Miracles, Inc
- Pirana (owned by Joe Simon)
- Sooper Hippie
- Spyman (owned by Joe Simon)
- Tiger Boy (owned by Joe Simon)

== See also ==
- List of television series and films based on Harvey Comics publications
