= Richie Rich's Christmas Wish =

- DVD cover
- Directed by: John Murlowski
- Screenplay by: Rob Kerchner; Jason Feffer
- Story by: Mark Furey
- Based on: Richie Rich by: Alfred Harvey; Warren Kremer
- Produced by: Mike Elliott
- Starring: David Gallagher; Martin Mull; Lesley Ann Warren; Eugene Levy; Keene Curtis
- Cinematography: Christian Sebaldt
- Edited by: John Gilbert
- Music by: Deddy Tzur
- Production companies: Saban Entertainment; The Harvey Entertainment Company
- Distributed by: Warner Home Video
- Release date: November 3, 1998
- Running time: 84 minutes
- Country: United States
- Language: English
- Budget: $8 million

Richie Rich's Christmas Wish (also known as Richie Rich 2) is a 1998 American Christmas comedy film based on the Harvey Comics cartoon character Richie Rich. It is a stand-alone sequel to the 1994 film Richie Rich, starring David Gallagher as the title character, replacing Macaulay Culkin. Martin Mull, Lesley Ann Warren, Keene Curtis and Eugene Levy replace Edward Herrmann, Christine Ebersole, Jonathan Hyde and Mike McShane respectively. Its plot is similar to the 1946 film It's a Wonderful Life, placing Richie Rich in the role of George Bailey and Reggie Van Dough in the role of Mr. Potter.

== Plot ==
On Christmas Eve, Richie Rich races with his friends with actual cars. Controlling the cars with a special remote, Herbert Cadbury guides the children back to Richie's manor. He instructs Richie to change his clothes and get ready for tea. Before doing so, Richie visits Professor Keanbean, who reveals his recent invention, a wishing machine that works only on Christmas Eve.

During tea, Richie meets his cousin Reggie Van Dough, who wishes that he was as rich as Richie. Later, Richie dresses up like an elf with Cadbury as Santa Claus to distribute Christmas presents to an orphanage. While getting ready, Cadbury mentions that he was a rock star in a band called Root Canal in his youth. They then take off in the sleigh with Richie driving it. Reggie takes control of the sleigh, using the remote invented by Keanbean that Cadbury used earlier. He guides it through streets by shops, houses, and people. The sleigh eventually falls and explodes along with the presents, while Cadbury hurts his ankle badly. Richie runs off to fetch help, but after entering the city, he sees that the situation has changed dramatically. Reggie is spreading rumors about Richie, and everyone has turned against him.

Believing that the incident was his fault, a devastated Richie sits down in front of the wishing machine as it powers on. While fretting over his supposed ill luck, he accidentally wishes that he was never born; the machine grants his wish, and Richie is transported to another world where he was never born and nobody recognizes him, including his friends. Through them, however, Richie learns that Reggie sued his parents for neglect, and as his godparents, Richard and Regina were granted custody. Reggie has now taken over as the Rich's son, and is now the richest kid in the world; he bosses around everyone and roads and buildings are named after him. Reggie also controls the entire town, including the police force, the world is full of hunger and poverty, and Richard and Regina are at odds due to the stress Reggie has caused them. Richie realizes that things would not be better if he were not born and decides he must return to the world in which he was born.

Though his parents no longer recognize Richie, his dog, Dollar, does. He takes Dollar with him, which enrages Reggie, his current owner. Reggie orders policemen to search for Richie, who is labelled a "dognapper", and announces a reward for catching him. After outsmarting policemen who try to catch him, Richie finds Cadbury, still part of Root Canal, and Keanbean, who runs a laboratory called "Keanbean's World of Wonders". Richie questions Keanbean about the wishing machine, which requires a Pegliasaurus wishing bone to be complete.

Aided by his friends, Richie goes to the city museum to retrieve the bone from a Pegliasaurus skeleton. After passing through laser detection systems, they get it with a fishing rod invented by Keanbean for Richard. Before leaving the museum, Richie and his friends spot Reggie's parents now working as night guards, the only job they could get after Reggie sued them.

Once they reach the lab, they get the machine to work. However, Reggie arrives with the policemen before Richie can make his wish. Richie, Cadbury, Keanbean, and Richie's friends are imprisoned, while Reggie takes the machine home. At home, Reggie wishes for the ability to fly, but before he can make another wish, Dollar runs off with the wishbone. When it does not work the second time, he leaves the room in a huff, and retires. In jail, Richie and his friends are bailed out by Root Canal. They all rush to the manor, and Richie tries to make a wish while Reggie is still sleeping. However, the machine is no longer working, as Reggie had kicked it in anger earlier. While Keanbean fixes it, Reggie wakes up and comes flying in, only to be subdued by Richie and his friends. After this, everyone quits working for Reggie. The machine starts working again, and Richie wishes he was born.

Richie later sets right all the things that had gone wrong since his vanishing act. Everyone is glad to have him back, so they gather around a Christmas tree and sing.

=== Extended TV ending ===
Reggie's parents catch him red-handed with his actions against Richie and make him apologize for all the trouble he caused Richie, admitting that he was the one who took control of the sleigh and ruined the event. Realizing that the incident was not his fault, Richie forgives Reggie.

== Cast ==
- David Gallagher as Richie Rich
- Martin Mull as Richard Rich
- Jake Richardson as Reggie Van Dough
- Keene Curtis as Herbert Cadbury
- Michelle Trachtenberg as Gloria Glad
- Lesley Ann Warren as Regina Rich
- Eugene Levy as Professor Keanbean
- Marla Maples as Mrs. Van Dough
- Richard Fancy as Mr. Van Dough
- Richard Riehle as Sgt. Kenneth Carl Mooney
- Kathleen Freeman as Mrs. Lisa Peabody
- Blake Jeremy Collins as Freckles
- Austin Stout as Pee Wee
- Don McLeod as Irona / Evil Irona

== Production ==
After certain merchandising rights expired in April 1996, Harvey Entertainment managed to secure the rights to produce direct-to-video productions off its characters, including Richie Rich, and signed a production deal with Saban Entertainment. At the time Cathy Hoffman Glosser joined Saban Entertainment as the director of licensing and merchandising from DIC Entertainment, Saban had seen popularity wane from some of its brands like Mighty Morphin Power Rangers as well as experienced box office disappointment with Mighty Morphin Power Rangers: The Movie and adjusted their marketing strategy such as retooling Power Rangers with Power Rangers Zeo and co-producing direct-to-video follow-ups to Harvey's films such as Casper and Richie Rich given the strong recognition of the brand license.

The Langham Huntington Hotel and Spa, in Pasadena, California, was used for exterior scenes of the sprawling Rich Family Mansion. The interior lobby and vault of the disused Valuta Bank building, in downtown Los Angeles, was used for the scene in which Richie traps the pursuing Rich security men. The background music in selected scenes was also used in Digimon, Casper: A Spirited Beginning and Casper Meets Wendy. Colonial Street at Universal City, previously used in The Munsters, Leave it to Beaver, and The 'Burbs, is also featured.

== Release ==
The film was released on home video on November 10, 1998.

== See also ==
- List of Christmas films
