= Richie Rich =

Richie Rich may refer to:

== Arts and entertainment ==
- Richie Rich (character), a fictional character in the Harvey Comics universe
  - Richie Rich (1980 TV series), an animated TV series by Hanna-Barbera
  - Richie Rich (1996 TV series), an animated television series by Harvey Films and Film Roman
  - Richie Rich (2015 TV series), an American sitcom series by DreamWorks
  - Richie Rich (film), a 1994 film
- Richie Rich, a fictional character in the sitcom Filthy Rich & Catflap

== People ==
- Richie Rich (designer) (fl. from 1993), an American fashion designer and personality
- Richie Rich (rapper) (Richard Serrell, born 1967), an American rapper
- DJ Richie Rich (Richard Lawson, fl. from 1988), a Jamaican-American DJ and producer
- The Real Richie Rich (born 1964), an American rapper and record producer

== See also ==
- Richard Rich (disambiguation)
- Rishi Rich (Rishpal Singh Rekhi, born 1976), British-Indian music producer
- Ricky Rich (born 1999), Swedish rapper
- Riky Rick (born 1987), South African rapper
