= Richie Rich (film) =

- Theatrical release poster
- Directed by: Donald Petrie
- Screenplay by: Tom S. Parker; Jim Jennewein
- Story by: Neil Tolkin
- Based on: Richie Rich by Alfred Harvey; Warren Kremer
- Produced by: Joel Silver; John Davis
- Starring: Macaulay Culkin; John Larroquette; Edward Herrmann; Jonathan Hyde; Christine Ebersole; Stephi Lineburg; Michael McShane; Mariangela Pino; Chelcie Ross
- Cinematography: Don Burgess
- Edited by: Malcolm Campbell
- Music by: Alan Silvestri
- Production companies: Silver Pictures; Davis Entertainment
- Distributed by: Warner Bros.
- Release date: December 21, 1994
- Running time: 94 minutes
- Country: United States
- Language: English
- Budget: $40 million
- Box office: $76 million

Richie Rich (stylized as Ri¢hie Ri¢h) is a 1994 American adventure comedy film directed by Donald Petrie. The film is loosely based on the comic character of the same name created by Alfred Harvey and Warren Kremer. The film was distributed by Warner Bros. under their Family Entertainment label. The film stars Macaulay Culkin, John Larroquette, Edward Herrmann, Jonathan Hyde, and Christine Ebersole, while Reggie Jackson, Claudia Schiffer, and Ben Stein appear in cameo roles. Culkin's younger brother, Rory Culkin, played the part of Young Richie Rich. In theaters, the film was shown with a Wile E. Coyote and the Road Runner cartoon called Chariots of Fur. It was followed by the 1998 direct-to-video sequel Richie Rich's Christmas Wish with a complete new cast.

== Plot ==
Richard "Richie" Rich Jr. is "the world's richest boy", living in Chicago with his billionaire parents Richard Sr. and Regina. Under the care of his loyal butler Herbert Cadbury, scientist Professor Keenbean, and his dog Dollar, Richie enjoys a luxurious but lonely life. At his father's reopening of the local United Tool factory, Richie sees union rep Diane Koscinski's daughter Gloria and her friends playing sandlot ball, and later attemps to befriend them.

Laurence Van Dough, the greedy CFO of Rich Industries, plots with head of security Ferguson to kill the Riches and steal their fortune, believed to be stored in the family's secret vault. As the Riches prepare for a visit to England, Ferguson plants a bomb among their gifts for the Queen's birthday. Cadbury convinces Regina to let Richie stay home instead, and arranges for a day of fun with the sandlot kids, accompanied by Diane. Though initially bribed by Cadbury, the kids decline the money after genuinely having fun with Richie.

Flying the plane themselves, Richard and Regina discover the bomb just before it explodes, crashing the plane into the ocean. Stranded on a life raft, Richie's parents are presumed dead, and Van Dough takes control of Rich Industries. He attempts to close United Tool, prompting Richie to assume leadership of the company himself, with Cadbury as his legal guardian and business proxy. Determined to seize the Riches' fortune, Van Dough has Cadbury framed for the bombing and arrested, and subsequently petitions successfully to take over as Richie's guardian. He then removes Richie as the company's leader, dismisses the rest of the Rich family servants, and installs his own security team at Rich Manor to keep Richie prisoner.

Overhearing Van Dough's plan to have Cadbury killed in jail, Professor Keenbean warns Richie, who sneaks out and rescues Cadbury. They enlist the help of Gloria and Diane, while Van Dough and Ferguson threaten Keenbean into revealing that the family vault requires a voice-activated code from Richard and Regina. At sea, Richard manages to repair his "Dadlink", a device allowing Richie to track him anywhere in the world. Using Gloria's computer, Richie finds the Dadlink's signal, but Ferguson intercepts the coordinates and captures Richard and Regina.

Richie and Gloria rally their friends to break into Rich Manor with Cadbury and Diane, using Keenbean's inventions against Van Dough's men. Holding Richard and Regina at gunpoint, Van Dough is led to the vault hidden within "Mount Richmore", their gigantic mountainside family portrait. Inside, he is furious, disappointed, and outraged to discover no money (which is in banks, the stock market, real estate, and insurance companies), but what the Riches actually value most: their priceless collection of treasured family mementos and heirlooms. Richie confronts Van Dough, who shoots him, but the bullets prove harmless thanks to Keenbean's impervious spray. Van Dough pursues the Riches down the side of the mountain, until Cadbury disarms Ferguson and the Riches subdue Van Dough and fire him for everything he did to them.

Days later, Richie plays baseball with Gloria and their friends for the United Tool team on Rich Manor's yard, coached by Cadbury, who shares a kiss with Diane. Van Dough and Ferguson serve as the manor's gardeners as part of their work release, while Richard and Regina are overjoyed that Richie has finally found what money cannot buy: friends.

== Cast ==
- Macaulay Culkin as Richard "Richie" Rich Jr.
  - Rory Culkin as Young Richie Rich
  - Peter Lampley as Baby Richie Rich
- John Larroquette as Laurence Van Dough – the greedy CFO of Rich Enterprises, who plots to steal the Rich family fortune.
- Edward Herrmann as Richard Rich Sr. – the father of Richie.
- Jonathan Hyde as Herbert Arthur Runcible Cadbury – the Rich family's trustworthy butler.
- Christine Ebersole as Regina Rich – the mother of Richie.
- Stephi Lineburg as Gloria Koscinski – Richie's friend.
- Michael McShane as Professor Keenbean – a brilliant inventor who works for Rich Industries and whose lab is in the basement of Rich Manor.
- Mariangela Pino as Diane Koscinski – Gloria's mother and a love interest for Cadbury.
- Chelcie Ross as Ferguson – the Rich family's rude and tough security chief, who plots with Van Dough to usurp the Rich empire.
- Michael Maccarone as Tony – the second friend of Richie.
- Joel Robinson as Omar – the third friend of Richie.
- Jonathan Hilario as Pee Wee – the fourth friend of Richie.
- Reggie Jackson as Himself – Richie's private baseball coach.
- Matt DeCaro as Dave Walter – the plant manager for United Tool.
- Claudia Schiffer as Herself – Richie's private aerobics instructor.
- Ben Stein as Economics Teacher
- Sean A. Tate as Reynolds
- Joel Ellegant as Ellsworth
- Justin Zaremby as Reginald
- Eddie Bo Smith as Ambler

== Production ==
Harvey Comics had been attempting to develop a film adaptation of Richie Rich since the early 1980s when Ricky Schroder was eyed as a potential candidate for the lead role before financial problems at Harvey saw the project shelved. In December 1989, it was reported that producer Joel Silver had acquired the rights to Richie Rich with Fred Savage attached to play the titular role. Savage was looking to star in Richie Rich as a potential project during hiatus from The Wonder Years, but stalled development ultimately saw the actor aged out of consideration for the role. By 1991, Savage was replaced with Macaulay Culkin. In September 1993, it was reported Culkin's father/business manager, Kit Culkin, abused his director-approval privilege rejecting both John G. Avildsen and Joe Johnston and refusing to even attend meetings with director candidates David Mickey Evans, Peter Hewitt and Bryan Spicer. Warner Bros. executives became frustrated to the point they ended negotiations with Culkin in search of a new actor. A week later, it was reported that attempts were being made to repair the rift between Culkin and Warner Bros. The draft when Avildsen was attached would've taken inspiration from The Prince and the Pauper and featured Culkin in a dual role. The following month, when asked about the possibility of Culkin coming back to the film, Silver said, "it's over as far as I'm concerned". By December of that year, it was reported that Macaulay Culkin was reattached to Richie Rich with a guaranteed $8 million and $10 million option if a sequel were made on the condition that Kit Culkin relinquish his director-approval privilege.

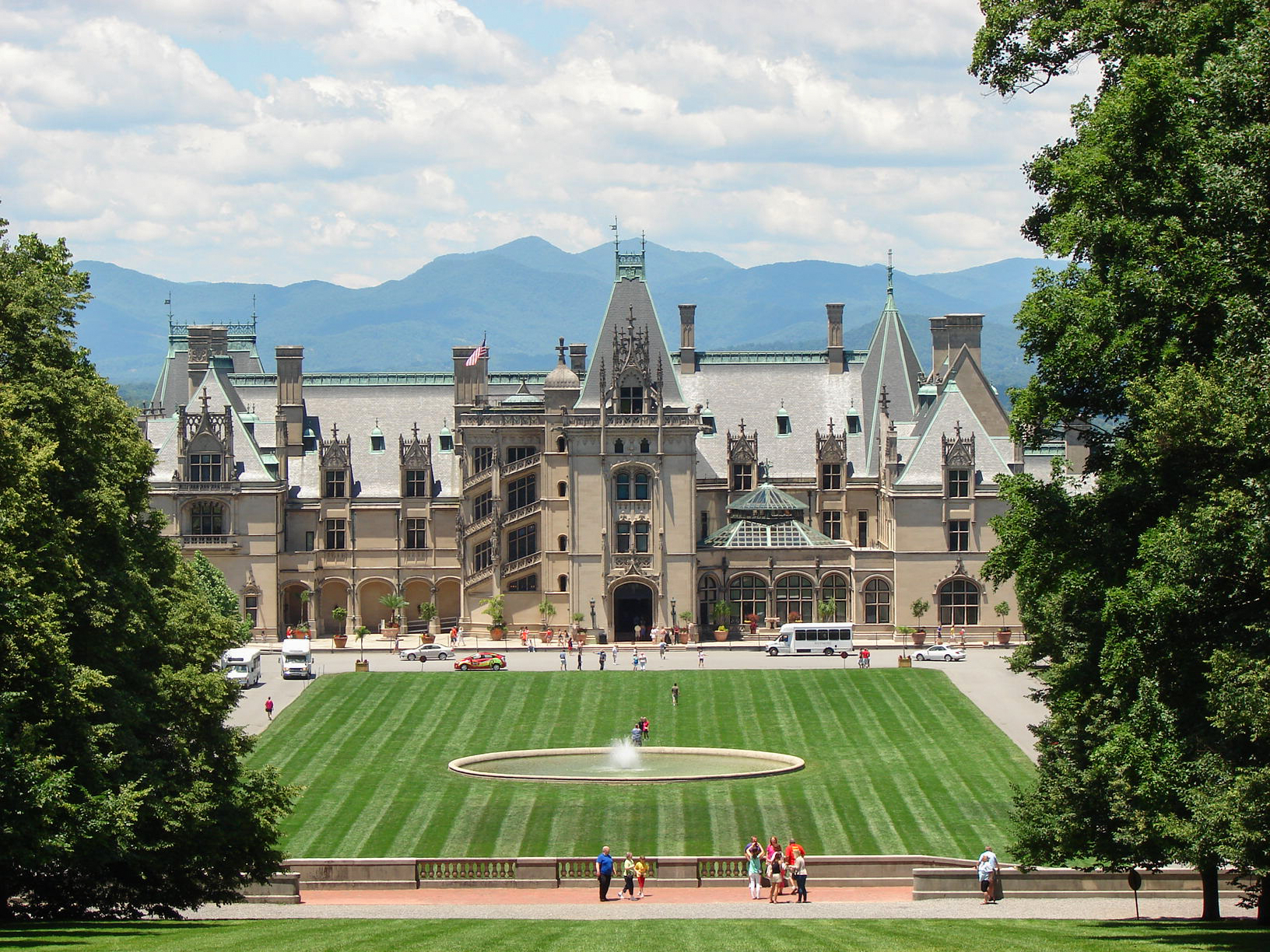
Biltmore Estate, where many of the scenes were filmed

Though set in Chicago, the house and grounds at which most of Richie Rich is filmed are those of the Biltmore Estate in Asheville, North Carolina. Some scenes, however, are filmed in Chicago, including a fencing scene filmed at DePaul University's Cortelyou Commons & the Ravenswood Manor neighborhood including the Francisco stop on the CTA Brown line. The roller coaster in the backyard is the former stand-up roller coaster Iron Wolf at Six Flags Great America. In contrast to the famous publication and animated series, a few characters are eliminated to accommodate the film: among them are Irona the robot maid.

Data East was one of few regular pinball companies that manufactured custom pinball games e.g. for the film Richie Rich. This pinball machine was based on The Who's Tommy Pinball Wizard machine.

== Reception ==
The film has been met with mixed-to-negative reception. A Los Angeles Times reviewer praised the actors' portrayal of characters in the film. Roger Ebert gave the film 3 out of 4 stars saying he was surprised how much he enjoyed it and said that though it was not the greatest film, he liked that it had style and did not go for cheap payoffs. Richie Rich earned a Razzie Award nomination for Macaulay Culkin as Worst Actor for his performance in the film (also for Getting Even with Dad and The Pagemaster) but lost the award to Kevin Costner for Wyatt Earp. Culkin was also nominated for a YoungStar Award in the category of Best Performance by a Young Actor in a Comedy Film, but lost the award to Joseph Gordon-Levitt for Angels in the Outfield.

Richie Rich received a 26% rating on Rotten Tomatoes based on 23 reviews, with an average rating of 4.5/10. The site's critical consensus reads: "With Macaulay Culkin barely registering any emotion, Richie Rich feels disjointed and free of a sense of fun and wonderment." On Metacritic, the film has a weighted average score of 49 out of 100 based on 17 critics, indicating "mixed or average reviews". Audiences polled by CinemaScore gave the film an average grade of "A-" on an A+ to F scale.

The film grossed $38 million at the box office in the United States and Canada and the same internationally for a worldwide total of $76 million on a $40 million budget. It was an even bigger home video success, with $125 million in VHS rentals and, as of April 1997, $44.2 million in retail sales, the studio receiving 75%.

== Year-end lists ==
- Fifth worst – Sean P. Means, The Salt Lake Tribune

== Sequel ==
Richie Rich's Christmas Wish is a 1998 direct-to-video sequel starring David Gallagher in the titular role.
