= Sid Couchey =

American cartoonist

- Born: May 24, 1919 Cleveland, Ohio
- Died: March 11, 2012 (aged 92) Inman, South Carolina
- Area: Artist
- Notable works: Richie Rich; Little Lotta; Little Dot

Sid Couchey (May 24, 1919 – March 11, 2012) was an American comic book artist best known for his work on the Harvey Comics characters Richie Rich, Little Lotta and Little Dot. His style is known for big, friendly faces and a sharp sense of visual humor.

Born in Cleveland, Ohio, Couchey enrolled in the Landon School of Illustration and Cartooning, a correspondence course out of Cleveland. He continued to practice his craft on the back of his school papers. He cited Milton Caniff's Steve Canyon, Alex Raymond's Flash Gordon and Howard Pyle among his influences.

== Comic strips ==
Couchey graduated from the Art Career School and the Cartoonists and Illustrators School (which later became the School of Visual Arts), both located in New York City. For his first job after art school, Couchey assisted John Lehti on the comic strips Tommy of the Big Top and Tales from the Great Book. In his home, Sid displayed an original piece from Tales from the Great Book, in which he appears as the census taker and scribe for the Pharaoh.

In the early 1950s, Couchey worked on backgrounds for the Lassie, Big Town and Howdy Doody TV tie-in books. His first complete work was published in Hoot Gibson #6, and several Couchey-illustrated stories appear in New Heroic Comics, published by Eastern Color Printing. His stories were printed in issues #62, 70, 71, 74, 75, 76, 78, 80 and 82.

== Harvey Comics ==
Couchey's break came when Harvey Comics advertised for cartoonists. A few of Couchey's fellow art school graduates, who had started an art studio of their own, told him about the advertisements. At Harvey, Couchey's artwork began appearing in the Little Dot, Little Lotta and Richie Rich titles throughout the 1950s and 1960s, with reprints appearing for many years. Couchey did not create these famous Harvey characters, but he did have the opportunity to change attitudes or events.

== Good Old Days ==
In the early 1980s, Couchey provided spot illustrations for Good Old Days magazine. In the spring of 1994, Couchey received a Lifetime Achievement Award at the Kansas City Comics Convention. The other honorees included John Byrne, George Pérez and Lee Falk.

Couchey kept busy with local artwork, especially with many cartoons devoted to Champ, the Monster of Lake Champlain. A second cousin to Scotland's "Nessie", Champy has been sighted for centuries in the Port Henry region of Lake Champlain, even by Samuel de Champlain himself (who described the creature as a 20-foot (6.1 m)-long serpent with the head of a horse).

In addition to his work with Champy, Couchey also contributed artwork to alcohol-awareness programs for the State of Vermont. In the mid-1980s, Dr. John K. Worden and his University of Vermont team invited Sid and Vermonter Jim Starbuck to create a “spokestoon” to deter alcohol abuse—thus, the noble character of Rascal Raccoon emerged. Around that time, Jim Heltz of Green Mountain Video worked with Couchey to create the “Drinking Dog/Cool Cat” series as part of an alcohol-awareness program for the State of Vermont. These characters were featured in various posters and animated TV spots to present an anti-alcohol message to children.

The last cartoon of Rascal showed him with terminal rabies being helped to walk at his retirement party by Drinking Dog & Cool Cat. The reason was that Rascal was being permanently retired because a rabid raccoon bit a prominent Vermont doctor. (Source: Harveyville Fun Times Vol.12, #47, 2002)

== Tom Tyler Tales ==
Calvin Castine, writer and videographer of Hometown Cable in Champlain, New York, invited Couchey, along with famed cartoonist Arto Monaco, creator of the Land of Makebelieve amusement park, to join him in the production of a comic book honoring the memory of Tom Tyler, a B-movie hero and matinee idol who was born in Port Henry, New York. Tom Tyler Tales and its sequel, Tom Tyler Tales, Too, written and produced by Castine, are still in print and are available at Hometown Cable and other outlets. Author Morris Glenn worked with Couchey on another history-oriented book, A Walk Around Whallon’s Bay.

== Paintings ==
In 1964, Couchey was one of six founders of the Adirondack Art Association in Essex, New York.

Couchey and his wife Ruth made appearances at book signings and comic-book conventions, in addition to visiting cartoon museums and libraries. Couchey completed a series of paintings that echo his professional training, Champy in the Style of the Old Masters, which has been on display in Plattsburgh and at the Ticonderoga Cartoon Museum. In this collection, Couchey portrays the famous lake-serpent as he would have been painted by Seurat and Picasso, among others.

Cartoonists and comic-book artists love to add in-jokes to their work, and Couchey was no exception. He included local references in dozens of books. The residents of northern New York would be surprised to find the names of nearby towns in the pages of a Harvey book. In one Little Lotta story, Couchey drew a strip around an athletic contest between the towns of Keeseville and Willsboro. Years later, Couchey met a basketball coach from Keeseville, who had been wondering "how the heck [our town] ever got in that comic and why they had to lose to Willsboro!" This story, entitled "Not Qualified", appears in Little Dot's Uncles & Aunts #8.

In the April 1960 (Vol. 1, No. 55) issue of Little Dot, Sid Couchey appears in a Little Lotta strip, "Problem Child", along with his then-fiancée Ruth Horne. They were married on November 14, 1959. Sid and Ruth Couchey lived in Inman, South Carolina and Essex, New York.

In February 2012, Couchey was diagnosed with Burkitt's lymphoma. The aggressive cancer took hold quickly, and Couchey died on March 11, 2012, aged 92. He was survived by his wife of 52 years, Ruth; their two children, Brian and Laura; and many grandchildren.

== Exhibitions ==
The Heritage Society of Willsboro, New York, invited Couchey to use part of their newly renovated facility as a permanent home for the display of his paintings and drawings. The opening reception was held on Friday, June 6, 2008 in Willsboro.
