= Harvey Girls Forever! =

American animated comedy-drama television series

- Also known as: Harvey Street Kids (season 1)
- Genre: Animation; Comedy
- Based on: Characters by Harvey Comics Little Audrey by Bill Tytla Little Dot and Little Lotta by Alfred Harvey; Sid Couchey (artist); Vic Herman (artist)
- Developed by: Emily Brundige
- Showrunners: Brendan Hay; Aliki Theofilopoulos
- Voices of: Lauren Lapkus; Stephanie Lemelin; Kelly McCreary
- Theme music composer: Kay Hanley; Michelle Lewis; Dan Petty
- Opening theme: "Run This Street" by Lauren Lapkus, Stephanie Lemelin, and Kelly McCreary
- Composers: Jay Vincent; Steven Gizzi; Ryan Lofty
- Country of origin: United States
- Original language: English
- No. of seasons: 4
- No. of episodes: 52 (99 segments)

Production
- Executive producer: Brendan Hay
- Running time: 22 minutes
- Production company: DreamWorks Animation Television

Original release
- Network: Netflix
- Release: June 29, 2018 – January 10, 2020

Harvey Girls Forever!, originally titled Harvey Street Kids in its first season, then retroactively retitled, is an American animated comedy-drama television series produced by Brendan Hay and Aliki Theofilopoulos for DreamWorks Animation Television, and is based on comic book characters from Harvey Comics. It was the sequel to the Little Audrey media franchise, featuring the descendants of the Little Audrey characters.

It premiered on June 29, 2018, on Netflix and concluded on January 10, 2020. The series was removed from Netflix on July 17, 2025.

== Premise ==
From long kickball games through different flavors of ice cream to an brilliant climbing tree, most days on Harvey Street feel like a weekend. Energetic Audrey, intelligent Dot and kindhearted Lotta are BFFs (short for Best Friends Forever) & the street's guardians. They try to keep the Harvey Street great for the local kid residents and start their crazy afternoon adventures.

== Voice cast ==
- Stephanie Lemelin as Audrey
- Lauren Lapkus as Lotta
- Kelly McCreary as Dot
- Grey Griffin as Lucretia / Frufru / The Harvey Street Bow (usually abbreviated as just "The Bow")
- Atticus Shaffer as Melvin
- Danny Pudi as Tiny
- Utkarsh Ambudkar as Fredo
- Roger Craig Smith as Pinkeye / Bobby the Elder
- Jamaal Hepburn as Gerald
- Cree Summer as Zoe
- Chelsea Peretti as Maria
- Nat Faxon as Stu
- Jack Quaid as Richie Rich
- Bobby Moynihan as Casper
- Anna Camp as Chevron
- Dee Bradley Baker as Raccoons
- Chris Diamantopoulos as Additional voices
- Joey McIntyre, Nick Lachey, Joey Fatone, and Shawn Stockman as Crush4U

== Characters ==
Main

- Audrey (voiced by Stephanie Lemelin) - Audrey is a cute and energetic tomboy. She acts tough and loves doing boyish activities, like parkour, but she also enjoys doing girly stuff as well, such as playing with the Horn-A-Corns. She is also very impatient and short tempered. She is the brawn, but the childish one in the Harvey Girls group. She refers to herself as "the protector of Harvey Street." She believes in listening to her guts, taking action immediately and massively. She has a firm sense of what's right and wrong, and defends her friends and street, and tries to do what's right at any cost. However, this often leads to trouble as she doesn't think before she does.
- Dot (voiced by Kelly McCreary) - is a lot more serious than her friends Audrey and Lotta, as she is very cautious about many things. She is the brain of the Harvey Girls group and refers to herself as the "CEO of Harvey Street Enterprises." She loves precision, hence why she puts perfectly circular dots on everything she wears. She attempts to prepare for anything that comes up in order to handle every situation perfectly. She is also very DIY; designing her own clothes, building her own remote control helicopter, to making her own brand of gummy worms. Dot can go overboard in chasing down her ambitious dreams, but she is still a great friend to Audrey and Lotta.
- Lotta (voiced by Lauren Lapkus) - Lotta has a kind and caring personality, especially towards close friends and animals. She can also be frightened very easily. She takes friendship seriously and will do anything to keep her relationships stable. She likes befriending others as well. She refers to herself as "the best snuggler and cuddler of Harvey Street." Lotta sees the beauty in everything and everyone, which causes people to take advantage of her sometimes. She is also for any cute animal, as she describes herself as "friends with all animals," who usually come to her when she needs help (however, the only exception is raccoons). She has a hoard of pet rabbits. When she goes into a fit of rage, she hulks out. In that moment, her voice can also become deeper and raspier.

== Episodes ==
=== Series overview ===
Season	Segments	Episodes	Originally released
1	26	13	June 29, 2018
2	24	13	May 10, 2019
3	25	13	November 12, 2019
4	24	13	January 10, 2020

=== Season 1 (2018) ===
No. overall	No. in season	Title	Directed by	Written by	Storyboarded by	Original release date
1a	1a	"War and Trees"	Aliki Theofilopoulos	Story by : Emily Brundige; Teleplay by : Brendan Hay	Hillary Bradfield, Melody Iza, Scott O'Brien & Adam Rosette	June 29, 2018
The Harvey Girls help Tiny when the Bloogey Boys refuse him access to their treehouse for being too short.
1b	1b	"Trade Wreck"	Aliki Theofilopoulos	Story by : Emily Brundige; Teleplay by : Brendan Hay & Mike Yank	Marcelo Desouza, Aaron Fryer, Stephanie Gonzaga, Adam Rosette & Angelica "Jelly" Russell	June 29, 2018
Chaos ensues when the Harvey Girls break the rules of the Trading Tree to obtain some rare toys from Pinkeye.
2a	2a	"While You Weren't Sleeping"	Scott O'Brien	Caitlin Meares	Angelica "Jelly" Russell	June 29, 2018
Audrey installs lights across the neighborhood so that the fun doesn't have to end at sundown only to turn the other kids into sleep deprived zombies.
2b	2b	"The Secret Strife of Pets"	Scott O'Brien & Simon O'Leary	Story by : Emily Brundige; Teleplay by : Brendan Hay & Mike Yank	Mike Chavez & Scott O'Brien	June 29, 2018
A mysterious animal arrives on Harvey Street and Dot must overcome her apprehensions to help find them a new home.
3a	3a	"Harveyween"	Hillary Bradfield	Julia Miranda	Stephanie Gonzaga	June 29, 2018
On Halloween night, Lotta must face her fear of trick or treating to save Audrey and Dot from a mythical mud monster.
3b	3b	"New Kid on the Block"	Scott O'Brien	Mike Yank	Aaron Fryer	June 29, 2018
The Harvey Girls help a new kid named Gerald feel welcome when he moves to the block.
4a	4a	"It's a Wonderful LARP"	Hillary Bradfield & Murray Debus	Rachel McNevin	Gus Corrales, Simon O'Leary, Adam Rosette & Gie Santos	June 29, 2018
Audrey gets carried away when the Girls join the Bloogey Boys in a game of fantasy live action role playing.
4b	4b	"My Sectional Romance"	Murray Debus	Mike Yank	Vela Noble	June 29, 2018
The Harvey Girls and the Bloogey Boys fight over who gets to keep an old couch.
5a	5a	"Campfire Weekend"	Scott O'Brien	Jamie Uyeshiro	Angelica "Jelly" Russell	June 29, 2018
The Harvey Girls create their own camp on Harvey Street after a bus strike puts a damper on their previous plans.
5b	5b	"Girls Just Wanna Save Fun"	Hillary Bradfield	Brendan Hay	Adam Rosette	June 29, 2018
Lucretia tells the story of how Audrey, Dot and Lotta became the Harvey Girls and saved a tree from a team of land developers.
6a	6a	"FruLess"	Hillary Bradfield	Tesha Kondrat	Gus Corrales, Aaron Fryer & Stephanie Gonzaga	June 29, 2018
The Harvey Girls try to help Frufru make friends to invite to her birthday party.
6b	6b	"Citizen Cape"	Murray Debus	Jamie Uyeshiro	Vela Noble	June 29, 2018
Dot starts a business designing and selling capes to raise money to fix up the Harvey Kids' rundown park and fix numerous sinkholes.
7a	7a	"Cereal"	Hillary Bradfield	Mike Yank	Stephanie Gonzaga	June 29, 2018
Dot is on the case when someone steals the contents of the street's last box of Super Sweeto Cavity Blast'ems.
7b	7b	"Tiny Danger"	Murray Debus	Brendan Hay, Julia Miranda & Mike Yank	Vela Noble	June 29, 2018
Lotta trains Tiny for the annual Big Kid Bike Race.
8a	8a	"A Matter of Life and BFF"	Scott O'Brien	Rachel McNevin	Aaron Fryer	June 29, 2018
In this fireworks-filled episode, Lotta believes her friendship with Audrey and Dot is destined to end when their new friendship bracelets break.
8b	8b	"Cheer and Present Danger"	Hillary Bradfield	Jamie Uyeshiro	Adam Rosette	June 29, 2018
The Harvey Girls create a new holiday that revolves around friendship.
9a	9a	"Wary Lotta & the Chamber of Secrets"	Scott O'Brien	Rachel McNevin	Angelica "Jelly" Russell	June 29, 2018
Lotta tries to stop a flock of parrots from revealing her secret crush on Gerald.
9b	9b	"VHMess"	Murray Debus	Julia Miranda	Gie Santos	June 29, 2018
The Harvey Kids find a VHS tape of an action movie at the dump and decide to film their own ending after the tape cuts off at a pivotal moment.
10a	10a	"The Great Brain Robbery"	Scott O'Brien	Rachel McNevin	Aaron Fryer	June 29, 2018
Melvin undergoes a personality change after experiencing a brain freeze and tries to make up for his formerly bratty behavior.
10b	10b	"Can't Purr-y Love"	Hillary Bradfield	Jamie Uyeshiro	Adam Rosette	June 29, 2018
Lotta is distraught when a stray kitten seems to like everyone but her.
11a	11a	"Elder Skelter"	Hillary Bradfield	Jamie Uyeshiro	Stephanie Gonzaga	June 29, 2018
Audrey takes over for Bobby the Elder when he decides to retire but finds the job takes more responsibility than she thought.
11b	11b	"A More Perfect Reunion"	Murray Debus	Mike Yank	Gie Santos	June 29, 2018
Dot's competitive side takes over when she encounters her old classmate Chevron at their preschool reunion.
12a	12a	"Clinging in the Rain"	Scott O'Brien	Rachel McNevin	Angelica "Jelly" Russell	June 29, 2018
The Harvey Girls are forced to play inside on a rainy day and Lucretia sees it as a chance to hang out with them.
12b	12b	"Raccoon Hoarder Picture Show"	Murray Debus	Mike Yank	Vela Noble	June 29, 2018
The Harvey Girls head into the forest to track down the raccoons that stole their Horn-a-Corn dream house - but upon finding their hideout, they discover a few surprising secrets about the coons.
13a	13a	"Pretty in Pinkeye"	Scott O'Brien	Rachel McNevin	Aaron Fryer	June 29, 2018
Dot gives Pinkeye a makeover but his new look drastically changes his personality.
13b	13b	"The Monsters Are Due on Harvey Street"	Hilary Bradfield	Brendan Hay & Rachel McNevin	Gus Corrales & Adam Rosette	June 29, 2018
The kids believe a monster is responsible when someone or something vandalizes the statue of Harvey Street's founder.

=== Season 2 (2019) ===
No. overall	No. in season	Title	Directed by	Written by	Storyboarded by	Original release date
14	1	"Raiders of the Lost Park"	Hillary Bradfield & Scott O'Brien	Brendan Hay, Jamie Uyeshiro & Mike Yank	Stephanie Gonzaga & Angelica "Jelly" Russell	May 10, 2019
Continuing from last season's episode, Audrey's sister Zoe and the Fighting Banana cheer squad, have taken over. It's up to Audrey and the rest of the children to beat the fighting Banana Cheer Squad in a series of challenges and take back Harvey Street.
15a	2a	"Dottle Rocket"	Murray Debus	Sarah Nerboso	Vela Noble	May 10, 2019
The launch of the Harvey Girls' model rockets go wrong when Dot's Dotrocket doesn't descend after being launched. Parody name: "Bottle rocket" (a common firework)
15b	2b	"Weekend at Audrey's"	Murray Debus	Jamie Uyeshiro	Gie Santos & Simon O'Leary	May 10, 2019
After Audrey accidentally breaks Lotta's virtual pet, Hopscotch, she must hide the truth from her. Guest star: Justin Roiland as Hopscotch
16a	3a	"Boy Story"	Scott O'Brien	Rachel McNevin	Aaron Fryer	May 10, 2019
Lotta tries to masquerade as a boy to earn the Bloogey Boys' trust and enter their treehouse to retrieve her zebra doll.
16b	3b	"Puzzle, Puzzle, Toil and Trouble"	Hillary Bradfield	Mike Yank	Gus Corrales & Adam Rosette	May 10, 2019
During a sandwich giveaway, Fredo's puzzle hunt called a Perplexoquest is going puts the kids' brains to the test.
17a	4a	"Treasure of the Sierra Harvey"	Hillary Bradfield	Elliott Kalan	Stephanie Gonzaga	May 10, 2019
A map leads Tiny to a legendary stash of tossed-out toys.
17b	4b	"Babies Day In"	Jamie Uyeshiro	Murray Debus	Peter Yong	May 10, 2019
When Lotta finds a trio of baby racoons, she takes them home to raise them as her own.
18a	5a	"The Lice Storm"	Scott O'Brien	Rachel McNevin	Angelica "Jelly" Russell	May 10, 2019
Audrey in war has given lice because of Super Todd, and is being bald the rest of the day.
18b	5b	"Mission: ImpossiBow"	Murray Debus	Jamie Uyeshiro	Vela Noble	May 10, 2019
Dot has to determine to be included when The Bow leaves her of a secret mission, to which Lotta thinks is a surprise.
19a	6a	"The Fandom Menace"	Scott O'Brien	Mike Yank	Aaron Fryer	May 10, 2019
Lotta enters a contest to win a date with her favorite boy band, Crush 4U.
19b	6b	"Moby Dot"	Scott O'Brien	Mike Yank	Angelica "Jelly" Russell	May 10, 2019
Dot is hurting down the pearl tormentor hornet that's keeping kids out of the park.
20a	7a	"The Cheer Hunter"	Hillary Bradfield	Sarah Nerboso	Adam Rosette	May 10, 2019
Audrey is getting a cute surprise but is feeling herself over anger as Zoe invites Lotta join the cheer squad.
20b	7b	"Dot's Entertainment"	Hillary Bradfield	Elliott Kalan	Stephanie Gonzaga	May 10, 2019
Dot can't stop trying to make people laugh when she has been telling a spacey joke about aliens.
21	8	"I Wanna Crush Your Hand"	Aliki Theofilopoulos, Hillary Bradfield & Scott O'Brien	Brendan Hay, Rachel McNevin, Sarah Nerboso & Mike Yank	Aaron Fryer & Amie Pantle	May 10, 2019
On the day of the Crush 4U concert, Lotta gets a chance to meet the band. In the end, the kids watch the concert, except Lotta, who appears on the stage.
22a	9a	"Beyond Thunder Dot"	Murray Debus	Sarah Nerboso	Andrew Collins	May 10, 2019
Dot is shocked that Frufru doesn't believe in climate change.
22b	9b	"10 Things I Hate About Ew"	Murray Debus	Rachel McNevin	Vela Noble	May 10, 2019
After learning Melvin has a popular video channel, Lotta launches one of her own.
23a	10a	"Something's Glotta Give"	Murray Debus	Rachel McNevin	Vela Noble	May 10, 2019
Lucretia goes out of her way to bring Lotta and Gerald together.
23b	10b	"Afternoon Contrite"	Hillary Bradfield	Sarah Nerboso	Stephanie Gonzaga	May 10, 2019
Convinced she broke up the Bloogey Boys, Lotta sets out to reunite them.
24a	11a	"Can't Harvey Wait"	Adam Rosette & Aliki Theofilopoulos	Mike Yank	Angelica "Jelly" Russell	May 10, 2019
Lucretia shares a trio of fan fiction stories about the Harvey Girls on her radio show.
24b	11b	"Bring It Prawn"	Murray Debus	Rachel McNevin	Andrew Collins	May 10, 2019
Sparks fly for Audrey and Zoe at a shrimp-themed sibling beauty pageant.
25a	12a	"Hover, May I Board With Danger"	Adam Rosette	Mike Yank	Aaron Fryer	May 10, 2019
Audrey as attempted to be on Stu's good side wants to ride his hoverboard. Luckily, she gets a sporty surprise.
25b	12b	"Free Gilly"	Murray Debus	Rachel McNevin	Vela Noble	May 10, 2019
Billy, the skunk, sings his feelings in a memorable musical episode.
26a	13a	"That Thing You Dot!"	Hillary Bradfield	Sarah Nerboso	Amie Pantle	May 10, 2019
A punk-rock preschool rival inspires Dot and the girls to form a band.
26b	13b	"Where the Streets Have No Games"	Adam Rosette	Brendan Hay, Rachel McNevin, Sarah Nerboso & Mike Yank	Angelica "Jelly" Russell	May 10, 2019
A hot new handheld video game has the Harvey Street kids obsessed with screens. Guest star: Jack Quaid as Richie Rich

=== Season 3 (2019) ===
No. overall	No. in season	Title	Directed by	Written by	Storyboarded by	Original release date
27a	1a	"Get Rich Quick"	Hillary Bradfield	Brendan Hay, Rachel McNevin, Sarah Nerboso & Mike Yank	Caitlin Elise Willis	November 12, 2019
The Harvey Girls are getting a special surprise - the arrival of Richie Rich. Then, things go rough at a game-gone rogue when joy is being collected. Guest star: Jack Quaid as Richie Rich (which then appears throughout this and the next season).
27b	1b	"Noogie Nights"	Murray Debus & Dan Riba	Mike Yank	Andrew Collins	November 12, 2019
Lessons taught during a murder mystery party bring Richie to a close relationship of friends. Note: This is the first episode where Richie Rich is seen in its title card.
28a	2a	"Audrey Dreams of Ice Cream"	Adam Rosette	Sarah Nerboso	Andrew Marshel, Dan Riba	November 12, 2019
Audrey and her friends grab international ice creams.
28b	2b	"Blame That Tune"	Hillary Bradfield	Rachel McNevin	Amie Pantle	November 12, 2019
A fishy jingle brings in an earworm which turns the kids into "songies". Note: This is the first episode where the show's opening theme is sung.
29a	3a	"Bad Lot-tenant"	Adam Rosette	Rachel McNevin	Caitlin Elise Willis	November 12, 2019
Lotta takes a personality quiz and learns she's supposed to be evil.
29b	3b	"Jet Fretters"	Murray Debus, Dan Riba	Mike Yank	Vela Noble	November 12, 2019
Tiny and Lucretia offer to get the girls' costumes for the Horn-A-Corn convention.
30	4	"Now It's Con"	Murray Debus, Dan Riba, Adam Rosette	Brendan Hay, Rachel McNevin, Sarah Nerboso & Mike Yank	Andrew Marshel, Vela Noble, Peter Yong	November 12, 2019
Audrey, Dot, Lotta, Richie, Lucretia and Tiny arrive at Horn-A-Con and decide to divide and conquer, breaking into three groups for maximum adventure.
31a	5a	"A Stu Is Born"	Hillary Bradfield	Sarah Nerboso	Angelica "Jelly" Russell	November 12, 2019
Richie assembles a team to turn Stu into a social media celebrity.
31b	5b	"Ruffspringa"	Ruolin Li	Mike Yank	Amie Pantle	November 12, 2019
Richie has a sheltered talking dog named Dollar, who doesn't get much of being adorable. When fireworks frighten him, he makes new animal friends.
32a	6a	"Fast Times at Richmont Harv"	Murray Debus, Dan Riba	Rachel McNevin	Vela Noble	November 12, 2019
Richie works overtime to get the Bloogey Boys to like him.
32b	6b	"Sleepless in SkyMansion"	Adam Rosette	Sarah Nerboso	Caitlin Elise Ellis	November 12, 2019
Dot fights the urge to open a forbidden door in Richie's flying mansion.
33a	7a	"Skull & Bows"	Ruolin Li	Mike Yank	Angelica "Jelly" Russell	November 12, 2019
A suspicious Audrey investigates the Bow.
33b	7b	"Nine to Harv"	Murray Debus, Dan Riba	Rachel McNevin	Peter Yong	November 12, 2019
Richie helps Lotta launch her dream business: selling custom stuffed animals in San Francisco.
34a	8a	"Planet of the Capes"	Ruolin Li	Sarah Nerboso	Andrew Marshel	November 12, 2019
When Fredo publicly mocks a film, Lotta challenges him to make his own.
34b	8b	"Whole Lotta Like"	Adam Rosette	Brendan Hay, Rachel McNevin, Sarah Nerboso, Mike Yank (Story by Rachel Vine)	Aaron Fryer	November 12, 2019
Lotta catches her pet bunny "in like" with her kitty nemesis.
35a	9a	"Foldin' Girls"	Adam Rosette	Mike Yank	Caitlin Elise Willis	November 12, 2019
Dot faces off against Chevron in the North American Origami Gam Prix.
35b	9b	"V for Ven-Lotta"	Murray Debus, Dan Riba	Megan Atkinson	Vela Noble	November 12, 2019
When Frufru ruins the Ferris wheel she made out of uncooked pasta, Lotta wants payback before the contest begins.
36a	10a	"The Puppets Take Meanhattan"	Ruolin Li	Rachel McNevin	Angelica "Jelly" Russell	November 12, 2019
Lucretia finds out about her favorite idol, Patty Pupe. Guest star: Kristin Chenoweth as Patty Pupe
36b	10b	"Zen & The Art of Video Game Patience"	Murray Debus, Dan Riba	Sarah Nerboso	Peter Yong	November 12, 2019
Audrey battles her big sister for the best score on an old arcade game.
37a	11a	"A Tale of Three Kiddies"	Ruolin Li	Rachel McNevin	Andrew Marshel	November 12, 2019
In honor of #ThrowbackThursday, each Harvey Girl shares a story from her past.
37b	11b	"Austland City Limits"	Adam Rosette	Mike Yank	Gus Corrales, Aaron Fryer, Jassica Marshall, Angelica "Jelly" Russell, Trevor Tamboline, Caitlin Elise Willis	November 12, 2019
Gerald takes the gang to visit his hometown.
38a	12a	"The Future Is Frufru"	Murray Debus, Dan Riba	Sarah Nerboso	Vela Noble	November 12, 2019
Frufru is a psychic little girl and the Harvey Girls aren't into it.
38b	12b	"Harverado"	Adam Rosette	Mike Yank	Caitlin Elise Willis	November 12, 2019
Sheriff Dot wants to get revenge on a Bloogey-like team.
39a	13a	"A Butter Tomorrow"	Ruolin Li	Rachel McNevin	Angelica "Jelly" Russell	November 12, 2019
After a flood of butter threatens the lake ecosystem, Zoe retreats with Audrey through empathetic gameplay. Richie meets up with Victor Lavender from My Purple Agony. Guest star: Davey Havok as Victor Lavender
39b	13b	"Days of Future Presents"	Adam Rosette	Brendan Hay, Rachel McNevin, Sarah Nerboso, Mike Yank	Gus Corrales, John Reynolds, Trevor Tamboline, Lauren Zukauskas	November 12, 2019
The Harvey Girls learn about birthday parties and which ones their friends had the best by showing Richie how great it is to have one.

=== Season 4 (2020) ===
No. overall	No. in season	Title	Directed by	Written by	Storyboarded by	Original release date
40a	1a	"Get Rich or Cry Trying"	Roulin Li	Brendan Hay, Rachel McNevin, Sarah Nerboso, Mike Yank	Andrew Marshel	January 10, 2020
After their friends' birthday parties, the Harvey Girls save Richie from running away as Future Richie is seen in an app.
40b	1b	"Dingo Unchained"	Murray Debus, Dan Riba	Sarah Nerboso	Peter Yong	January 10, 2020
The gang goes camping in Australia.
41a	2a	"Miracle on Harvey Street"	Roulin Li	Sarah Nerboso	Angelica "Jelly" Russell	January 10, 2020
Lotta brings Hanukkah to Harvey Street with a live holiday special.
41b	2b	"I Know What You Did Last Stu-mmer"	Murray Debus	Marie Cheng	Peter Yong	January 10, 2020
Stu and Audrey get their hands on a jet pack to blast into space.
42a	3a	"Hero Effect"	Dan Riba	Rachel McNevin	Sophie Russell	January 10, 2020
Fredo's filming a second movie and starring in it, too, but his bloated ego is too much to bear.
42b	3b	"VR the World"	Roulin Li	Mike Yank	Andrew Marshel	January 10, 2020
Richie builds a game powered by RichCoins.
43a	4a	"The Dread Pirate Richie"	Ruolin Li	Sarah Nerboso	Andrew Marshel	January 10, 2020
A tech-obsessed Richie struggles to stick to the pirate code.
43b	4b	"Crush 4U Where RU?"	Adam Rosette, Dan Riba	Joey Manderino	Angelica "Jelly" Russell, John Reynolds, Lis Savic	January 10, 2020
In this Scooby-Doo parody adventure, Audrey solves the mystery of the missing Crush4U robot to finish Richie's surprise and in time for the Crush4U concert on New Year's Eve.
44a	5a	"Bobby of Influence"	Adam Rosette, Dan Riba	Mike Yank	Caitlin Elise Willis	January 10, 2020
While upholding the law on "The Elder's Court", Bobby is accused of a crime.
44b	5b	"Grill or Be Grilled"	Murray Debus, Dan Riba	Julia Miranda	Vela Noble	January 10, 2020
Richie vows to turn his grilled cheese stand into a profitable business.
45a	6a	"Grosse Point Prank"	Ruolin Li	Rachel McNevin	Angelica "Jelly" Russell	January 10, 2020
To realize his dream of becoming a Bloogey Boy, Richie must out-prank Melvin.
45b	6b	"Breaking Butt"	Murray Debus	Teresa Kale	Peter Yong	January 10, 2020
Audrey is sidelined after an injury but refuses to stop having fun.
46a	7a	"Chevronica Mars"	Dan Riba	Rachel McNevin	Caitlin Elise Willis	January 10, 2020
It's Dot vs. Chevron in a cutthroat Mars simulation contest.
46b	7b	"The Boy with the Dragon that Flew"	Murray Debus	Mike Yank	Vela Noble	January 10, 2020
A flying cybertronic dragon helps take Tiny to new heights.
47	8	"Misadventureland"	Ruolin Li, Dan Riba	Teresa Kale, Sarah Nerboso	Andrew Marshel, Angelica "Jelly" Russell	January 10, 2020
Richie brings Lotta's dream of a Horn-A-World theme park to life, complete with actual Horn-A-Corns, but the reality is a bit of a nightmare. Guest star: Judy Greer as Evil Narwhalla
48a	9a	"Wacky Weekday"	Murray Debus	Sarah Nerboso	Vela Noble	January 10, 2020
The Harvey Girls are splitting up for the day, but they've accidentally swapped suitcases and personalities.
48b	9b	"Hike Caramba!"	Dan Riba	Mike Yank	Caitlin Elise Willis	January 10, 2020
Dot trains to become a Trout Master.
49a	10a	"Richie Rich and the Tapir of Doom"	Ruolin Li	Mike Yank	Angelica "Jelly" Russell	January 10, 2020
Tiny and Lucretia sign on as sidekicks in Richie's search for a legendary treasure.
49b	10b	"Dollar, Dollar Saves Y'All"	Murray Debus	Teresa Kale	Peter Yong	January 10, 2020
Dollar is desperate to prove he's the Best Good Boy.
50a	11a	"Scare Bud"	Adam Rosette	Brendan Hay	Caitlin Elise Willis	January 10, 2020
There's an uninvited guest at the Bow's house: a not-so-scary ghost named Casper.
50b	11b	"All Harveys Eve"	Murray Debus, Dan Riba	Rachel McNevin	Vela Noble	January 10, 2020
On Halloween, Lotta tries to win a spooky storytelling contest.
51a	12a	"Harvily Ever After"	Ruolin Li	Mike Yank	Angelica "Jelly" Russell	January 10, 2020
Lucretia is wrapping up her Harvey Girls fan fiction podcast, but it's hard to say goodbye.
51b	12b	"Let It Zo"	Murray Debus, Dan Riba	Sarah Nerboso	Peter Yong	January 10, 2020
Zoe is convinced that Audrey stole her cheerleading baton.
52	13	"Harvey Endings"	Adam Rosette, Ruolin Li	Brendan Hay, Teresa Kale, Sarah Nerboso, Mike Yank	Aaron Fryer, Andrew Marshel	January 10, 2020
Lotta is leaving the street and moving out, and after Richie finishes his Childhood Immersive checklist, he sees the future of a mysterious friend. Audrey and Dot lead a musical performance to tell Lotta she'll always be a part of Harvey Street. In the end, the Harvey Girls go to an "epic dance party" with their friends complete with their parents.

== Production ==
Harvey Girls Forever! was dawned by artist Katie Rice in 2014 up until 2015. The show started production in Glendale, California in the following year in October. The second season was released on May 10, 2019, and was retitled Harvey Girls Forever! The third season premiered on November 12 the same year, introducing Richie Rich in the series. The fourth and final season, which has a Casper the Friendly Ghost cameo, premiered on January 10, 2020.

== Music ==
Music and songs are a central feature of Harvey Girls Forever! with showrunners Brendan Hay and Aliki Theofilopoulos creating a fictional boy band named Crush4U made up of actual boy band members to be the subject of affection for character Lotta. Aliki said that Harvey Street boy band version consists of New Kids on the Block's Joey McIntyre, Boyz II Men's Shawn Stockman, NSYNC's Joey Fatone and 98 Degrees' Nick Lachey. Original songs were produced by composers Jay Vincent, Steven Gizzi and Ryan Lofty. As part of the promotion for Harvey Girls Forever! season two the songs were made available for free download.

== Merchandise ==
Custom Ink is operating official Harvey Girls Forever! products.

== Release ==
The series premiered on Netflix on June 29, 2018, the full seasons are available for purchase on Apple TV+, as well as its first two seasons are available for purchase on VUDU, YouTube, Amazon Prime and Google Play. It was also broadcast on Family CHRGD in Canada and Télétoon+ in France.

== Reception ==
During its initial first season, the series received mixed-to-positive reviews. Emily Ashby of Common Sense Media described the series as "lots of playground fun" and said that while there aren't "deep learning takeaways", the series is fun in a "playful, adult-free childhood experience way". Ashby also said that the personalities of the characters are exaggerated, but there is a "lot that's positive" in a series which captures the "joy of childhood".
