= Richard Rich (disambiguation) =

Richard Rich, 1st Baron Rich (1496–1567) was Lord Chancellor of England.

Richard Rich may also refer to:

- Richard Rich (filmmaker) (fl. from 1969), an American director, producer, and screenwriter
- Richard Rich (Sheriff of London) (died c. 1464)
- Richard Rich Sr., father of fictional character Richie Rich (Richard $ Rich Jr.)

== See also ==
- Richie Rich (disambiguation)
