= Richie Rich (character) =

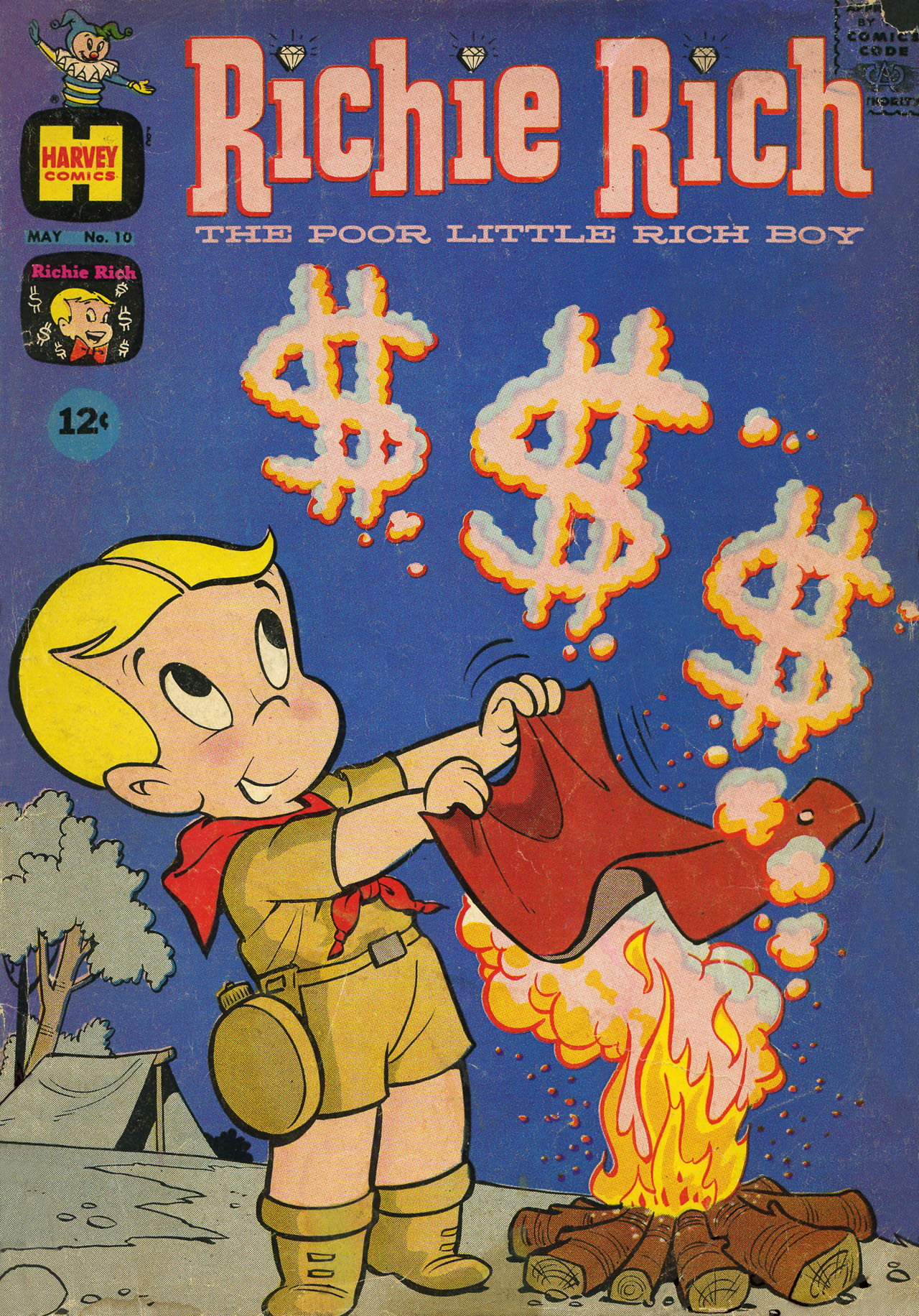
- Cover of Richie Rich no. 10 (May 1962)

Publication information
- Publisher: Harvey Comics
- First appearance: Little Dot #1 (1953)
- Created by: Alfred Harvey; Warren Kremer
- Voiced by: Sparky Marcus (1980-1984); Katie Leigh (1996)

In-story information
- Full name: Richard $ Rich Jr.
- Species: Human
- Team affiliations: Rich Industries

Richie Rich Jr. (often stylized as Ri¢hie Ri¢h) is a fictional character in the Harvey Comics universe. He debuted in the comic book Little Dot #1, cover-dated September 1953, and was created by Alfred Harvey with artists Warren Kremer and/or Steve Muffatti. Dubbed "the poor little rich boy", Richie is the only child of fantastically wealthy parents and is the world's richest kid. He is so rich, his middle name is a dollar sign, $.

During Harvey Comics' heyday from 1950 to 1982, Richie was the publisher's most popular character, eventually starring in over 50 separate titles, including the long-running comics Richie Rich, Richie Rich Millions, Richie Rich Dollars and Cents, and Richie Rich Success Stories.

In 2011, Ape Entertainment began publishing a new licensed Richie Rich comic book series, taking the character in a very different, action-oriented, direction.

== Publication history ==
Although created in 1953, Richie did not have his own title until 1960. Once he did, however, he quickly became Harvey's most popular character, eventually starring in over fifty separate titles. The flagship, Richie Rich, ran 254 issues from 1960 to 1991 (with a hiatus from 1982 to 1986), followed by a second volume that ran an additional 28 issues from 1991 to 1994.

Other long-running titles were Richie Rich Millions (113 issues from 1961 to 1982), Richie Rich Dollars and Cents (109 issues from 1963 to 1982), and Richie Rich Success Stories (105 issues from 1964 to 1982).

In 1972, Harvey realized that Richie was its most lucrative character, and introduced five new Richie Rich titles: Richie Rich Bank Book, Richie Rich Diamonds, Richie Rich Jackpots, Richie Rich Money World and Richie Rich Riches. By the mid-1970s, says historian Mark Arnold, "Richie was starring in 32 different titles every 60 days... Certainly Richie was the most successful feature in American comic books in the 1970s."

Harvey ceased publishing in 1982, but started up again in 1986 under new ownership; this hiatus resulted in the cancelation of many titles. Richie (along with many of the Harvey characters) has been published only sporadically since 1994.

Writers for the Richie Rich comic books and syndicated comic strip included Sid Jacobson, Lennie Herman, Stan Kay, and Ralph Newman. Richie Rich's most famous illustrator is Warren Kremer. Other illustrators included Ernie Colón, Sid Couchey, Dom Sileo, Ben Brown, Steve Muffatti, and Joe Dennett.

== Character ==
Despite negative stereotypes associated with his incredible wealth, Richie Rich is portrayed as unfailingly kind and charitable (in fact, his moniker is "the poor little rich boy"). He lives in an expensive mansion and owns at least two of everything money can buy. Richie appears to be around seven to ten years old, with a round cherubic face and parted blond hair. His typical attire is a waistcoat, a white shirt with an Eton collar (which is obscured by a giant red bow tie), and blue shorts. He was occasionally shown attending school in his hometown of Harveyville. Other times he is classmates with Little Dot and Little Lotta in Bonnie Dell.

=== Ape Entertainment ===
For the Ape Entertainment comic book series debuting in 2011, the character was updated by emphasizing his altruistic side; "a mix of James Bond and Indiana Jones with the world's biggest bank account, Richie is an altruistic adventurer who travels the world helping the less fortunate!" The new Richie was joined by updated versions of his robot maid Irona and his butler Cadbury.

== Supporting characters ==
=== Rich family ===
- Mr. Richard Rich Sr. – Richie's father who is an industrialist (first appearance Little Dot #3)
- Mrs. Regina Rich (née Van Dough) – Richie's mother (first appearance Little Dot #1)
- Aunt Noovo Rich (a pun on the French term nouveau riche) – Richie's wealthy but very eccentric aunt who is crazy about posting signs. She has a tendency to show off her wealth. While few of Richie's aunts and uncles are clarified to be paternal or maternal, Aunt Noovo is known to be his paternal aunt making her Mr. Rich's sister.
- Uncle Titus – Although just as wealthy as the rest of the family, Uncle Titus is fanatical about saving money. He typically wears the most threadbare of clothes and makes every conceivable effort to avoid spending money, to the extent that his house is equipped with an alarm that goes off if he carelessly leaves the house with "too much" money. Some in the family have nicknamed him "Tite-wad" (as in tightwad), a name he accepts with good humor.
- Aunt Mintley – An oft-bewildered aristocrat.
- Aunt Cleo – An animal lover.
- Uncle Worry – Richie's uncle and former coach of a professional football team known for its long losing streak.
- Uncle Stormy – Another of Richie's uncles whom Richie initially mistakes for an impostor named Blackie Bludsoe in one issue.
- Uncle Spender – Another uncle of Richie who squanders his money yet often realizes a profit on his extravagance.
- Aunt Gussie – A formerly overweight aunt who slimmed down and decided to keep her new figure.
- Aunt Surprise – A jovial aunt who brings Richie elaborate toys for Christmas and is imprisoned along with Richie, his parents, Cadbury, and Casper inside a magic lamp by the Meanie Genie.
- Ezekiel Rich – Richie's nineteenth century ancestor whom Richie and Gloria met when they went back in time. He was arrested by the British as an enemy of the crown, but Richie came up with a way to save him.
- Gabby – A cousin who talks incessantly and became a salesman only to discover it was not the best line of work for him.
- Buck/Dollar – The Rich family "Dollarmatian" dog (like a Dalmatian, but with dollar signs instead of spots).

=== Van Dough family ===
- Reginald "Reggie" Van Dough Jr. – Richie's mean, spoiled, maternal cousin, known for playing constant pranks on everyone, most notably Richie and his family, which causes his father to punish him. He treats his servants shabbily, often by calling them "peasant" which in turn causes them to call him "monster" as they swiftly correct themselves and call him Master (first appearance Little Dot #2).
- Reginald Van Dough Sr. – Mrs. Rich's brother and Reggie's father. He is often angered with Reggie's non-stop pranks and often punishes him for them (usually by spanking).
- Vanessa Van Dough – Mrs. Rich's sister-in-law and Reggie's mother. She is not as quick to punish Reggie for his pranks, but she doesn't tolerate Reggie's unabashed cruelty either.
- Penny Van Dough – Reggie's baby sister. She talks only in "baby talk". The curl on her head is shaped like a dollar sign.

=== Richie's friends ===
- Gloria Glad – Richie's red haired girlfriend, notorious for her regular refusal of the many luxurious gifts Richie offers, and for her disdain for the open display of money, diamonds and other forms of wealth in Richie's household, despite his efforts to conceal it from her. Regardless, she always wins his attention in comparison to Mayda Munny (first appearance Little Dot #33). Gloria's last name, for the 1994 live-action film, was changed to Koscinski.
- Mayda Munny – Mayda Munny (whose name is a play on the phrase "made of money") is Richie's snobby ravenette wannabe-girlfriend, who never wins his attention. Like the Riches and Van Doughs, her family is fabulously wealthy. Immensely jealous of Gloria, and often angry when her plans to snare Richie's attention backfire on her. Like Reggie, Mayda is snobbish and addresses those beneath her as "peasant".
- Freckles and Pee-Wee Friendly – Richie's poor but most-prized friends (first appearance Little Dot #2), whose blue-jeaned playtime attire sharply contrasts Richie's bow-tied formal suit. Despite his working-class background, Freckles doesn't object to Richie's wealth the way Gloria does, and at times even enjoys it. Pee-Wee plays along with all of Freckles' and Richie's activities without ever saying a word. One exception to this rule occurred in Little Lotta # 108, July, 1973 in "Wet Blanket Camper."
- Billy Bellhops – A redheaded boy who worked as a bellhop at his father's hotel. Premiered in "Richie Rich and Billy Bellhops" in 1977, but was short-lived. Created by Alfred Harvey's son Russel.
- Timmy Time – An extraterrestrial boy who time-travels to present-day Earth (landing on the Riches' private beach) from the year 2019 in search of tholarine, a substance he needs for spaceship fuel back in 2019. He appeared only in Richie Rich Meets Timmy Time #1 (September 1977). Timmy Time was created by Ernie Colón as Mark Time. Colón's frustration at Mark Time being renamed Timmy Time and presented as a Richie Rich spin-off, when the original agreement had been that the character would debut in his own series, led him to abandon the project.
  - Traveler - Timmy Time's robot friend.
- Jackie Jokers – A stand-up comedian and a friend of Richie Rich.
- Jerry Jokers – The father of Jackie Jokers who often performs in comedy acts with his son.

=== Rich family employees ===
- Cadbury C. Cadbury – The Riches' butler who attends to the Rich estate. British born, Cadbury gives the image of propriety and service. When need demands however, he becomes a tough, gun-toting man of action. Cadbury is also a master hypnotist, ventriloquist and wood-carver. The 1994 live-action film gave him a modified (longer, but actually more credible) name: Herbert Arthur Runcible Cadbury.
- Irona – The Riches' robot maid and Richie's bodyguard.
- Bascomb – The Riches' chauffeur and skilled mechanic. He is also a vehicle inventor when not performing his primary duty.
- Chef Pierre – The Riches' chef extraordinaire, who is annoyed by Dollar eating his food without permission.
- Mr. Cheepers – Mr. Rich's accountant who finds constantly working with cash stressful.
- Mr. Woody – The incompetent Rich estate carpenter who is most adept at inadvertently annoying Richard Rich.
- Nurse Jenny – The Rich family nurse who was Richie's nanny when he was a baby.
- Professor Keenbean – A scientist who is the head of the Rich research and development department and Richie's personal tutor.
- Professor Mindblow – A worker at the research and development department.
- Professor Pianissimo – Richie's violin teacher for one lesson in one issue, who becomes the teacher of a promising self-taught child violinist named Louis whom Richie met in a music shop.
- Chadwick – The Riches' assistant butler.
- Minnie Mintz – One of the Riches' cooks.
- Captain Fuzzby – The captain of the Rich family's estate police.
- Marie – The Riches' French maid and Chef Pierre's girlfriend.
- Mr. Green – The Riches' gardener.
- Captain Alar – The pilot of the Riches' supersonic jet.

=== Villains ===
- Onion – A recurring villain with horrible onion-powered breath capable of knocking victims unconscious with a trademark "hashaah!"
- Dr. Robert Blemish – A recurring villain, he is an evil mad scientist and nemesis of Professor Keenbean.
- Dr. N-R-Gee – A recurring villain with the distinguishing feature of a huge red light bulb for a head, caused when scientist Phil Lament (a pun referring to a light bulb's "filament") suffered an electrical accident in his lab.
- Condor – A billionaire mastermind with his own terrorist army and the Rich Family's worst enemy. His only desire is to take over Mr. Rich's empire.

== In other media ==
=== Animated TV series ===
- Beginning in 1980, Richie Rich appeared in his own Saturday morning cartoon show, simply called Richie Rich where Richie Rich was voiced by Sparky Marcus. The show aired on The Richie Rich/Scooby-Doo Show from 1980 to 1982 and The Pac-Man/Little Rascals/Richie Rich Show from 1982 to 1984. In the animated version, Richie and his pals are somewhat older, around 12 years old. In the cartoon, Richie wears a red sweater with the letter "R" in front. Gloria was voiced by Nancy Cartwright while the other voice talents consisted of Dick Beals as Reggie Van Dough, William Callaway as Professor Keanbean and Chef Pierre, Joan Gerber as Irona and Regina Rich, Christian Hoff as Freckles and Pee-Wee, Stanley Jones as Cadbury and Mr. Rich, and Frank Welker as Dollar. While Dr. Blemish (also voiced by Frank Welker) appeared in one episode, Richie also has a recurring enemy in the Collector (voiced by Robert Ridgely).
- In 1996, the second Richie Rich animated series, also called Richie Rich aired in non-network syndication, starring Katie Leigh as the voices of Richie Rich and Irona. The series ran for 13 episodes and portrayed Richie in his "classic" tuxedo outfit. The show also features the voice talents of Jeannie Elias as Freckles, Gloria Glad, Reggie Van Dough, and Pee-Wee, René Auberjonois as Richard Rich, Chef Pierre, and Professor Keanbean, Pat Fraley as Dollar, Martin Jarvis as Cadbury and Bascomb, and Susan Silo as Regina Rich.
- Richie Rich made some appearances in the Fox cartoon The Simpsons, in the episodes "Three Men and a Comic Book", "Behind the Laughter", "Simple Simpson", and "Double, Double, Boy in Trouble", where Richie was voiced by Tress MacNeille.
- Richie Rich was parodied in the Adult Swim cartoon Robot Chicken, voiced by Seth Green. He was featured in a parody of the TV show MTV Cribs, where the character is portrayed as a playboy and a rapper and he shows his house in the same style as the MTV show.
- In 2019, Richie Rich appeared as a guest character in the DreamWorks Animation Television animated series Harvey Girls Forever!, voiced by Jack Quaid. He became a main character starting with the third season, which premiered later that year.

=== Live-action TV series ===
A half-hour comedy series titled Richie Rich debuted in 2015 on Netflix, with Jake Brennan starring as Richie Rich, along with Joshua Carlon, Jenna Ortega, Lauren Taylor, Kiff VandenHeuvel, and Brooke Wexler. However, the series is very different from the original and the rest of the original main characters were replaced, like Herbert Cadbury their butler and Professor Keenbean head of Rich's research and development, the only exception is Irona. Unlike the comic book version, Richie is not born wealthy and is a self-made trillionaire. Unlike the comics in this series, Richie has a sister, instead of being an only child, and both of them are raised by a single parent, their father. The show was executive produced by Jeff Hodsden and Tim Pollack from The Suite Life of Zack & Cody and A.N.T. Farm. It was produced by DreamWorks Animation through its former subsidiary AwesomenessTV.

=== Live-action films ===
- Richie Rich, a live-action film adaptation, was released in 1994, with Macaulay Culkin as the titular character, Edward Herrmann as Richard Rich, Christine Ebersole as Regina Rich, Jonathan Hyde as Cadbury, Michael McShane as Professor Keanbean, John Larroquette as the evil Laurence Van Dough, and Frank Welker providing special vocal effects. It was produced by Silver Pictures and Davis Entertainment and released by Warner Bros. under its Family Entertainment label.
- A live-action sequel titled Richie Rich's Christmas Wish followed in 1998. This film starred David Gallagher as the titular character, Martin Mull as Richard Rich, Lesley Ann Warren as Regina Rich, Keene Curtis as Cadbury, Don McLeod as Irona, Michelle Trachtenberg as Gloria, Eugene Levy as Professor Keanbean, and Jake Richardson as Reggie Van Dough.

=== Music ===
- Richie Rich is mentioned in the Dance Hall Crashers song “Old and Grey” as having been, along with Scooby-Doo, one of co-vocalist Elyse Rogers' favorite television programs to watch after school as a child (this may be referring to The Richie Rich/Scooby-Doo Show).

=== Advertisements ===
In 2012, Richie Rich was shown in MetLife's "Everyone" commercial during Super Bowl XLVI.

== Titles published ==
Published by Harvey Comics unless otherwise noted

- Richie Rich
  - vol. 1 (Nov. 1960 – Jan. 1991)—254 issues
  - vol. 2 (Mar. 1991 – Nov. 1994)—28 issues
- Richie Rich Adventure Digest (May. 1992-Sep.1994)―7 issues
- Richie Rich and... (Oct. 1987 – May 1990)—11 issues; each issue had a different guest star whose name became a part of the title for that issue only
- Richie Rich and Billy Bellhops (Oct. 1977)―1 issue
- Richie Rich and Cadbury (Oct. 1977 – Jan. 1991)—29 issues
- Richie Rich and Casper (Aug. 1974 – Sept. 1982)—45 issues
- Richie Rich and Casper in 3-D
- Richie Rich and Dollar (Sept. 1977 – Aug. 1982)—24 issues
- Richie Rich and Little Dot
- Richie Rich and Gloria (Sept. 1977 – Sept. 1982)—25 issues
- Richie Rich and His Girlfriends (Apr. 1979 – Dec. 1982)—16 issues
- Richie Rich and Jackie Jokers (Nov. 1973 – Dec. 1982)—48 issues
- Richie Rich and New Kids on the Block (Feb. 1991-June. 1991)―3 issues
- Richie Rich and Professor Keenbean (Sep. 1990-Nov 1990)—2 issues
- Richie Rich and His Mean Cousin Reggie (Apr. 1979-Jan. 1980)―3 issues
- Richie Rich Meets Timmy Time (Sep. 1977)―1 issue
- Richie Rich Bank Book (Oct. 1972 – Sept. 1982)—59 issues
- Richie Rich Best of the Years Magazine (Oct. 1977-June 1980)―6 issues
- Richie Rich Big Book
- Richie Rich Big Bucks (Apr. 1991-July 1992)―8 issues
- Richie Rich Billions (Oct. 1974 – Oct. 1982)—48 issues
- Richie Rich Cash (Sept. 1974 – Aug. 1982)—47 issues
- Richie Rich and Cash Money
- Richie Rich, Casper, and Wendy National League (June. 1976)―1 issue
- Richie Rich Diamonds (Aug. 1972 – Aug. 1982)—59 issues
- Richie Rich Digest (Oct. 1986 – Oct. 1994)—42 issues
- Richie Rich Digest Stories (Oct. 1977 – Oct. 1982)—17 issues
- Richie Rich Digest Winners (Dec. 1977 – Sept. 1982)—16 issues
- Richie Rich Dollars and Cents (Aug. 1963 – Aug. 1982)—109 issues
- Richie Rich Fortunes (Sept. 1971 – July 1982)—63 issues
- Richie Rich Gems (Sept. 1974 – Sept. 1982)—43 issues
- Richie Rich Giant Size (Oct 1992-Oct 1993)―4 issues
- Richie Rich Gold and Silver (Sept. 1975 – Oct. 1982)—42 issues
- Richie Rich Gold Nuggets Digest (Dec. 1990-June 1991)―4 issues
- Richie Rich Holiday Digest
- Richie Rich Inventions (Oct. 1977 – Oct. 1982)—26 issues
- Richie Rich Jackpots (Oct. 1972 – Aug. 1982)—58 issues
- Richie Rich Million Dollar Digest
- Richie Rich Millions (Sept. 1961 – Oct. 1982)—113 issues
- Richie Rich Money World (Sept. 1972 – Sept. 1982)—59 issues
- Richie Rich Money World Digest
- Richie Rich Movie Adaptation
- Richie Rich Profits (Oct. 1974 – Sept. 1982)—47 issues
- Richie Rich Relics
- Richie Rich Riches (July 1972 – Aug. 1982)—59 issues
- Richie Rich Success Stories (Nov. 1964 – Sept. 1982)—105 issues
- Richie Rich Summer Bonanza
- Richie Rich Treasure Chest Digest
- Richie Rich Vacation Digest
- Richie Rich Vacation Digest Magazine
- Richie Rich Vacation Digest '93 Magazine
- Richie Rich Vaults of Mystery (Nov. 1974 – Sept. 1982)—47 issues
- Richie Rich Zillionz (Oct. 1976 – Sept. 1982)—33 issues
- SupeRichie (Oct. 1976 - Jan. 1979)—18 issues

== See also ==
- Lord Snooty (in The Beano UK Comics)
- Rollo (in Nancy)
- Royal Roy, (a Star Comics answer to Richie Rich)
- Wilbur Van Snobbe (in Little Lulu)
