= Matthew Churchill =

British theatre producer

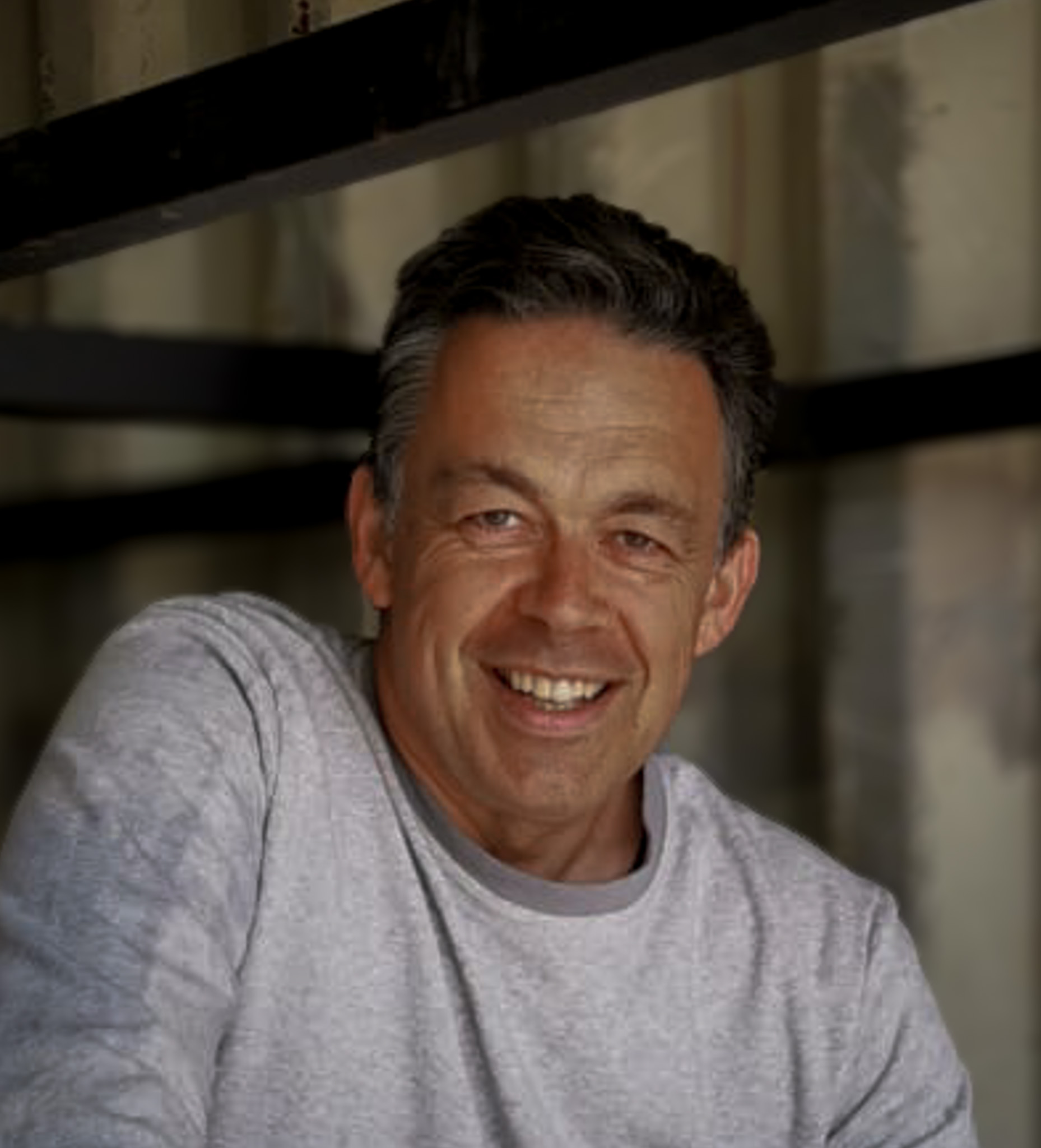
- Born: 28 August 1966 (age 60); Wokingham, Berkshire, England
- Occupation: Theatrical producer
- Spouse: Teresa Hoskyns (m. 2008–present)
- Writing career
- Notable work: Peter Pan (Three Sixty Entertainment)

Matthew Churchill FRSA (born 28 August 1966), is a producer of theatre and live events. His productions have combined storytelling, visual narrative and environments in both the UK and US.

== Career ==
Matthew Churchill co-founded "Three Sixty Entertainment" with Charlie Burnell in 2009. He was CEO of "Three Sixty Entertainment" until 2011. He was the founding producer of Mamaloucos whose 2002 production of Aristophanes' The Birds (play) was a best selling show at the Royal National Theatre in the UK. His company also designed the tented theatre for the National Theatre's production of Oh, What a Lovely War! and toured the production throughout the UK in 1998; in 2013 his company designed and managed a new temporary venue for Chichester Festival Theatre during their refurbishment.

== Productions ==
During his time at "Three Sixty Entertainment" Churchill conceived and produced a version of Peter Pan that combined 360 degree surround CGI with live theatre. The production which first opened in London, was successful locally and internationally. The story of the founding of "Three Sixty Entertainment", its first year of business and the creation of Peter Pan was the subject of a chapter in the British business book, How they started in tough times. The book describes how Peter Pan became the second largest-selling show in London's West End during the summer of 2009. "Three Sixty Entertainment" grossed just under £7.5 million from Peter Pan during its 22 weeks in the UK. Approximately 200000 people attended Peter Pan during that season. Altogether, Peter Pan has been seen by more than 1,000,000 people in the UK and USA.

== Documentaries ==
Churchill was featured in documentaries in the USA. Included are the regional Emmy nominated "KGO" documentary "Inside Peter Pan 360"; the one hour "KOCE" documentary Inside Neverland: the Making of Peter Pan; and the "CBS5" documentary Eye On The Bay, Peter Pan.

== Fellowships ==
Churchill is a fellow of the "Royal Society of Arts"

== Personal life ==
Churchill is married to Dr. Teresa Hoskyns. Hoskyns is an architect and academic specialising in the field of public space. She is the granddaughter of Sir Edwyn Hoskyns, 13th Baronet and Baron Nicholas Kaldor.

== Awards ==
Churchill was a recipient of the "2009 Startup of the Year Award".
