= Peter Pan (Three Sixty Entertainment) =

Peter Pan is a stage production by Three Sixty Entertainment, of J. M. Barrie's 1904 play. It debuted as Peter Pan in Kensington Gardens in 2009, staged in Kensington Gardens of London, where Barrie originally conceived the character of Peter Pan. (Despite the title when presented in Kensington Gardens, the production's story is the famous 1904 play featuring Wendy Darling, not the 1906 book recounting Peter Pan's infancy, titled Peter Pan in Kensington Gardens.)

A distinguishing feature of the production is its in-the-round staging, in a purpose-built theatre pavilion designed by Teresa Hoskyns that uses 360 degree surround video projections. The production has been seen by more than 700,000 people in both the UK and USA. After London, the production opened in the US in May 2010 and has since toured in San Francisco, Orange County, Atlanta, Chicago, and Boston.

The original London cast included Ciaran Kellgren as Peter, Abby Ford as Wendy, and Jonathan Hyde as Captain Hook. It was directed by Ben Harrison. The script is adapted by Tanya Ronder from the Barrie story, with music composed by Benjamin Wallfisch, choreography by Fleur Darkin, sound design by Gregory Clarke, lighting design by Mark Henderson, fight direction by Nicholas Hall, puppetry design by Sue Buckmaster, costume design by Sarah Wakida, and illusions by Paul Kieve. It was conceived and produced by Charlie Burnell and Mat Churchill.
