= Little Lotta =

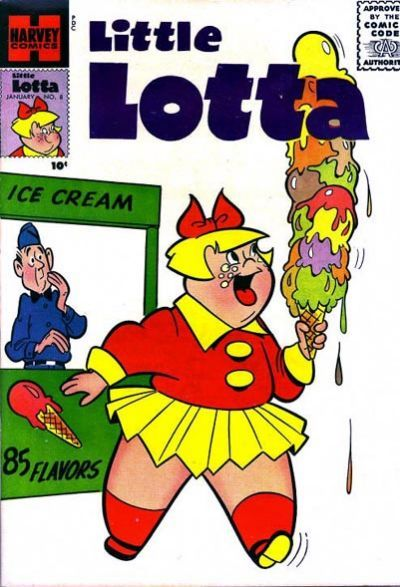
- Cover of Little Lotta #8, drawn by Warren Kremer.

Publication information
- Publisher: Harvey Comics
- First appearance: Little Dot #1 September 1953
- Voiced by: Lauren Lapkus

In-story information
- Full name: Lotta Plump
- Species: Human
- Team affiliations: Little Dot, Gerald (boyfriend)
- Abilities: super strength, super appetite

Little Lotta is a fictional character published by Harvey Comics from 1953 to 1972, and then sporadically until 1993. A contemporary of Little Audrey, Little Dot and Wendy the Good Little Witch, she was one of Harvey's best-known female characters during the 1960s and featured in many of the company's child-friendly comedy titles. Like many of Harvey's comic headliners, Lotta was notable for a quirky defining characteristic - in this case, an insatiable appetite giving rise to superhuman strength.

Lotta stories were penned by Warren Kremer and Howard Post, and for the majority of the years that she appeared in comics, she was drawn by Sid Couchey and Dom Sileo.

== Publication history ==
Lotta Plump first appeared in 1953 as a back-page feature in Little Dot (where she debuted with Harvey's most successful property, Richie Rich). From the outset, Lotta's large appetite was a running gag employed in virtually every story and featured prominently on the covers of her two comic titles, Little Lotta (1955-1972, 1974–76; 1992-1993) and Little Lotta in Foodland (1963-1972). A typical cover scene showed Lotta devouring a meal of gigantic proportions or performing some feat of tremendous strength.

Lotta began making regular crossovers with Dot and Audrey in the early 1960s, frequently combining their peculiar foibles to either cause trouble or save the day. Guest appearances with Richie Rich and Gloria took place during the 1970s, when she and the other "Harvey Girls" were featured in Richie Rich and his Girlfriends.

Little Lotta was published from 1955 to 1976, when Harvey's Richie Rich explosion took over. Lotta's book was canceled (along with Little Audrey, Little Dot, and Wendy), after 120 issues (issue #121 was advertised, but never issued). Lotta remained a supporting feature in the back of Richie Rich books until Harvey's demise in 1982. Upon Harvey's return in 1986, a proposed idea to have Lotta return as the drummer of a rock band with Little Audrey on guitar and Little Dot on vocals was shelved. So was an idea of having the three appear as teenagers and have adventures similar to Archie.

== Character ==
Far from being the "unpopular fat kid" stereotype represented in other popular media (such as her contemporary Tubby in Little Lulu) Lotta was depicted as friendly, kind-hearted and always ready to use her strength for what she deemed as good. She suffers from bullying, but any tormentors regret provoking her wrath. In a sense, Lotta's storylines fulfill two very common childhood fantasies: the satisfaction of visceral desires (eating everything in sight) and freedom through physical power. Little Lotta maintains a positive attitude about herself.

Lotta lives in the fictional town of Bonnie Dell, a "timeless" picket-fence suburb existing in the same world as several other Harvey characters (although in many stories it is simply called Harveyville).

She has a boyfriend named Gerald, who in many ways is Lotta's opposite. He is a shy, diminutive boy with glasses, and he is not very strong. Lotta and Gerald have many adventures together and frequently dress up to imitate their favorite comic book hero, Flying Man. When dressed up, Lotta becomes "Leaping Lotta". In several stories, Lotta expressed an ambition to become a police officer even though passing the physical was an impossibility.

== In popular culture ==
- A Little Lotta comic book was used as a plot device on Everybody Loves Raymond in 2000 (season 4, episode 17). Paul Reubens, as the comic book store owner says of Little Lotta, "although she's morbidly obese, she still finds happiness."
- Lotta appears as a character in Baby Huey's Great Easter Adventure.
- Little Lotta was referenced in the animated TV series Family Guy in season 15 episode 4, "Inside Family Guy", in which Peter dresses up as Little Lotta to get paid having his picture taken pictures with tourists on the Hollywood Walk of Fame.
- Little Lotta is one of the three main characters in the series Harvey Street Kids and is voiced by Lauren Lapkus. Gerald also appears in the series. The show explains that, prior to a growth spurt, Lotta was extremely small, but grew to be taller than the other children in the neighborhood. This version still possesses super-strength and is a lover of animals. She is also Jewish in this version as the fourth season episode "Miracle on Harvey Street" shows Lotta celebrating Hanukkah.
