= Keene Curtis =

American actor (1923–2002)

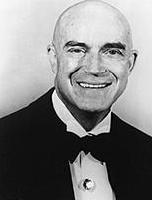
- Born: Keene Holbrook Curtis; February 15, 1923; Salt Lake City, Utah, U.S.
- Died: October 13, 2002 (aged 79); Bountiful, Utah, U.S.
- Education: University of Utah
- Occupation: Actor
- Years active: 1948–1998

Keene Holbrook Curtis (February 15, 1923 – October 13, 2002) was an American character actor.

== Early life ==
Curtis was born in Salt Lake City, Utah to Polley Francella (née Holbrook), a teacher, and Ira Charles Curtis, a railway and civil-service employee. He attended Davis High School in Kaysville, Utah, then enlisted in the U.S. Navy and served three years in the Pacific Theater during World War II. After the war, he attended the University of Utah, where he earned a bachelor's degree. In 1943, he was recognized by the Theta Alpha Phi national honorary dramatic society as the university's outstanding actor.

== Film ==
Curtis made his film debut in Orson Welles' 1948 adaptation of Macbeth. His additional film credits include American Hot Wax, Rabbit Test, The Buddy System, I.Q., Heaven Can Wait, Sliver and Richie Rich's Christmas Wish.

== Theater ==
Curtis' theatrical career began in 1949 as an assistant stage manager for the Martha Graham Dance Company before working on Broadway productions. His first appearance as a performer was in a 1965 revival of You Can't Take It with You. In 1971, he won the Tony Award for Best Featured Actor in a Musical for The Rothschilds. His additional Broadway credits include The Cherry Orchard, A Patriot for Me, Via Galactica, Annie, Night Watch and La Cage aux Folles. He was a member of the Stratford Festival of Canada acting company in 1981, playing Sir George Thunder in Wild Oats.

== Television ==
Curtis played a recurring role as John Allen Hill, the owner of Melville's Restaurant on Cheers, and as a wealthy banker on the short-lived Bea Arthur vehicle Amanda's. His many television credits include The Magician as quirky columnist Max Pomeroy opposite Bill Bixby, Gypsy starring Bette Midler and two appearances on Three's Company.

- Dark Shadows (1970) — Judah Zachary (voice)
- M*A*S*H (1974) — Colonel Wortman
- Hawaii Five-O (1974–1975) — Professor Burke / Vincent Gordon
- Karen (1975) — Bates
- Sanford and Son (1975) — Doctor Goodman
- Baretta (1975) — Eric Metz
- Ellery Queen (1975) — Edgar Manning
- The Jeffersons (1976) — Judge John Markell
- Wonder Woman (1976) — Mueller
- Quincy, M.E. (1977) — Arthur Forsythe
- Logan's Run (1977) — Draco
- The San Pedro Beach Bums (1977) — Rushton
- Lou Grant (1978–1981) — Wild Bill / Doctor at hospital / Coach Diehl
- Eight Is Enough (1979) — Reverend Mayberry
- Three's Company (1979–1981) — Andrew Gainer / Dr. Todson
- One in a Million (1980) — Mr. Cushing
- Hart to Hart (1981–1982) — Alden Kendra / Frank Kruger
- Private Benjamin (1982) — Maj. Drell
- Trapper John, M.D. (1982) — Mr. Bayard
- Benson (1982) — J.D. Cannon season 4 episodes 1 & 2
- Modesty Blaise (1982, TV Movie) — Sir Gerald Tarrant
- The Smurfs (1982–1989) — Lord Balthazar (voice)
- Knight Rider (1983) — Griffin
- Matt Houston (1983) — Bruno
- Partners in Crime (1983)
- The Wizard (1987) — Van Slyke
- Night Court (1988) — Mr. Klimmer
- Newhart (1989) — Merritt White
- Cheers (1990–1993) — John Allen Hill
- The Pirates of Dark Water (1991) — Garen (voice)
- Beverly Hills, 90210 (1991) — Santa Claus / Bum at Peach / Pilot Pit
- Murder, She Wrote (1993) — Jerome Mueller
- Full House (1994) — Lou Bond
- ER (1995) — Gilbert McCabe
- Coach (1995) — David Curtis
- Hope and Gloria (1995) — Dr. Green
- Ned & Stacey (1995) — Brent Nicholson
- Caroline in the City (1996) — Mr. Davies
- Star Trek: Voyager (1996) — Old Man #2
- Brotherly Love (1996) — Mr. Hangarter
- Lois & Clark: The New Adventures of Superman (1996) — Willard B. Caldwell
- The Drew Carey Show (1996–1997) — Reverend Lindemann / Pastor Lindemann
- Stargate SG-1 (1997) — Ernest Littlefield
- Touched by an Angel (1997) — Norman Delmonico
- Ally McBeal (1997) — Judge Johnson Hawk
- Men Behaving Badly (1997) — Potter Stevens
- Sunset Beach (1997–1998) — Quint (uncredited)
- Party of Five (1998) — Mr. Bancroft
- The Pretender (1998) — Mr. Fenigor

== Animation ==
For the animated series SWAT Kats: The Radical Squadron, Curtis voiced the character of the Pastmaster. He also provided the voice of Grand Moff Tarkin for the radio adaptation of Star Wars Episode IV: A New Hope as well as that of Lord Balthazar on The Smurfs from 1981 to 1989.

Curtis also lent his voice to cartoon shows including The Little Mermaid, The Dukes, The Scooby & Scrappy-Doo/Puppy Hour, Bill and Ted's Excellent Adventures, Trollkins, The Adventures of Don Coyote and Sancho Panda, The Greatest Adventure: Stories from the Bible, Denver, the Last Dinosaur, The Snorks, The Jetsons, Space Stars, Adventures from the Book of Virtues, The Herculoids, Fantastic Max, Paddington Bear, The Centurions, Kissyfur, Mother Goose and Grimm, The Hot Rod Dogs and Cool Car Cats and Bonkers.

== Personal life ==
Curtis was a member of the Church of Jesus Christ of Latter-day Saints.

== Death ==
Curtis died from complications from Alzheimer's disease at a Bountiful, Utah nursing home at the age of 79 and was buried at Bountiful Memorial Park. Curtis never married and had no children.
