= David Gallagher =

American actor and model (born 1985)

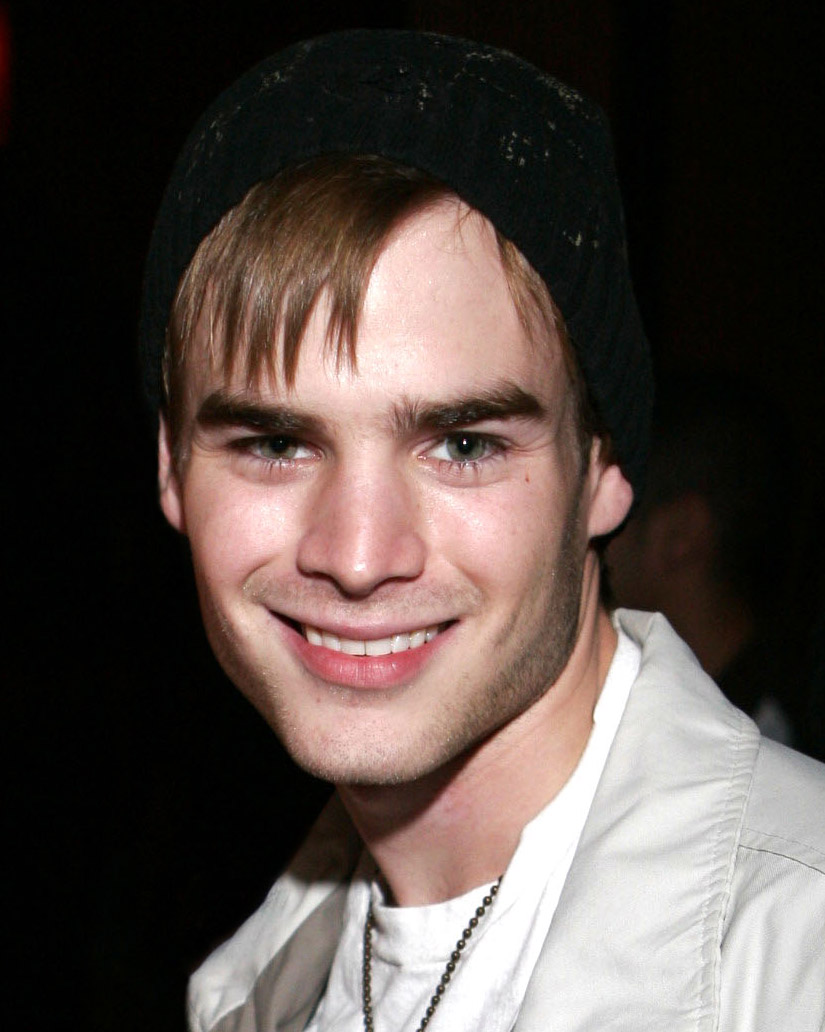
- Gallagher in 2007
- Born: February 9, 1985 (age 41); New York City, U.S.
- Occupations: Actor; model
- Years active: 1987–present
- Partner: Kevin Williams (m) 2021
- Children: 2

David Lee Gallagher (born February 9, 1985) is an American actor and former model. He began his career as a child actor and model at the age of two, and is known for his roles as Mikey Ubriacco in Look Who's Talking Now, Simon Camden in 7th Heaven, Kevin Harper in Angels in the Endzone, Richie Rich in Richie Rich's Christmas Wish, and Riku in the Kingdom Hearts series. Throughout his career, he has been a five-time Young Artist Award nominee and Teen Choice Award winner.

== Early life ==
Gallagher was born in New York City to Elena Gallagher (née Lopez) and Darren James Gallagher. After they separated when he was a baby, his mother remarried Vincent Casey. Gallagher is of Cuban descent on his mother's side and Irish descent on his father's side. He has four younger siblings, two brothers and two sisters. After his brother Killian was diagnosed with autism at the age of three, he became a supporter and spokesperson for Autism Speaks.

He graduated from Chaminade College Preparatory School (California) in 2003 and enrolled at the University of Southern California, where he majored in film and television studies, graduating in May 2007.

== Career ==
Gallagher began acting at the age of two, modeling for print advertorials in and around New York City, which eventually led to commercial work as an actor. As a toddler, he appeared in several television commercials for products such as Tyson Foods and Fisher-Price. When he was eight years old, he had a recurring role on the soap opera Loving.

Gallagher made his film debut in 1993 portraying Mikey Ubriacco in the film Look Who's Talking Now!, and in 1995 was part of a production of A Christmas Carol on Broadway. He also starred in several television films, including Bermuda Triangle.

In 1996, Gallagher co-starred with John Travolta in the film Phenomenon as Al Pennamin. Later that year, he was cast as Simon Camden in 7th Heaven, which aired for eleven seasons, making it the longest-running family drama on television, and became the highest-rated series on The WB.

During hiatuses from filming, he appeared in several films, including the direct-to-video Richie Rich's Christmas Wish and Little Secrets with Evan Rachel Wood. In 2003, during 7th Heaven's eighth season, Gallagher left the show to attend college full-time. However, he returned to the series part-time during the ninth season and the tenth season, which was thought to be the final season. In late 2006, The CW renewed 7th Heaven for an eleventh season, but Gallagher chose not to renew his contract. In 2005, Gallagher starred in and co-produced a low-budget adaptation of The Picture of Dorian Gray.

After leaving 7th Heaven, he had several roles, including serial killer Buck Winters in Numb3rs, a murder suspect in the CSI: Miami episode "Dangerous Son", Mark in Boogeyman 2, Paul Shapiro in Saving Grace, Ryan Stephenson in Bones, Jeff Ellis in Without a Trace, Seiji Amasawa in the English dub of Whisper of the Heart, and Kevin Mather in The Deep End episode "An Innocent Man". In March 2012, it was announced that Gallagher would be co-starring with Jake Weber in Scared of the Dark, directed by Takashi Shimizu. Since 2002, Gallagher has been the voice of Riku in the video game series Kingdom Hearts.

In April 2024, it was announced that Gallagher and his former co-stars, Beverley Mitchell and Mackenzie Rosman, would co-host the 7th Heaven rewatch podcast Catching up with the Camdens!.

== Personal life ==
Gallagher dated actress Megan Fox from January 2003 to February 2004. He has two children.

== Filmography ==
=== Film ===
| Year | Title | Role | Notes | Ref. |
|---|---|---|---|---|
| 1993 | Look Who's Talking Now | Michael "Mikey" Ubriacco | | |
| 1996 | Bermuda Triangle | Sam | | |
| 1996 | Phenomenon | Albert "Al" Pennamin | | |
| 1998 | Richie Rich's Christmas Wish | Richie Rich | Video | |
| 2001 | Little Secrets | David | | |
| 2003 | Kart Racer | Scott McKenna | | |
| 2005 | The Quiet | Brian | | |
| 2006 | Whisper of the Heart | Seiji Amasawa (voice) | English dub | |
| 2007 | The Picture of Dorian Gray | Dorian Gray | Also co-producer | |
| 2007 | Freakin' Zombies, Man! | Duke | Video short | |
| 2007 | Boogeyman 2 | Mark Sexton | | |
| 2011 | Super 8 | Donny | | |
| 2011 | Trophy Kids | Reid Davis | | |
| 2013 | Scared of the Dark | Adam | | |

=== Television ===
| Year | Title | Role | Notes | Ref. |
|---|---|---|---|---|
| 1995 | It Was Him or Us | Stevie Pomeroy | Television film | |
| 1996 | Summer of Fear | Zack Marshall | Television film | |
| 1996–2006 | 7th Heaven | Simon Camden | Main role; seasons 1-7 & 10, recurring; seasons 8 & 9 | |
| 1997 | Angels in the Endzone | Kevin Harper | Television film | |
| 1997 | Walker, Texas Ranger | Chad Morgan | Episode: "Brainchild" | |
| 1999–2002 | Rocket Power | Oliver Van Rossum (voice) | 10 episodes | |
| 1999 | The Wild Thornberrys | Ben (voice) | 2 episodes | |
| 2000 | The New Adventures of Spin and Marty: Suspect Behavior | Marty Markham | Television film | |
| 2006–2009 | Numb3rs | Buck Winters | 3 episodes | |
| 2007 | CSI: Miami | Rick Bates | Episode: "Dangerous Son" | |
| 2008 | Saving Grace | Paul Shapiro | Episode: "A Survivor Lives Here" | |
| 2008 | Bones | Ryan Stephenson | Episode: "The He in the She" | |
| 2008 | Without a Trace | Jeff Ellis | Episode: "Push Comes to Shove" | |
| 2009 | Smallville | Zan | Episode: "Idol" | |
| 2010 | The Deep End | Kevin Mather | Episode: "An Innocent Man" | |
| 2011 | The Vampire Diaries | Ray Sutton | 2 episodes | |
| 2012 | Criminal Minds | Matt Moore | Episode: "The Wheels on the Bus" | |
| 2012 | CSI: Crime Scene Investigation | Adam Kemp | Episode: "Tressed To Kill" | |
| 2012 | CSI: NY | Marty Bosch | Episode: "Clean Sweep" | |
| 2013 | Second Generation Wayans | Jeremy Silverman | | |
| 2014 | In Your Eyes | Lyle Soames | Television film | |
| 2017 | Born and Missing | Brian | Television film | |
| 2020 | S.W.A.T. | Sawyer | Episode: "Bad Cop" | |

=== Video games ===
| Year | Title | Role | Notes | Ref. |
|---|---|---|---|---|
| 2002 | Kingdom Hearts | Riku | | |
| 2002 | Rocket Power: Beach Bandits | Oliver Van Rossum | | |
| 2004 | Kingdom Hearts: Chain of Memories | Riku, Riku Replica | Archive audio for Riku Replica | |
| 2006 | Kingdom Hearts II | Riku | | |
| 2007 | Kingdom Hearts II Final Mix | Riku | Archive audio | |
| 2008 | Kingdom Hearts Re:Chain of Memories | Riku, Riku Replica | | |
| 2009 | Kingdom Hearts 358/2 Days | Riku | | |
| 2010 | Kingdom Hearts Birth by Sleep | Riku | | |
| 2011 | Kingdom Hearts Re:coded | Riku | | |
| 2012 | Kingdom Hearts 3D: Dream Drop Distance | Riku | | |
| 2013 | Kingdom Hearts HD 1.5 Remix | Riku, Riku Replica | New and Archived footage for Riku & Riku Replica | |
| 2014 | Kingdom Hearts HD 2.5 Remix | Riku | Archive audio | |
| 2017 | Kingdom Hearts 0.2: Birth by Sleep – A Fragmentary Passage | Riku | | |
| 2019 | Kingdom Hearts III | Riku, Riku Replica | | |
| 2020 | Kingdom Hearts: Melody of Memory | Riku | | |
| 2026 | Kingdom Hearts Collection [I~III] | Riku | Archive audio | |
| 2027 | Kingdom Hearts IV | Riku | | |

== Awards and nominations ==
=== Award ===
- 2003: Teen Choice Awards 2003: Choice TV Actor: Action/Drama.

=== Nominations ===
- 1994: Young Artist Awards 1992–1993: Best Youth Actor Under 10 in a Motion Picture.
- 1997: Young Artist Awards 1995–1996: Best Performance in a TV Drama Series: Young Actor.
- 1998: Young Artist Awards 1996–1997: Best Performance in a TV Drama Series: Leading Young Actor.
- 1999: Young Artist Awards 1997–1998: Best Performance in a TV Series: Young Ensemble.
- 2002: Young Artist Awards 2000–2001: Best Performance in a TV Drama Series: Leading Young Actor.
- 2004: Teen Choice Awards 2004: Choice TV Actor: Action/Drama.
