= Alfred Harvey =

American comic book publisher (1913–1994)

- Born: October 6, 1913 Brooklyn, New York, U.S.
- Died: July 4, 1994 (aged 80) New Rochelle, New York, U.S.
- Areas: Writer, Publisher
- Notable works: Harvey Comics; Little Dot; Richie Rich

Alfred Harvey (born Alfred Harvey Wiernikoff; October 6, 1913 – July 4, 1994), was the founder of comic book publisher Harvey Comics and the creator of the comic book characters Little Dot, Richie Rich, and Adam Awards. He was born to Russian Jewish immigrants in Brooklyn, New York. Alfred Harvey's company, Harvey World Famous Comics, produced comic books and cartoons featuring Wendy the Good Little Witch, Spooky the Tuff Little Ghost, Casper the Friendly Ghost, Baby Huey, Little Audrey, and Little Dot. It also published Sad Sack, the military comic strip, which was created by George Baker.

== Career ==
=== Early career ===
Beginning his career at the age of 15 drawing advertising cartoons each week for 5 dollars, he then took a job at Fox Comics in the winter of 1939 with Joe Simon and Jack Kirby, and eventually became managing editor. He then quit in 1940, moving to the NYAD advertising agency. He then joined World War II in 1941 at The Pentagon with Kirby, and he noted Harvey as an "eager type". Harvey supervised War Victory Comics, the first government-sponsored comic book.

=== Harvey Comics ===
In 1940, he was tired of working for the company and soon seized control of Leo Greenwald's comic book company, which was inherited from Worth Carnahan, and then evolved into his own company first called Alfred Harvey Publications, then Family Comics, then Home Comics. He served as president, eventually employing his twin brother Leon as vice president and editor, and his older brother Robert as vice president and business manager. The three brothers renamed their company, again, to Harvey Comics Publications, Inc. Harvey released their first comic series in 1941 called Pocket Comics, which introduced their star and acrobat superhero heroine, The Black Cat. As the decade progressed, superheroes began to go out of style, and by the end of the decade, their superheroes completely faded out and they introduced their Comics Hits Revival series. Due to the Comic Code, the comics were aimed towards children. Harvey formed a working relationship with Paramount Pictures, licensing characters from cartoons produced by Famous Studios, with the comics' quality and popularity greatly surpassing that of the cartoons. Harvey later bought Famous Studios' original properties from Paramount Pictures.

Alfred Harvey retired in 1982, his company was sold to HMH Communications and in 1989 it was renamed to Harvey Comics Entertainment. He was in a coma since 1989 and died at age 80 on July 4, 1994, from heart failure, according to his sons Alan and Russell at a New Rochelle Hospital, and is buried in Mount Hope Cemetery in Hastings-on-Hudson, New York.

== Personal life ==
He has four surviving sons and a daughter: Alan, who was born in Larchmont, Russell, who was born in Manhattan, Adam, who was born in Mamaroneck, Eric who was born in Manhattan, NY and Susan Bush, who was born in Brooklyn. He had two wives. His second wife, Elsa Victoria Lorne Harvey, died in March 1994.
