= Jonathan Hyde =

Australian actor (born 1948)

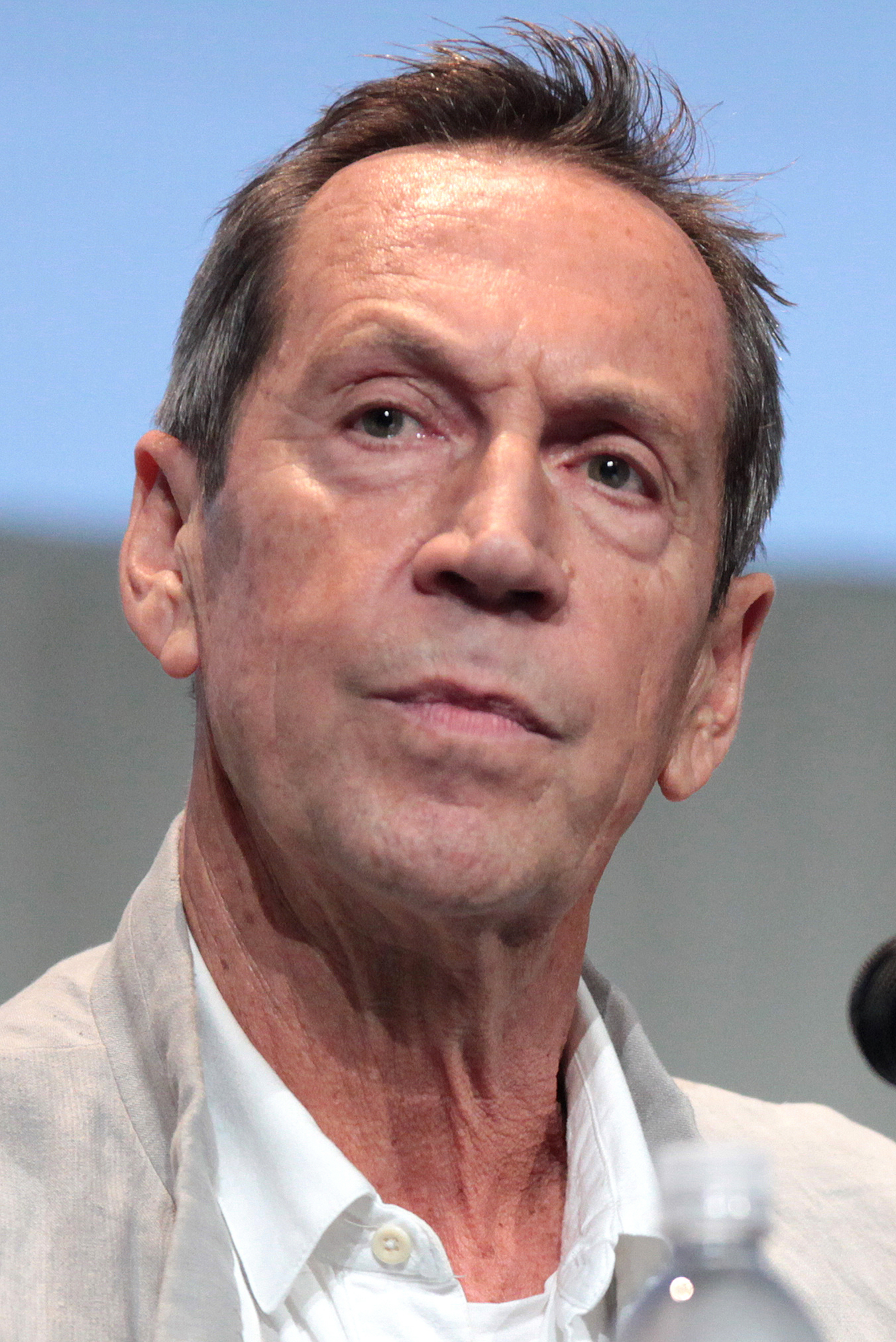
- Hyde at the 2015 San Diego Comic-Con
- Born: Jonathan Stephen Geoffrey King; 21 May 1948 (age 78); Brisbane, Queensland, Australia
- Occupation: Actor
- Years active: 1972–present
- Spouse: Isobel Buchanan (m. 1980)
- Children: 2, including Georgia King
- Website: www.jonathanhyde.net

Jonathan Stephen Geoffrey King (born 21 May 1948), known professionally as Jonathan Hyde, is an Australian-British actor. He portrayed Herbert Arthur Runcible Cadbury in the comedy film Richie Rich (1994), Samuel Parrish and Van Pelt in the fantasy adventure film Jumanji (1995), J. Bruce Ismay in the epic romantic film Titanic (1997), Culverton Smith in The Memoirs of Sherlock Holmes (1994), Warren Westridge in creature feature film Anaconda (1997), Dr. Allen Chamberlain in the adventure horror film The Mummy (1999), and Eldritch Palmer in the FX TV series The Strain (2014–2017). Although an Australian citizen, he has mostly lived in the United Kingdom since 1969, having left Australia to pursue an acting career.

== Early life ==
Hyde was born in Brisbane, Queensland, to Stephen Geoffrey King, solicitor, and Adele Seranette Cameron Donaldson. Hyde's interest in law took him to university to study the subject but his passion for performing and the theatre led him to pursue a career in acting. Leaving for London in 1969, he was awarded a place at the Royal Academy of Dramatic Art (RADA) and won the Bancroft Gold Medal for excellence in his graduating year of 1972. In a 2007 interview with The Age, Hyde said he did not make a conscious decision to lose his Australian accent after moving to Britain, and that it still "comes and goes."

== Career ==
Hyde is a member of the Royal Shakespeare Company. Among other roles, he played Ferdinand in a 1985 production of John Webster's The Duchess of Malfi. He was an original cast member of Not the Nine O'Clock News, the first series of which was pulled from broadcast because of the General Election of 1979. The 1990s produced many of Hyde's best known film roles such as Cadbury, the loyal butler in Richie Rich, Sam Parrish/Van Pelt, the hunter in Jumanji, J. Bruce Ismay, the arrogant managing director of the White Star Line in Titanic, and Egyptologist Allen Chamberlain in The Mummy. He has been in numerous films including The Contract, The Curse of King Tut's Tomb, Land of the Blind, The Tailor of Panama, Sherlock Holmes and the Case of the Silk Stocking, Eisenstein and Anaconda.

He starred in the 1989 BBC drama series Shadow of the Noose in which he played the lead barrister Edward Marshall Hall. Incidentally, Isobel Buchanan sang the theme song for the series He has also appeared in several television mysteries, including The Adventures of Sherlock Holmes starring Jeremy Brett in which Hyde played Culverton Smith and Midsomer Murders as Frank Smythe-Webster.

In 2007, Hyde played Dr. Dorn in Chekhov's The Seagull and the Earl of Kent in King Lear for the Royal Shakespeare Company in a repertory company that included Ian McKellen, Frances Barber, Romola Garai, William Gaunt and Sylvester McCoy. Both plays toured together internationally, before taking up residence in the New London Theatre. The final performance was on 12 January 2008. He reprised his role of Kent in the 2008 television film of King Lear.

In the final series of BBC's popular series Spooks, Hyde played Ilya Gavrik, a Russian Minister.

Hyde appeared as Lionel Logue, the King's speech therapist, in the West End production of The King's Speech at Wyndham's Theatre.

From 2014 to 2017, he starred as Eldritch Palmer in the FX TV series The Strain.

In 2019, he starred as Beau in Gently Down The Stream at London's Park Theatre, and himself earned an Olivier Award Nomination: Outstanding Achievement in an Affiliate Theatre - Jonathan Hyde.

== Personal life ==
Hyde married the Scottish operatic soprano Isobel Buchanan in 1980. They have two daughters, one of whom is the Scottish actress Georgia King. The other is actress Willa King who now lives in Sydney, Australia.

== Filmography ==
=== Film ===
Year	Title	Role	Notes	Ref.
1986	Caravaggio	Baglione		
1993	Being Human	Francisco		
1993	Deadly Advice	George Joseph Smith		
1994	Richie Rich	Herbert Arthur Runcible Cadbury		
1995	Jumanji	Samuel Parrish / Van Pelt		
1997	Anaconda	Warren Westridge		
1997	Titanic	J. Bruce Ismay		
1999	The Mummy	Dr. Allen Chamberlain		
2000	Eisenstein	Vsevolod Meyerhold		
2001	The Tailor of Panama	Cavendish		
2006	The Contract	Turner		
2006	Land of the Blind	Smith		
2015	Crimson Peak	Ogilvie		
2017	Breathe	Dr. Entwistle		
2021	Trollhunters: Rise of the Titans	Walt Strickler (voice)		
2023	Doctor Jekyll	Henry Jekyll		
2024	Sebastian	Nicholas		
2024	Hamlet	Claudius		
2024	The Brutalist	Lesley Woodrow		
2026	Ink	Sir Alick McKay		

=== Television ===
Year	Title	Role	Notes	Ref.
1978	The Professionals	Tommy	1 episode	
1985	Screen Two	Wilson Barrett	1 episode	
1985	A.D.	Tigellinus	Miniseries, 1 episode	
1985	Honour, Profit and Pleasure	Aaron Hill	Television film	
1989	Shadow of the Noose	Edward Marshall Hall	8 episodes	
1993	Lovejoy	Jonathan Wilsher	1 episode	
1994	The Memoirs of Sherlock Holmes	Culverton Smith	1 episode: The Dying Detective	
1994	Cadfael	Lord Godfrid Picard	1 episode	
1995	Bliss	Dr. Oliver Pleasance	Television film	
1996	A Touch of Frost	Dr. Keith Michaelson	1 episode	
1999	Joan of Arc	Duke of Bedford	Miniseries, 2 episodes	
2000	The Prince and the Pauper	Lord Hertford	Television film	
2001	Attila	Flavius Felix	Miniseries, 2 episodes	
2001	Princess of Thieves	Prince John	Television film	
2002	Midsomer Murders	Frank Smythe-Webster	1 episode: A Tale of Two Hamlets	
2002	Dinotopia	Mayor Waldo	Main role, 8 episodes	
2004	Sherlock Holmes and the Case of the Silk Stocking	George Pentney	Television film	
2006	The Curse of King Tut's Tomb	Morgan Sinclair	Television film	
2008	King Lear	Kent	Television film	
2011	Spooks	Ilya Gavrik	Recurring role, 6 episodes	
2013	Foyle's War	Colonel Galt	1 episode	
2013	Endeavour	Sir Edmund Sloan	1 episode	
2014–2017	The Strain	Eldritch Palmer / The Master	Main role, 46 episodes	
2016	Tokyo Trial	William Webb	Miniseries, 4 episodes	
2016–2018	Trollhunters: Tales of Arcadia	Walt Strickler (voice)	Main role, 42 episodes	
2018	3Below: Tales of Arcadia	Walt Strickler (voice)	1 episode	
2023	The Crown	Duke of Norfolk	1 episode	
2025	All Creatures Great and Small	General Beauvoir	2 episodes	

== Theatre work ==
=== With the Glasgow Citizens' Theatre ===
Year	Title	Role	Ref.
1974	Camino Real	Casanova	
1974	Coriolanus	Aufidius	
1974	Indians	Mr President	
1974	Saint Joan of the Stockyards	Slift	
1975	The De Sade Show	De Sade	
1975	The Duchess of Malfi	the Cardinal	
1975	The Government Inspector	the Superintendent of Schools	
1975	Hamlet	Polonius	
1975	Romeo and Juliet	Capulet	
1976	Woyzeck	the Doctor	
1976	What the Butler Saw	Rance	
1976	Seven Deadly Sins	the Mother	
1976	Mirandolina	Forlipopoli	
1976	Masquerade	Sprich	
1977	Chinchilla	Levka/Gabriel	
1977	The Country Wife	Dorilant	
1977	Figaro	Bartolo	
1977	The Importance of Being Earnest	Lady Bracknell	
1979	Good Humoured Ladies	Silvestra	

=== With the Royal Shakespeare Company ===
- Mercutio in Romeo and Juliet (Ron Daniels, RST, Aldwych, 1980)
- Oliver in As You Like It (Terry Hands, RST, 1980, Aldwych, 1981)
- Richmond in Richard III (Hands, RST, 1980, Aldwych, 1981)
- Aumerle in Richard II (Hands, RST, 1980, Aldwych, 1981)
- Tom Nightwork in The Swan Down Gloves (Ian Judge/Hands, RST, 1981, Aldwych, 1981–82)
- Bassanio in The Merchant of Venice (John Barton, RST, Aldwych, 1981)
- Edgar in the Michael Gambon King Lear (Adrian Noble, RST, Barbican, 1982)
- Octavius in the Gambon/Helen Mirren Antony and Cleopatra (TOP, Pit, 1982)
- the Porter in Macbeth (Howard Davies, RST, 1982, Barbican, 1983)
- Laxton in The Roaring Girl (Barry Kyle, Barbican, 1983).

=== Return to Stratford as Associate Artist ===
- Vasques in 'Tis Pity She's a Whore (David Leveaux, Swan, 1991)
- Face in The Alchemist (Sam Mendes, Swan, 1991)
- Brutus in Julius Caesar (Steven Pimlott, RST, 1991)
- Columbus in Richard Nelson's Columbus and the Discovery of Japan (John Caird, Barbican, 1992)
- Kent in King Lear and Dorn in The Seagull (Trevor Nunn, Courtyard and International Tour, 2007).

=== Other theatre work ===
- Ferdinand in The Duchess of Malfi (Philip Prowse, NT Lyttelton, 1985)
- Muldoon in The Real Inspector Hound (Tom Stoppard, NT Olivier, 1985)
- Mr Sneer in The Critic (Sheila Hancock, NT Olivier, 1985)
- Yasha in The Cherry Orchard (Mike Alfreds, NT Cottesloe, 1985)
- Valmont in Christopher Hampton's Les liaisons dangereuses (Davies, Ambassadors, 1987)
- the Doge of Venice in Howard Barker's Scenes from an Execution (Ian McDiarmid, Almeida, 1990)
- the Count in Anouilh's The Rehearsal (McDiarmid, Almeida, 1990)
- Charles in Hanif Kureishi's Sleep With Me (NT Cottesloe, 1999)
- Creon opposite Tara Fitzgerald in Sophocles's Antigone (Declan Donnellan, Old Vic, 1999)
- Archie in Stoppard's Jumpers (David Leveaux, NT Lyttelton, 2003)
- Captain Hook in Peter Pan (Three Sixty Entertainment) (Neverland Pavilion in Kensington Gardens, 2009)
- Julius Caesar in Julius Caesar (Robert Hastie, Crucible Theatre, 2017)
- Richard Nixon in Frost/Nixon (Kate Hewitt, Crucible Theatre, 2018)
- Beau in Gently Down The Stream (Park Theatre, 2019)
- Claudius in Hamlet (Sean Mathias, Theatre Royal Windsor, 2021)
