= Little Dot =

Character in comics by Harvey Comics

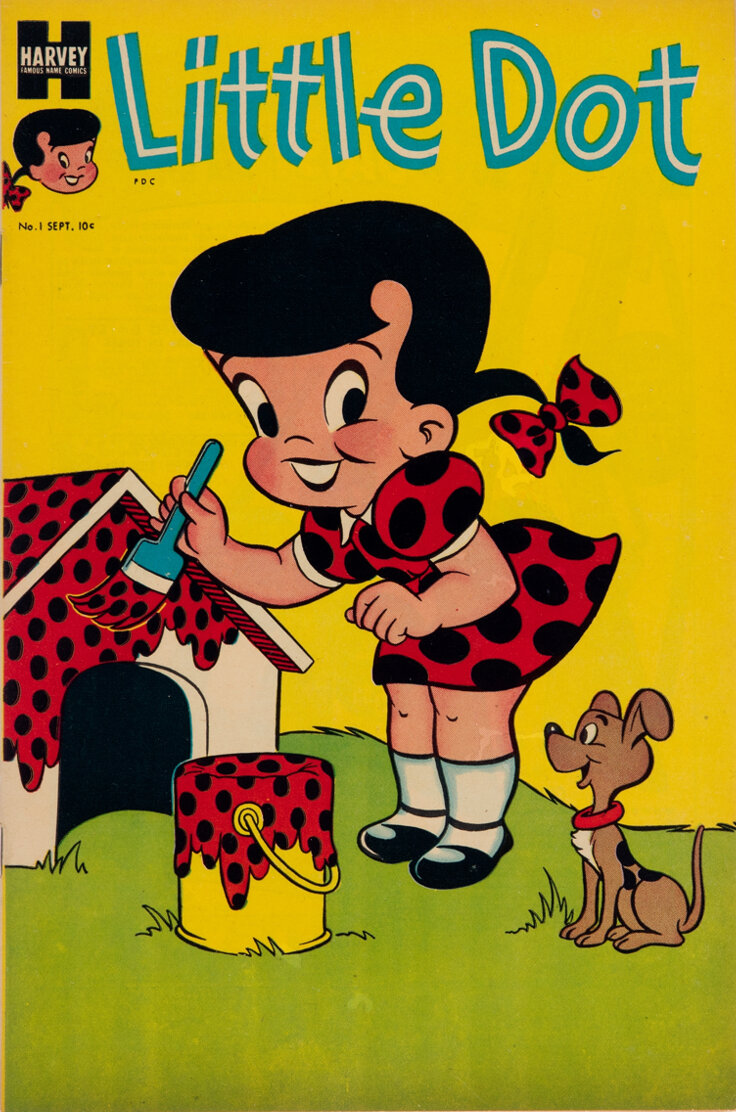
- Cover of Little Dot #1 (September 1953)

Publication information
- Publisher: Harvey Comics
- First appearance: Sad Sack Comics #1 (1949)
- Created by: Alfred Harvey (writer); Vic Herman (artist)

In-story information
- Full name: Dorothy Polka
- Species: Human
- Team affiliations: Little Lotta
- Abilities: Dottiness, Love of Dots
Little Dot
Publication information
- Publisher: Harvey Comics
- Schedule: Monthly
- Format: Ongoing series
- Genre: Humor
- Publication date: Sept. 1953 – Sept. 1973
- No. of issues: Little Dot: 164; Little Dot Dotland: 62
- Main character(s): Little Dot, Peter Polka (father), Little Dot's Uncles & Aunts

Little Dot is a comic book character published by Harvey Comics about a little girl who is obsessed with dots, spots, and round, colorful objects. She was created in 1949 by writer Alfred Harvey and artist Vic Herman.

== Publication history ==
Dot first appeared in 1949 as a supporting feature in Sad Sack Comics, Humphrey Comics and Little Max Comics. Until August 1953 (issue date) she was referred to as "Li'l Dot". In September 1953, she was given her own series named Little Dot, drawn by Steve Muffati, joining Harvey's growing cast of child-oriented comedy characters. The title lasted almost three decades between 1949 and 1982, and then sporadically until 1994. Dot introduced several other popular headliners (including Little Lotta and Richie Rich) as back page fillers. Another spin-off title which ran for thirteen years was Little Dot's Uncles & Aunts, about the adventures of Dot's impossibly extended family, each with an obsessive interest or quirky personality trait of their own.

Like most of the so-called "Harvey Girls", appearing also in the Richie Rich & his Girl Friends title, Dot reached her peak between the mid-1950s and the late 1960s, eventually eclipsing Little Audrey in terms of sales. Her popularity began to wane during the 1970s as an industry-wide distribution slump began forcing child-oriented comics off the newsstands. Dot's eponymous title stalled between 1982 and 1986, before being permanently discontinued in 1994.

Apart from the main title, Little Dot, the main character's screwball relatives proved popular enough to rate their own series: two issues of Harvey Hits in 1958 (#s 4 and 13); and a "king-sized" comic titled Little Dot's Uncles & Aunts, published for 52 issues between 1961 and 1974.

== Character ==
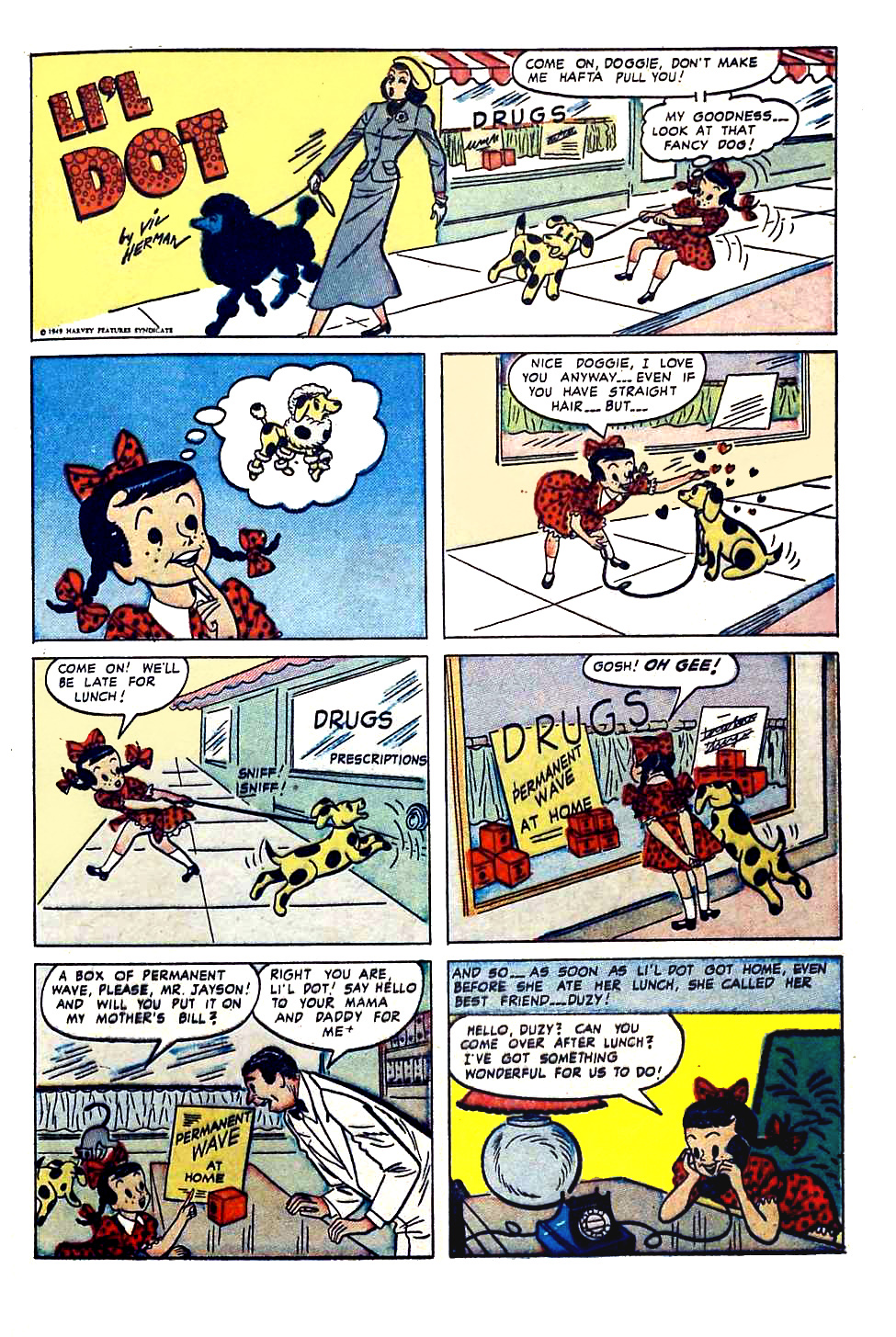
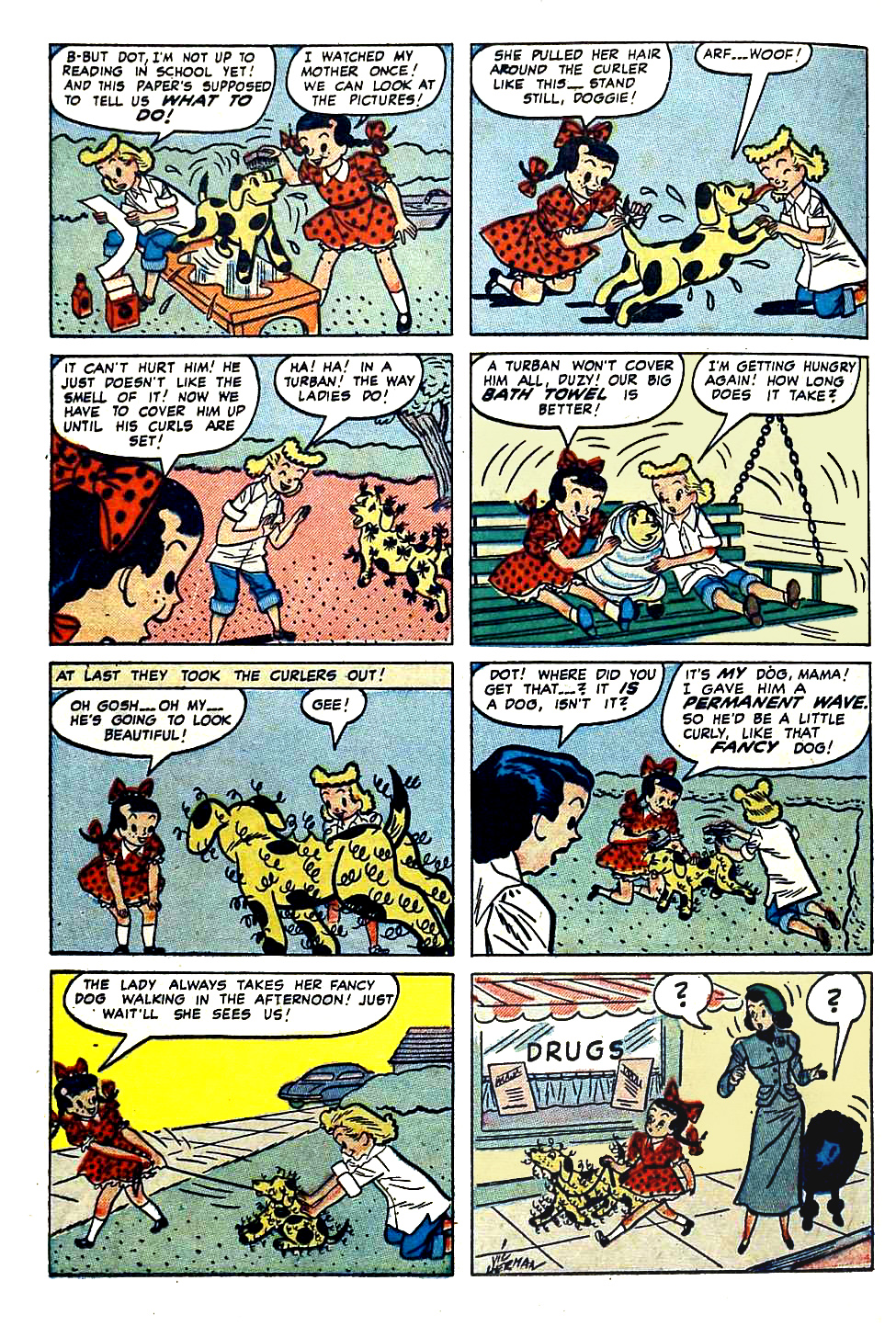
Li'l Dot, the late '40s precursor to Little Dot. Created by cartoonist Vic Herman, the back page filler focused mostly on situation comedy.

Little Dot (real name Dorothy Polka) was a "one-note character" with a reliance on formulaic gags and repetitious images (i.e. Dot's dots). Her stories also involved a considerable amount of slapstick humor and domestic comedy. The character's signature theme only became apparent in 1953, after she was redesigned to conform to the company's emerging house style. Consequently, as Dot became a virtual clone of Famous Studios' Little Audrey (which Harvey was licensing at the time), the 'Dotty' aspect was emphasized so that the two characters wouldn't appear too similar.

Dot's obsessive nature presaged the development of Harvey's quirky child-friendly characters, many of which deviated from the Audrey model by incorporating fantasy elements (Hot Stuff, Spooky), or oddball behavior (Little Lotta). On the other hand, generation-based humor always played an important role in Little Dot's storylines. Like her in-house contemporaries, Dot frequently found herself at odds with parents, teachers and other representatives of Bonnie Dell's adult population. Frequent plotlines involved her parents or teachers, who are annoyed with her obsession with dots, trying to trick her into giving up her dot addiction and catching it themselves. Another recurring story source is her numerous aunts and uncles who have myriad eccentricities that Dot has to deal with. In addition, Dot made regular crossovers with Little Lotta from the beginning of the sixties, usually with disastrous consequences (although Dot's fixation and Lotta's insatiable appetite often played only a peripheral role in such pairings). She and Lotta are classmates with Richie Rich.
