= List of Harvey Comics publications =

The following is an incomplete list of comic book series published by Harvey Comics.

== # ==
- 3-D Dolly

== A ==
- Adventures in 3-D #1–2 (November 1953–January 1954)
- Alarming Adventures #1–3 (October 1962–February 1963)
- Alarming Tales #1–6 (September 1957–November 1958)
- All New Comics #1–14 (January 1943–January 1947)
- Alvin and the Chipmunks #1–5 (July 1992–June 1994)

== B ==
- Babe Ruth Sports Comics #1–11 (April 1949–February 1951)
- Baby Huey
- Baby Huey and Papa
- Baby Huey Digest #1 (June 1992)
- Baby Huey Duckland
- Baby Huey, the Baby Giant
- Back to the Future #1–4 (November 1991–June 1992)
- Back to the Future: Forward to the Future #1–3 (October 1992–January 1993)
- Beethoven #1–3 (March 1994–July 1994); the first issue was an adaptation of the sequel film Beethoven's 2nd
- Beetle Bailey v2 #1–9 (September 1992–August 1994); continued from Dell Comics
- Beetle Bailey Big Book v2 #1–2 (November 1992–May 1993)
- Beetle Bailey Giant Size v2 #1–2 (October 1992–March 1993)
- Beetlejuice v1
  - Beetlejuice #1 (October 1991)
  - Beetlejuice in the Neitherworld #1 (November 1991)
  - Beetlejuice Holiday Special (February 1992)
- Beetlejuice v2
  - Beetlejuice: Crimebusters on the Haunt #1 (September 1992)
  - Beetlejuice: Elliot Mess and the Unwashables #2–3 (October 1992–November 1992)
- Black Cat Comics
- Black Cat Mystery
- Blondie Comics Monthly #16–141 (1950–1960); continues from David McKay Publications
- Blondie #142–163 (1960–1965); continues at King Features
- Bunny #1–21 (December 1966–November 1976)

== C ==
- Captain 3-D
- Captain Flower
- Captain Freedom
- Casper and... #1–12 (1987–1990); cover titled Casper the Friendly Ghost and...
- Casper and Friends
- Casper and Nightmare
- Casper and Spooky
- Casper and The Ghostly Trio v1 #1–7 (November 1972–)
- Casper and the Ghostly Trio v2 #8–10 (1990); continues from Casper the Friendly Ghost and...
- Casper and Wendy
- Casper in Space
- Casper Spaceship
- Casper Strange Ghost Stories
- Casper the Friendly Ghost
- Casper TV Showtime #1–5 (January 1980–October 1980)
- Casper's Ghostland
- Chamber of Chills
- Champion Comics #2–10 (December 1939–August 1940) continued as Champ Comics
- Champ Comics #11–25 (October 1940–May 1943) continued from Champion Comics #10
- Clown Comics
- Cyclone Comics #1–5 (June 1940–November 1940)

== D ==
- Daisy and Her Pups #1–18 (July 1951–May 1954); first five issues are numbered 21–25, continued from Blondie Comics Monthly #20
- Devil Kids Starring Hot Stuff #1–107 (July 1962–October 1981)
- Dick Tracy Monthly #25–145 (March 1950–April 1961); continues from Dell Comics
- Dottie Dripple Comics #3–24 (December 1948–June 1952); continues from Magazine Enterprises, continues as Horace and Dotty Dripple
- Double-Dare Adventures #1–2 (December 1966–March 1967)

== F ==
- Family Funnies #1–8 (September 1950–April 1951, continued as Tiny Tot Funnies from #9)
- Famous T.V. Funday Funnies #1 (September 1961)
- Felix the Cat v1 #62–118 (August 1955–November 1961); continues from Toby Press
- Felix the Cat v2 #1–9 (September 1991–January 1993)
- The Adventures of Felix the Cat #1 (May 1992)
- The New Adventures of Felix the Cat #1–7 (1992)
- First Love Illustrated (1949–1963)
- Fighting American
- Fighting Fronts! #1–5 (August 1952–January 1953)
- Flash Gordon #1–5 (October 1950–June 1951)
- Flat-Top
- The Flintstones
- The Flintstones: The Official Movie Adaptation in Double Vision (September 1994)
- Flip #1–2 (April–June 1954)
- Fruitman Special #1 (December 1969)
- Funny 3-D #1 (December 1953)

== G ==
- Green Hornet Comics #7–47 (June 1942–September 1949); continues from Helnit Publishing, continues at Dell Publishing

== H ==
- Hanna-Barbera Big Book #1 (June 1993)
- Hanna-Barbera Giant Size #1–3 (October 1992–October 1993)
- Harvey Collectors Comics
- Harvey Comics Hits
- Harvey Hits
- Harvey Hits Comics
- Herman and Katnip
- Hot Stuff the Little Devil
- Hot Stuff Creepy Caves
- Hot Stuff Sizzlers
- Hot Stuff the Little Devil
- Humphrey Comics #1–22 (October 1948–April 1952)

== I ==
- The Incredible Crash Dummies #1–3 (November 1993–January 1994)
- Invisible Scarlet O'Neil #1–4 (December 1950–April 1951)

== J ==
- Jackie Jokers #1–4 (March 1973–September 1973)
- The Jetsons #1–5 (September 1992–November 1993)
- Jiggs and Maggie #22–27 (June 1949–February 1952); continues from Standard Comics
- Jigsaw #1–2 (September 1966–December 1966)
- Joe Palooka #1–118 (November 1945–March 1961)
- Junior Funnies #10–13 (August 1951–February 1952); continued from Tiny Tot Funnies #9

== K ==
- Kerry Drake Detective Cases #6–33 (January 1948–August 1952); continued from Magazine Enterprises

== L ==
- Little Audrey
- Little Audrey and Melvin
- Little Audrey TV Funtime
- Little Dot
- Little Dot Dotland
- Little Dot's Uncles & Aunts
- Little Dracula #1–3 (January–May 1992)
- Little Lotta
- Little Lotta in Foodland
- Little Sad Sack

== M ==
- Man in Black #1–4 (September 1957–March 1958)
- Mazie #14–22 (February 1955–September 1956); continued from Nationwide Publishing Company
- Mazie and Her Boy Friends #23–28 (September 1957–August 1958)
- Monster in My Pocket
- Muppet Babies #1–6 (July 1993–August 1994); continued from Star Comics
- Mutt and Jeff #116–148 (February 1960–November 1965); continued from Dell Comics

== N ==
- NBC Saturday Morning Comics #1 (September 1991)
- New Kids on the Block #1–8 (December 1990–November 1991)
- Nightmare and Casper #1–5 (August 1963–August 1964)
- The Nine Lives of Felix the Cat #1–5 (October 1991–July 1992)

== O ==
- O.K. Comics #1–2 (July 1940–October 1940)

== P ==
- Paramount Animated Comics #3–22 (February 1953–July 1956)
- Pebbles and Bamm Bamm
- Phantom
- Pink Panther
- Pocket Comics #1–4 (August 1941–January 1942)
- Popeye

== R ==
- Race for the Moon #1–3 (March–November 1958)
- Rags Rabbit
- Richie Rich
- Richie Rich Adventure Digest
- Richie Rich and...
- Richie Rich and Billy Bellhops
- Richie Rich and Cadbury
- Richie Rich and Casper
- Richie Rich and Dollar The Dog
- Richie Rich and Dot
- Richie Rich and Gloria
- Richie Rich and His Girlfriends
- Richie Rich and His Mean Cousin Reggie
- Richie Rich and Jackie Jokers
- Richie Rich and New Kids on the Block
- Richie Rich and Professor Keenbean
- Richie Rich Bank Books
- Richie Rich Best of the Years Digest
- Richie Rich Big Book
- Richie Rich Big Bucks
- Richie Rich Billions
- Richie Rich Cash
- Richie Rich Cash Money
- Richie Rich Casper and Wendy National League
- Richie Rich Diamonds
- Richie Rich Digest
- Richie Rich Digest Stories
- Richie Rich Digest Winners
- Richie Rich Dollars and Cents
- Richie Rich Fortunes
- Richie Rich Gems
- Richie Rich Giant Size
- Richie Rich Gold and Silver
- Richie Rich Gold Nuggets Digest
- Richie Rich Holiday Digest
- Richie Rich Inventions
- Richie Rich Jackpots
- Richie Rich Meets Timmy Time
- Richie Rich Million Dollar Digest
- Richie Rich Millions
- Richie Rich Money World
- Richie Rich Money World Digest
- Richie Rich Profits
- Richie Rich Relics
- Richie Rich Riches
- Richie Rich Success Stories
- Richie Rich Summer Bonanza
- Richie Rich Treasure Chest Digest
- Richie Rich Vacation Digest
- Richie Rich Vacations Digest
- Richie Rich Vault of Mystery
- Richie Rich Zillionz
- Ripley's Believe It or Not! #1–4 (September 1953–March 1954)
- Rocky & Bullwinkle
- Romance Stories of True Love #45–52 (May 1957–November 1958, continued from True Love Problems and Advice Illustrated from #44)

== S ==
- Sad Sack and the Sarge
- Sad Sack Comics
- Sad Sack Laugh Special
- Sad Sack's Army Life
- Sad Sack's Funny Friends #1–75 (December 1955–October 1969)
- Sad Sad Sack World
- Saved by the Bell #1–5 (May 1992–May 1993)
- Scooby-Doo
- Speed Comics #12–44 (March 1941–January 1947) continued from Brookwood Publications
- The Spirit #1–2 (September 1966–March 1967)
- Spitfire Comics #1–2 (August 1941–October 1941); John F. Mahon
- Spooky Haunted House
- Spooky Spooktown
- Spooky the Tuff Little Ghost
- Spyman #1–3 (September 1966–February 1967)
- Stone Protectors #0 + #1–3 (1993, May–September 1994)
- Stretch
- Stumbo Tinytown
- Stunt Dawgs #1 (March 1993)
- Stuntman Comics #1–3 (April 1946–October 1946)
- Super Richie

== T ==
- Tastee-Freez Comics #1–6 (1957)
- Tastee-Freez Junior Rocketeer Manual (1957)
- Teen-Age Brides #1–7 (August 1953–August 1954); continues as True Brides Experiences from #8)
- Terry and the Pirates #3–26 (April 1947–April 1951); continued from Boy Explorers Comics; see Charlton Comics
- Thrill-O-Rama #1–3 (October 1965–December 1966); cover titled Thrill-O-Rama presents The Pirana: Deadliest Creature in All the World
- Thrills of Tomorrow #17–20 (October 1954–April 1955) continues from Tomb of Terror
- Time of Decision (1955)
- Tiny Tot Funnies #9 (June 1951); continues from Family Funnies from #8; continues as Junior Funnies
- Tom and Jerry #1–18 (September 1991–August 1994)
- Tom and Jerry 50th Anniversary Special #1 (October 1991)
- Tom and Jerry Adventures #1 (May 1992)
- Tom and Jerry and Friends #1—4 (December 1991—July 1992)
- Tom and Jerry Annual #1 (September 1991)
- Tom and Jerry Big Book #1–2 (September 1992–June 1993)
- Tom and Jerry Giant Size #1–2 (October 1992–October 1993)
- Tomb of Terror #1–16 (June 1952–July 1954); continues as Thrills of Tomorrow
- Top Notch Funnies (May 1959)
- Troll Patrol #1 (January 1993)
- True 3D #1–2 (December 1953–February 1954)
- True Bride to Be Romances #17–30 (April 1956–November 1958, continued from True Brides Experiences from #16)
- True Brides Experiences #8–16 (October 1954–February 1956, continued as True Bride to Be Romances from #17)
- True Love Problems and Advice Illustrated #1–44 (); continued as Romance Stories of True Love
- True War Experiences #1–4 (August1952–December 1952)
- Tuff Ghosts Starring Spooky #1–43 (July 1962–October 1972)
- TV Casper and Company #1–46 (August 1963–April 1974)

== U ==
- Ultraman
- Underdog
- Unearthly Spectaculars #1–3 (October 1965–March 1967)

== W ==
- War Battles #1–9 (February 1952–December 1953)
- Wendy and the New Kids on the Block #1–3 (March–July 1991)
- Wendy the Good Little Witch
- Wendy Witch World
- Woody Woodpecker

== Y ==
- Yogi Bear

== See also ==
- Harvey Comics
- List of Herman and Katnip cartoons
- List of The Flintstones media
