= Sad Sack (disambiguation) =

Sad Sack could refer to:

- Sad Sack, an American comic strip and comic book character created by Sgt. George Baker
  - The Sad Sack, a 1957 American film based on the George Baker characters
  - Sad Sack Laugh Special, a 1958-1977 American comic book series featuring Sad Sack characters
  - Sad Sad Sack World, a 1964-1973 American comic book series featuring Sad Sack characters
- Sad Sack (Arrested Development), a 2004 season 2 episode of Arrested Development
- "Sad Sack Wasp Trap", a 2018 season 1 episode of Succession
- Sad Sack, a character in the animated series The Raggy Dolls

== See also ==
- Half-Sack Epps, a SAMCRO member on Sons of Anarchy
