= Matty's Funday Funnies =

American animated television series

- 1960 ABC promotional slide with Baby Huey.
- Also known as: Matty's Funnies
- Genre: Animation
- Directed by: Dave Tendlar; Seymour Kneitel; Izzy Sparber; Bill Tytla
- Presented by: Marvin Miller
- Voices of: Cecil Roy; Sylvia Meredeth; Mae Questel; Jackson Beck; Arnold Stang; Jack Mercer; Norma MacMillan; Sid Raymond
- Theme music composer: Hoyt Curtin
- Opening theme: Jack Roberts
- Composer: Winston Sharples
- Country of origin: United States
- Original language: English

Production
- Executive producer: Alfred Harvey
- Producer: Leon Harvey
- Running time: 30 minutes
- Production companies: Harvey Films; Animation: Paramount Cartoon Studios

Original release
- Network: ABC
- Release: October 11, 1959 – December 30, 1961

Related
- Beany and Cecil; The New Casper Cartoon Show

Matty's Funday Funnies is a 1959–1961 American animated anthology television series.

== Broadcast history ==
The original Matty's Funday Funnies was broadcast from 1959 to 1961 by American Broadcasting Company, scheduled during Sunday afternoons (with a 1960—1961 prime time edition during Friday evenings, rescheduled for early Saturday nights for the autumn of 1961). The series premiered on October 11, 1959, was later renamed Matty's Funnies, and was broadcast by the network until December 30, 1961; the "Matty" of the title referred to Matty Mattel, the animated boy mascot character for Mattel Toymakers, the show's original sponsor.

The show originally compiled the 1950—1959 set of theatrical animated short film series produced by Famous Studios, the animation studio run by Paramount Pictures, featuring characters including Casper the Friendly Ghost, Herman and Katnip, Baby Huey, Little Audrey, Buzzy the Crow and various Noveltoon, Screen Song, Kartune and Modern Madcap shorts, whose opening titles were reshot under the new Harveytoon brand because Harvey Comics, the comic book publisher which been previously licensing the characters from Paramount for its comics based on the cartoons, had bought out all the rights to the intellectual properties overall, and had since then already re-established the Famous Studios characters as part of its comic book legacy.

Matty (voiced by Cecil Roy) and his companion sibling Sister Belle (voiced by Sylvia Meredeth) would introduce the cartoons and show commercials for Mattel products. The animation for these title sequences and bumpers, all featuring Matty, Belle and the Famous Studios characters, were animated by Famous Studios veteran Steve Muffatti. Later during the autumn of 1962, the show entered local syndication as Casper and Company, with new titles omitting Mattel's original sponsorship, along with the Matty Mattel and Sister Belle characters.

== Matty's Funnies with Beany and Cecil ==
On January 6, 1962, the program was replaced with a new Mattel-sponsored series titled Matty's Funnies with Beany and Cecil, featuring Bob Clampett's Beany and Cecil. A redesigned Matty Mattel and Sister Belle would appear as directors of the cartoons and in many intermissions along with Clampett's characters of Beany Boy, Cecil the Seasick Sea Serpent, Captain Huffenpuff, Dishonest John, Go Go Man Van Gogh, et al.

There were only 26 half-hour shows made with this format, with the last episode broadcast on June 30 the same year. The series then continued being broadcast during its regular early Saturday evening time as reruns until December 29. From 1963 to 1967, the series was repeated on the network's Saturday and Sunday morning schedules (and then ultimately broadcast in syndication) as The Beany and Cecil Show.
