= List of Herman and Katnip cartoons =

This is a list of the various animated cartoons featuring Herman and Katnip. In total, the pair co-starred in 33 shorts during the golden age of American animation.

== Miscellaneous appearances in the Paramount Picture series and The Baby Huey Show ==
=== Herman and Henry in the Noveltoons series ===
- The Henpecked Rooster - February 18, 1944 - director: Seymour Kneitel/Orestes Calpini (first appearance of Herman).
- Scrappily Married featuring Herman and Henry - March 30, 1945 - Kneitel/Calpini
- Sudden Fried Chicken featuring Herman and Henry - October 18, 1946 - Bill Tytla/Calpini

=== Herman's solo appearances ===
==== Main appearances in the Noveltoons series ====
- Cheese Burglar featuring Herman - February 22, 1946 - I. Sparber/Jim Tyer (Herman's first solo cartoon. This cartoon appeared in Four Rooms).
- Campus Capers featuring Herman - July 1, 1949 - Tytla/George Germanetti

==== Cameo guest appearance in the Noveltoons series ====
- Butterscotch and Soda featuring Little Audrey - July 16, 1948 - Kneitel/Al Eugster

==== Cameo guest appearance in Popeye the Sailor ====
- The Island Fling - December 27, 1946 - Tytla/John Gentilella (Herman's solo cameo guest appearance in this banned short).

==== Supporting appearance as Captain in Screen Songs ====
- Gobs of Fun - July 28, 1950 - Sparber/Eugster

==== Name only in Casper the Friendly Ghost ====
- Ground Hog Play - February 10, 1956 - Kneitel/Tom Golden (Note: Only Herman's name was shown in this short).

=== Buzzy and Katnip in the Noveltoons series ===
- Sock-a-Bye Kitty featuring Buzzy - December 2, 1950 - Kneitel/Dave Tendlar
- As Tte Crow Lies featuring Buzzy - June 1, 1951 - Kneitel/Tendlar
- Cat-Choo featuring Buzzy and Katnip - October 12, 1951 - Kneitel/Tendlar
- The Awful Tooth featuring Buzzy and Katnip - May 2, 1952 - Kneitel/Eugster
- Better Bait Than Never featuring Buzzy - June 5, 1953 - Kneitel/Tendlar
- Hair Today Gone Tomorrow featuring Buzzy - April 16, 1954 - Kneitel/Tendlar (Note: Katnip's final appearance in the Noveltoons short).

=== Proto-Katnip's solo appearance in a Noveltoons short ===
- Hep Cat Symphony - February 4, 1949 - Kneitel/Tendlar (Note: Proto-Katnip's only solo appearance).

=== Katnip's solo appearances in the Noveltoons series ===
- City Kitty - July 18, 1952 - Sparber/Eugster (Katnip's first solo appearance).
- Feast and Furious featuring Finny - December 26, 1952 - Sparber/Myron Waldman

=== Katnip's solo guest appearances in The Baby Huey Show ===
- Self Help Huey - October 28, 1995 - Joe Horne
- Three Ducks and a Dope - November 18, 1995 - Steve Loter

== Herman and Katnip (1947, 1950–1959) ==
=== Herman and Proto-Katnip in the Noveltoons series ===
- Naughty But Mice featuring Herman - October 10, 1947 - Kneitel/Tendlar
- Saved by the Bell featuring Herman - September 15, 1950 - Kneitel/Tendlar

=== Herman and Official Katnip in the Noveltoons series ===
- Mice Meeting You featuring Herman - November 10, 1950 - Kneitel/Tendlar (Note: Katnip's first official appearance)
- Mice Paradise featuring Herman - March 9, 1951 - Sparber/Tendlar
- Cat Tamale featuring Herman and Katnip - November 9, 1951 - Kneitel/Tendlar
- Cat Carson Rides Again featuring Herman and Katnip - April 4, 1952 - Kneitel/Tendlar

=== Herman and Katnip short films ===
- Mice-Capades - October 3, 1952 - Kneitel/Eugster (First Herman and Katnip short).
- Of Mice and Magic - February 20, 1953 - Sparber/Tendlar
- Herman the Catoonist - May 15, 1953 - Sparber/Waldman
- Drinks on the Mouse - August 28, 1953 - Tendlar/Martin Taras
- Northwest Mousie - December 28, 1953 - Kneitel/Eugster
- Surf and Sound - March 5, 1954 - Tendlar/Taras
- Of Mice and Menace - June 25, 1954 - Kneitel/Golden (Note: Allen Swift voiced Herman).
- Ship A-Hooey - August 20, 1954 - Sparber/Golden
- Rail-Rodents - November 26, 1954 - Tendlar/Taras
- Robin Rodenthood - February 25, 1955 - Tendlar/Taras (Note: Allen Swift voiced Herman).
- A Bicep Built for Two - April 8, 1955 - Kneitel/Golden (Note: Allen Swift voiced Herman).
- Mouse Trapeze - August 5, 1955 - Sparber/Golden (Note: Allen Swift voiced Herman).
- Mousieur Herman - November 25, 1955 - Tendlar/Bill Hudson (Note: First with shorter instrumental theme music).
- Mouseum - February 24, 1956 - Kneitel/Eugster
- Will Do Mousework - June 29, 1956 - Knietel/Golden
- Mousetro Herman - August 10, 1956 - Sparber/Eugster
- Hide and Peak - December 10, 1956 - Tendlar/Morey Reden
- Cat in the Act - February 22, 1957 - Tendlar/Reden
- Sky Scrappers - June 14, 1957 - Tendlar/Reden (Note: Jack Mercer voiced Katnip).
- From Mad to Worse - August 16, 1957 - Kneitel/Thomas Johnson (Note: First appearance of new animated intro in the short)
- One Funny Knight - November 22, 1957 - Tendlar/Wm. B. Pattengill
- Frighty Cat - March 14, 1958 - Sparber/Johnson
- You Said a Mouseful - August 29, 1958 - Kneitel/Johnson (Note: Jack Mercer voiced Katnip).
- Owly to Bed - 1958 - Kneitel/Johnson
- Felineous Assault - 1958 - Kneitel/Johnson
- Fun on Furlough - April 3, 1959 - Kneitel/Frank Endres (Note: Jack Mercer voiced Katnip).
- Katnip's Big Day - October 30, 1959 - Kneitel (Note: This is the final Herman and Katnip short)

=== Guest appearance in Casper the Friendly Ghost ===
- Ghost of Honor - July 19, 1957 - Sparber/Waldman (NOTE: Herman and Katnip's only guest appearances in this short along with the others).
