= Matty Mattel =

Mascot for Mattel Toys

Matty Mattel was the boy mascot for Mattel Inc. Toymakers. As the "King of Toys," Matty was the host and sponsor of TV's Matty's Funday Funnies in the 1960s. Matty was part of Mattel's advertising from 1955 to 1970 and then renewed in the 1980s, printed in Mattel warranty information.

== History ==
The serrated seal logo for Mattel was designed in 1955 and based on a concept by Mattel co-founder Elliot Handler. The character of "Matty" derived his name from Mattel, which was named after founders, Harold Mattson and Elliot Handler - thus, the hybrid name of Matt + El (short for Elliot) yielded Mattel. This serrated seal, sometimes referred to as 'The Mattel', had a giant letter M in the center with a small boy shown waving, and wearing a crown on his head; this was Matty.

Matty was featured on all Mattel products and TV commercials from 1959 through 1970 as the company's logo. He was the familiar mascot that jumped atop the giant "M" in Mattel TV commercials and shouted, "You can tell it's Mattel. IT'S SWELL!" The serrated seal with Matty seated and waving from the giant "M" was replaced with a new serrated seal design with Mattel's name printed across it in 1970, which was the company's 25th anniversary. The new serrated seal is still used today.

== TV ==
Matty Mattel and his Sister Belle hosted a Sunday morning cartoon show called Matty's Funday Funnies from 1961 to 1963. Cartoon shorts of Casper the Friendly Ghost, Beany and Cecil and Harvey Cartoons were a big part of the show, in-between Mattel toy commercials that were duly shown. Matty, Sister Belle, and Casper the ghost were the first talking dolls produced by Mattel after introducing Chatty Cathy, who came on the market in 1960. Matty and Sister Belle were on the market from 1961 to 1963. Casper was produced from 1961 to 1963 in crisp white terry cloth, while in 1964-65, he was made of white plush but was essentially the same doll.

In 1962 and 1963, the show's name was changed to Matty's Funnies With Beany and Cecil and aired exclusively the new Beany and Cecil cartoons produced by Bob Clampett. The Matty and Sister Belle characters would appear between cartoon segments, announce the upcoming Mattel Toy commercial, and again at the end of the program to preview next week's show. The Matty and Sister Belle characters were later omitted as Mattel Inc. later re-edited the shows for Saturday mornings beginning 1964. However, Mattel remained the sponsor. Starting in 1979, Matty appeared again as the character associated with Mattel's consumer "hotline," where he was featured on packages along with the company's 800 number.

In 2008, a grown-up version of Matty was introduced as Mattel's "Master Toy Collector" and the mascot of MattyCollector.com, a website that sells action figures from the various lines which Mattel licenses or owns.
