= Baby Huey's Great Easter Adventure =

- Movie Poster
- Directed by: Stephen Furst
- Written by: Daryl Busby; Matty Simmons
- Produced by: Robert Grand; Matty Simmons
- Starring: Maureen McCormick; Joseph Bologna; Harvey Korman; David Lander; Denny Dillon; Rachel Snow; Michael Angarano; David Leisure; Stephen Furst (voice)
- Cinematography: John M. Stephens
- Music by: Nathan Furst
- Production company: The Harvey Entertainment Company
- Distributed by: Columbia TriStar Home Video (United States); The Harvey Entertainment Company (International)
- Release date: March 2, 1999
- Running time: 95 minutes
- Country: United States
- Language: English

Baby Huey's Great Easter Adventure is a 1999 American adventure film directed by Stephen Furst, based on the Harvey Entertainment Company animated character Baby Huey. It was released by Columbia TriStar Home Video on VHS on March 2, 1999, and on DVD on February 15, 2005, by Classic Media.

A majority of the film's cast and crew were National Lampoon veterans.

== Cast ==
- Joseph Bologna as P.T. Wynnsocki
- Maureen McCormick as Nick's Mom
- Harvey Korman as Prof. von Klupp
- David Lander as Bernie
- Michael Angarano as Nick
- Tiffany Taunman as Little Audrey
- Rachel Snow as Lotta
- David Leisure as Nick's Dad
- Denny Dillon as Crabby Mom
- Peter Jurasik as Tigers' Manager
- Stuart Pankin as Umpire
- Allyce Beasley as Elsa
- Stephen Furst as:
  - Phantoms' Manager
  - Baby Huey (voice)
- Laraine Newman as Minnie
- John Vernon as Principal Scotti
- Rodger Bumpass as:
  - Irv
  - Baby Huey (costume)
- Promise LaMarco as Teacher
- Melissa Haizlip as Miss Twinkle
- Kate Simmons as Patsy
- Leonard Joseph as Gym Teacher

== Production ==
The film was part of a 12-film slate of direct-to-video productions by Harvey Entertainment based on their properties. Harvey Entertainment reported an estimated loss of $250,000 directly tied to the film.

== See also ==
- List of Easter films
