= Beany and Cecil =

American animated television series

- Characters from left to right: Crowy, Captain Horatio Huffenpuff, Cecil, Beany, Dishonest John
- Also known as: The Beany and Cecil Show
- Created by: Bob Clampett
- Voices of: Jim MacGeorge; Irv Shoemaker; Bob Clampett
- Composers: Bob Clampett; Sody Clampett; Hoyt Curtin; Jack Roberts
- Country of origin: United States
- Original language: English
- No. of seasons: 1
- No. of episodes: 26 (78 segments)

Production
- Executive producer: A.C.R. Stone
- Producer: Bob Clampett
- Running time: 30 minutes
- Production company: Bob Clampett Productions

Original release
- Network: ABC
- Release: January 6 – June 30, 1962

Related
- Time for Beany; The New Adventures of Beany and Cecil

Beany and Cecil is an American animated series created by Bob Clampett for the American Broadcasting Company. The cartoon was based on the television puppet show Time for Beany, which Clampett produced for Paramount Pictures company and its Paramount Television Network beginning in 1949. The series was broadcast first as part of the series Matty's Funnies during 1962, later renamed Beany and Cecil. A short-lived revival, The New Adventures of Beany and Cecil, was produced in 1988.

Although a children's show, it incorporated satirical references to current events and personalities that adults found entertaining, and the show also attracted adult viewers. Some of the plots and remarks were recognizable as lampoons of current political issues.

Along with The Jetsons and The Flintstones, it was one of the first three color television series by the ABC television network (the initial season, though, was originally shown in black and white, as ABC was unable to broadcast color programs until September 1962).

== Cast and characters ==
=== Main characters ===
- Beany Boy is a young, cupid-faced boy with a beanie cap. Beany is a good-hearted lad. In most episodes, Beany would be kidnapped by a villain or get caught in a rough situation, crying "Help, Cecil! Help!" to which Cecil would reply "I'm a-comin', Beany-boy!" as he raced to the rescue. This has become something of a catchphrase. Beany was originally voiced by Jim MacGeorge for the 1960s series and by Mark Hildreth for the 1980s series.
- Cecil (or "Cecil the Seasick Sea Serpent") is a large green sea serpent with a slight lisp. He is fiercely loyal to Beany, but he is not very clever. Cecil's trusting good nature invariably results in him being taken advantage of by the bad people, and he often suffers a great amount of physical abuse (getting smashed flat, losing his head, having his skin burned off, being shattered to pieces), examples of cartoon physics. The end of Cecil's tail was never seen in most episodes, as it always extended off-screen or was hidden behind an obstacle. This is likely a joking reference to the original Cecil, a hand puppet whose tail was likewise hidden. His neck often showed folds and creases like that of a sock puppet as well, another reference to the original Cecil. Cecil's tail did appear in "Beany and the Jackstalk" when his entire body became wound into the tension spring of a giant cuckoo clock. Cecil also has a superhero alter-ego known as Super-Cecil. In this guise, he wears a modified Superman shirt (complete with cape). It was Cecil who yodels "A Bob Clam-pett car-tooooooo-OOOOOOOOON!" at the end of the opening song of each episode. Cecil was voiced originally by Irv Shoemaker for the 1960s cartoon and by Billy West for the 1980s cartoon.
- Captain Horatio Huffenpuff, also called "Uncle Captain", is Beany's kindly uncle and the captain of the ship Leakin' Lena, which takes the pals from one destination to the other. The Captain is always willing to instruct Beany and Cecil on their latest assignment, but is rather cowardly and refuses to put himself in any personal jeopardy, locking himself below the deck or under a box labeled "Capt. Huffenpuff's Hiding Box" for most of the episodes. Uncle Captain was voiced by Jim MacGeorge for both series.
- Crowy is the navigator of the ship Leakin' Lena. He is a crow, and unsurprisingly spends most of his time in the ship's crow's nest. He speaks with a squawky voice and tends to faint whenever the ship encounters some sort of hazard. Crowy was voiced by Jim MacGeorge (though Don Messick did so in one episode).
- Dishonest John (or "D.J.") is a mobster villain and the main antagonist of the show. He is dressed formally like a Simon Legree character, and is constantly scheming to foil Beany and Cecil's adventures. His catchphrase is his sinister laugh, "Nya-ah-ãhh!", and he occasionally refers to Cecil as a "tall toad", "worm" or "big salami" (referring to his big, limbless body). His introductions in an episode are typically accompanied by a piano rendition of "Mysterioso Pizzicato". Whenever Dishonest John's schemes are revealed to the heroes, Cecil tends to respond with an aghast "What the heck! D.J., you dirty guy!". When Dishonest John receives his inevitable defeat, it is usually just as bad as the abuse Cecil has endured during the rest of the episode. Dishonest John also has a supervillain alter-ego known as The Bilious Beetle. In this guise, he can fly by his power and has a stinger. "D.J." also appeared disguised on occasion as the mechanical robotic octopus "William The Octopus" usually in haphazard attempts to simulate sea storms to scare away the crew of the Leakin' Lena when on a treasure hunt. Dishonest John carried a business card that read: "Dirty deeds done dirt cheap. Special rates for Sundays and holidays". This was the inspiration for the AC/DC song "Dirty Deeds Done Dirt Cheap". In the 1980s series, one episode revealed that DJ is a member of a club called the Brotherhood of B.L.E.C.H. (short for Bad Guys, Losers, Evildoers, Crooks, and Horrible People). His appearance was based on Larry Martin, an animator Clampett worked for at Harman-Ising Productions. DJ was originally voiced by Irv Shoemaker for the 1960s series and by Maurice LaMarche for the 1980s series.

=== Minor characters ===
- Cecilia McCoy is a she-serpent and Cecil's girlfriend. In the two-episode arc, "Beany Blows His Top" and "Beany Flips His Lid", Dishonest John attempts to sabotage their relationship by disguising himself as another sea serpent named Rex.
- Davey Cricket is a cricket with a coonskin cap who lives in the backwoods of Eight-Nine-Tennessee. The character is a parody of Walt Disney's wildly popular segments on the Disneyland television show based on the life of American frontiersman Davy Crockett. In Cricket's self-titled episode, Dishonest John tries unsuccessfully to sign Davey to a lucrative Hollywood movie contract. He appeared in the episodes: "Davey Cricket" and "Davey Cricket's Leading Ladybug".
- Go Man Van Gogh is a stereotypical cartoon beatnik/wild man who lives in the jungles of Wildsville on the Hungry I-Land. He often paints various things with his paintbrush, including paintings, vines to swing on, and fake backdrops to fool enemies (ala Wile E. Coyote and the Road Runner). He also often plays a set of bongo drums, does scat singing, and speaks with various beatnik stereotype slang. Though he did not appear in many episodes, he was somewhat recurring. He was voiced originally by Lord Buckley in "The Wildman of Wildsville" (a 1959 short film that was later broadcast as part of the television series) and then by Scatman Crothers after Buckley's death in 1960.
- Harecules Hare is a rabbit with superior intelligence. Hare had a computerized Thinking Cap and built a "Guided Muscle", a guided missile with a nose-cone in the form of a giant fist. His name could be a pun on "Hercules". He appeared in the episodes "Ben Hare" and "Harecules Hare and the Golden Fleecing".
- Ben Hare is a rabbit and father to Harecules. He was a muscular health nut who believed that brawn was more important than brains and wished that his son would feel the same way. His name could be a pun on "Ben-Hur". He appeared in the episodes "Ben Hare" and "Harecules Hare and the Golden Fleecing".
- Jacques the Knife (or "Jack the Knife") is a friendly, jazz-singing sawfish with a heavy French accent. His name was an obvious spoof of Bobby Darin's 1959 hit song "Mack the Knife". His sawlike nose is used as a sword to help Cecil defeat Dishonest John in the episode "Hero by Trade". He spoke only in song, to a rendition of "Oh My Darling, Clementine" done in the styling Bobby Darin's version of the song. He also comes to Cecil's aid in the episode "The Monstrous Monster".
- Little Ace From Outer Space is an astronaut mouse. In his self-titled episode, he was used by the people at Cape Banana Peel to discover "whether or whether there was any weather". Cecil and Dishonest John competed to get Little Ace back to the cape for a cash reward. In the episode "Rat Race From Space", he was sent in a rocket to be the first mouse on the moon only to end up in the ocean. He was voiced by Paul Frees.
- The Dreaded Three-Headed Threep
- Tear-A-Long the Dotted Lion is a muscle-bound lion obsessed with exercise and vitamins. His name is a pun of the phrase "Tear along the dotted line", but Tear-A-Long himself was not spotted. He spoke with a Southern U.S. accent similar to the Warner Brothers animated character Foghorn Leghorn. He was one of the original characters on the Time for Beany puppet show.
- Careless the Mexican Hairless is Cecil's jovial pet chihuahua, introduced in the episode "Cecil Gets Careless" and so named because of his tendency to knock things over when he happily jumps and dances. He sings to the tune of the Mexican folk song "El Jarabe Tapatio". He is called a Mexican Hairless for comic effect; the actual breed aka Xoloitzcuintle is much larger.
- William Shakespeare Wolf is a starving out-of-work wolf and actor who was a foil for Rin Tin Can (a robot dog whose rise to fame coincided with the demise of his own acting career) as well as Harecules Hare and a duck named Graham Quacker, both of whom he attempted to eat.
- Beepin' Tom is a diminutive alien who flew about in an open-top flying saucer. He is named for his habit of making beeping sounds. When he spoke, he would hum the first line of The Alphabet Song and then sing his phrase to the tune of the next line. A high pitched, accelerated voice similar to the Chipmunks was used for the character and the words he sang/spoke appeared as a rebus in a word balloon over his head. He appeared in the episodes "Ain't I a Little Stinger?" and "Strange Objects".
- Hopalong Catskill is a frog wearing a cowboy hat who walked with a limp similar to that of Dennis Weaver's "Chester" on the TV show Gunsmoke and spoke with a Yiddish accent. His catchphrase was "Hey Shmendrick! Would you like a cup of coffee?" The character was voiced by Yiddish comedy singer Mickey Katz.
- Peking Tom is a Siamese alley cat who sang about being a "very hungry guy; I've got to get some food 'cause I'm too egg-foo-young to die".
- Cora the Clinging Vine (aka Flora) is a voluptuous vine who has a crush on Cecil (who does not reciprocate her advances). She sings "groovy" and Jazz scats to Cecil as he tries to escape from her. She appeared in the episodes "Wildman From Wildsville" and "Capture of the Three-Headed Threep".
- Venus the Meanest and Venice the Menace are two space robots from Venus who at first were reported to be invading Earth but came down for a picnic. Venice the Menace's name is a play on Dennis the Menace (both the British and American versions), and acts like Linus Van Pelt from Peanuts including his thumb sucking and "dirty old" blanket. Venus the Meanest was voiced by Arlene Harris, using her Chatterbox bit, where she speaks on the phone with an unseen Maisey about her troubles with Venice's mother.
- The Robot Ants are a group of ants brought by Venus the Meanest to be part of her picnic on Earth. They sing a march based on the children's song "This Old Man" that is shown in a speech bubble.
- The Boo Birds are a gang of mischievous ghost birds that haunt an abandoned castle where Cecil stayed. They sing a tune "Filet of Soul (Sole)" based on the song "When the Saints Go Marching In". Their catchphrase was "Whyyyy not?"
- Edgar Allen Po's Shadow is a shadow man who owns the Haunted Retreat Mansion in the episode "Beany and Cecil meets the Invisible Man". He is based on Alfred Hitchcock and speaks with an accent like that of the cartoon character Elmer Fudd.
- So What and the Seven What-Knots is a dixie jazz band who performed in a jazz club in Las Vegas, Nevada to the tune of "When the Saints Go Marching In". They are based on the fairy tale, Snow White and the Seven Dwarfs. The names of the 'What-Knots' all spoofed on musicians & actors of the day, such as $tash-do (Satchmo), Elfis (Elvis Presley), Dizzy R. Nez (Desi Arnaz), Harpsie McChord (Harpo Marx), Fred McFurry (Fred MacMurray), Screw-Loose Lautrec (Henri de Toulouse-Lautrec) & Loverachi (Liberace).
- Stogie Bear is a detective bear who Beany and Cecil helped to arrest the gangster bears in the episode "The Warring 20's".
- Double Trouble Bubble Beast is a weird underwater creature who appeared in "Ain't That a Cork in the Snorkel" and "Make a Sea-Serpent Sore!"
- Dinah Saur, The Singing Dinosaur is a dinosaur named and patterned after Dinah Shore who lived on the island of No Bikini Atoll and sang to the tune of "When the Saints Go Marching In".
- Gigi is a French poodle. Featured in the episode "DJ The DJ", she repeatedly thought she was being summoned by Cecil each time he would utter the "R-A-G-G" portion of the song "Rag Mop".
- Baby Ruthy is Beany's girlfriend, who appears in "Beany Blows His Top" and "Beany Flips His Lid". As he leaves to meet her, Huffenpuff tells him "You dine ashore..." (yet another Dinah Shore reference).
- Bridget the Crow is Crowy's girlfriend and appears in "Beany Blows His Top".
- U.S. Male is a postal ship and a boyfriend of the Leakin' Lena, who appears in "Beany Blows His Top".
- Ida is Huffenpuff's girlfriend and appears in just one episode, but is referenced in others.
- The Fleastone Kops are the cops who assisted Detective Fido Vance when The Pincher kidnapped actress Bridgette Bow Wow.
- Snorky is a mischievous serpent tied to many dubious historical events.

== Credits ==
- Executive producer: A.C.R. Stone
- Producer: Bob Clampett
- Animation directors: Jack Hannah, Dick Kinney
- Story material/storyboards: Bob Clampett, Eddie Maxwell, Al Bertino, Jack Bonestell, Dale Hale, Lloyd Turner
- Layout: Terrell Stapp, Willie Ito, Tony Sgroi, Homer Jonas
- Master animator: Art Scott
- Animators: Lou Appet, Harry "Bud" Hester, Bill Nunes, Al Stetter, Frank Gonzales, Bill Southwood, Carl A. Bell
- Backgrounds: Curtiss Perkins, Robert Abrams, Marie Reed
- Music underscore: Bob Clampett, Sody Clampett, Hoyt Curtin, Jack Roberts
- Music published by Merrifield Music Co., Inc. (ASCAP)
- Production assistants: Dick Elliott, John Soh, Jeanne Thorpe, Mike Sweeten
- Voice talents of Jim MacGeorge, Irv Shoemaker and Bob Clampett as Cecil.
- A Bob Clampett Production, in association with Television Artists and Producers Corporation

The credits of the series did not show traditional job titles, but pictorial symbols indicating their jobs. Bob Clampett's writing credit was indicated by a typewriter typing out the words "...by Bob Clampett", for instance. Clampett also made sure to include his name in the lyrics of the often-repeated B&C theme song to gain more recognition with viewers and from the animation industry. Clampett finally got the rights from ABC to market his Beany and Cecil cartoons by video during the 1980s.

== Episodes ==
No.	Title	Original release date
1	"Spots Off a Leopard" "Invasion of Earth by Robots" "Cecil Meets the Singing Dinasor"	January 6, 1962
2	"Little Ace from Outer Space" "Super Cecil" "Wildman from Wildsville"	January 13, 1962
3	"Davey Crickett" "Strange Objects" "The Capture of Tear-a-long the Dotted Lion"	January 20, 1962
4	"A Trip to the Schmoon" "Grime Doesn't Pay" "Beany's Buffalo Hunt"	January 27, 1962
5	"Beany Meets the Monstrous Monster" "Tommy Hawk" "Yo Ho and a Bubble of Gum"	February 3, 1962
6	"7th Voyage of Singood" "Cecil Meets Cecilia" "The Capture of Thunderbolt the Wondercolt"	February 10, 1962
7	"Rat Race for Space" "Beany & the Boo Birds" "Beany and Cecil Meet Ping Pong"	February 17, 1962
8	"Greatest Shmoe on Earth" "Beany and Cecil Meet Billy the Squid" "Capture of the 3-Headed Threep"	February 24, 1962
9	"Beany & the Jackstalk" "Humbug" "Custard's Last Stand"	March 3, 1962
10	"Hero by Trade" "Illegal Eagle Egg" "Cecil Gets Careless"	March 10, 1962
11	"Sleeping Beauty & the Beast" "Quackers in Bed" "D.J. Meets Cowboy Starr"	March 17, 1962
12	"Beany's Beany Cap Copter" "Indiscreet Squeet" "Phantom of the Horse Opera"	March 24, 1962
13	"20,000 Little Leaguers" "Malice in Blunderland" "Buffalo Billy"	March 31, 1962
14	"Dirty Birdy" "The Attack of the Man Eater Skeeters" "Leading Lady Bug"	April 7, 1962
15	"Rin Tin Can" "Vild Vast Vasteland" "Invisible Man Has Butterfingers"	April 14, 1962
16	"Here Comes the Schmoeboat" "T'ain't Cricket, Crickett" "Cecil Always Saves the Day"	April 21, 1962
17	"Ain't I a Little Stinger" "Warring 20's" "B & C Meet Invisible Man"	April 28, 1962
18	"Ain't That a Cork In the Snorkel?" "Makes a Sea-Serpent Sore" "So What & 7 Whatnots"	May 5, 1962
19	"Cecil's Comical Strip" "Beany's Resid-jewels" "Wot the Heck"	May 12, 1962
20	"Dragon Train" "10-Foot Tall and Wet" "Dirty Pool"	May 19, 1962
21	"Thumb Fun" "Living Doll" "Beanyland"	May 26, 1962
22	"Beany Blows His Top" "Beany Flips His Lid" "Fleastone Kop Caper"	June 2, 1962
23	"Mad Isle of Mad-hatten" "Hammy Awards" "Hare-cules & the Golden Fleecing"	June 9, 1962
24	"Cheery Cheery Beany" "Nya-Ha Ha!" "Swingin' Singin' Sea Serpent"	June 16, 1962
25	"There Goes a Good Squid" "Ben Hare" "Hare Today, Gone Tomorrow"	June 23, 1962
26	"Oil's Well That Ends Well" "There's No Such Thing as a Sea Serpent" "D.J. the Dee Jay"	June 30, 1962

== History ==
Beany and Cecil was created by animator Bob Clampett after he quit Warner Bros. Cartoons, where he had been directing cartoon shorts. Clampett is said to have originated the idea for Cecil when he was a boy after seeing the top half of the dinosaur swimming from the water at the end of the 1925 film The Lost World.

Clampett originally created the idea as a television series named Time for Beany, which was broadcast from February 28, 1949, to 1955. Time for Beany, a puppet show, featured the talents of veteran voice actors Stan Freberg as Cecil and Dishonest John, and Daws Butler as Beany and Uncle Captain.

Clampett revived the series in theatrical animated form, though Freberg and Butler did not reprise their roles. On October 11, 1959, the animated series was introduced as Matty's Funday Funnies, named for "Matty Mattel" the animated spokesperson for its primary sponsor Mattel Toys company, but the series at that time featured old Paramount theatrical cartoons. The new Beany and Cecil cartoon series took over Matty's Funnies (sans "Funday") in January 1962 and was broadcast prime time Saturdays during the remainder of the 1961-62 television season, by the ABC Television Network. The newer cartoons replaced the Famous Studios cartoons of Casper the Friendly Ghost and Little Audrey among other parts of Matty's Funday Funnies. The program was later retitled The Beany and Cecil Show.

After 1962, the 26 shows (including 78 cartoons) were repeated during Saturday mornings for the next two years and on Sunday mornings for three more. The cartoon featured characters Beany, a boy, and Cecil the Sea-Sick Sea Serpent embarking on a series of adventures, often to discover ancient civilizations and artifacts. These escapades were rife with cartoon slapstick and puns.

Before the animated series, but concurrent with the puppet show, Clampett created a comic book series of Beany and Cecil adventures for Dell Comics. The artwork for this series of comics, published from 1951 to 1954, was drawn by Jack Bradbury.

In 1988, the show was revived as The New Adventures of Beany and Cecil by DIC Entertainment. Only eight episodes were made, and only five episodes broadcast. This version of the show was produced and directed by John Kricfalusi, who would later create The Ren & Stimpy Show, and made use of voices from Billy West, who also did voices for the characters Ren (for season 3 and later) and Stimpy.

== Music ==
Cecil often sang the Ames Brothers' song "Rag Mop" throughout the series. One episode ("Beanyland") featured Tchaikovsky's well-known celesta piece, Dance of the Sugarplum Fairy, from The Nutcracker. Other famed pieces of The Nutcracker were used in the series as musical interludes such as the Chinese Dance and Dance of the Reed-Flutes. Many other well-known classical music pieces were featured in the show as well, including William Tell Overture (in the episodes "Beanyland" and "The Phantom of the Horse Opera"), Ride of the Valkyries and Flight of the Bumblebee. Some of the background music was also recycled from Leave It to Beaver, as well as some early Walter Lantz cartoons and incidental music from The Alvin Show. "The Can Can" was used in the episode "Harecules Hare & The Golden Fleecing" as the music for the Guided Muscle. The tune of "When The Saints Go Marching In" was used in several episodes, by the Singing Dinosaur, So What & and Seven What-Knots, and the Boo Birds.

== Influence ==
The AC/DC song "Dirty Deeds Done Dirt Cheap" is titled after the business cards of character Dishonest John, which read "Dirty deeds done dirt cheap. Holidays, Sundays and special rates".

Bob Dylan painted Beany in his 2017 Beaten Path painting Hamburger Stand, Long Beach, based on a home movie of Beany's Drive-in Restaurant in 1952.

In Marvel Comics, there is a spacefaring Imperial Guard unit, with a member code named Warstar, who consists of two separate aliens named "B'nee" and "C'cil".

The puppet origins and the form of Cecil inspired the famous science fiction author Larry Niven to invent an extraterrestrial race called Pierson's Puppeteer as part of his Known Space series of novels and short stories (as originally stated in the story "The Soft Weapon".

Beany and Cecil was also an inspiration for Joel Hodgson to create the show Mystery Science Theater 3000.

== Home media ==
The entire series was released on VHS and Betamax as thirteen volumes (each containing two episodes) by RCA/Columbia Pictures Home Video in 1984, with the final releases issued by their "Magic Window" children's subsidiary imprint.

Image Entertainment released "Bob Clampett's Beany and Cecil the Special Edition" DVD in 2000, with 12 cartoon shorts and various show bumpers remastered from their original 35mm camera negatives. Bonus features included four complete episodes of Time for Beany, audio tracks of original story sessions, backstage footage, lost animated works from Bob Clampett's studio, and a still gallery. After a considerable delay, Volume 2 was released by Hen's Tooth Entertainment during 2009, containing 11 cartoon shorts, plus two more Time for Beany episodes, archival audio interviews with Bob Clampett, video interviews with celebrity fans of the series as well as animator Bill Melendez, original bumpers from Matty's Funday Funnies and other special features. To date, the entire cartoon collection has not been released on DVD or Blu-ray disc, nor has it been made available for digital download.
