= Sid Raymond =

American actor (1909–2006)

- Born: Raymond Silverstein; January 21, 1909; Manhattan, New York, US
- Died: December 1, 2006 (aged 97); Aventura, Florida, US
- Occupations: Actor, comedian
- Years active: 1935–2006
- Spouse: Dorothy Naftel

Sid Raymond (born Raymond Silverstein, January 21, 1909 – December 1, 2006) was an American comedian and character actor.

== Early years ==
Born Raymond Silverstein in Manhattan, Raymond dropped out of New York University and became the recreation director at a resort in the Catskills.

== Career ==
Raymond traveled for the radio program Major Bowes Amateur Hour, seeking talented people across the United States. He also entertained military troops during World War II and, in 1950, portrayed Finnegan in the Duffy's Tavern radio show.

He appeared in many films and commercials, and was active nearly until his death. He is probably best remembered as being the voice for Baby Huey. In addition, Raymond did the voice for Katnip the cat of Herman and Katnip fame (Katnip also appeared in several Buzzy the Crow cartoons). He was also one of several actors (notably Dayton Allen) who voiced magpies Heckle and Jeckle. His first cartoon was in the Little Lulu cartoon Lulu's Indoor Outing. On radio, Raymond was "Finnegan" on Duffy's Tavern during its final seasons. He returned to play the character of Baby Huey in The Baby Huey Show in the 1990s, though he was replaced by Joe Alaskey in the show's second season.

On Broadway, Raymond portrayed Candy Butcher in Something About a Soldier (1962) and Mr. Diamond in Golden Rainbow (1968).

The short documentary Sid at 90 was about Raymond.

== Personal life and death ==
Raymond was married to the former Dorothy Naftel for 69 years. He died in Aventura, Florida, aged 97, where he lived with his wife, from complications of a stroke the week before.

== Filmography ==
Year	Title	Role	Notes
1952	Anything Can Happen	Employment Agency Clerk	Uncredited
1955	I Am a Camera	First Man	Uncredited
1956	Somebody Up There Likes Me	Subway Guard	Uncredited
1956	Fright	Van Driver	
1957	Four Boys and a Gun	Cab driver	
1958	The Goddess	Second Man	Uncredited
1961	The Hustler	First Man	Uncredited
1963	The Prize	Actor	Uncredited
1979	Hot Stuff	Dog Trainer	
1981	The Funhouse	Strip Show MC	
1983	Easy Money	Bet Taker	
1987	Making Mr. Right	Manny	
1989	Let It Ride	Solly Friedman	
1992	Folks!	Retired Attorney	
1994	My Father the Hero	Elderly Guest	
1995	Two Much	The Lincoln Brigade	
2002	Big Trouble	Retiree #2	
