= The New Adventures of Beany and Cecil =

American animated television series

- Title card
- Genre: Animation
- Created by: John Kricfalusi
- Based on: Beany and Cecil by Bob Clampett
- Developed by: John Kricfalusi
- Written by: George Atkins; Paul Dini; Rowby Goren; Wayne Kline; Chuck Lorre
- Directed by: Eddie Fitzgerald; William H. Frake III; John Kricfalusi; Jim Smith; Bruce Timm
- Voices of: Billy West; Jim MacGeorge; Maurice LaMarche; Mark Hildreth
- Theme music composer: Bob Clampett; Sody Clampett
- Composers: Udi Harpaz; Jim Mandell
- Country of origin: United States
- Original language: English
- No. of seasons: 1
- No. of episodes: 13 (8 unaired)

Production
- Executive producers: Harriet Beck; Sody Clampett; Andy Heyward
- Producer: John Kricfalusi
- Running time: 30 min
- Production companies: DIC Animation City; Bob Clampett Productions

Original release
- Network: ABC
- Release: September 10 – October 8, 1988

Related
- Beany and Cecil

The New Adventures of Beany and Cecil is an American animated series. Produced by DIC Animation City, it is a revival of Bob Clampett's Beany and Cecil. Five half-hour episodes aired out of the thirteen in production during its original run. This short-lived incarnation of the show was developed, produced, and directed by Canadian animator John Kricfalusi, later known for founding Spümcø and creating The Ren & Stimpy Show.

== Cast ==
- Mark Hildreth – Beany
- Maurice LaMarche – Dishonest John, King Muckamuck (in "The Framed Freep"), Film Director (in "Cecil Meets Clambo")
- Jim MacGeorge – Captain Horatio Huffenpuff
- Billy West – Cecil, Dentist (in "Radio with a Bite"), DJ (in "Radio with a Bite"), Brotherhood of B.L.E.C.H. Member (in "Brotherhood of B.L.E.C.H."), Pinocchio (in "D.J.'s Disappearing Act"), Clambo (in "Cecil Meets Clambo"), Movie Trailer Announcer (in "Cecil Meets Clambo"), Head Waitress (in "The Golden Menu")

=== Additional voices ===
- Jane Mortfee
- Laura Harris
- Cree Summer-Francks

== Episodes ==
Thirteen half-hours were proposed, but only the first five were broadcast:

No.	Title	Directed by	Written by	Original release date
1	"The Framed Freep"	John Kricfalusi	Chuck Lorre	September 10, 1988
Captain Huffenpuff leads Beany and Cecil on a mission to King Muckamuck of the tropical islands of Howareya to capture a three-headed monster called the Freep who is menacing them. When they arrive, King Muckamuck's daughter Princess Princess claims that the Freep would not normally attack them, causing Beany and Cecil to investigate. They eventually find the Freep is actually a giant robot piloted by Dishonest John in his plot to turn the island into a vacation resort for evildoers called Club Bad. Note: During the "Club Bad" part of the episode, there are bad guys who are parodies of Doctor Doom, Joker, Frankenstein's Monster, Red Skull, Doctor Octopus, Jason Voorhees, Darth Vader, and Ming the Merciless.
2a	"Radio with a Bite!"	Eddie Fitzgerald	George Atkins	September 17, 1988
Beany takes Cecil to the dentist to deal with a toothache. As Cecil waits for the dentist to return, Dishonest John poses as a nurse in order to place a radio receiver in Cecil's mouth in order to make Cecil think that he is listening to his conscience. With the radio receiver in place, DJ makes Cecil commit various crimes as it also picks up a radio station.
2b	"The Brotherhood of B.L.E.C.H."	Jim Smith	Chuck Lorre	September 17, 1988
Dishonest John is shown to be a member of the Brotherhood of B.L.E.C.H. (short for Bad Guys, Losers, Evildoers, Crooks, and Horrible People). After getting a letter from them about cancelling his membership if he does not prove his bad ways, he is approached by some Brotherhood of B.L.E.C.H. members who will judge him and do a painful way of cancelling his membership. When his attempts to bring doom to the Leakin' Lena fail and DJ is given one final chance to prove himself, they are overheard by Beany who suggests to Cecil and Huffenpuff to act like they are in danger to have the Brotherhood of B.L.E.C.H. members impressed with DJ.
3a	"The Bad Guy Flu!"	Jim Smith	Rowby Goren	September 24, 1988
Dishonest John gets the bad guy flu. He has to stay on the Leakin' Lena and be taken care of by Beany and Cecil until he gets better. Meanwhile, he tries to steal Captain Huffenpuff's top secret box.
3b	"D.J.'s Disappearing Act"	Eddie Fitzgerald	Chuck Lorre	September 24, 1988
Captain Huffenpuff invents an invisibility paint which he demonstrates to Beany and Cecil, but it lasts for a few minutes. Dishonest John steals the invisibility paint in a plot to steal the Humongous Diamond that Captain Huffenpuff previously discovered and is on display at the Metropolitan Museum of Big Things.
4a	"Cecil Meets Clambo"	Eddie Fitzgerald	Paul Dini	October 1, 1988
During a date with Cecilia at the drive-in theater, Cecil has a run-in with the clam movie star Clambo who invites Cecilia to be in his next movie. Taking advantage of Cecil working to get strong like Clambo, Dishonest John uses an Instant Muscle Kit to "help" Cecil. Dishonest John's "attempt" causes Cecil to crash into the giant penguin robot used for Clambo's movie causing it to go on a rampage. When Cecilia is in danger, Cecil must work to save her.
4b	"The Golden Menu"	Jim Smith	Rowby Goren	October 1, 1988
Beany, Cecil, Captain Huffenpuff and Crowy travel to the Soup and Sandwich Island in search of the legendary Golden Menu which will give its owner any food they order. Dishonest John tries to steal the Menu while the Leakin' Lena crew is captured by savages. Captain Huffenpuff is mistaken for the mythical Great Customer.
5	"The Courtship of Cecilia"	Bruce Timm	Paul Dini	October 8, 1988
Cecil is prepared to tell Cecilia how much he loves her as he heads to her island home. Dishonest John plans to ruin Cecil's love life by posing as Cecilia and sabotaging his chances.
6a	"D.J. Goes Ape"	Eddie Fitzgerald	Paul Dini	N/A
6b	"Momma Cecil"	Bruce Timm	Tom Moore, Phil Kellard and Wayne Kline	N/A
7a	"May the Best Man Ribbet"	John Kricfalusi and Eddie Fitzgerald	David Wise	N/A
7b	"On Your Mark, Get Set, B.L.E.C.H."	Jim Smith	Buzz Dixon	N/A
8a	"Cecil's Twin Brother"	William H. Frake III	George Atkins	N/A
8b	"Rampage of the Robot Arms"	TBD	Stephen Langford	N/A
9a	"Bedtime for Beany"	Eddie Fitzgerald (as Fenwick Birdwhistle)	Doug Molitor	N/A
9b	"Super Cecil Meets Thunderbolt"	William H. Frake III	Gordon Kent	N/A
10a	"Eggs Marks the Spot"	Eddie Fitzgerald (as Fenwick Birdwhistle)	Mark Edward Edens	N/A
10b	"Claws for Alarm"	TBD	Brynne Stephens	N/A
10c	"Who Tamed Looney Lemur?"	William H. Frake III	Jack Enyart	N/A
11a	"Color Me D.J."	TBD	Eddie Gorodetsky and Billy West (?)	N/A
11b	"Cecil the Singing Sea Serpent"	John Kricfalusi	Paul Dini	N/A
12	"Untitled Compilation Episode"	John Kricfalusi	Paul Dini	N/A
13	"Cecil's Birthday"	John Kricfalusi	Paul Dini and Beth Bronstein	N/A

== Production ==
ABC had been negotiating for the production of the show with the Clampett family, who insisted that John Kricfalusi, a devoted fan and friend of Bob Clampett, be part of the production. The program was part of a 1988 initiative at ABC to reintroduce legacy characters older children or their parents would recognize (A Pup Named Scooby-Doo and The New Adventures of Winnie the Pooh were among the other new cartoons that fall), specifically Nielsen's introduction of the people meter for rating larger market audiences over diaries, which the network blamed for the failure of shows aired in 1987–88 such as The Little Clowns of Happytown and Care Bears the year before. The long negotiations delayed the start of production to mid-July, causing much of the animation to be rushed in order to meet the September deadline.

Tensions rose between Kricfalusi and ABC over the tone of the show, leading to an uncomfortable atmosphere for the show's crew. The more ABC tried to soften up the show, the more Kricfalusi pushed for shocking and offensive material. Clampett's widow Sody insisted on having non-animation writers edit the stories, hiring a despondent Chuck Lorre, who was affected by the 1988 Writers Guild of America strike and could only find animation work, to edit the stories and provide stock music; he had rejected a similar offer for the series previously. Despite gaining support from ABC for his attempts to tone down Kricfalusi's crude humor, he was immediately shunned by practically everyone else involved for the quality of his work and lack of passion. He was fired after an argument with Sody and Rob Clampett over this regard after complaints from crew members, with his work remaining unused. Future Spümcø animators Eddie Fitzgerald and Jim Smith, alongside Bruce Timm, were allowed their first directorial roles.

The Clampett family were ultimately not happy with the cartoon, but remained supportive of Kricfalusi. ABC cancelled the show after a handful of episodes as they found the humor not suitable for children's programming, nor that audience finding interest in the series altogether. As a result, ABC replaced it with reruns of Hanna-Barbera's The Flintstone Kids, a series that had originally been planned to be retired following its two-season run.
