= AMVETS =

American military veterans organization

American Veterans
- Official logo
- Abbreviation: AMVETS
- Established: December 10, 1944
- Type: Veterans' organization
- Legal status: Federally chartered corporation
- Headquarters: 3011 Hubbard Rd., Hyattsville, Maryland
- Region served: Worldwide
- Members: 250,000 (2024)
- Executive Director: Joseph Chenelly
- National Commander: Paul Shipley (2025–2026)
- Main organ: National Convention
- Publication: The American Veteran
- Subsidiaries: AMVETS National Service Foundation; AMVETS Ladies Auxiliary; Sons of AMVETS; Junior AMVETS; AMVETS Riders; "Sad Sacks"; "Sackettes"
- Website: amvets.org
- Formerly called: American Veterans of World War II, Korea, and Vietnam

American Veterans (AMVETS) is a non-partisan, volunteer-led organization formed by World War II veterans of the United States military. It advocates for its members as well as for causes that its members deem helpful to the nation at large. The group holds a Federal charter under Title 36 of the United States Code. It is a 501(c)19 organization.

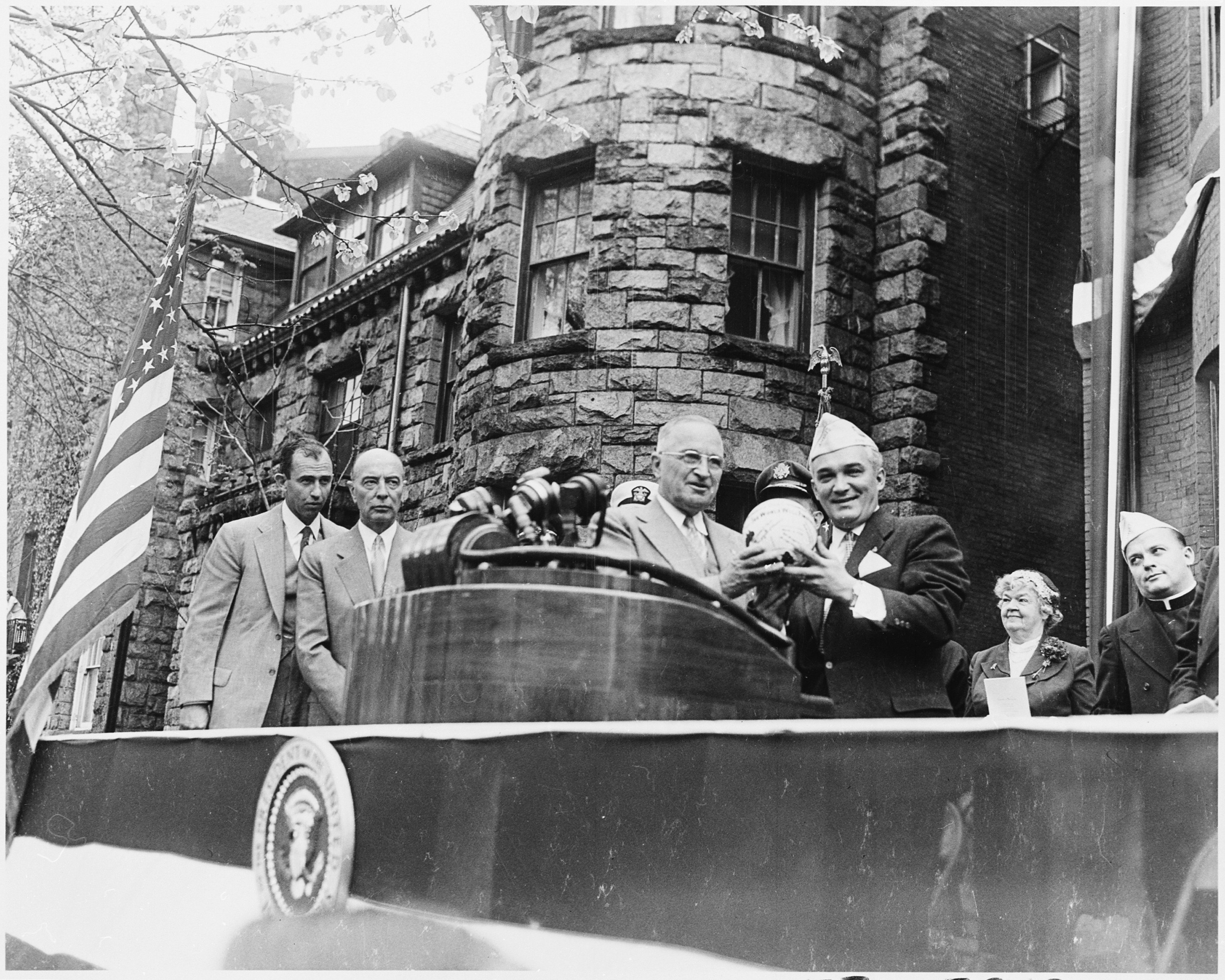
President Harry Truman at AMVETS headquarters dedication

== History ==
In December 1944 twelve small groups of World War II veterans met in Kansas City and formed AMVETS. A year later there were 20,000 memberships and 200 Amvets posts.

Originally only World War II veterans were eligible to join, and the organization's stated goals were:

1. Full employment for veterans
2. Working for veterans' rights
3. Influencing national issues that benefit the United States
4. Gaining recognition of veterans' needs
5. Maintaining friendships made during military service
6. Keeping alive the ideals veterans fought for

== Change in membership requirements ==
In 1966 AMVETS requested Congress to amend their charter so that veterans of the Korean War and the Vietnam conflict could join, and President Lyndon Johnson signed the bill changing eligibility dates for AMVETS membership. Then in 1984 President Ronald Reagan signed a public law that amended AMVETS charter to open membership to all honorably discharged veterans.

== Harold Russell's terms as National Commander ==
Harold Russell, the handless World War II veteran and Academy Award winner for The Best Years of Our Lives, served three terms as National Commander in the 1950s. As head of AMVETS, Russell wrote to President Harry S. Truman in 1951 supporting his decision to dismiss General Douglas MacArthur during the Korean War.

Russell's telegram to Truman cited MacArthur's "repeated insubordination in violation of basic American principles governing civil versus military authority." His telegram said those were "obvious grounds" to relieve MacArthur. Erle Cocke Jr., commander of the American Legion, said that he was "shocked by the news" that AMVETS and the American Veterans Committee supported MacArthur's firing.

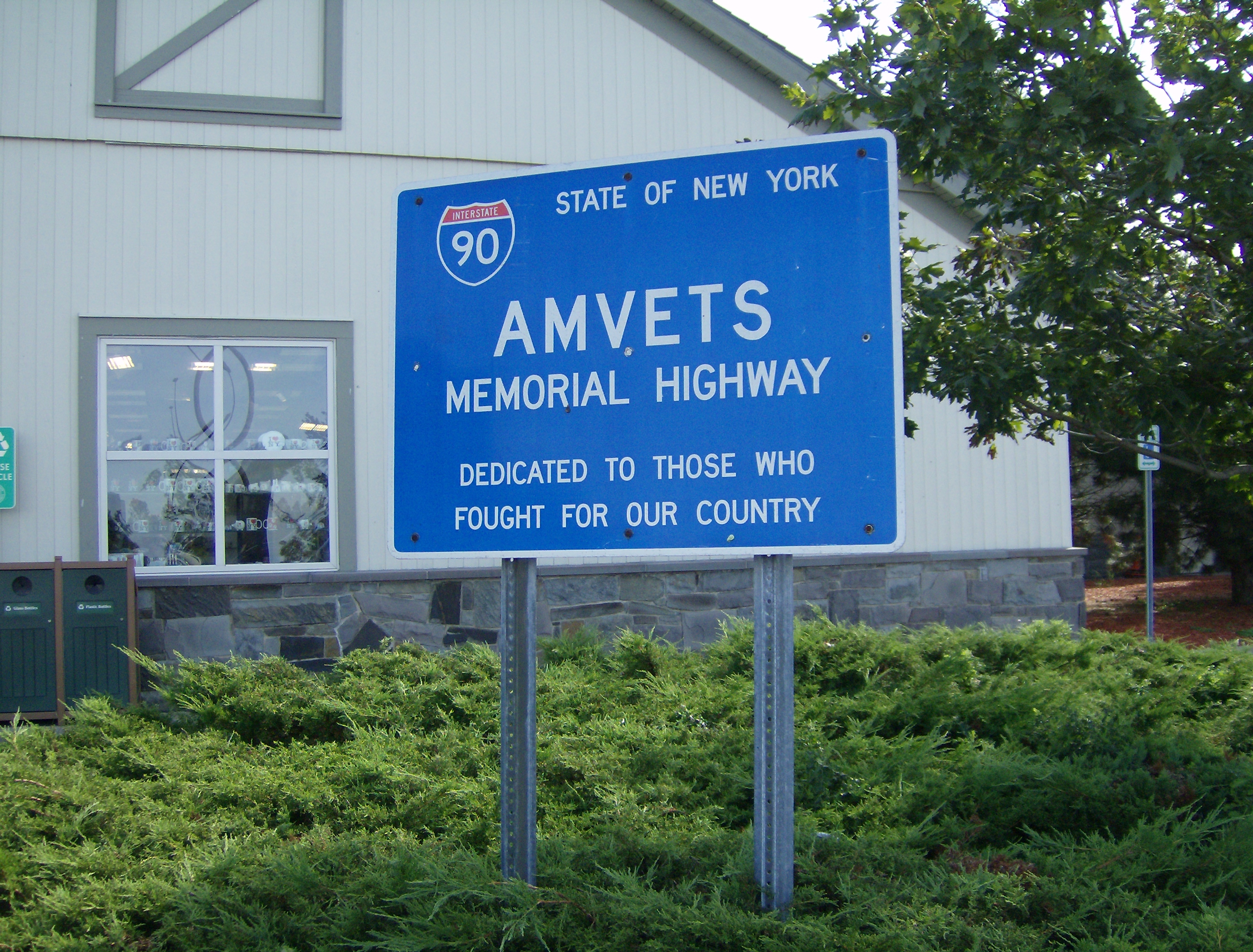
AMVETS memorial sign on the New York State Thruway

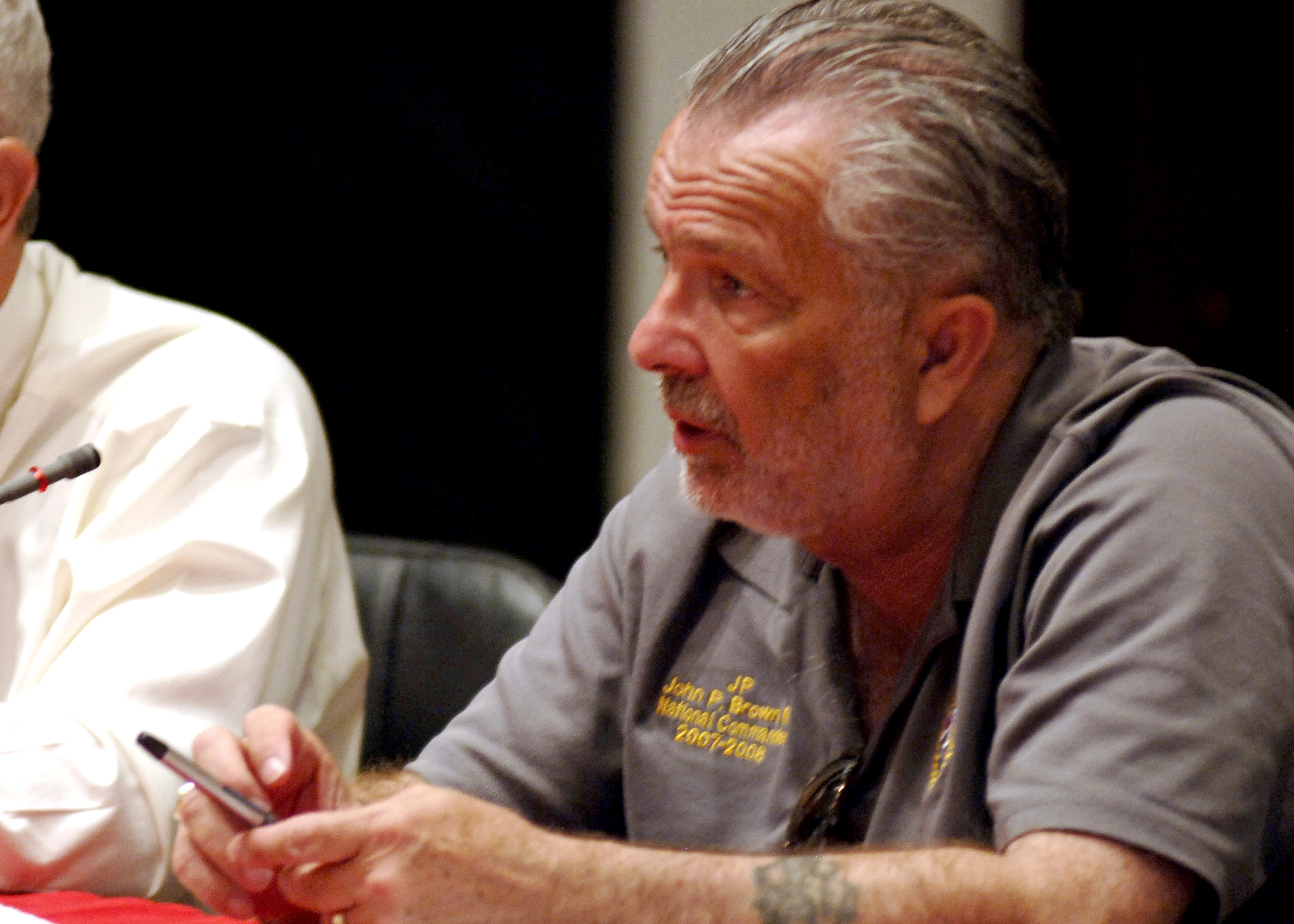
John "J.P." Brown III, national commander, AMVETS, 2008

== Awards ==
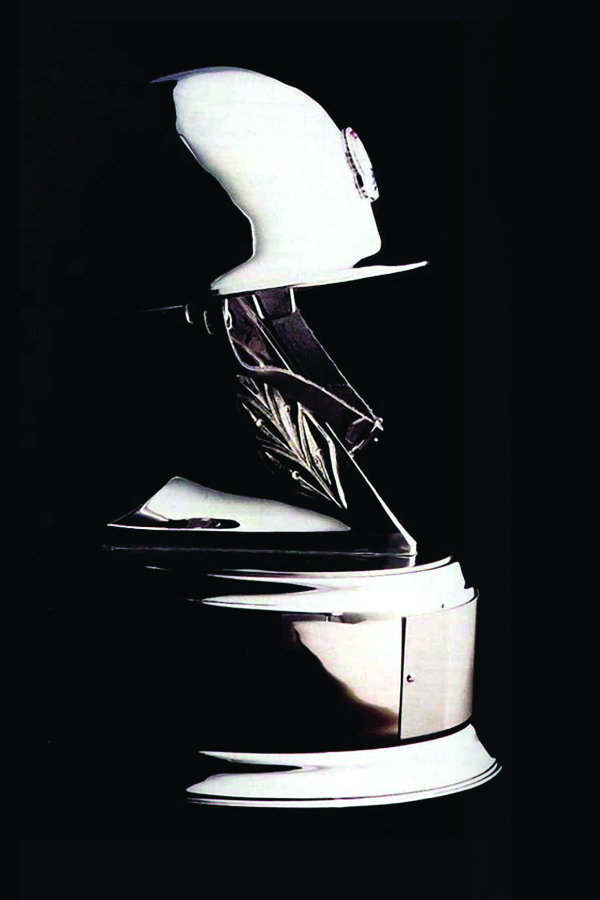
The prestigious "Silver Helmet Award" or "Veteran's Oscar"

AMVETS presents its annual Silver Helmet Awards to "recognize excellence and achievement in Americanism, defense, rehabilitation, congressional service and other fields." Current Silver Helmet Recipient, John Henry Felix, August 2022

Past Silver Helmet Recipients include:

President Harry S. Truman, 1958 for Americanism

President Dwight Eisenhower, 1959 for Peace

Vice President Richard Nixon, 1960 for Americanism

Senate Majority Leader Lyndon Johnson, 1960 for Americanism

Eleanor Roosevelt, 1962 for Peace

Henry Kissinger, 1972 for Peace

Pope Paul VI, 1981 for Peace

Lee Greenwood, August 1988 for Americanism

General Colin Powell, 1991 for Defense

Governor Tim Walz, 2010 for Americanism

Tom Donwen, AMVETS Post 56, California, 2019 for Rehabilitation

https://www.ohamvets.org/single-post/amvets-silver-helmet-award-honorees-to-be-announced-live-thursday-night

https://www.bluestemprairie.com/bluestemprairie/2010/02/walzgetsamvetssilvehelmet.html

== Nursing scholarships ==
In 1945 the AMVETS National Sad Sacks were formed to raise money for the Sad Sacks Nursing Scholarship Fund. The scholarships, named after George Baker’s Sad Sack cartoon character, are awarded to children of military veterans.

== See also ==
- Veterans Day
- American Legion
- Veterans of Foreign Wars
