= Fred Rhoads =

American cartoonist

Promotional photograph of Rhoads

Fred Rhoads (October 17, 1921 – February 26, 2000) was an American cartoonist best known for his contributions to George Baker's Sad Sack.

Born in Shamokin, Pennsylvania, Rhoads studied illustration in New York from 1940 to 1942, at which time he joined the U.S. Marine Corps to serve during World War II. He drew the Gismo and Eight Ball cartoon series in the Marine's Leatherneck Magazine. He also assisted several cartoonists, including Mort Walker (Beetle Bailey), Jimmy Hatlo (They'll Do It Every Time) and Fred Lasswell (Barney Google and Snuffy Smith).

In 1954, Harvey Comics and Baker brought in Paul McCarthy to draw the Sad Sack titles, followed by Rhoads, Jack O'Brien and Joe Dennett. Others who periodically drew for the titles included Warren Kremer and Ken Selig. Baker retained editorial control and continued to illustrate the covers of Sad Sack comics until his death in 1975. During the three decades Rhoads drew Sad Sack, he also did several spin-off features, including Gabby Gob and The Sarge.

During the 1980s and early 1990s Fred Rhoads worked as an editorial cartoonist for the Tucson Citizen in Arizona.

Rhoads, who suffered from Alzheimer's disease, died February 20, 2000, in Greenwood, South Carolina.
