= The Baby Huey Show =

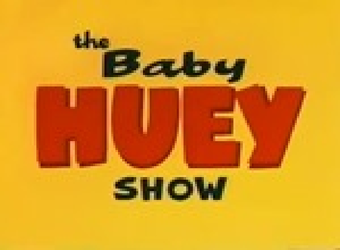
- Genre: Comedy
- Based on: Baby Huey by Martin Taras
- Developed by: Bob Jaques
- Creative director: Bill Kopp
- Voices of: Sid Raymond; Michael Sicoly; Maxine Miller; Billy West; Joe Alaskey (season 2)
- Composers: Peter Berring (season 1); Harvey Cohen (season 2)
- Countries of origin: United States; Canada (season 1)
- Original language: English
- No. of seasons: 2
- No. of episodes: 26

Production
- Executive producer: Jeffrey Montgomery
- Producers: Kelly Armstrong (season 1); Bob Jaques (season 1); Heidi Newell (season 1); Tom Klein (season 2); Victoria Jenson (season 2)
- Production companies: Carbunkle Cartoons (season 1); Universal/Harvey Animation Studios (season 2); The Harvey Entertainment Company

Original release
- Network: Syndication
- Release: September 17, 1994 – December 9, 1995

The Baby Huey Show is an animated television series that ran in syndication during the 1994–95 and 1995–96 TV seasons. The show featured the Harvey Comics character Baby Huey. 26 episodes were produced by combining old theatrical Famous Studios cartoons and new made-for-TV shorts. These were the first Baby Huey cartoons since the 1959 theatrical cartoon Huey's Father's Day. In the first season, Sid Raymond voiced Huey, reprising his role for the final time.

The first season was produced by Carbunkle Cartoons, a company that did animation on selected episodes of The Ren & Stimpy Show for seasons one and two. Each episode usually consisted of a new 8-minute short followed by two classic Harveytoons (the first featuring Herman and Katnip and the second featuring Baby Huey) and a clip from another classic Harveytoon.

The second season was produced by Universal/Harvey Animation Studios and thus had different writers and directors (Pat Ventura chief among them). Joe Alaskey was cast in the title role, instead of original star Sid Raymond from the first season who had originated the voice in 1949. In addition to a new Baby Huey short, each episode contained an uncredited "Richie Rich Gems" vignette, featuring Richie Rich with guest appearances by Reggie, Tiny, Pee-Wee, Freckles, Cadbury, Professor Keenbean, Gloria and Dollar. One Baby Huey television cartoon from the first season was also rebroadcast during each second-season episode. Each episode also contained a theatrical Baby Huey or Herman and Katnip cartoon from Famous Studios.

== Plot ==
As in the original Famous Studios and Paramount shorts, a large, dimwitted baby duck wreaks havoc on those who he comes in contact with, as his attempts to help and/or play result in hilarious consequences. Huey is often unaware of the havoc he is causing, maintaining an innocence even as a hungry fox attempts—and fails—to eat him.

== Voice actors ==
=== Main ===
- Sid Raymond as Baby Huey (season 1)
- Joe Alaskey as Baby Huey (season 2), additional voices
- Michael Sicoly as Papa (season 1), additional voices
- Kevin Schon as Papa (season 2)
- Billy West as the Fox (season 1), additional voices
- Greg Burson as the Fox (season 2)
- Maxine Miller as Mama (season 1)
- Russi Taylor as Mama (season 2)

=== Additional voices ===
- Orlando Ashley (season 2)
- Kathleen Barr (season 1)
- Nancy Casalese (season 1)
- Garry Chalk (season 1)
- Mandy Cumbie (season 1)
- Marcy Goldberg (season 1)
- Phil Hayes (season 1)
- Matt Hill (season 1)
- Bob Jaques (season 1)
- Terry Klassen (season 1)
- Scott McNeil (season 1)
- Rob Morton (season 1)
- John Payne (season 1)
- Thurl Ravenscroft (season 2)
- Will Ryan (season 1)
- Rico Zorman (season 1)

== Episodes ==
=== Series overview ===
Season	Episodes	Originally released	
Season	Episodes	First released	Last released
1	13	September 17, 1994	December 10, 1994
2	13	September 16, 1995	December 9, 1995

=== Season 1 (1994) ===
No. overall	No. in season	Title	Directed by	Written by	Storyboard by	Original release date	Prod. code
1	1	"Hard Hat Huey"	Bob Jaques	Bob Jaques & Kelly Armstrong	Mauro Casalese	September 17, 1994	101
Papa takes Huey to teach him how to work on a skyscraper but Huey often breaks everything, much to the boss' annoyance. This episode originally aired with "Ship A-Hooey" (Herman and Katnip), "Swab the Duck" (a Noveltoon featuring Baby Huey) and a brief clip from "Mouse Trapeze" (Herman and Katnip).
2	2	"A Dog Days Night?"	Ron Zorman	Henry Gilroy	Ron Zorman	September 24, 1994	102
When a robber escapes from the jail with the police after him, he disguises himself in Baby Huey's plush puppy. Believing that his plush puppy is alive, he takes care of him. This episode originally aired with "Mouseum" (Herman and Katnip), "One Quack Mind" (a Noveltoon featuring Baby Huey), and a brief clip from "Cat Tamale" (a Noveltoon featuring Herman and Katnip).
3	3	"Beach Blanket Baby"	Kelly Armstrong	Bob Jaques, Kelly Armstrong, Ron Zorman & Mauro Casalese	Myron Born	October 1, 1994	103
Papa and Huey go to the beach. Papa tries to prevent Huey from dangerous things but he always gets in trouble. This episode originally aired with "Mouse Trapeze" (Herman and Katnip), "Clown on the Farm" (a Noveltoon featuring Baby Huey) and a brief clip from "Katnip's Big Day" (Herman and Katnip).
4	4	"Duck Outdoors"	Ron Zorman	Bob Jaques, Kelly Armstrong, Ron Zorman & Mauro Casalese	Ron Zorman	October 8, 1994	104
Baby Huey and Papa go out for camping. This episode originally aired with "Cat Carson Rides Again" (a Noveltoon featuring Herman and Katnip), "Git Along Lil' Duckie" (a Noveltoon featuring Baby Huey) and "Fun on Furlough" (Herman and Katnip).
5	5	"Alien Abducktion"	Kelly Armstrong	Bob Jaques, Kelly Armstrong, Ron Zorman & Mauro Casalese	Kelly Armstrong	October 15, 1994	105
An alien takes Huey in his flying saucer. This episode originally aired with "Herman the Catoonist" (Herman and Katnip), "Cock-a-Doodle Dino" (a Noveltoon featuring Danny Dinosaur) and a brief clip from "Cat Carson Rides Again" (a Noveltoon featuring Herman and Katnip).
6	6	"Fowl Photography"	Bob Jaques	Bob Jaques, Kelly Armstrong, Ron Zorman & Mauro Casalese	Mauro Casalese	October 22, 1994	106
Mama takes Huey to the photographer to make him a photo. The photographer is actually the fox which tries everything to eat him. This episode originally aired with "Surf and Sound" (Herman and Katnip), "Huey's Ducky Daddy" (a Noveltoon featuring Baby Huey) and a brief clip from "Frighty Cat" (Herman and Katnip).
7	7	"The Hippocratic Oaf"	Bob Jaques	Vincent Waller	Vincent Waller	October 29, 1994	107
Huey accidentally swallows a clock and his mom takes him to the doctor. The doctor tries to help him, but everything goes wrong. This episode originally aired with "Northwest Mousie" (Herman and Katnip), "Scout Fellow" (a Noveltoon featuring Baby Huey) and a brief clip from "Mouseum" (Herman and Katnip).
8	8	"Daycare Duckie"	Ron Zorman	Bob Jaques, Kelly Armstrong, Ron Zorman & Mauro Casalese	Lance Taylor	November 5, 1994	108
After "the third teacher this week" quits from "Little Ducker's Daycare", the fox comes in her place and tries to eat Huey. Finally, Huey catches the fox and becomes the hero for the other kids. This episode originally aired with "Of Mice and Magic" (Herman and Katnip), "Starting From Hatch" (a Noveltoon featuring Baby Huey) and a brief clip from "Cat in the Act" (Herman and Katnip).
9	9	"The Bully Fighter"	Kelly Armstrong	Bob Jaques, Kelly Armstrong, Ron Zorman & Mauro Casalese	Jamie Oliff	November 12, 1994	109
Huey tries to prevent a bully. This episode originally aired with "Sky Scrappers" (Herman and Katnip), "Jumping With Toy" (a Noveltoon featuring Baby Huey) and a brief clip of "Huey's Ducky Daddy" (a Noveltoon featuring Baby Huey).
10	10	"Wrestle Maniacs"	Mauro Casalese	Bob Jaques, Kelly Armstrong, Ron Zorman & Mauro Casalese	Jordan Reichek	November 19, 1994	110
When Baby Huey accidentally hits Mr. Grun, the champion of Wrestle Fight, Baby Huey decides to fight instead of him. This episode originally aired with "Frighty Cat" (Herman and Katnip), "Huey's Father's Day" (a Noveltoon featuring Baby Huey) and a brief clip from "Clown on the Farm" (a Noveltoon featuring Baby Huey).
11	11	"The Boogeyman"	Ron Zorman	Bob Jaques, Kelly Armstrong, Ron Zorman & Mauro Casalese	Jordan Reichek	November 26, 1994	111
A green boogeyman tries to kill Baby Huey. This episode originally aired with "Fun on Furlough" (Herman and Katnip), "Pest Pupil" (a Noveltoon featuring Baby Huey) and a brief clip from "Git Along Lil' Duckie" (a Noveltoon featuring Baby Huey).
12	12	"The Tooth Fairy"	Kelly Armstrong	Bob Jaques, Kelly Armstrong, Ron Zorman & Mauro Casalese	Vincent Waller	December 3, 1994	112
When Huey lost his tooth, Papa tells him the story of The Tooth Fairy, but Huey doesn't believe, so Papa disguises himself as the Tooth Fairy. This episode originally aired with "Robin Rodenthood" (Herman and Katnip) and "Party Smarty" (a Noveltoon featuring Baby Huey).
13	13	"Having a Ball"	Bob Jaques	Bob Jaques, Kelly Armstrong, Ron Zorman & Mauro Casalese	Jamie Oliff	December 10, 1994	113
Papa teaches Huey how to play baseball. This episode originally aired with "Dizzy Dishes" (a Noveltoon featuring Little Audrey), "Quack-A-Doodle-Doo" (a Noveltoon featuring Baby Huey) and a brief clip from "Swab the Duck" (a Noveltoon featuring Baby Huey).

=== Season 2 (1995) ===
No. overall	No. in season	Title	Directed by	Written by	Storyboard by	Original release date	Prod. code
14	1	"Target...Huey!"	Jordan Reichek	Tom Klein & Jordan Reichek	Jordan Reichek	September 16, 1995	201
Huey wants to play war, but the ducklings don't let him. He goes to the US Army Test Grounds and messes up with a general (with his hat covering all his head). This episode originally aired with the "Richie Rich Gems" vignette, "Of Mice and Magic" (Herman and Katnip) and "Fowl Photography" (show #6).
15	2	"Duck Huey Duck"	Steve Loter	Henry Gilroy	Stark Howell	September 23, 1995	202
Every time Huey gets hit on the head, he becomes a possessed-like master. When he gets hit once again, he reverts to himself. Seeing this, the duckling and the fox hit him several times. This episode originally aired with the "Richie Rich Gems" vignette, "Cat Carson Rides Again" (a Noveltoon featuring Herman and Katnip) and "Duck Outdoors" (show #4).
16	3	"Huey's First Haircut"	Patrick A. Ventura	Patrick A. Ventura	Joe Horne	September 30, 1995	203
Mama takes Huey to the barbershop, but the barber is actually the fox. The fox tries everything to eat Huey. This episode originally aired with the "Richie Rich Gems" vignette, "Mouseum" (Herman and Katnip) and "The Tooth Fairy" (show #12).
17	4	"Tempo Tantrum"	Vicky Jenson	Keith Baxter	Jeff Siergey & Keith Baxter	October 7, 1995	204
Huey learns how to play keyboards, but he practices day after day, much to Papa's disagreement and Papa tries to prevent Huey from playing them. This episode originally aired with the "Richie Rich Gems" vignette, "Party Smarty" (a Noveltoon featuring Baby Huey) and "Frighty Cat" (Herman and Katnip).
18	5	"To Sewer with Love"	Vicky Jenson	Patrick A. Ventura & Tom Klein	Vicky Jenson	October 14, 1995	205
This episode originally aired with the "Richie Rich Gems" vignette, "Fun On Furlough" (Herman and Katnip) and "Beach Blanket Baby" (show #3).
19	6	"Superhero Huey"	Steve Loter	Steve Loter, Henry Gilroy, Vicky Jenson & Tom Klein	Joe Horne	October 21, 1995	206
This episode originally aired with the "Richie Rich Gems" vignette, "Robin Rodenthood" (Herman and Katnip) and "The Boogeyman" (show #11).
20	7	"Self Help Huey"	Joe Horne	Joe Horne & Tom Klein	Joe Horne	October 28, 1995	207
This episode originally aired with the "Richie Rich Gems" vignette, "Ship A-Hooey" (Herman and Katnip) and "A Dog Day's Night" (show #2).
21	8	"Downhill Ducks"	Vicky Jenson & Don Judge	Gene Ray & Tom Klein	Hudson Hornet	November 4, 1995	208
This episode originally aired with the "Richie Rich Gems" vignette, "Sky Scrappers" (Herman and Katnip) and "The Bully Fighter" (show #9).
22	9	"Eggs"	Jordan Reichek	Tom Klein & Jordan Reichek	Jordan Reichek	November 11, 1995	209
This episode originally aired with the "Richie Rich Gems" vignette, "Surf and Sound" (Herman and Katnip) and "Quack-A-Doodle-Doo" (a Noveltoon featuring Baby Huey).
23	10	"Three Ducks and a Dope"	Steve Loter	Steve Loter & Tom Klein	Bob McKnight	November 18, 1995	210
This episode originally aired with the "Richie Rich Gems" vignette, "Mouse Trapeze" (Herman and Katnip) and "The Hippocratic Oaf" (show #7).
24	11	"Southbound"	Joe Horne	Vicky Jenson & Tom Klein	Hudson Hornet	November 25, 1995	211
This episode originally aired with the "Richie Rich Gems" vignette, "Cock-a-Doodle Dino" (a Noveltoon featuring Danny Dinosaur) and "Swab the Duck" (a Noveltoon featuring Baby Huey).
25	12	"Operation Immunization"	Vicky Jenson	Vicky Jenson & Tom Klein	Vicky Jenson & Stephen DeStefano	December 2, 1995	212
This episode originally aired with the "Richie Rich Gems" vignette, "Herman the Catoonist" (Herman and Katnip) and "Huey's Father's Day" (a Noveltoon featuring Baby Huey).
26	13	"The Tunnel of Terror"	Jordan Reichek	Tom Klein & Jordan Reichek	Joe Horne & Jordan Reichek	December 9, 1995	213
This episode originally aired with the "Richie Rich Gems" vignette, "Crazytown" (Noveltoon) and "Pest Pupil" (a Noveltoon featuring Baby Huey)
