= Sad Sad Sack World =

Comic book series

Sad Sad Sack World (also known as Sad Sad Sack) is an American comic book series, published by Harvey Comics. The series ran from October 1964 to December 1973; in all, 46 issues were released.

The series featured characters from the Sad Sack comic series, created by George Baker.

The series was a "giant-size" Harvey comic for most of its run. Issues #1 (October 1964) to 31 (June 1971) were 68 pages; issues #32 (September 1971) to 39 (October 1972) were 52 pages. The title was a standard-size comic (32-36 pages) for the remainder of its run.

Sad Sad Sack World was a quarterly publication for most of its run. The series became a bi-monthly by mid-1972.

Sad Sad Sack World was canceled in late 1973 by Harvey, during a purge of their non-Richie Rich titles. Other Sad Sack titles (Sad Sack Navy, Sad Sack with Sarge and Sadie and Sad Sack U.S.A.) were also canceled that year.
