= The Sad Sack =

1957 film by George Marshall

- Original film poster
- Directed by: George Marshall
- Written by: George Baker; Edmund Beloin; Nate Monaster
- Produced by: Hal B. Wallis
- Starring: Jerry Lewis; David Wayne; Phyllis Kirk; Peter Lorre
- Cinematography: Loyal Griggs
- Edited by: Archie Marshek
- Music by: Walter Scharf
- Distributed by: Paramount Pictures
- Release date: November 27, 1957
- Running time: 95 minutes
- Country: United States
- Language: English
- Budget: $1.1 million
- Box office: $3.5 million (US rentals); 1,878,519 admissions (France)

The Sad Sack is a 1957 American comedy film based on the Harvey Comics character of the same title, created by George Baker. The film stars Jerry Lewis and Peter Lorre and was released by Paramount Pictures.

== Plot ==
Private Meredith Bixby simply cannot fall in line with army procedure, even though he has had 17 months of training. A psychologist is assigned to turn him into a good soldier, so she enlists two fellow servicemen to help Bixby with his training. About the only thing that he can do right is remember things with his photographic memory.

Eventually they are assigned to a base in Morocco. One night they all head off to a bar where Bixby gets drunk on "Moroccan Delights", which he thinks are malteds. He gets involved with a femme fatale and is kidnapped by some Arabian renegades.

Abdul guards Bixby and makes him assemble a stolen cannon, knowing that Bixby had already memorized the assembly instructions back at the base. Bixby is eventually rescued by his fellow soldiers and they are all presented with medals of honor. However, when Bixby mishandles a rifle that suddenly goes off, he damages the drinking glasses of the General and two visiting French officers. The trio (who are drinking a toast) are not hurt, but misfit Bixby gets punished with KP duty, peeling potatoes.

== Cast ==
- Jerry Lewis as Pvt. Bixby
- Phyllis Kirk as Maj. Shelton
- Peter Lorre as Abdul
- Liliane Montevecchi as Zita
- David Wayne as Corp. Dolan
- Joe Mantell as Pvt. Wenaslavsky
- Gene Evans as Sgt. Pulley
- Shepperd Strudwick as Maj. Vanderlip
- Mary Treen as Sgt. Hansen

== Production ==
The film is based upon George Baker's comic book character. Hal B. Wallis purchased the film rights with the intention that the project would star the comedy team Martin and Lewis, but they split up before filming began. The Sad Sack was shot between March 18 and May 31, 1957, and released on November 27. It was re-released in 1962 as a double feature with another Jerry Lewis vehicle, The Delicate Delinquent, the first two films Lewis made without Dean Martin.

== Reception ==
A Variety reviewer said that "the title, a hint of what the picture is about, and Jerry Lewis as star, communicate the message about this new Hal B. Wallis production. It's the old army game, done over. But it's fun. Not any imaginative explorations. Relying on the type of zanyism with which Lewis is readily identified. Fun for those who go for it". Harold Whitehead of The Montreal Gazette said that "fans of his particular brand of comedy will undoubtedly have a fine time watching this film".

On the other hand, Bosley Crowther of The New York Times had this to say:

Those who remember Sad Sack, the cartooned G. I. of World War II whose troubles, as sketched by George Baker in Yank, were solace for many a soldier boy, will look in vain for that sweet character in the film that goes by his name and that came yesterday to Loew's State. Old Sad Sack is nowhere to be seen.

Rather, the fellow here encountered is a blithe, bumbling, modern-day draftee who looks for all the world like Jerry Lewis in At War With the Army—and virtually is. That is to say, he's Mr. Lewis in a standard rumpled Army uniform, blinking his eyes, creasing his mouth, scratching his noggin and generally behaving like a fool. The major difference is that Dean Martin is not in this picture as a foil, and the story ends up in Morocco. No improvement whatsoever is noticeable.

The only bit that reminded us remotely of Sad Sack is a fairly funny scene in which Mr. Lewis is put on "the couch" in the office of a Women's Army Corps psychiatrist. His mistaken suppositions of what's intended is somewhat like the famed anxieties of the old boy.

For the rest, this loose-jointed service slapstick is a bundle of well-worn gags played around the forever fumbling G. I. who becomes the big hero in the clutch. There are forays in a WAC dormitory, encounters with the sergeant and a snarl with villainous gun-runners in Morocco. Mr. Lewis' partners are David Wayne and Joe Mantell. Female factors are Liliane Montevecchi as a big-eyed Moroccan dancing girl and Phyllis Kirk as the WAC "head-shrinker".

All in all, it's a pretty feeble farce.

== See also ==
- List of American films of 1957
