= Sad Sack Laugh Special =

American comic book series

Sad Sack Laugh Special is an American comic book series, published by Harvey Comics.

The title was issued by Harvey from Winter 1958/59 to February 1977; 93 issues were published.

Sad Sack Laugh Special started as an 84-page comic book, published quarterly (later bi-monthly), featuring Harvey Comics' character Sad Sack. Supporting characters (Sarge, General Rockjaw, Slob Slobinski, Hi-Fi Tweeter) were also featured. Many issues featured the art of longtime Sad Sack illustrators Fred Rhoads and Jack O'Brien. O'Brien's stories often featured an Army camp professor who used Sad Sack in his experiments. One such issue was Sad Sack Laugh Special #74 (November 1973); examples of this issue and O'Brien's art can be viewed at the "Comic Treadmill" website.

The title was an 84-page comic through issue #9 (July 1961). From #10 (October 1961) to #60 (July 1971), 68 pages; from #61 (September 1971) to #76 (March 1974), 52 pages; from #77 (May 1974) to #93 (February 1977), it was a standard 36-page comic.

Sad Sack Laugh Special was canceled in late 1976 during a general purge of Harvey Comics titles; the last issue (#93), was released on October 28.
