= Martin Taras =

American cartoonist

Martin Bernard Taras (9 August 1914 – 2 November 1994), also known as Morrie Tarasinsky, was an American cartoonist who mostly worked at Famous Studios, the New York–based animation division of Paramount Pictures.

== Career ==
Taras started his animation career at Van Beuren Studios in 1934 until its closing in 1936. He was involved in the 1937 Fleischer Studios strike, but abandoned it shortly after to take a job for Jam Handy. Following a stint at Terrytoons in the early 1940s, Taras became an animator at Fleischer Studios' successor Famous Studios, where he is known for the creation of Baby Huey. Huey debuted in the first Casper comic issue in September 1949, six months before his animated debut in the short "Quack-A-Doodle-Doo". Taras animated for theatrical shorts and drew comic books featuring characters such as Casper the Friendly Ghost, Spooky the Tuff Little Ghost, Rags Rabbit, Wendy the Good Little Witch, Herman and Katnip, and Buzzy the Funny Crow. Taras departed Famous in 1956 to return to Terrytoons, then under the supervision of Gene Deitch.

Taras also served as animator and/or designer for television programs such as Batfink, Spider-Man (the 1967 series), Josie and the Pussycats, Super Friends; and for theatrical motion pictures such as Fritz The Cat, Lord of the Rings, and Wizards.
