= Baby Huey =

Fictional character

- Noveltoons character
- First appearance: Quack-a-Doodle-Doo; March 3, 1950
- Created by: Martin Taras
- Portrayed by: Rodger Bumpass (1999; Baby Huey's Great Easter Adventure)
- Voiced by: Sid Raymond (1950–1959, 1994–1995); Joe Alaskey (1995–1996); Stephen Furst (1999; Baby Huey's Great Easter Adventure)

In-universe information
- Species: Duck
- Gender: Male

Baby Huey is a fictional character created by Martin Taras for Paramount Pictures' Famous Studios. He is a gigantic and naïve duckling. Huey first appeared in Quack-a-Doodle-Doo in 1950, becoming a frequent recurring character in Famous Studios' Noveltoons cartoon series, and eventually a regular fixture in Harvey Comics publications.

== Famous Studios ==
The full version of Quack-a-Doodle-Doo, featuring the first appearance of Baby Huey.

Huey first appeared onscreen in the Noveltoons short Quack-a-Doodle-Doo, released in theaters on March 3, 1950. The character's voice was provided by Sid Raymond, an actor and comedian who created several other voices for Famous Studios' characters, including Katnip from Herman and Katnip. Eleven Baby Huey cartoons were produced between 1951 and 1959.

Many animated shorts featuring Huey had recurring themes. Most common among them was him trying to be just like any other kid his age. He would see his peers playing, and would immediately get excited. However, whenever he tried to involve himself in the activities of his peers (also anthropomorphic ducklings), his large size and strength would often inadvertently cause problems at their expense, and as a result they would drive him away through trickery (and into tears). A hungry fox (voiced by Jackson Beck) would show up, originally intending to eat Huey's peers, but upon seeing Huey as a bigger meal and overhearing the distraught duck's desires to play with someone, would feign friendship and set traps along the way, all of which would prove ineffective on Huey and/or backfire on the fox. At first, Huey was blissfully unaware of the fox's true agenda, but as his peers watched the annoyed fox in action from a safe distance (and fearing for his safety just as they did their own), Huey would come to realize the truth about his predator and dispose of him, usually by saying: "Hey, you! You're the fox! And I think you're trying to kill me!", and would kill the fox. Other times, however, Huey would remain blissfully unaware and the exasperated fox would finally give up, fleeing Baby Huey before any more misfortune befell him. In the end, Huey's peers would make amends for their previous attitudes towards him and happily include him in their activities.

Baby Huey had a sidekick in later comics. This was his slow-thinking cousin, whom he referred to as Cousin Dimwit. Dimwit was characterized as a fairly skinny duck in an oversized red woolen sweater, with sleeves that ran over his hands and hung down several inches.

== Harvey Comics and later animated appearances ==
Baby Huey made a comic book debut in Little Audrey #25, 1952, by Harvey Comics. Harvey Comics Hits #60 was the second Harvey-published comic book to feature the character.

The 1956 comic Baby Huey, the Baby Giant was the first to bear the character's name; it ran for 99 issues until 1972. The spin-off Baby Huey and Papa lasted for 33 issues (1962–1968), and Baby Huey in Duckland for 15 issues (1962–1966).

Huey's parents, Papa and Mama Duck (Gilbert & Silly), always struggled to manage their overgrown son despite his overbearing weight and strength, which often resulted in damage to his family's house or car, injury to Papa, or a threat from Papa's boss to fire him if Huey harmed the boss or caused damage to his home or office. Papa often disparaged Huey (who remained oblivious to his disapproval). Huey's main sidekicks were small identical triplet ducks (who bore a striking resemblance to Donald Duck's nephews, Huey, Dewey, and Louie) who resented or mocked Huey for his stupidity and clumsiness but depended on his superhero strength to get them out of trouble.

Characters who appeared in Baby Huey comic books in separate strips included Herman and Katnip and Buzzy the Funny Crow, who was always outsmarting a blue cat (who resembled Katnip) that tried to catch and eat him.

Harvey purchased the rights to all of Famous's original characters in 1959, and Huey continued to appear regularly in Harvey publications until 1972. Huey was rarely seen for nearly two decades afterward, returning to comics in 1990.

Originally, Baby Huey was intended to appear as a cameo in the film Who Framed Roger Rabbit, in the deleted scene "Acme's Funeral". In that deleted scene, he appears with other animated characters scared when Casper appears at the funeral.

Carbunkle Cartoons produced a new series of Baby Huey cartoons for television in 1994, which aired as The Baby Huey Show for two seasons. Sid Raymond reprised his role but was later replaced with Joe Alaskey, once the production was taken over by Universal Cartoon Studios.

He also starred in a live-action direct-to-video film, Baby Huey's Great Easter Adventure, in 1999, voiced by Stephen Furst (who also directed the film) and portrayed physically by Rodger Bumpass (who had a cameo in this film).

U.S. President Bill Clinton in a 1993 conversation cited his similarities to Baby Huey: "I'm a lot like Baby Huey. I'm fat. I'm ugly. But if you push me down, I keep coming back".

In The Spooktacular New Adventures of Casper segment entitled "Legend of Duh Bigfoot", Baby Huey makes a cameo at the end of that segment. In Harvey Girls Forever, Baby Huey makes cameo appearances in the third and fourth seasons as a Horn-a-Corn costume He also makes a brief cameo in the final episode Harvey Endings as mutant duck baby in a sewer.

The documentary Hype! references Baby Huey, by comparing it to different music revolutions that hit different cities at random times.

The 2004 music documentary Dig! also references Baby Huey. "Baby Huey" is mentioned as a derogatory nickname used during a conflict over a music video shoot involving Courtney Taylor-Taylor, frontman of The Dandy Warhols.

== Filmography ==
=== Theatrical shorts ===
- Quack-a-Doodle Doo (March 3, 1950)
- One Quack Mind (Jan 12, 1951)
- Party Smarty (Aug 3, 1951)
- Scout Fellow (Dec 21, 1951)
- Clown on the Farm (Aug 22, 1952)
- Starting from Hatch (Mar 6, 1953)
- Huey's Ducky Daddy (Nov 20, 1953)
- Git Along Li'l Duckie (Mar 25, 1955)
- Swab the Duck (May 11, 1956)
- Pest Pupil (Jan 25, 1957)
- Ghost of Honor (July 19, 1957; guest)
- Jumping with Toy (Oct 4, 1957)
- Huey's Father's Day (May 8, 1959)

=== Television ===
- Matty's Funday Funnies (1959, theatrical shorts shown along with other post-1950 Paramount cartoons)
- Casper and Friends (1990–1994, theatrical shorts with original or re-dubbed soundtrack)
- The Baby Huey Show (1994–1995)
- The Spooktacular New Adventures of Casper (1996, cameo in "Legend of Duh Bigfoot")
- The Harveytoons Show (1998–1999, theatrical shorts)
- Harvey Girls Forever (2018, cameo in "Jet Fretters", "Now It's Con", "Bobby of Influence", "Misadventureland", "Scare Bud", "All Harveys Eve" and "Harvey Endings")

=== Films ===
- Baby Huey's Great Easter Adventure (1999, direct-to-video film)
