= George Baker (cartoonist) =

American cartoonist

- 1944 ink portrait of George Baker by Gregor Duncan.
- Born: May 22, 1915 Lowell, Massachusetts
- Died: May 7, 1975 (aged 59) Riverside, California
- Areas: Cartoonist, Writer
- Notable works: Sad Sack

George Baker (May 22, 1915 – May 7, 1975) was a cartoonist who became prominent during World War II as the creator of the popular comic strip The Sad Sack.

The 1957 comedy film The Sad Sack starring Jerry Lewis was based on Baker's fictional character.

== Biography ==
=== Early life and education ===
Baker was born in Lowell, Massachusetts, living there until 1923. He grew up in Rock Island, Illinois, and Chicago. In Chicago, he attended Lane Tech High School and graduated from Roosevelt High, where he played baseball and drew pictures for the high school annual.

=== Commercial artist ===
After six weeks of art training in a night school, he got a job as a commercial artist "but soon grew tired of drawing pots and pans for newspaper advertisements."

=== Disney days ===
He moved to California to pursue a baseball career. Instead, he was hired by Walt Disney in 1937, and assisted in the production of the studio's full-length animated features, including Pinocchio, Fantasia, Dumbo and Bambi. His specialty was animation of thunderstorms, waterfalls and other effects.

=== World War II ===
Five months prior to Pearl Harbor, Baker was drafted (June 1941) into the United States Army. He related later that he expected that the Army Classification System would have no use for his artistic experience, noting "They say it makes cooks out of mechanics, and vice versa. But I must say, it worked perfectly in my case." To his surprise, he was assigned to Fort Monmouth for basic training and to create animation for Signal Corps training films.

Baker won a cartoon contest, sponsored by the "Defense Recreation Committee", and received a portable typewriter as first prize. Life magazine printed some of his submissions, and he was hired by Yank, the Army Weekly, where he adapted his drawings of the misadventures of an army recruit into The Sad Sack. Drawn in pantomime, the strip became the magazine's most popular feature, as measured by the fan mail from servicemen who identified with the luckless private. In an official document, General George C. Marshall praised Sad Sack as a morale-booster for World War II troops.

=== Civilian life ===
At the end of the war, the U.S. Army created an advertising campaign with the phrase: "Don't be a Sad Sack, re-enlist in the Regular Army". Discharged from military service, Baker returned to live in Los Angeles where he transformed the Sad Sack army cartoon into a syndicated comic strip and a comic book series aimed at younger readers.

While Baker gave the job of writing the comic narrative to others, he continued to illustrate the Sad Sack comic book covers until the time of his death. The Sad Sack radio program was broadcast in 1946.

=== Sad Sack nursing scholarships ===
In 1945 the AMVETS National Sad Sacks were formed to raise money for the Sad Sacks Nursing Scholarship Fund. The scholarships, named after Baker's cartoon character, are awarded to children of military veterans.

=== Death and burial ===
George Baker is buried at Riverside National Cemetery, Riverside, California.
