= Herman and Katnip =

Famous Studios theatrical cartoon characters

- First appearance: Herman: The Henpecked Rooster (February 18, 1944); Katnip: Mice Meeting You (November 24, 1950)
- Last appearance: Herman: Katnip’s Big Day (October 30, 1959); Katnip: 3 Ducks and a Dope (November 18, 1995; The Baby Huey Show)
- Created by: Dave Tendlar
- Voiced by: Herman: Arnold Stang (1944–1959); Jackson Beck (1950; Gobs of Fun); Allen Swift (1954–1955); Jack Mercer (1959; Katnip's Big Day); Katnip: Sid Raymond (1950–1959); Jack Mercer (1957–1959); Joe Alaskey (1995)

In-universe information
- Species: Mouse: Herman; Cat: Katnip
- Gender: Males

Herman the Mouse and Katnip the Cat are a duo of cartoon characters and the titular protagonists of Herman and Katnip, a series of theatrical cartoons produced by Famous Studios during the 1950s. It is a spin-off of the Noveltoons series, which featured shorts starring the two characters. Arnold Stang and Allen Swift were the regular voices of Herman, while Sid Raymond was the regular actor for Katnip, although the characters would occasionally be voiced by Jackson Beck (Herman) or Jack Mercer (Katnip).

== History ==
Herman, voiced by Arnold Stang, would debut in the 1944 Noveltoon short The Henpecked Rooster. From then until September 1950, Herman was a solo star of numerous shorts produced by Famous Studios. In some of his later Noveltoon shorts, Herman would be paired with an unnamed black cat, starting with the short Naughty but Mice (1947), which would establish the plot for subsequent Herman and Katnip cartoons.

Katnip, voiced by Sid Raymond, made his first appearance with Herman on November 1950 with "Mice Meeting You". Two years later, the duo would star in their own series starting with 1952's Mice-Capades. Most of the shorts would be supervised by animator Dave Tendlar, whose direction was notable for its focus on violent gags, more-so then any other director in the studio. The two characters continued to star in animated cartoons until 1959.

The series would generally follow a strict formula: Katnip would attack Herman's cousins while they were going about their day, usually chasing them into a mouse hole. Herman would then appear and, discovering his cousins in peril, he uses his quick thinking and nimble precision to outwit Katnip. All of Herman's battles with Katnip ended with Herman victorious. Only two cartoons, You Said a Mouseful and Katnip's Big Day, had Katnip sharing in Herman's victory.

Frequently, Herman and his mouse companions would sing a victory song as they observed Katnip being brutalized, such as being eaten by sharks in Mice Paradise, getting crushed by furniture and then having his body strung up with Christmas lights in Mice Meeting You, and getting electrocuted by a "shock tester" machine, then flattened by it in Of Mice and Menace. Some shorts would also depict Katnip getting killed outright, such as getting killed by a giant snow boulder in Hide and Peek, or getting shot in the face after attempting to use a shotgun to reach the mouse hole and his ghost being warned about "the fiery furnace" in Mice Capades.

In 1958, they and the other original Famous Studios characters were purchased by comic-book publisher Harvey Comics, which continued to promote the characters under the name Harveytoons. The 1944 to 1950 Herman cartoons (originally released as part of the Noveltoons series) were sold by Paramount in 1955 to U.M. & M. TV Corporation for television distribution.

== Supporting characters ==
=== Henry ===
Prior to his pairing with Katnip, Herman teamed up in several cartoons with the henpecked rooster Henry. Henry's nemesis is his domineering wife, Bertha (also known as Chicken-Pie), who makes him do all the work around the house. Bertha is deathly afraid of mice, however: always bawking in shock every time Herman scares her. With Herman's help, Henry tries to manipulate Bertha into treating him more fairly. Herman appeared with Henry in three shorts; The Henpecked Rooster (1944), Scrappily Married (1945) and Sudden Fried Chicken (1946).

Under the new name Hector, the rooster was featured in Dell Publishing's Animal Comics #7-17 (1944–1945), with Herman as ongoing co-star, and artist Walt Kelly (Pogo) drawing several of the later stories. In Sudden Fried Chicken, the cartoons also adopted the name Hector, though the "Featuring Herman and Henry" title card remained unchanged for unknown reasons.

=== Herman’s cousins and nephews ===
Herman the mouse had several identical cousins who appeared in various shorts. These cousins include Reuben, Dubin, and Louie, three grey mice with red shorts. In addition to these, other unnamed mice also appear as Herman's cousins and relatives in earlier shorts. In every plot of the shorts, the mice are shown as victims, trying relaxing in a place, steal food, etc, when their usual nemesis Katnip shows up with intent of making certain that no mouse in the area enjoys anything, only when Herman arrives with the intent of violence against the cat, to protect his cousins. They also frequently appeared in Harvey Comics’ Herman and Katnip comic books in the 1950s to the 1970s.

Herman also had three nephews introduced in Of Mice and Menace (1954). In the shorts he takes his nephews to places like a penny arcade, a circus or a museum unaware that Katnip is on patrol. They only appeared in 3 cartoons together. One of the nephews, Murgatroyd made his final appearance in the Cat in the Act (1957).

=== Spike ===
Spike is another nemesis of Katnip, a muscular grey cat voiced by Jackson Beck who first appeared in A Bicep Built for Two (1955). In the short Katnip's serenading of a girl cat is interrupted by Spike that runs him off and takes over. The love-lorn Katnip is determined to best Spike and enlists the aid of Herman. Spike would make another appearance in the final short Katnip’s Big Day (1959).

=== Buzzy the Crow ===
A singing black crow in a flat straw hat, who spoke in a stereotypical "black dialect", provided by Jackson Beck. Buzzy was introduced in the 1947 short The Stupidstitious Cat. Historian Don Markstein said that Buzzy was "a take-off on the gravely voice of character actor Eddie Anderson, who played Rochester on Jack Benny's show, with [Sid] Raymond (Baby Huey) as Katnip, sounding like Benny himself".

Katnip's battle with Buzzy was usually based on Katnip trying to kick an ailment. He would read a rhyming verse from a medical book that suggested crow meat as the sure cure. Once confronted by Katnip, however, Buzzy would propose another solution in an attempt to save his own skin, to which the cat usually replied, "Hmmmm, that sounds logical", but these solutions usually "failed" at the expense of Katnip, who would finally lose his patience and say, "This time, I'm doing what the book says!" This would result in a chase between the two characters—with Buzzy making occasional puns at Katnip's expense along the way—and end with Buzzy victorious and Katnip nowhere near the road to recovery.

Buzzy's mannerisms and voice were based on what are now considered offensive stereotypes of African-Americans of the time. There were censorship issues related to Buzzy as a black stereotype. On the television series Casper and Friends, Buzzy's voice is redubbed to remove any offending content. Buzzy also frequently appeared in Harvey Comics' Baby Huey comic books in the 1960s and 1970s, in a rivalry with a cat resembling Katnip but of a different color. Sometimes, this cat was named Katsy Cat.

=== Kitnip ===
Kitnip is Katnip’s nephew, a kitten voiced by Mae Questel. He made his first appearance in Felineous Assault (1959), where Katnip is trying to teach him the facts of feline life, especially the art of catching mice. Kitnip would appear in various Baby Huey comic books from the 1960s, illustrated by Marty Taras.

=== Finny ===
A small yellow goldfish whose vocal effects were provided by Jack Mercer. Finny was introduced in the 1952 Noveltoon, Feast and Furious, where Katnip is determined to make a meal out of him after being spied through the window. Katnip has various plans to catch the fish but fails. He then tries to roast him by focusing the sun's rays through a magnifying glass. Finny jumps into a bottle of cooking wine. Katnip tries to drink him out, and they both end up being intoxicated. Finny would make appearances and cameos in other shorts like the 1951 Noveltoon, As the Crow Lies and the 1953 Herman and Katnip short, Of Mice and Magic.

== Legacy ==
Animation historian Leonard Maltin describing the series as a prime stereotype of the "violent cat versus mouse" battles that were commonplace among Hollywood cartoons of the 1920s through the 1960s. Herman and Katnip is often considered a clone of MGM's Tom and Jerry. The violence in this series, while intended for comedic effect, was noted for reaching a level of brutality that surpassed both Tom and Jerry, and the Looney Tunes shorts. More contemporary historians have noted that Herman's excessive actions towards the more hapless Katnip made his character hard to sympathize with, especially compared to Tom and Jerry's more dynamic rivalry and personalities.

It had been originally intended that Herman and Katnip would make a cameo appearance in the film Who Framed Roger Rabbit in the scene called "Acme's Funeral", but the scene was cut out of the film. In that deleted scene, they appear with other animated characters scared when Casper appears at the funeral.

Katnip later appeared in the episode "Self Help Huey" of the animated series The Baby Huey Show voiced by Joe Alaskey, as a cat redeemed by his persecutions of the past and tries to teach the Fox to follow the same path with Baby Huey, and would reappear in the series as a cameo inside a bar in "3 Ducks and a Dope".

The Simpsons writer/producer Mike Reiss states that The Itchy & Scratchy Show is based on Herman and Katnip, which he calls a "cheap, ultra-violent knockoff" of Tom and Jerry. Director David Silverman supports this, stating Herman and Katnip "is hilarious because it's just bad".

== Availability ==
All "Herman and Katnip" and some Herman solo shorts have been released on public domain videocassettes and DVDs. Some prints have the U.M. & M. or NTA logo at the start and end, masking the old Paramount title, but the UCLA Film and Television Archive restored these shorts to their original Paramount titles.

In 2011, Classic Media issued Herman and Katnip: The Complete Series, a DVD collecting all of Herman and Katnip's appearances together. Also included were two Katnip solo shorts, Feast and Furious and City Kitty. The cartoons were presented in shortened TV prints from the anthology series The Harveytoons Show, with abbreviated opening titles, no end titles, and (in the case of Drinks on the Mouse) some censorship.

Prints of Mice Meeting You and Mice Paradise bear the "Featuring Herman" card as seen on Herman's solo shorts, even though these two shorts also feature Katnip.

== See also ==
- List of Herman and Katnip cartoons
- Tom and Jerry
- List of Tom And Jerry cartoons
- Itchy and Scratchy
- Squeak the Mouse
- Sylvester the Cat
- Little Roquefort
- Pixie and Dixie and Mr. Jinks
- Motormouse and Autocat
- Punkin' Puss and Mushmouse
- Krazy Kat
