= Buzzy the Crow =

Animated cartoon character

Buzzy Crow
- Noveltoons character
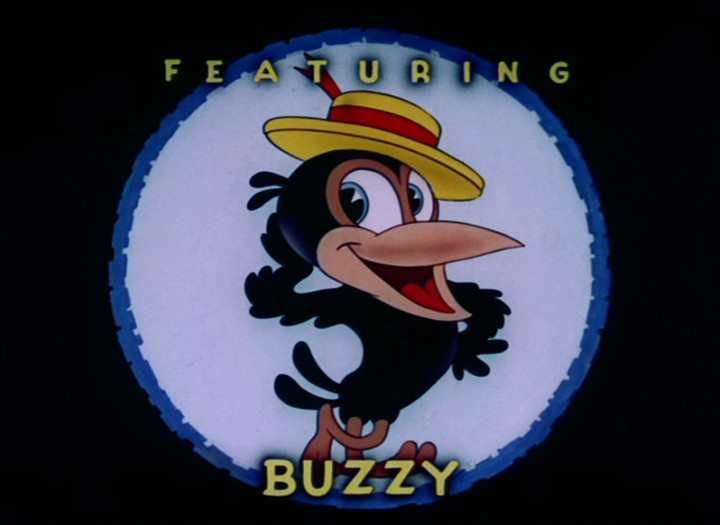
- First appearance: The Stupiditious Cat (1947)
- Voiced by: Jackson Beck (1947–1959); Jack Mercer (1949, vocal effects, The Big Drip; 1951, Sing Again of Michigan)

In-universe information
- Species: Crow
- Gender: Male

Buzzy the Funny Crow is an animated cartoon character created at Famous Studios for Paramount Pictures that first appeared in the Noveltoons cartoon, Stupidstitious Cat (1947). He went on to appear in 13 cartoons from 1947 to 1954, including Sock-a-Bye Kitty, As the Crow Lies, Cat-Choo, Better Bait Than Never and No Ifs, Ands or Butts.

"The Stupidstitious Cat" (Noveltoons; 1947) directed by Seymour Kneitel; featuring Buzzy the Crow (restored raw HD version)

Buzzy spoke in a gravelly voice which resembled that of Eddie Anderson, famous for playing the valet Rochester on Jack Benny's radio and later television program, and in The Stupidstitious Cat, Katnip's voice resembled that of Benny.

== Filmography ==
- The Stupidstitious Cat (Apr-25-1947) - Noveltoons
- Cat o' Nine Ails (Jan-9-1948) - Noveltoons (Soundtrack lost, but the original negative still exists)
- Winter Draws On (Mar-19-1948) - Screen Songs
- The Big Drip (Nov-25-1949) - Screen Songs (final Buzzy cartoon in the U.M. & M. package).
- Sock-a-Bye Kitty (Dec-2-1950) - Noveltoons with Katnip (first Buzzy cartoon in the Harvey Films package).
- As the Crow Lies (June-1-1951) - Noveltoons with Katnip.
- Sing Again of Michigan (Jun-29-1951) - Screen Songs
- Cat-Choo (Oct-12-1951) - Noveltoons with Katnip.
- The Awful Tooth (May-2-1952) - Noveltoons with Katnip.
- Better Bait Than Never (Jun-5-1953) - Noveltoons with Katnip.
- Hair Today Gone Tomorrow (Apr-16-1954) - Noveltoons with Katnip.
- No Ifs, ands, or Butts (Dec-17-1954) - Noveltoons
- Katnip's Big Day (Oct-30-1959) - Herman and Katnip (guest appearance and the final cartoon)
