= Sad Sack =

United States comic strip character

- Sad Sack #44 cover art by George Baker.

Publication information
- Publisher: Harvey Comics
- First appearance: Yank, the Army Weekly #1 (June 1942)
- Created by: George Baker

Sad Sack is an American comic strip and comic book character created by Sgt. George Baker during World War II. Set in the United States Army, Sad Sack depicted an otherwise unnamed, lowly private experiencing some of the absurdities and humiliations of military life.

The "unnamed private" was Ben Schnall, a true-life private in the U.S. Army during World War II, member of Yank magazine and good curmudgeonly friend of Sgt. George Baker. The title was a euphemistic shortening of the military slang "sad sack of shit", common during World War II. The phrase has come to mean "an inept person" or "inept soldier".

== Comic strip ==
Originally drawn in pantomime by Baker, The Sad Sack debuted June 1942 as a comic strip in the first issue of Yank, the Army Weekly. It proved popular, and a hardcover collection of Baker's wartime Sad Sack strips was published by Simon & Schuster, Inc., in 1944, with a 1946 follow-up, The New Sad Sack.

The original book was concurrently published as an Armed Services edition mass market paperback, in that edition's standard squarebound, horizontal, 5 5/8" × 4" format, by Editions for the Armed Services, Inc., a non-profit organization of The Council on Books in Wartime; it was #719 in the series of Armed Service editions.

After the war ended, The Sad Sack ran in newspaper syndication in the United States from May 5, 1946, until 1958. Baker then sold the rights to Harvey Comics, which produced a large number of commercial spin-offs.

== Comic book ==
Harvey Comics published original Sad Sack stories in the Sad Sack Comics comic book series, which ran 287 issues, cover-dated September 1949 to October 1982. Sack was a civilian until he re-enlisted in issue #22 (February 1953).

In 1951, Harvey published the one-shot Army giveaway comic Sad Sack Goes Home, meant to encourage soldiers to stay in the armed forces. Its story showed Sad Sack leaving the Army for civilian life, only to find it too difficult: Stores charge too much for goods, and a janitorial job treats Sad Sack badly. When Senator Homer E. Capehart complained that Sad Sack Goes Home amounted to "socialism", by demonizing the business world, Army units were forced to destroy much of the press run.

Spin-off series were:

- Sad Sack's Funny Friends #1–75 (Dec. 1955 – Oct. 1969)
- Sad Sack and the Sarge #1–155 (Sept. 1957 – June 1982)
- Sad Sack Laugh Special #1–93 (Winter 1958/59 – Feb. 1977)
- Sad Sack's Army Life Parade #1–57 (Oct. 1963 – circa 1975)
- Little Sad Sack #1–19 (Oct. 1964 – Nov. 1967), featuring a child version of the character
- Sad Sad Sack (Oct. 1964 – Dec. 1973) commonly known as Sad Sad Sack World
- Sad Sack Navy, Gobs 'n' Gals #1–8 (Aug. 1972 – Oct. 1973)
- Sad Sack USA #1–7 (Nov. 1972 – Nov. 1973)
- Sad Sack USA Vacation one-shot (Oct. 1974)
- Sad Sack Fun Around the World one-shot (1974)
- Sad Sack's Army Life Today #1–4 (circa mid-1975 to Nov. 1975, and May 1976)

Supporting characters included the Sarge (Sack's First Sergeant, the potbellied and tough but reasonable Sergeant Circle); Slob Slobinski and Hi-Fi Tweeter (Sack's bunk buddies); the General (Brigadier General Rockjaw, always drawn with dark glasses, cigarette holder and Ascot tie); Captain Softseat; Muttsy the dog (whose dog tag # was K-9); Sadie Sack (Sad's redheaded female cousin in the WACs); Ol' Sod Sack (Sad's hillbilly uncle); and Little Sad Sack (Sad as a kid, before his army induction). The spin-off Sad Sack Navy, Gobs 'n' Gals had the supporting character Gabby Gob.

The army camp where most of the action took place was usually named Camp Calamity, but was sometimes called Camp Browbeat.

The Harvey Comics and newspaper strip were aimed at younger readers than Baker's wartime originals, and the style of the strip changed dramatically. In the newspaper strip, the pantomime style was abandoned in favor of a more conventional comic-story format.

In the mid-1950s, Harvey Comics and Baker brought in Paul McCarthy to draw the Sad Sack titles, followed by Fred Rhoads, Jack O'Brien, and Joe Dennett. Others who periodically drew for the titles include Warren Kremer and Ken Selig. Baker retained editorial control and continued to illustrate the covers of Sad Sack comics until his death in 1975.

La Prensa, a Mexican publisher, released the Spanish language editions of the Sad Sack comics under the title Tristán Tristón. In addition to Sad Sack strips, other strips within each Tristán Tristón issue included Tristána Tristóna (Sad Sack's cousin, Sadie Sack) and Capulín which was about a boy who had overly large feet. The latter two strips were often only one page and used as filler. Other filler strips included Firulais and Chiquilladas.

== Litigation ==
George Baker's Sad Sack ("Change of Climate") for Yank

In late 2000, Alan Harvey, the eldest son of Harvey Comics founder Alfred Harvey, sued Steve Geppi, the owner of Diamond Comics Distribution and many other properties, charging that Geppi had plundered Harvey's warehouses in the mid-1980s, specifically of original art from Harvey's Sad Sack comic books.

Geppi countersued, claiming that he had legal title to the original art thanks to a 1984 agreement he had made with Steve Harvey—at the time President of Harvey Publications, Inc., as well as President of Sad Sack, Inc., a wholly owned subsidiary of Harvey Publications, Inc. The suit was settled in late 2002. At the time of the settlement, the New York Supreme Court had dismissed Harvey's claims against Geppi. The settlement agreement allowed Geppi to keep the art, with no money changing hands.

The rights to Sad Sack are still owned by Alan Harvey, and have since been published under the name of Lorne-Harvey Publications and Re-Collections.

== Radio ==
Private Sad Sack (played by Mel Blanc) made an appearance with Bob Hope and Betty Grable on the April 29, 1944, episode of G.I. Journal. The voice Blanc used was a stuttering delivery similar to Porky Pig. The character as voiced by Blanc appeared in multiple other broadcasts of G.I. Journal. The character was later referenced in the 1945 Mr. Hook short Tokyo Woes, portrayed as a fake American prisoner of war by a Japanese radio host.

Sponsored by Old Gold Cigarettes, The Sad Sack radio program ran in 1946 as a summer replacement series for The Frank Sinatra Show. It starred Herb Vigran in the title role with Jim Backus, Sandra Gould, Ken Christy and Patsy Moran. Dick Joy was the announcer for the series which began June 12, 1946, with the episode "Sack Returns Home from the Army" and continued until September 4 of that year.

== Films ==
- An animated film produced by UPA for U.S. Veterans' Administration, in 1948. Why it is important to retain GI insurance.
- Harvey Comics announced a forthcoming Live-action feature film in their Sad Sack issue #32 (March 1954). At Paramount Pictures, Baker's strip was adapted by screenwriters Edmund Beloin and Nate Monaster for George Marshall's film The Sad Sack (1957), in which WAC Major Shelton (Phyllis Kirk) has the assignment to turn bumbling Private Meredith C. Bixby (Jerry Lewis) into a good soldier. The supporting cast includes David Wayne, Peter Lorre and Joe Mantell.

== Sad Sack nursing scholarships ==
In 1945 the AMVETS National Sad Sacks were formed to raise money for the Sad Sacks Nursing Scholarship Fund. The scholarships, named after George Baker's Sad Sack cartoon character, are awarded to children of military veterans.

== See also ==
- AMVETS Sackettes, entertainment group of the Ladies Auxiliary
- AMVETS Sad Sacks, entertainment group
- Beetle Bailey
- Private Snafu
