= Jon D'Agostino =

Italian-American comic book artist (1929–2010)

- Born: John P. D'Agostino; June 13, 1929 Cervinara, Italy
- Died: November 28, 2010 (aged 81) Ansonia, Connecticut, U.S.
- Areas: Penciller, Inker, Letterer, Colourist

John P. D'Agostino Sr., generally credited as Jon D'Agostino (June 13, 1929 – November 28, 2010) was an Italian-American comic-book artist best known for his Archie Comics work. As well, under the pseudonym Johnny Dee, he was the letterer for the lead story in the Marvel Comics landmark The Amazing Spider-Man No. 1 (March 1963), as well as other seminal Marvel comics.

D'Agostino is not the French comics artist Tony D'Agostino, a.k.a. Tony Dagos, whose early work was signed "D'Agostino". He is also not the concurrent early-Marvel letterer John Duffy a.k.a. John Duffi.

== Biography ==
=== Early career ===
Jon D'Agostino was born in Cervinara, Italy, the son of Pasquale and Annunziata Pitanello D'Agostino. He emigrated to the United States with his family during childhood, and later attended New York City's School of Industrial Art and the Art Students League. (Sources vary.) His siblings were brothers Peter, Ted, Charles and William, the latter two of whom predeceased him, and sisters Lucielle and Gina.

D'Agostino's earliest known work in the comics medium was as head colorist for Timely Comics, the 1940s forerunner of Marvel Comics. In that capacity, in 1949, he mentored new-hire Stan Goldberg, a 16-year-old colorist who would later become one of Archie Comics' most prominent cartoonists. Goldberg in 2005 recalled, "I found out there was an opening in the coloring department at Timely Comics, so I went up there. They needed another body to be in the room that handled the coloring, and that's where I worked. ...[T]he man who was in charge of the coloring department is still a dear friend of mine, Jon D'Agostino."

Writer and artist credits were not routinely given during this period fans and historians refer to as the Golden Age of Comic Books, making full bibliographies difficult for many of the medium's pioneering creators. D'Agostino's first confirmed comics credit is penciling and inking the seven-page romance comic story "Glamor Killed My Love" (as John D'Agostino) in Romantic Hearts No. 6 (Feb. 1952), from publisher Story Comics. Other early credits, all using the first name "Jon", include horror stories in Master Publications' Dark Mysteries No. 14 (Oct. 1953), and inking the cover and the lead Rocky Jones, Space Ranger story in the science-fiction anthology series Space Adventures No. 18 (Sept. 1955), the first of his countless works for Charlton Comics.

=== Later career ===
Through the 1950s and into the 1960s, D'Agostino fully drew or simply inked across a variety of titles for Charlton, including romance comics (Sweethearts); war comics (Attack, Fightin' Army); talking animal comics and other types of children's comics (Pudgy Pig, Timmy the Timid Ghost, Hunk); and teen humor comics (Freddy, and the TV-series licensed comic My Little Margie). He occasionally inked penciler Matt Baker under the joint pseudonym Matt Bakerino.

As Johnny Dee, he lettered the lead story in the Marvel Comics' landmark The Amazing Spider-Man No. 1 (March 1963).

In the mid-1960s and continuing through the 1970s, D'Agostino began contributing to Archie Comics and Gold Key Comics in addition to Charlton, both as an artist and as a letterer. In the 1980s he was inking primarily for Archie and for Marvel, including on the latter's G.I. Joe, A Real American Hero, Marvel Two-In-One, and, for Marvel's Star Comics children's imprint, Planet Terry, Heathcliff, and Royal Roy.

By 1990, D'Agostino was exclusively inking for Archie, on teen-humor stories for such titles as Archie's Pals 'N' Gals, Jughead's Time Police, Hot Dog, Explorers of the Unknown (a light adventure comic starring the Archie gang), Sabrina the Teenage Witch, and the video game licensed comic Sonic the Hedgehog.

D'Agostino's last known published credit was inking the cover of Betty No. 173 (June 2008), although Archie Comics said in a statement announcing his death that his last interior work would appear in Jughead Double Digest No. 166, as part of the four-part "Cyrano Jones" story, "and several of his covers will be seen through 2011."

== Personal life ==
He married his first wife, Jean D'Onofrio D'Agostino, in 1955. They remained married until her death in 1992, and had three sons: John Jr., Peter, and Pat. Following the 1992 death of his first wife, he married Elvira "Vivi" Testa D'Agostino in 1995. The two lived in The Bronx, New York City.

D'Agostino died November 28, 2010, of bone cancer in Ansonia, Connecticut.
