= Ernie Colón =

Puerto Rican comics artist (1931–2019)

- Born: Ernesto Colón Sierra; July 13, 1931 San Juan, Puerto Rico
- Died: August 8, 2019 (aged 88) Huntington, New York, U.S.
- Areas: Penciller, Artist, Inker, Editor, Letterer
- Notable works: Arak, Son of Thunder; Amethyst, Princess of Gemworld; Casper the Friendly Ghost; Richie Rich; The 9/11 Report: A Graphic Adaptation
- Spouse: Ruth Ashby

Ernesto Colón Sierra (July 13, 1931 – August 8, 2019) was a stateside Puerto Rican comics artist, known for his wide-ranging career illustrating children's, superhero, and horror comics, as well as mainstream nonfiction.

== Early life ==
Colón was born July 13, 1931, in San Juan, Puerto Rico, the son of Ernesto Colón, a police detective, and Isabel Sierra, a textile worker and bank teller. He had eight siblings, all sisters. Raised in the mainland US from age 10, he listed among his early influences the newspaper adventure-strip writer-artists Milton Caniff and Will Eisner, and the lighthearted 1940s Fawcett Comics superhero Captain Marvel, saying, ”I never enjoyed superheroes – with the exception of the early Captain Marvel. That character had humor and didn't take itself as seriously as all the other snarling, furious products of DC and Marvel,” Colón said in 2011. He attended high school at what was then New York City's School of Industrial Art.

== Career ==
=== 1950s to 1970s ===
In 1955, cartoonist Ham Fisher hired Colón to ink backgrounds on the long-running comic strip Joe Palooka, an assignment that ended after approximately one month following Fisher's suicide that December. Colón began his career in earnest at Harvey Comics, recalling in 2011,

I read in [The New York] Times Harvey was looking for a letterer. I am acknowledged to be the worst letterer in the business. They sat me down next to Joe Rosen, acknowledged to be the best. Leon Harvey[, a company principal, with brothers Al and Robert,] took one look over my shoulder and said, simply, 'You're no letterer' and walked away. I went for the door, but Vicky Harvey, Al's wife, who knew my work, stopped me. She told me to wait while she spoke to Al. She apparently advised him not to let me go, because Leon came back and offered me a job doing paste-ups in the art department. I did that for a year while practicing drawing their characters at night. They then hired me as a freelancer and I worked for them for 25 years drawing most of their characters, but mainly Casper the Friendly Ghost and Richie Rich.

Working uncredited at Harvey Comics for much of that time, Colón met editor Sid Jacobson, who became his frequent creative partner. Colón' earliest attributed work appears in two comics each cover-dated December 1960: the 15-page story "Spellbound" in Harvey's The Friendly Ghost, Casper #28, and, in a one-off for Archie Comics, the two-page featurette "Madhouse Stamps for Teens" in Archie's Madhouse #9. In addition to much work for Harvey in the 1960s and 1970s, Colón also drew and possibly wrote the two-page story "Kaleidoscope of Fear" in Wham-O Giant Comics #1 (April 1967), published by the toy company Wham-O). drew three issues of Gold Key Comics' Doctor Solar, Man of the Atom (#24–26, July 1968–Jan. 1969), and contributed to Warren Publishing's black-and-white horror-comics magazines Creepy, Eerie, and Vampirella. Under the pen name Jack Purcell, he drew and lettered a story for rival Skywald Publications' Psycho #3 (May 1971).

In 1979, he collaborated with writer Roger McKenzie on an adaptation of Battlestar Galactica for Marvel Comics.

=== 1980s–2010s ===
At DC Comics, Colón co-created the historical fantasy Arak, Son of Thunder with writer Roy Thomas, with the character introduced in a special insert in The Warlord #48 (Aug. 1981). Two years later, he introduced Amethyst, Princess of Gemworld with writers Dan Mishkin and Gary Cohn in a similar preview in The Legion of Super-Heroes vol. 2 #298 (April 1983). Colón was an editor for DC Comics from 1982 to 1985 and oversaw titles such as Arion, Lord of Atlantis, The Flash, Green Lantern, and Wonder Woman.

His other artistic credits include Grim Ghost for Atlas/Seaboard Comics; Airboy for Eclipse Comics; Magnus: Robot Fighter for Valiant Comics; and Damage Control and Doom 2099 for Marvel Comics. Also for Marvel, Colón wrote, drew, colored and lettered the 1988 science-fiction graphic novel Ax. In the late 1980s, Colón penciled the short-lived Bullwinkle and Rocky series for Marvel's children's imprint Star Comics, edited by Sid Jacobson. Colón returned to Harvey with Jacobson in the early 1990s and worked on such projects as Monster in My Pocket and Ultraman. From 2005 until the tabloid's demise in 2007, he drew the weekly comic strip "SpyCat" in the Weekly World News.

Colón and Jacobson created a graphic novel version of the 9/11 Commission Report titled The 9/11 Report: A Graphic Adaptation (cover-dated Aug. 2006). They released a 160-page follow-up, After 9/11: America's War on Terror (Aug. 2008). The duo's A Graphic Biography: Che was released in 2009. The following year, Farrar, Straus and Giroux published their next collaboration, Anne Frank: The Anne Frank House Authorized Graphic Biography, published by Hill & Wang.

He collaborated with his author wife, Ruth Ashby, on the 2005 comic book A Spy for General Washington, telling the story of Revolutionary War secret agent Robert Townsend, and on the graphic novel The Great American Documents: Volume 1, published by Hill and Wang in May 2014. Colón reunited with writer Dan Mishkin to produce The Warren Commission Report: A Graphic Investigation Into the Kennedy Assassination in 2014.

== Personal life ==
In the U.S., Colón lived initially in Brooklyn, New York City, and later moved to the Long Island town of Huntington, New York.

He was married four times, his last to children's-book and young adult fiction author Ruth Ashby. He had four children, daughters Amanda, Suzan and Luisa Colón and Rebecca Ashby-Colón. He died in Huntington, New York on August 8, 2019, at the age of 88, of colorectal cancer diagnosed the previous year.

== Bibliography ==
Works by Colón:

=== Atlas/Seaboard Comics ===
- Grim Ghost #1–3 (1975)
- Thrilling Adventure Stories #1 (1975)
- Tiger-Man #1 (1975)
- Weird Tales of the Macabre #1 (1975)

=== DC Comics ===
- Amethyst, Princess of Gemworld #1–12 (1983–1984)
- Amethyst, Princess of Gemworld vol. 2 #1, 9–11, 13–16, Special #1 (1985–1986)
- Arak, Son of Thunder #1–14, 31, 37, Annual #1 (1981–1984)
- Atari Force vol. 2 #12 (1984)
- Blue Devil #6, 9 (1984–1985)
- The Brave and the Bold #179 (1981)
- Cosmic Boy #1–4 (1986–1987)
- DC Comics Presents #63 (1983)
- DC Graphic Novel #3 (1984)
- The Fury of Firestorm Annual #2 (1984)
- Heroes Against Hunger #1 (1986)
- House of Mystery #304–305 (I…Vampire) (1982)
- Legion of Super-Heroes vol. 2 #298 (Amethyst, Princess of Gemworld insert preview) (1983)
- Legion of Super-Heroes vol. 3 #11–12, 55, Annual #2 (1985–1988)
- Legionnaires 3 #1–4 (1986)
- Omega Men #31, Annual #2 (1985)
- Outsiders #9, 13 (1986)
- Scooby-Doo #2, 4, 6, 8 (1997–1998)
- Secret Origins vol. 2 #7, 10 (1986–1987)
- Tales of the Legion of Super-Heroes #324 (1985)
- Tales of the New Teen Titans #4 (1982)
- Teen Titans Spotlight #12 (1987)
- Underworld #1–4 (1987–1988)
- The Unexpected #220 (1982)
- The Warlord #48 (Arak, Son of Thunder insert preview) (1981)
- Weird War Tales #122, 124 (1983)
- Young Love #122 (1976)

=== Eclipse Comics ===
- Airboy #46–49 (1989)

=== Gold Key Comics ===
- Doctor Solar, Man of the Atom #24–26 (1968–1969)

=== Harvey Comics ===
- Beetlejuice #1 (1991)
- Casper and ... #1, 3 (1987–1988)
- Casper Digest #1 (1986)
- Casper in Space #6–8 (1973)
- Casper Space Ship #2, 4 (1972–1973)
- Casper Strange Ghost Stories #12 (1976)
- Casper TV Showtime #1, 5 (1980)
- Casper's Ghostland #93 (1976)
- Devil Kids Starring Hot Stuff #52, 60, 81 (1971–1977)
- The Friendly Ghost, Casper #28, 37, 87, 152, 207 (1960–1979)
- Harvey Collectors Comics #2 (1975)
- Harvey Wiseguys #1–4 (1987–1989)
- Hot Stuff #3 (1992)
- Hot Stuff the Little Devil #110, 117 (1972–1973)
- Jackie Jokers #1–4 (1973)
- Little Audrey Clubhouse #1 (1961)
- Little Dot #94 (1964)
- Little Dot vol. 2 #4 (1993)
- Little Dot Dotland #41 (1969)
- Little Dot's Uncles and Aunts #42 (1972)
- Little Lotta #78–79 (1968)
- Monster in My Pocket #1 (1991)
- New Kids on the Block: Magic Summer Tour #1 (1990)
- New Kids on the Block: NKOTB #1, 6 (1990–1991)
- Playful Little Audrey #64 (1966)
- Richie Rich #9, 200, 225 (1962–1987)
- Richie Rich vol. 2 #14 (1993)
- Richie Rich & Casper #1, 8, 22, 28, 33–34, 45 (1974–1982)
- Richie Rich & His Girl Friends #5, 10 (1980–1981)
- Richie Rich and the New Kids on the Block #1 (1991)
- Richie Rich and Timmy Time #1 (1977)
- Richie Rich and ... #11 (1990)
- Richie Rich Bank Book #24 (1976)
- Richie Rich Big Book #1 (1992)
- Richie Rich Dollars and Cents #78 (1977)
- Richie Rich Gold and Silver #1, 4 (1975–1976)
- Richie Rich Inventions #1 (1977)
- Richie Rich Millions #58 (1973)
- Richie Rich Money World #1, 3, 9, 16, 31, 41, 46 (1972–1980)
- Richie Rich Profits #2 (1974)
- Richie Rich Riches #28, 30, 32 (1977)
- Richie Rich Success Stories #23 (1969)
- Richie Rich Vaults of Mystery #9 (1976)
- Richie Rich Zillionz #2, 4, 11 (1977–1978)
- Shocking Tales Digest #1 (1981)
- Spooky #91, 133 (1966–1972)
- Spooky Spooktown #26, 43 (1968–1972)
- Superichie #8 (1977)
- Ultraman #-1, #1 (1994)
- Vacation Digest Magazine #1 (1987)
- Wendy the Good Little Witch #27, 49, 59–60, 67, 76, 86, 94 (1964–1990)
- Wendy the Good Little Witch vol. 2 #12 (1993)
- Wendy Witch World #46, 52 (1972–1973)

=== Malibu Comics ===
- Dreadstar vol. 2 #1–6 (1995–1996)

=== Marvel Comics ===
- 2099 Unlimited #8 (1995)
- Battlestar Galactica #1–3 (1979)
- Black Widow the Coldest War GN (1990)
- Casper #1 (1995)
- Damage Control #1–4 (1989)
- Damage Control vol. 2 #1–4 (1989–1990)
- Damage Control vol. 3 #2–4 (1991)
- Doom 2099 #9, 16 (1993–1994)
- Epic Illustrated #1–2 (1980)
- John Carter, Warlord of Mars #16–17, 19–21 (1978–1979)
- Marvel Age Annual #4 (1988)
- Marvel Comics Presents #19 (1989)
- Marvel Graphic Novel: Ax (1989)
- Marvel Spring Special #1 (Elvira, Mistress of the Dark adaptation) (1988)
- Marvel Super Special #8 (Battlestar Galactica adaptation); #10 (1979)
- Mighty Mouse #1–5, 7, 9 (1990–1991)
- Nightmask #2 (1986)
- Power Pack #53 (1990)
- Red Sonja vol. 2 #1–2 (1983)
- Savage Sword of Conan #46, 66 (1979–1981)

==== Star Comics ====
- Bullwinkle and Rocky #1–9 (1987–1989)
- Droids #6–8 (1987)
- The Flintstone Kids #1 (1987)
- Thundercats #14, 18, 20 (1987–1988)

=== Valiant Comics ===
- Magnus, Robot Fighter vol. 2 #7, 9, 13–16, 20 (1991–1993)
- Solar, Man of the Atom #5 (1992)

Preceded by n/a	Arak, Son of Thunder artist 1981–1982	Succeeded by Alfredo Alcala
Preceded by Len Wein	The Flash editor 1982–1983	Succeeded by Cary Bates
Preceded by Marv Wolfman	Green Lantern vol. 2 editor 1982–1983	Succeeded by Len Wein
Preceded by Marv Wolfman	Wonder Woman editor 1983	Succeeded by Alan Gold
