= Sid Jacobson =

American writer (1929–2022)

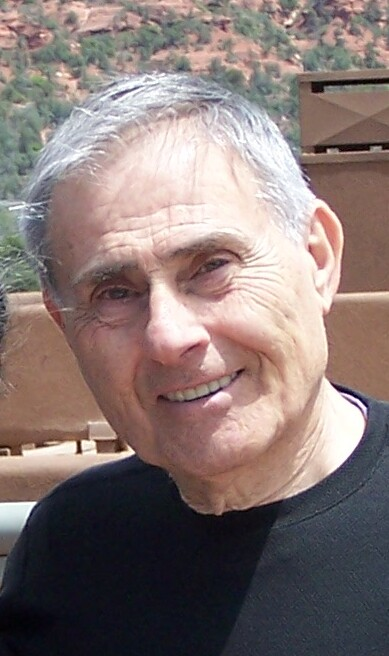
- Jacobson in 2007
- Born: Sidney Jacobson; October 20, 1929 New York City, U.S.
- Died: July 23, 2022 (aged 92) San Mateo, California, U.S.
- Notable works: Richie Rich; Hot Stuff; Casper the Friendly Ghost; The 9/11 Report: A Graphic Adaptation
- Awards: Inkpot Award, 2003

Sidney Jacobson (October 20, 1929 – July 23, 2022) was an American writer who worked in the fields of children's comic books, popular music, fiction, biography, and non-fiction comics. He was managing editor and editor-in-chief for Harvey Comics. Jacobson was also known for his late-career collaborations with artist Ernie Colón, including such nonfiction graphic novels as The 9/11 Report: A Graphic Adaptation and Anne Frank: The Anne Frank House Authorized Graphic Biography.

== Early life and education ==
Jacobson was born in Brooklyn, New York City, on October 20, 1929, the son of Beatrice (Edelman) and Reuben Jacobson. His parents were Jewish immigrants. Jacobson graduated from Abraham Lincoln High School, and then New York University, where he majored in journalism.

== Career ==
His first jobs out of school were at the New York tabloid The Compass and the horse racing paper The Morning Telegraph. In the 1950s and 1960s, while working at Harvey Comics, Jacobson wrote songs for such pop acts as Frankie Avalon ("A Boy Without a Girl"), Earl Grant ("(At) The End (of a Rainbow)"), Dion and the Belmonts, and Johnny Mathis, despite the fact that Jacobson did not read music. It was at Harvey that Jacobson met artist Ernie Colón, whose work he edited for many years both there and at Star Comics.

After his long stint at Harvey, Jacobson became an executive editor at Marvel Comics, where he helped create the children's imprint Star Comics. In addition to editing the entire Star line, Jacobson contributed scripts to some of the titles such as Wally the Wizard and Top Dog. He wrote comics adaptations of the films Santa Claus: The Movie (1985), Labyrinth (1986), Pinocchio and the Emperor of the Night (1987), and Elvira, Mistress of the Dark (1988).

During this period, Jacobson published the novel Streets of Gold (Pocket Books, 1985), a fictionalized history of his family's immigration journey from the shtetls of Russia to the United States.

Jacobson returned to Harvey Comics in the early 1990s, where he created a line of Hanna-Barbera comics and, original stories based on the animated TV series characters.

In 2006, Jacobson and his old Harvey colleague Ernie Colón teamed up as writer and illustrator to create a graphic novel version of the 9/11 Commission Report, titled The 9/11 Report: A Graphic Adaptation.

In 2008, they released a 160-page follow-up: After 9/11: America's War on Terror. Subsequent collaborations with Colón include A Graphic Biography: Che, released in 2009; and Anne Frank: The Anne Frank House Authorized Graphic Biography, published in 2010 by Hill & Wang in the U.S. and Uitgeverij Luitingh in the Netherlands.

== Personal life ==
Jacobson had two children, Seth and Kathy. He lived in Los Angeles.

== Death ==
On July 23, 2022, at age 92, Jacobsen died at a hospice facility in San Mateo, California, from complications of a stroke after contracting COVID-19.

== Awards ==
Sid Jacobson received an Inkpot Award in 2003.

== Bibliography ==
- The Ultimate Casper the Friendly Ghost ISBN 1-4165-0797-3
- The Ultimate Casper Comics Collection ISBN 1-59687-823-1
- The Ultimate Hot Stuff ISBN 1-4165-0835-X
- Streets of Gold (as "Sidney Jacobson") (Pocket Books, 1985) ISBN 0-671-44214-7
- Pete Reiser: The Rough-and-Tumble Career of the Perfect Ballplayer (McFarland & Company, 2004) ISBN 0-7864-1876-1
- The 9/11 Report: A Graphic Adaptation with Ernie Colón (Hill & Wang, 2006) ISBN 1-4177-5788-4
- After 9/11: America's War on Terror (2001- ) with Ernie Colón (2007) ISBN 0-8090-2370-9
- A Graphic Biography: Che (2009) with Ernie Colón ISBN 978-0-8090-9492-9
- Anne Frank: The Anne Frank House Authorized Graphic Biography with Ernie Colón (Hill & Wang, 2010)
