= Warren Kremer =

American comic creator (1921–2003)

- Born: June 26, 1921 The Bronx, New York, United States
- Died: July 24, 2003 (aged 82) Glen Ridge, New Jersey
- Area: Cartoonist
- Pseudonyms: Doc Kremer; Doc; R. Grey; R.G.; Flo Kraemer
- Notable works: Harvey Comics; Richie Rich; Hot Stuff the Little Devil; Stumbo the Giant; Planet Terry

Warren Kremer (June 26, 1921 – July 24, 2003) was an American comics cartoonist best known for his creation of the Harvey Comics characters Richie Rich, Hot Stuff the Little Devil and Stumbo the Giant. His style is known for big, bold compositions, and a keen sense of contrast and color.

== Biography ==
=== Childhood and early career ===
Kremer was born in The Bronx, the son of a sign painter. He had a sister, Anita. Kremer counted Alex Raymond's Flash Gordon and Hal Foster's Prince Valiant among his influences.

He attended the High School of Music and Art and the School of Industrial Art in New York City. Kremer then did layout, lettering, and illustrations for pulp and aviation magazines for ten years. He gradually took on more comics work in Ace Publications, his first title being Hap Hazard. He married that title's letterer, Grace. Due to a hernia, Kremer did not serve in World War II.

=== Harvey Comics (1948–1982) ===
Steve Mufatti, a friend and colleague of Kremer's, had a part in getting him work at Harvey Comics, starting with freelance work in 1948. Harvey editor Sid Jacobson was frustrated by the poor design of most comics at the time. He watched animated films and wanted to know why his comics couldn't look as good. So Kremer was brought on board to bring an animation design to comics. Kremer improved the layout of the panels, creating a much greater depth of field. His characters were better constructed, which added mass and allowed the books to look more "real". Eventually, Kremer's influence was felt throughout the entire comic book industry.

Kremer created or defined many of the most well known Harvey characters, including Casper the Ghost, Hot Stuff, Joe Palooka, Little Audrey, Little Max, Richie Rich, and Stumbo the Giant. Kremer also excelled at realistic treatments, producing top-quality work for Harvey's romance, war, and horror genre titles. He was the top artist at Harvey, where he worked for 35 years mostly as an art editor.

In addition to his regular pencilling, Kremer contributed animation storyboards, pencilled, inked and colored most of the thousands of covers for every one of Harvey's humor titles.

=== Later career (1983–1989) ===
After Harvey ended publication in 1982, Kremer created and/or drew several characters for Marvel Comics' Star Comics line, including Count Duckula, Ewoks, Planet Terry, Royal Roy, and Top Dog.

=== Personal life ===
Kremer was married to wife Grace, with whom he had two sons, Richard W. and Peter R., and two daughters, Maryanne Kremer-Ames and Suzanne Petrozzino.

In 1989, a stroke left him paralyzed on his left side, which included his drawing hand. Kremer died July 24, 2003, in Glen Ridge, New Jersey. He was living in nearby Bloomfield at the time of his death.
