= The End (Earl Grant song) =

1958 single by Earl Grant

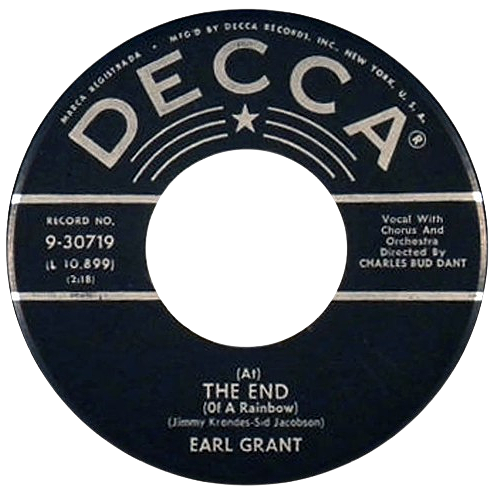

Single by Earl Grant
- B-side: "Hunky Dunky Doo"
- Released: August 1958
- Genre: Pop
- Length: 2:18
- Label: Decca
- Composer: Jimmy Krondes
- Lyricist: Sid Jacobson

Earl Grant singles chronology
"Kathy-O" (1958)	"The End" (1958)	"Evening Rain" (1958)

"The End" is a song with music by Jimmy Krondes and lyrics by Sid Jacobson. In 1958, the song was released in the United States as a 1958 single by Earl Grant. Grant's single on the Decca label, featured the orchestra of Charles "Bud" Dant; some pressings of the single were shown with the title "(At) The End (Of A Rainbow)".

== Chart performance ==
The single was Grant's only entry into the U.S. Top 40, and spent 19 weeks on the Billboard Hot 100 reaching No. 7, while reaching No. 16 on Billboard's "Hot R&B Sides". In Canada it was No. 5 for 2 weeks.

Grant also released a German version of the song, titled Jeder Tag geht zu Ende (Every Day Comes to an End), which reached No. 12 on the German charts.

== Cover versions ==
- Nancy Sinatra recorded a cover version for her 1966 album Nancy in London.
- Steve Lawrence released a cover in 1973 which reached No. 46 on the Billboard Easy Listening survey.

== In popular culture ==
The song was featured in the sixth episode of the Marvel Cinematic Universe show Moon Knight, "Gods and Monsters".
