= Stumbo the Giant =

Stumbo

Publication information
- Publisher: Harvey Comics
- First appearance: Hot Stuff #2 (December 1957)
- Created by: Warren Kremer

In-story information
- Species: Giant
- Team affiliations: Tinytown
- Abilities: Size, strength

Stumbo the Giant is a fictional Harvey Comics character. He lives right next to Tinytown, and everyone in Tinytown loves him, despite his tendencies to keep them awake with his loud snoring, or to shake up the town with his laughter or by accidentally stomping or falling on the ground. However, he never means to do these things and always has Tinytown's best interests at heart. Among his best friends are Tinytown's Officer O'Floodle and The Mayor.

According to Toonopedia, Stumbo's creator was Warren Kremer, and the giant first appeared in 1957. He mostly appeared as a secondary character in Harvey's Hot Stuff comics but also had a comic series of his own from August 1963 to November 1966.

Stumbo used to crush houses by accident and then he would diligently help them re-build, perhaps even better. His only enemy in Tinytown was Dr. Cesspoole who would never miss a chance to put the giant to shame in eyes of Tinytown's inhabitants or somehow embarrass him with various rays, noises, etc., so he could take over Tinytown. Stumbo always thwarted him, sometimes without even knowing. Dr. Cesspoole also hated giants in general.

The other side of Stumbo's storage volcano was the base of a sly army of mischievous trolls who would always have an eye to taking over Tinytown, and of course their only obstacle was Stumbo, who would turn them away every time by scaring them away.

Stumbo has a little brother, Thumbo, and a nephew, Chumbo. Stumbo was also friends with a Chinese giant.

Stumbo had a cameo on the cover of Richie Rich V1 #39.

Harvey Hits #78 had a supporting character that resembled John F. Kennedy.

== Styles ==
Stumbo was drawn in two styles. The original and one in which he (and other characters) were chubbier and less intelligent looking.

== Other characters ==
- Officer (Orville) O'Floodle
- The Mayor (of Tinytown)
- Mr. Thatch
- Doc Sawbones

== Titles ==
- Stumbo Tinytown #1 - August 1963
- Stumbo the Giant
