= Demon Hunter (comics) =

The Demon Hunter
- Cover art for The Demon Hunter #1, art by Rich Buckler.

Publication information
- Publisher: Atlas/Seaboard
- First appearance: The Demon Hunter #1 (September 1975)
- Created by: David Anthony Kraft, Rich Buckler

In-story information
- Alter ego: Gideon Cross
- Abilities: Enhanced strength, agility and reflexes Invisibility; Shapeshifting

The Demon Hunter, created by David Anthony Kraft and Rich Buckler, is a superhero first featured in The Demon Hunter #1 (September 1975) from Atlas/Seaboard Comics. The series lasted only one issue due to Atlas Comics going out of business.

The character idea was later used by Buckler and Kraft for their "Devil-Slayer" character at Marvel Comics in 1977 and "Bloodwing" for Buckler's magazine Galaxia in 1980.

== Fictional character biography ==
The story begins with the sight of a sniper, who has a man named Damian Severs in his sights. The Demon Hunter (Gideon Cross) while masking his presence, sneaks up on the sniper. Gideon recognizes the sniper and recalls serving with him in the armed forces. Before he fires a shot, Gideon materializes and gives the sniper a choice to either face him or throw himself from the cliff. Frightful of his choice, the sniper jumps from the cliff to his death. The reader is then shown that Gideon Cross is a member of the Harvester of Night Cult in a flashback.

Back in the present, Gideon goes to the home of Damian Severs, in order to receive payment for his protection. While he is given money, he is also waiting to receive some of Damian's blood, to be placed inside a flask. This price is part of every job he performs as payment to the Harvester of Night Cult. Damian then proceeds to hire Gideon for a contract killing of his partner, who turns out to be a Mafia Kingpin, that will be visiting Jamaica. Though Gideon begins to question why he has been doing these types of jobs, he agrees on the contract.

Gideon is then seen walking through an airport, masking his identity and costume so that no one can see his true nature. He is heading to his home. Once there, he begins to rest and dream of how he became a Harvester of Eyes for the Night Cult. He remembers being doubtful about the Night Cult and the claims about them, but also how they helped him regain purpose in his life having returned from Vietnam with little care for anything or anyone. This instills more doubt about being associated with Night Cult.

Some time later Gideon acts a bodyguard for Damian Severs in a drug trading transaction. During the deal, Damian tells Gideon of how this deal would allow him to go "straight", and once and for all settle things with his partner, whom Gideon is contracted to kill. Gideon is next seen arriving at the airport again, days later, awaiting a flight to Jamaica to fulfill his contract for Damian Severs. While waiting, Gideon sees a newspaper headline about how Damian Severs has committed suicide. Realizing this to be a ruse, Gideon resigns in his mind that Damian was murdered.

As with every blood transaction, Gideon has to deliver the flask of blood to an agent of the Night Cult. The meeting to perform this task happens to be in a storage room in the airport. When Gideon enters he is attacked by what looks like a ferocious demon, but is really an illusion-casting demon with very little power. Gideon defeats the demon and is made aware by the demon of how the Night Cult has sense that he would eventually betray them and their beliefs. This causes Gideon to finally start to search for some answers, and instead of going to Jamaica he goes to Nigeria, back to the sacred temple of the Night Cult.

The temple, called the Dark Retreat, is atop a mountain hidden in a side dimension that appears to be 13 tombstones in a circular shape. Once Gideon crosses between two of the tombstones, he is transported to the Secret Sanctum of the Harvesters of Night Cult. Through flashback, it is shown the ceremony that made him the Demon Hunter. Once inside the sanctum, he is surprised to see that his spell of invisibility hides him from the eyes of the Night Cult. He watches as the Night Cult sacrifices a man on an altar. This sacrifice is to revive the demon Astoroth, the Grand Duke of Hell. He is set on having the demon race reborn on Earth, otherwise known as Xenogenesis. As Gideon watches this ceremony, he realizes how unmatched he is and decides to regroup and plan for their arrival, expecting that the Night Cult will eventually come for him. What Gideon does not see is that the man that was sacrificed was Sever’s ex-partner, who is now the reincarnation of Astoroth.

As Gideon is traveling back to the states, he does not notice that Astoroth is also on the plane across the aisle from him, watching him. Astoroth smiles eerily, knowing that Gideon does not what is in store for him. Gideon is thinking of how he will defeat Astoroth and prevent Xenogenesis from happening, which has become the new purpose of his alter ego, the Demon Hunter.

== Powers and abilities ==
Gideon's powers seem to be all based in magic. They were granted to him by the Harvesters of Night Cult in order for him to become their Harvester of Eyes, a designation they have for their Demon Hunters. His strength, agility, and senses have all been heightened to a higher degree than normal.

== Paraphernalia ==
Gideon wears a costume and cloak that also grants him the ability to mask his presence and appearance from those unaware of magic. He uses this for a variety of effects which include invisibility, and shapeshifting.
