= Planet Terry =

- Planet Terry #1, art by Warren Kremer. Seen from left to right are: Robota, Planet Terry, Omnus.

Publication information
- Publisher: Marvel Comics
- Schedule: Monthly
- Format: Ongoing
- Genre: Superhero, science fiction
- Publication date: April 1985 - March 1986
- No. of issues: 12

Creative team
- Written by: Lennie Herman
- Penciller: Warren Kremer
- Inker: Vince Colletta
- Colorist: Peter Kremer

Planet Terry is an American science fiction comic book aimed at young children. Published by Star Comics, an imprint of Marvel Comics, the title lasted 12 issues, from April 1985 to March 1986. The title was authored by Lennie Herman, the writer of Star Comics books Top Dog and Royal Roy, and illustrated by artist Warren Kremer, who had previously worked for Harvey Comics.

== Story ==
Planet Terry (a pun on the word "planetary", meaning of or relating to planets) followed the eponymous Terry on his quest to find his parents, officers on the spaceship Space Warp, who accidentally launched him off the craft. Thinking him lost forever, Terry's parents went on with their lives, unsuspecting that the ship and Terry, had, in fact, survived. Along with a female robot named Robota rescued from a junk heap, and a muscular, green-scaled alien called Omnus, Terry had several misadventures while scanning the galaxy for his parents.

Though there were frequently hints of a larger, grander plotline, or even a connection to the mainstream Marvel Universe and Earth-616, Planet Terry's story was never fully resolved before its cancellation, and the characters made no appearances in any other Star Comics titles before the line was discontinued.

Updated versions of the Terry characters, as well as several other Marvel-owned Star Comics characters, were featured in the 2009 X-Babies miniseries.

Planet Terry makes an appearance, now as a bounty hunter, in the 2015 Drax comic book series by CM Punk. He turns to more heroic pursuits, such as making sure kidnapped kids return home safely and helping to subdue a thrill killing mercenary. His partner in this is Cammi, a former ally of Drax.

Planet Terry makes another appearance as an adult in the Asgardians of the Galaxy series #6.
