= Jackie Jokers =

- Cover of Jackie Jokers issue #1.

Publication information
- Publisher: Harvey Comics
- First appearance: Jackie Jokers #1 (1973)
- Created by: Ernie Colón (art)

In-story information
- Full name: Jackie Jokers
- Species: Human
- Supporting character of: Richie Rich

Jackie Jokers is a supporting character in the Richie Rich comic book franchise from Harvey Comics. He has a black bowl haircut and works as a professional entertainer.

Jokers debuted in 1973 in his eponymous title before being cancelled and replaced by the title Richie Rich and Jackie Jokers later that year. He and his similar-looking father, Jerry Jokers, are both stand-up comedians, but Jackie often takes his indulgences of other performing and creative arts to comical extremes. Ben Booker, Jackie's talent agent, is also featured. In every issue of Richie Rich and Jackie Jokers, a featured story would always show Jackie doing a parody of current films, TV shows, or commercials.

== Titles ==
- Jackie Jokers - 4 issues, 1973
- Richie Rich and Jackie Jokers — 48 issues, 1973–82
