= Grim Ghost =

- The Grim Ghost #2 (March 1975), cover art by Ernie Colón.

Publication information
- Publisher: Atlas/Seaboard Comics; Ardden Entertainment
- First appearance: The Grim Ghost #1 (Jan. 1975)
- Created by: Michael Fleisher

In-story information
- Alter ego: Matthew Dunsinane

The Grim Ghost is a superhero created by writer Michael Fleisher and artist Ernie Colón who debuted in The Grim Ghost #1 (cover-dated Jan. 1975) from Atlas/Seaboard Comics. The series lasted three issues before the company went out of business in January 1976. A new ongoing series published by a revival of Atlas Comics in association with Ardden Entertainment, debuted in 2010.

== Publication history ==
Atlas/Seaboard Comics' The Grim Ghost ran three issues (cover-dated Jan.-July 1975. Writer co-creator Michael Fleisher scripted the first two issues, and Jenny Blake Isabella the third. Artist co-creator Ernie Colón drew all three. A new ongoing series, published by a revival of Atlas Comics in association with Ardden Entertainment, debuted with a #0 preview (Oct. 2010) before issue #1 (March 2011). The new series' trademarked cover logo is The Grim Ghost while its copyrighted title given in the postal indicia is simply Grim Ghost.

== Fictional character biography ==
The Grim Ghost #0 (October 2010), cover art by Qing Ping Mui.

In Colonial America, Irish immigrant silversmith Matthew Dunsinane was secretly the masked highwayman known as the Grim Ghost and was quite successful at his criminal trade until the dashing rogue was finally betrayed by a woman and captured in 1743. After he was hanged, his soul went to Hell where the Devil gave him a choice: either suffer for his crimes forever or become an agent of Satan's on Earth to bring evil souls to Hell. Returning to Earth in the 20th century (where longer lifespans were keeping the wicked from going to Hell long past when they were due), he became the Grim Ghost in form as well as name, now riding a flying black horse and firing spectral pistols whose "bullets" transported still-living murderers and thieves down to the flames of perdition while posing as a living descendant of himself who resided in the house he had owned over two centuries before. His greatest mission was to capture the demon Brimstone, who wanted to overthrow the Devil and rule Hell in his place. In order to do this, the Devil forced Matthew to work with Lady Sarah Braddock, the woman who originally set him up to get caught and hanged.

== 2010–11 revival ==
The Grim Ghost and his arch nemesis, Braddock, a man turned dark spirit, struggle in the Fringe, a realm between life and death. A recent arrival, Michael Colavito, is caught between the two. Ardden Entertainment published seven issues (The Grim Ghost #0-6).

== Other characters with this name ==
An earlier character called the Gay Ghost has since been named the Grim Ghost due to the modern connotations of the word "gay".
