= Atlas/Seaboard Comics =

American publisher (1974–1975)

Seaboard Periodicals
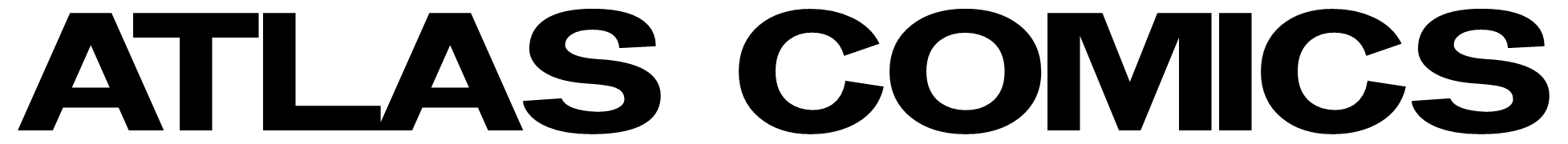

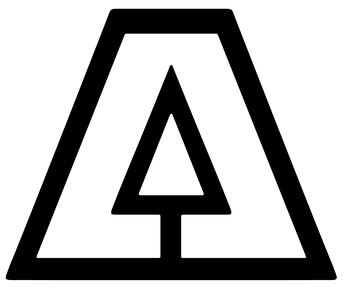
- A variant of the logo used for Atlas/Seaboard Comics
- Industry: Publishing
- Founded: June 1974; 52 years ago
- Defunct: 1975; 51 years ago
- Fate: Dissolved
- Headquarters: 717 Fifth Avenue, Manhattan, New York City, New York, United States
- Key people: Martin Goodman; Charles Goodman; Larry Lieber; Jeff Rovin
- Products: Comic books
- Owner: Martin Goodman

Atlas/Seaboard Comics is a line of comic books published by the American company Seaboard Periodicals in the 1970s. Though the line was published under the brand Atlas Comics, comic book historians and collectors refer to it as Atlas/Seaboard Comics to differentiate it from the 1950s Atlas Comics, which became Marvel Comics. Seaboard was located on Fifth Avenue in Manhattan, New York City.

== History ==
=== Company creation ===
Marvel Comics founder and Magazine Management publisher Martin Goodman left Marvel in 1972, having sold the company in 1968. He created Seaboard Periodicals, which opened its office on June 24, 1974, to compete in a field then dominated by Marvel and DC Comics. Goodman hired Warren Publishing veteran Jeff Rovin to edit the color comic-book line, and writer-artist Larry Lieber, brother of Marvel editor-in-chief Stan Lee, as editor of Atlas' black-and-white comics magazines.

Rovin said in 1987 he became involved after answering an ad in The New York Times:

I was one of several people Martin interviewed, and I got the job because I'd had experience not only in comics but in mail order, the latter of which was to contribute significantly to Seaboard's cash flow. Sharing editorial duties on the comics was writer-artist Larry Lieber, whom Martin had long wanted to transplant from under the shadow of Larry's brother.... Larry ended up handling about a quarter of Atlas' output — primarily the police, Western [and] war [comics], and color anthologies of horror stories.

Lieber became editor of the color comics following Rovin's departure. Steve Mitchell was the comics' production manager, and John Chilly the black-and-white magazines' art director. Goodman offered an editorial position to Roy Thomas, who had recently stepped down as Marvel Comics editor-in-chief, but Thomas turned it down, recalling in 1981 that, "[I] didn't have any faith in his lasting it out. The field was too shaky for a new publisher."

Lieber recalled in a 1999 interview,

When I went there, Martin put out two kinds of books. He was putting out color comics, and he was also going to put out black-and-white comics like Warren and Marvel. Now, I knew nothing about black-and-white comics, right? My only experience was in the color comics. Jeff Rovin came from Warren, and he knew nothing about color comics. Martin unfortunately put Jeff in charge of all the color comics and put me in charge of the black-and-white books. It was an unfortunate thing, and basically what happened was that Jeff's books didn't turn out so well... Martin had to pay high freelance rates, because otherwise nobody would work for a new and unproven company... It didn't work out too well, and Jeff finally left angrily or something, and I had to take over all his books. At this point, business was bad, and I tried to do what I could. One of the things I had to do was to cut rates and tell people they were going to make less money, which was not an enviable position.

=== Dissolution ===
Atlas Comics Seaboard offered very competitive rates, along with the return of original artwork to artists and author rights to the original character creations. These perks attracted such top names as Neal Adams, Steve Ditko, Russ Heath, John Severin, Alex Toth and Wally Wood, as well as such up-and-coming talents as Howard Chaykin and Rich Buckler.

However, the line was plagued by distribution problems which prevented the comics from reaching many regions. Moreover, readers quickly lost interest in the books, finding them to be obvious knock-offs of what Marvel Comics was publishing at the time; The Brute, for instance, had strong similarities to the Hulk, while Blazing Battle Tales imitated Sgt. Fury and his Howling Commandos.

With the Atlas line losing money across the board and the already insufficient sales dropping, Martin Goodman dissolved the company in the fourth quarter of 1975. A total of 23 comics titles and five comics magazines were published before the company folded. No title lasted more than four issues. Of the characters, Chaykin's Scorpion would inspire his Dominic Fortune at Marvel and Rich Buckler's Demon Hunter would inspire his Devil-Slayer at Marvel.

=== Chip Goodman ===
Some reports at the time suggested Goodman was angered that Cadence, the new Marvel owners, had reneged on a promise to keep his son, Charles "Chip" Goodman, as Marvel's editorial director. Marvel and Atlas writer Gary Friedrich recalled: "I never really felt that [Martin] did it for that reason. I think he did it to make money and that he thought with Larry in charge and paying good rates that he could do it. Now, he probably wouldn't have minded if it would have taken a bite out of Marvel's profits, but I don't think it was done out of revenge. I think Martin was too smart for that." Marvel art director John Romita, however, believed, "Chip was supposed to take his place. But that part of it must not have been on paper, because as soon as Martin was gone, they got rid of Chip. That's why Martin started Atlas Comics. It was pure revenge".

Although Chip Goodman was also in charge of the Seaboard comics, he had little to no interest in comic books, according to Rovin. Historian and one-time Marvel editor-in-chief Roy Thomas recalled: "One of the problems was just being Martin Goodman's son. I don't think that Martin respected Chip very much—he put Chip in charge but would treat him with less than benign contempt in front of other people. Martin was a little cruel sometimes."

This father-son conflict was fictionalized by a Magazine Management staffer, Ivan Prashker, who wrote a short story with a thinly disguised, unflattering portrait of a character based on Chip Goodman. When this story, "The Boss's Son", was published in the February 1970 issue of Playboy, Prashker expected he might be fired, but instead, as comics historian Jon B. Cooke wrote, he "was rewarded with his own editorship of a magazine as Martin was apparently more impressed that one of his staffers was published in the premier men's magazine than with any insult made to his son."

=== Revival ===
Circa 2010, Martin Goodman's grandson Jason Goodman announced a partnership with Ardden Entertainment to relaunch Atlas Comics starting with two "#0" issues featuring the Grim Ghost and Phoenix. With another character, Wulf the Barbarian, they were the stars of a miniseries, Atlas Unified, announced in September 2011 for publication that November.

Jason Goodman's Nemesis Group Inc. belatedly discovered that one Jeffrey Stevens had acquired the trademark "Atlas Comics" for comic books in October 2005. Nemesis filed suit in 2010, arguing that Stevens had no demonstrated use of the trademark. On March 13, 2012, the Trademark Trial and Appeal Board allowed the case to proceed to trial, but as a result of Nemesis Group Inc. failing to file a brief on the case in the required time, the petition was dismissed with prejudice in 2013. Stevens assigned the trademark to Dynamite Characters LLC in August 2014. In February 2016, Nemesis Group filed a new Atlas Comics logo at the United States Patent and Trademark Office for a possible challenge to Dynamite's registration.

A new Atlas company was formed by May 2019 with SP Media Group owning a majority and Goodman retaining an interest.

== Titles ==
George Torjussen's cover to Devilina #2 (May 1975), one of Atlas/Seaboard's black-and-white comics magazines

The Scorpion #1 (Feb. 1975), cover art by Howard Chaykin

=== Comics ===
Source unless otherwise noted:

- Barbarians featuring Ironjaw (1 issue)
- Blazing Battle Tales featuring Sgt. Hawk (1 issue)
- The Brute (3 issues)
- The Cougar (2 issues, created by Steve Mitchell)
- Demon Hunter (1 issue)
- The Destructor (4 issues, art by Steve Ditko and Wally Wood, who inked the first two issues)
- Fright featuring Son of Dracula (1 issue)
- The Grim Ghost (3 issues)
- Hands of the Dragon (1 issue)
- Ironjaw (4 issues, #1 and #2 cover art by Neal Adams)
- Morlock 2001 (3 issues; #3 retitled Morlock 2001 and the Midnight Men)
- Phoenix (4 issues; last issue retitled Phoenix...The Protector)
- Planet of Vampires (3 issues)
- Police Action featuring Lomax and Luke Malone (3 issues)
- Savage Combat Tales featuring Sgt. Stryker's Death Squad (3 issues)
- The Scorpion (3 issues)
- Tales of Evil (3 issues; the Bog Beast in #2, Man-Monster and the Bog Beast in #3)
- Targitt (3 issues; #2 retitled as John Targitt...Man Stalker on cover)
- Tiger-Man (3 issues)
- Vicki (4 issues, reprint of Tower Comics' humor title Tippy Teen)
- Weird Suspense featuring the Tarantula (3 issues)
- Western Action featuring Kid Cody and Comanche Kid (1 issue)
- Wulf the Barbarian (4 issues)

=== Magazines ===
- Devilina (2 issues)
- Gothic Romances (1 issue)
- Movie Monsters (4 issues)
- Thrilling Adventure Stories (2 issues; Tiger-Man in #1)
- Weird Tales of the Macabre (2 issues; the Bog Beast in #2)

== Film adaptations ==
After purchasing the Atlas characters and IPs from Nemesis Group in May 2019, the company announced plans for theatrical releases starting in 2021. Akiva Goldsman and his Weed Road Pictures were hired to run a writers' room to develop 10 story outlines with one to be selected for further development. Paramount Pictures signed a first-look contract. Atlas appointed Goodman as head of publishing and executive producer, and Spike Seldin as president of production. On August 28, 2024, it was announced that Paramount will launch a cinematic universe based on characters from Atlas Comics starting with Devilina.
