= Harvey Hits =

American comic book series published by Harvey Comics

Harvey Hits is an American comic book series, published by Harvey Comics. The series ran from September 1957 to November 1967; in all, 122 issues were published. Harvey Hits was similar to DC Comics' Showcase in that it was an anthology tryout series which often featured characters that did not have their own comic series. Harvey Hits should not be confused with Harvey Comics Hits, which ran in the early 1950s, or Harvey Hits Comics, which ran from 1986-87 during a revival of the Harvey Comics line.

Several issues of Harvey Hits are notable. Issue #3 (November 1957) was the first comic book to feature Richie Rich prominently; #7 (March 1958) was the first comic devoted to Wendy, the Good Little Witch.

Besides Richie Rich and Wendy, many other characters featured in Harvey Hits later received their own comic magazine, including Little Sad Sack and Stumbo the Giant.

By the mid-1960s, Harvey Hits settled on a rotating cast of characters that appeared every few months, including Muttsy, G.I. Juniors, and Gabby Gob. G.I. Juniors were featured in the last issue of Harvey Hits, #122, cover dated November 1967.

In 2017, a new version of Harvey Hits was published by Joe Books, a Canadian-based publishing house and book packager. The book features art by various artists, including Art Baltazar.
