= Tiger-Man =

Tiger-themed superhero

Tiger-Man is a tiger-themed superhero who appeared in a self-titled series published by Atlas/Seaboard Comics in 1975.

== Publication history ==
The first appearance of "Tiger-Man" was in the first issue of Thrilling Adventure Stories, February 1975, a black and white magazine. The story was written by John Albano with art by Ernie Colón.

The first issue of Tiger-Man was published with a cover date of April 1975. The writing credit is given to Gabe Levy with the artwork credited to Ernie Colón. The next two issues were cover-dated June and September 1975. Gerry Conway is credited as the writer for these two issues. Steve Ditko is given solo credit as the artist for issue #2 and given a co-credit with Al Milgrom for issue #3. Tiger-Man was cancelled after three issues.

== Fictional character biography ==
Tiger-Man is Dr. Lancaster Hill, a scientist who has isolated the chromosomes that give the tiger its strength and agility. He is in Africa while performing his 2-year internship, working from a village in Zambia that has been using the services of a local witch doctor named Na'Bantu. When the Na'Bantu has a conversation with the village chief, he seeks to punish Dr. Hill for having caused the villagers to doubt his ability to treat their medical problems. Overly eager to see the results of his work, Dr. Hill injects himself with a solution containing the tiger chromosomes. He feels his strength, agility and ferocity increase to that of a tiger. That night, a jealous Na'Bantu releases the tiger that Dr. Hill has been performing experiments on and when Dr. Hill is leaving his tent, the tiger attacks but Dr. Hill meets the attack with his new abilities and kills the tiger. Within the time that it takes to finish his internship, the chief presents Dr. Hill with a costume made from the hide of the attacking tiger and tells Dr. Hill that wearing it will increase his cunning. Dr. Hill then departs for the states.

Upon his return to the United States, Dr. Hill is picked up from the airport by his sister Anna, who informs him that he received an offer letter to start practicing medicine at the Harlem Hospital on the following Monday. Dr. Hill is dropped off at home by his sister and she goes off to theater rehearsal, where she is murdered by two visiting rodeo cowboys. Dr. Hill is called to the crime scene and is shown the evidence of a torn piece of fabric that his sister clutched in her hand, and told of a phone call she made to the police where she says the word "bald" over and over as she dies. Dr. Hill picks up the scent on the fabric and realizes that it smells of horses. Dr. Hill dons his Tiger-Man costume and sets out to track down his sister's killer. While searching for the killer, Tiger-Man stumbles across two thugs trying to mug a nurse. Tiger-Man stops them with very deadly force and warns the nurse about walking at night in the city.

After tracking down the bald cowboy to a visiting rodeo, Tiger-Man realizes that the scent on the cloth is not completely his and that he must have had an accomplice. Tiger-Man follows the bald cowboy to a bar and attacks the two cowboys, but he still feels unfulfilled afterward. He decides to use his powers to hunt down criminals.

Dr. Hill starts practicing medicine at the Harlem Hospital, but at night he patrols the city looking for wrong-doers. He stumbles upon a pack of bank robbers who are wearing electrified suits that repel bullets, but also electrocute anyone that the wearers touch. In this case, they electrocute two police officers who try to prevent them from getting away from the scene of the robbery. Tiger-Man comes in on the tail end of the attack and exacts his revenge against the robbers and interrogates one of them to find out where they got their suits from. One of them finally gives him the name of Dr. Kobart. Tiger-Man departs leaving one of the criminals alive who faints.

Unknown to Tiger-Man he is being watched and pursued by the Blue Leopard, another enhanced person from the Zambian village he did his internship at. The Blue Leopard attacks Tiger-Man and though they very evenly matched, his claws are laced with drugs that cause Tiger-Man to pass out. The Blue Leopard warns Tiger-Man that this was only a dress rehearsal for the ending battle where his claws will be laced with poison instead of just a sedative. He then departs leaving Tiger-Man to sleep through to the next day. Tiger-Man awakens at around noon the next day and rushes from rooftop to rooftop to get to the Harlem Hospital to begin his shift. While working, Dr. Hill is consumed by the events of the previous day and contemplates what to do about the Blue Leopard. Seeing no way of finding him, Dr. Hill decides to pay a visit to Dr. Kobart. Once he has found him, he is surprised to see the Blue Leopard has killed him and framed Tiger-Man for the crime. While Tiger-Man is investigating the crime scene, the Blue Leopard appears in the window and tells Tiger-Man his origin. The Blue Leopard is a member of the village in Zambia that Dr. Hill did his internship. After Dr. Hill left the village at the end of his internship, people started to starve to death and Na'Bantu the witch doctor blamed Dr. Hill and his white man's medicine. The Blue Leopard was given a potion created by Na'Bantu which increased his strength to 3 times of a normal man, and gave him the ceremonial Blue Leopard skin to wear, similar to the tiger mane and claws worn by Tiger-Man. Tiger-Man and the Blue Leopard battle again, with no one winning due to the police arriving. The Blue Leopard runs off into the night laughing, knowing that he has implicated Tiger-Man for the murder.

Later, Tiger-Man rushes to a burn victim into the Harlem Hospital, where he works as Dr. Hill. He starts shouting orders to the staff, almost giving his secret identity away. In a flashback the man he brought in had set himself ablaze with suicidal thoughts running through his mind. In the present Tiger-Man leaves the hospital and sneaks into a broom closet to change into this working clothes as Dr. Lancaster Hill. Dr. Hill is a part of the team operating on the burn victim, but the man dies from his severe trauma, but not before he utters the word "hypnos". A couple of days later, Tiger-Man is witnesses another suicide. An elderly woman steps on the tracks in front of a subway train. Moving as quickly as he can Tiger-Man can not stop the train from striking the woman dead. Tiger-Man then decides to investigate these strange suicides.

Finding out that the elderly woman, named Hannah Markham, was a patient at a free psychiatric clinic in midtown run by Dr. Otto Kaufmann, Dr. Hill decides he will pay the doctor a visit to get to the bottom of this mystery. Dr. Hill's visit turns out to be waste of time as Dr. Kaufmann is adamant about sharing any information on his patients with Dr. Hill. As Dr. Hill is leaving, another patient of Dr. Kaufmann's steps in to let him know that she is ready for their session.

That evening, Tiger-Man attempts to stop an out of control automobile from plunging into the river. Not acting fast enough, the car soon plunges into the deep waters off a bridge. Tiger-Man manages to pull the victim from the car and bring her to the surface. He recognizes the woman at once as she was at the free clinic when Dr. Hill visited Dr. Kaufmann. In shock, she utters the name "Hypnos". Dr. Hill then decides that it is now time for Tiger-Man to visit Dr. Kaufmann.

Tiger-Man breaks into the clinic and begins to look through Dr. Kaufmann's patient files. He finds records of suicides that have happened, and suicides that are due to happen in the near future. Dr. Kaufmann then enters the office and notices Tiger-Man going through his files. He is easily beaten by Tiger-Man, but quickly recovers. He then uses a psychic ray through his monocle that hypnotizes Tiger-Man, which reveals that Dr. Kaufmann is in actuality Hypnos. Hypnos orders Tiger-Man to take his own life by setting himself aflame. Tiger-Man leaves the clinic with nothing else on his mind.

At a nearby gas station, Tiger-Man doses himself with gasoline. He is spotted by two thugs, who have recently robbed the gas station and see him as an easy victim. In a trance-like state, Tiger-Man is knocked unconscious by these two thugs who complain about him not having any money or valuables in his costume. The smack to his head that he receives releases Hypnos' hold over Tiger-Man.

Tiger-Man returns to the clinic to defeat Hypnos. The battle moves to the building's rooftop and Tiger-Man manages to avoid the psychic rays of Hypnos. He removes Kaufmann's monocle and turns it on him. Hypnotized by the ray, Kaufmann realizes that death is the only answer and leaps off the building, committing suicide in the process.

== Powers and abilities ==
Dr. Hill as Tiger-Man possesses the strength, speed, agility and ferocity of an actual tiger in its most primal state. This ferocity sometimes grows to the point where it is hard to concentrate and Dr. Hill becomes lost in rage. Drinking samples of the tiger's milk that he preserved is able to increase his IQ by "120 points".

== Costume ==
As Tiger-Man, Dr. Hill wears a unitard, gauntlets, and boots made from the hide of a tiger that attacked him and which he subsequently defeated. The costume grants Dr. Hill enhanced cunning, allowing him to hunt prey and move with great stealth while in hunting mode.
