= Hot Stuff the Little Devil =

Harvey Comics character

Publication information
- Publisher: Harvey Comics
- First appearance: Hot Stuff #1 (October 1957)
- Created by: Warren Kremer

In-story information
- Full name: Hot Stuff
- Species: Devil
- Team affiliations: Tridie
- Abilities: Flight, fire-related abilities, invisibility, teleportation, magic

Hot Stuff the Little Devil is a character appearing in American comic books. Created by Warren Kremer, he first appeared in Hot Stuff #1 (October 1957), published by Harvey Comics. Imbued with a mischievous personality and able to produce fire, Hot Stuff appears as a red child devil who wears a diaper (said to be made of asbestos) and carries a magical sentient pitchfork (referred to as his "trusty trident"), which is a character in its own right. Much to the consternation of his demonic brethren, Hot Stuff sometimes performs good deeds to irritate them. Though often compared to other Harvey Comics supernatural characters such as Casper the Friendly Ghost and Wendy the Good Little Witch, Hot Stuff is portrayed as much more wrathful and loves pulling pranks on others.

== Publication history ==
Created and first drawn by Warren Kremer, Hot Stuff has appeared in at least eight comic book titles including:

- Hot Stuff Sizzlers (1960)
- Devil Kids Starring Hot Stuff (1962)
- Hot Stuff Creepy Caves (1974)

The character also appeared in multiple back-up stories between the periods 1957-1982 and 1986-1991, along with sporadic appearances in other publications during the 1990s and 2000s. The most recent appearance of Hot Stuff was in 2009 with Casper the Friendly Ghost and Wendy the Good Little Witch, when a three-issue comic book miniseries was published by Arden Entertainment called Casper and the Spectrals.

Warren Kremer and Howard Post were the artists who helped define the look of Hot Stuff, drawing many comic book covers and stories over the years. Ernie Colón was another major comics artist who drew Hot Stuff.

While Harvey Comics flagship characters Casper the Friendly Ghost, Spooky and Wendy the Good Little Witch often crossed over into each other's stories, Hot Stuff rarely appeared with them. Instead, the little devil would be featured with characters like Stumbo the Giant (created by Warren Kremer and Larz Bourne, and appeared in back-up stories in Hot Stuff comics in 1957), Katnip the cat, Herman the mouse and good fairy Princess Charma. While they often tended to annoy or anger Hot Stuff, their appearances served to further develop Hot Stuff's character.

== Comic book series ==
- Hot Stuff the Little Devil
- Devil Kids Starring Hot Stuff
- Hot Stuff Creepy Caves
- Hot Stuff Sizzlers
- Hot Stuff Digest
- Harvey Wiseguys
- Astro Comics
- Casper And...
- Hot Stuff the Little Devil, Vol. 2
- Casper and his Friends Magazine (Marvel Comics)
- Casper and the Spectrals (Arden Entertainment)
- Hot Stuff the Little Devil Halloween Special (Dark House Comics)
- Harvey Comics Treasury (Dark House comics)
- Harvey Hits (Joe Books)
- Casper the Friendly Ghost (American Mythology Productions)

== Recurring characters ==
Aunt Clinker, Hot Stuff's aunt and primary guardian, who resembles a witch but is a devil. She can be temperamental and controlling of Hot Stuff one minute and loving and kind toward him the next.

Princess Charma, Hot Stuff's girlfriend and primary companion, a blonde, winged, angelic "fairy godmother" who is as kind and delicate as Hot Stuff is vicious and forceful, and tries to cool down his hot temper or to get him out of trouble by waving her magic wand.

Grandpa Blaze, Hot Stuff's grandfather, who is often temperamental and is known to use cusswords in his speech, but is ultimately friendly toward his grandson.

Uncle Vulcan, Hot Stuff's uncle, and Aunt Clinker's husband. He helps Hot Stuff out at times, but disapproves of his mischievous ways.

== Legacy and influence ==
Hot Stuff the Little Devil is the unofficial emblem for the 108th Field Battery-Royal Australian Artillery and the 407 Long Range Patrol Squadron of the Canadian Forces. He is the mascot for Dysart High School located in El Mirage, Arizona, Eagle Valley High School in Gypsum, Colorado, and Lindhurst High School in Olivehurst, California, and a blue version of Hot Stuff is the logo for Fort Morgan Middle School in Fort Morgan, Colorado. He was the mascot of Joey Harrison's Surf Club in Seaside Heights, New Jersey, and was also the inspiration for the logo of the Chicago based street gang Satan Disciples. Additionally, he is the mascot for the Austin-based restaurant Torchy's Tacos.

Hot Stuff makes a cameo in a 2014 episode of The Simpsons titled "Treehouse of Horror XXV", in which he was put in "Super Hell" for how "lame" his comics are.

Hot Stuff made an appearance in an episode of Harvey Girls Forever!, based on Harvey Comics characters, as a hot sauce mascot.

Hot Stuff is a common direct design inspiration in Traditional Tattoos. Sometimes with added non-canon elements like costumes and poses, but also commonly almost 1:1 with his comic book designs.

== Film ==
As of 2014, DreamWorks Animation was developing a live-action/CGI film based on the character with Lizzie and Wendy Molyneux set to write it. It was to be the second attempt for a DreamWorks Animation film to use live-action and computer-animation and the second DreamWorks animated film to feature characters from the Classic Media library; the first was Mr. Peabody & Sherman. Since then, there has been no further news about the project.
