= Royal Roy =

- Royal Roy #1 (April 1985)

Publication information
- Publisher: Marvel Comics
- First appearance: April 1985
- Created by: Lennie Herman (writer) and Warren Kremer (artist)

Royal Roy: A Prince of a Boy is a 1985-1986 bimonthly comic book from Marvel Comics' younger-readers' imprint Star Comics. It was created by Lennie Herman and Warren Kremer.

== Publication history ==
Royal Roy began in April 1985 as an answer to the successful Harvey Comics Richie Rich series. Its title character was the young Prince Roy of Cashelot, a fictional kingdom whose name was a portmanteau of "cash" and "Camelot". Like Richie, Roy was surrounded by wealth and luxury but was not spoiled by it; in many ways, he was just like any other young boy. Also like Richie, Roy had a sweet-natured middle-class girlfriend (Crystal Cleer) and a wealthy, abrasive acquaintance (Lorna Loot) who vied for his affections.

In late 1985, Harvey Comics sued Marvel for copyright infringement, claiming that Royal Roy was a blatant copy of Richie Rich. Longtime Harvey creator Lennie Herman had created Royal Roy for Star Comics; Herman died in 1983 before the first issue of Royal Roy was published. Artist Warren Kremer, the co-creator, was also the co-creator of Richie Rich.

Royal Roy was cancelled after six issues in March 1986 and Harvey's lawsuit was dropped.

=== X-Babies ===
An updated version of Royal Roy (along with Planet Terry, Top Dog, and Wally the Wizard) is featured in the four-issue X-Babies miniseries published by Marvel Comics in late 2009.
