= Ivan Prashker =

Ivan Prashker is a short story author whose stories have appeared in The Best American Short Stories, Gallery, Harper's, McCall's, Playboy and elsewhere.

When Prashker was an editor at Magazine Management, the publishing firm run by Martin Goodman and his son Chip Goodman, he observed conflicts between the two Goodmans. What he witnessed became the basis for a short story with an unflattering portrait of a character obviously based on Chip Goodman. When the story, "The Boss's Son," was published in Playboy (February, 1970), Prashker expected he might be fired, but that was not the case, as noted by Jon B. Cooke (Comic Book Artist #16):

What was the publisher's actual reaction to Prashker? The author was rewarded with his own editorship of a magazine, as Martin was apparently more impressed that one of his staffers was published in the premier men's magazine than with any insult made to his son.

Prashker also published a nonfiction book, Duty, Honor, Vietnam: Twelve Men of West Point (Arbor House, 1988). Library Journal reviewed:

Prashker presents the development of the U.S. Army in the Vietnam and post-Vietnam eras by concentrating on its spiritual center, West Point, and twelve officers whose lives and careers have been shaped by the institution. Most of these men, junior officers during the Vietnam War, are now part of the pool providing future chiefs of staff. The book has some technical shortcomings, but in spite of those, the interviews convey vivid pictures of command in war and peace, of how the Army has changed and not changed in recent years, and of the personal and professional qualities needed for success in the U.S. military system.

Warner Books did a paperback edition in 1990, changing the title to Duty, Honor, Vietnam: Twelve Men of West Point Tell Their Stories.
