= Earl Grant (musician) =

American singer, pianist and organist (1931–1970)

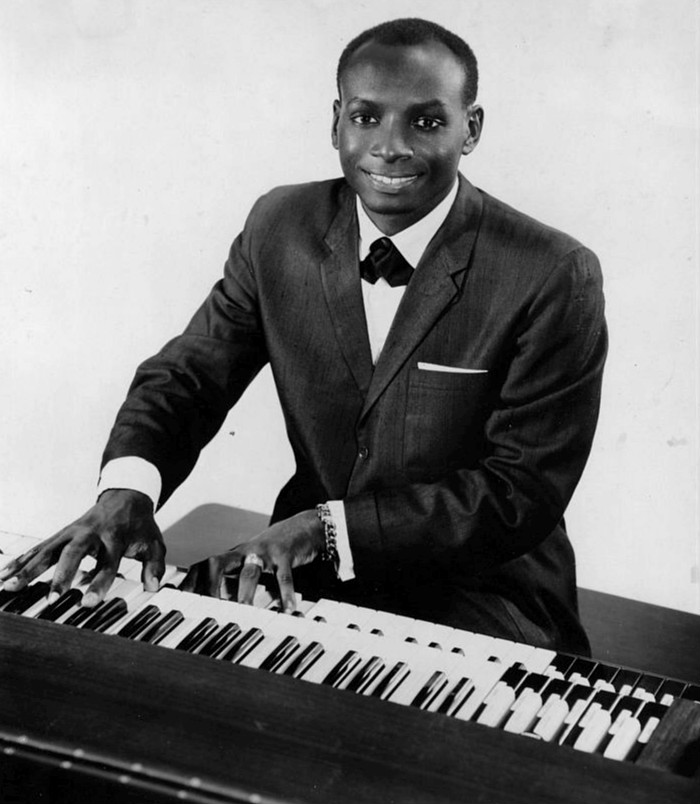
- Grant in 1967

Background information
- Born: January 20, 1931; Idabel, Oklahoma, US
- Died: June 10, 1970 (aged 39) Lordsburg, New Mexico, US
- Occupation: Musician
- Instruments: Organ; piano; voice
- Years active: 1957–1970
- Label: Decca

Earl Grant (January 20, 1931 – June 10, 1970) was an American pianist, organist, and vocalist popular in the 1950s and 1960s.

== Career ==
Grant was born in Idabel, Oklahoma. Though he would be known later for his keyboards and vocals, Grant also played trumpet and drums. Grant attended four music schools, eventually becoming a music teacher. He augmented his income by performing in clubs during his army service, throughout which he was stationed in Fort Bliss, Texas.

Grant signed with Decca Records in 1957 and his first single "The End" reached number 7 on the Billboard Hot 100 charts on October 13, 1958. The album Ebb Tide (And Other Instrumental Favorites) sold over one million copies, gaining gold disc status. He recorded six more singles that made the charts, including "Swingin' Gently" (from Beyond the Reef), and six additional albums (on the Decca label) through 1968. He also recorded the album Yes Sirree! and the instrumental album Trade Winds, single-tracked on the Hammond organ and piano, featuring the love theme from the film El Cid and Chaplin's "Eternally". This album featured some realistic-sounding "tropical bird calls" produced by his electric organ. "House of Bamboo" was another big-selling single. Grant recorded 30 albums for Decca, mostly on the Brunswick label, a subsidiary of Decca.

Several of his albums featured tenor saxophonist Plas Johnson.

Grant also made a few appearances in films and on television, including Tender Is the Night (1962), Juke Box Rhythm (1959), It Takes a Thief (1969) and The Ed Sullivan Show (1960, 1961, & 1962).

Grant sang the title theme for the 1959 film Imitation of Life.

He died instantly in a car accident in Lordsburg, New Mexico, at the age of 39 when the car he was driving ran off Interstate 10. He was driving from Los Angeles to an intended destination in Ciudad Juárez, Mexico, for an appearance at the La Fiesta nightclub. His 17-year-old cousin, Roosevelt Woods III, was also killed in the accident.

== Discography ==
- The Versatile Earl Grant (Decca DL-8672, 1958)
- The End (Decca DL-8830, 1958)
- Midnight Earl (Decca DL-9201, 1958)
- Grant Takes Rhythm (Decca DL-8905, 1959)
- Nothin' But The Blues (Decca DL-8916, 1959)
- Paris Is My Beat (Decca DL-8935, 1959)
- The Magic of Earl Grant (Decca DL-74044, 1960)
- Ebb Tide (And Other Instrumental Favorites) (Decca DL-74165, 1961)
- Earl After Dark (Decca DL-74188, 1961)
- Beyond The Reef (And Other Instrumental Favorites) (Decca DL-74231, 1962)
- At Basin Street East (Decca DL-74299, 1962)
- Midnight Sun (Decca DL-74338, 1962)
- Yes Sirree! (Decca DL-74405, 1963)
- Fly Me To The Moon (Decca DL-74454, 1963)
- Just For A Thrill (Decca DL-74506, 1964)
- Just One More Time (And Other Instrumental Favorites) (Decca DL-74576, 1964)
- Trade Winds (Decca DL-74623, 1965)
- Spotlight on Earl Grant (Decca DL-74624, 1965)
- Winter Wonderland (Decca DL-74677, 1965)
- Sings and Plays Songs Made Famous By Nat Cole (Decca DL-74729, 1966)
- Stand By Me (Decca DL-74738, 1966)
- Bali Ha'i (Decca DL-74806, 1966)
- A Closer Walk With Thee (Decca DL-74811, 1966)
- Earl Grant's Greatest Hits (Decca DL-74813, 1967)
- Gently Swingin' (Decca DL-74937, 1968)
- Spanish Eyes (Decca DL-74974, 1968)
- In Motion! (Decca DL-75052, 1968)
- This Magic Moment (Decca DL-75108, 1969)
- A Time For Us (Decca DL-75158, 1969)
- Earl Grant (Decca DL-75223, 1970)
- The Best Of Earl Grant Singin' And Swingin' (CD) (MCA MCAD-11838, 1998)

=== Charted albums ===
Year	Title	Chart positions	
Year	Title	US BB	US CB
1959	The End	—	18
1961	Ebb Tide (And Other Instrumental Favorites)	7	11
1962	At Basin Street East	92	—
1962	Beyond The Reef (And Other Instrumental Favorites)	17	12
1963	Midnight Sun	—	67
1963	Yes Sirree	—	61
1964	Just for a Thrill	149	—
1964	Fly Me to the Moon	139	—
1965	Trade Winds	192	—
1968	Gently Swingin'	168	—
1969	Winter Wonderland	14	—

=== Charted singles ===
Year	Title	Chart positions		Release date
Year	Title	US	US R&B	Release date
1958	"The End"	7	16	August 1958
1959	"Evening Rain"	63	—	January 1959
1960	"House of Bamboo"	88	—	January 1960
1962	"Swingin' Gently"	44	—	March 1962
1962	"Sweet Sixteen Bars"	55	9	August 1962
1965	"Stand by Me"	75	—	July 1965
1966	"Silver Bells"	— (Note: "Silver Bells" did not chart on the Hot 100 but charted on Billboard's Christmas Singles chart for 6 non-consecutive years: 1966 (#15), 1967 (#4), 1968 (#8), 1969 (#3), 1970 (#4), 1972 (#8).)	—	December 1969
