= Cervinara =

- Comune
- Comune di Cervinara
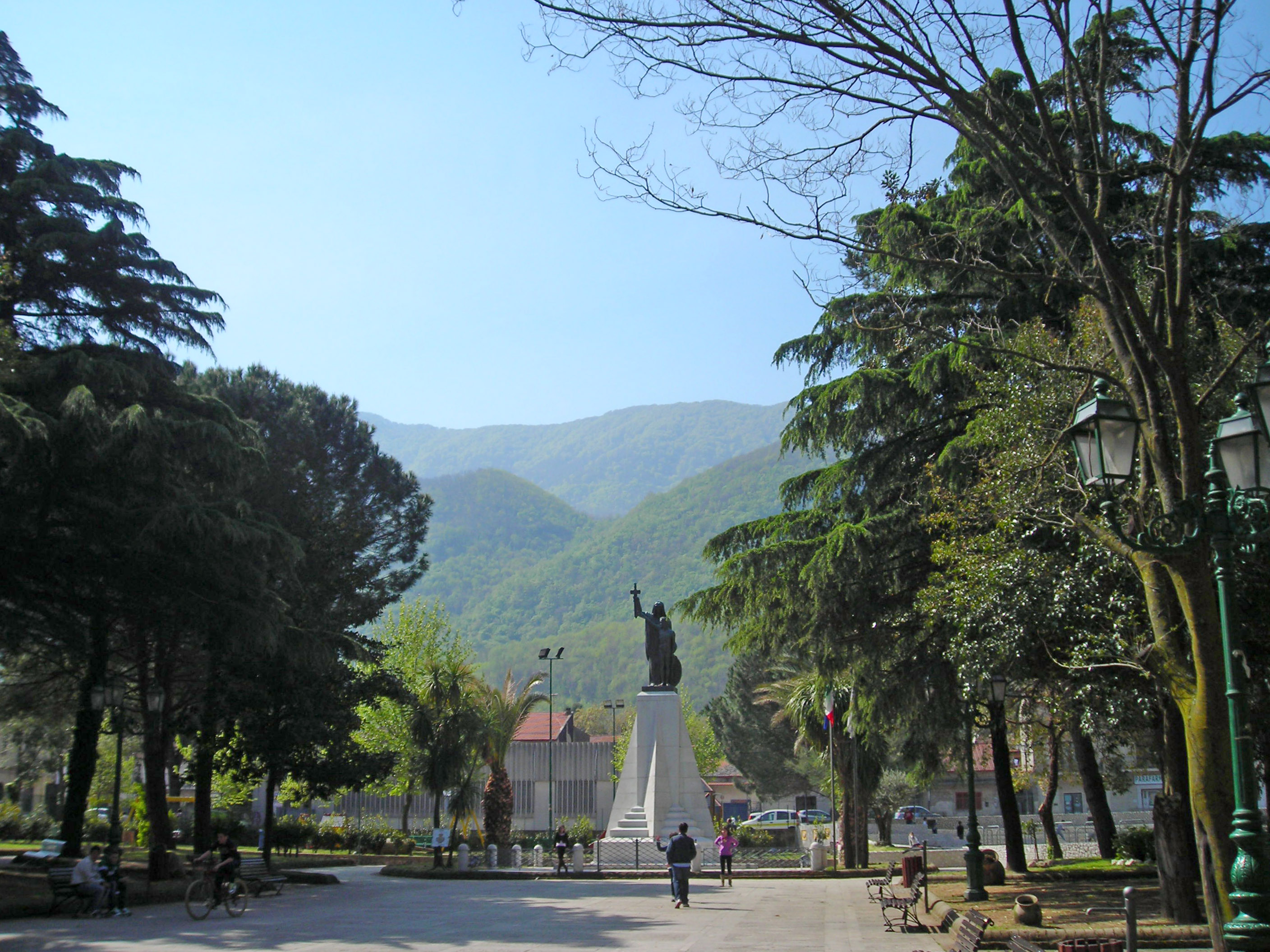

- Coat of arms

- Location within Italy Location within Campania
- Coordinates: 41°1′17″N 14°36′55″E
- Country: Italy
- Region: Campania
- Province: Avellino (AV)
- Frazioni: Castello, Curielli, Ferrari, Ioffredo, Pantanari, Pirozza, Salomoni, San Marciano, San Potito, Scalamoni, Trescine, Valle

Government
  - Mayor: Caterina Lengua

Area
  - Total: 29.34 km^{2} (11.33 sq mi)
- Elevation: 284 m (932 ft)

Population (30 November 2017)
  - Total: 9,493
  - Density: 323.6/km^{2} (838.0/sq mi)
- Demonym: Cervinaresi
- Time zone: UTC+1 (CET)
  - Summer (DST): UTC+2 (CEST)
- Postal code: 83012
- Dialing code: 0824
- Patron saint: St. Januarius
- Saint day: 19 September
- Website: Official website

Cervinara is a town and comune in the province of Avellino, Campania, Italy.

== History ==
According to the legend, the name "Cervinara" comes from an altar dedicated by the Romans to Ceres, goddess of the harvest. The name appears for the first time in 837 AD document, describing the donation of "castrum quod dicitur in Cerbinaria Caudetanis" to Sicard, Prince of Benevento, by the monks of San Vincenzo al Volturno. The village probably formed between the 9th and 10th centuries AD, when populations concentrated from the countryside around the fortified castle.

Cervinara was held by several feudal families, including the Filangieri, the Carafa, the Caracciolo and the Sant'Eramo. Until the early 19th century, it saw a distinctive agricultural development, mainly due to the particularly fertile soil.

During the Italian unification, the Cervinaresi contributed to the liberal movements of 1820 and 1848, when the conspirators decided to start from Cervinara to march on Naples and establish a Republic. However, the revolutionary ferment never managed to involve the majority of the population, and on 29/30 November 1860, Cervinara sided with the Bourbons against the Italian troops which had occupied the Kingdom of Two Sicilies.

In the 19th century, during the Brigandage in the Two Sicilies, the bands of Cipriano and Giona La Gala chose as a refuge the mountains above the village to fight against the Italian troops.

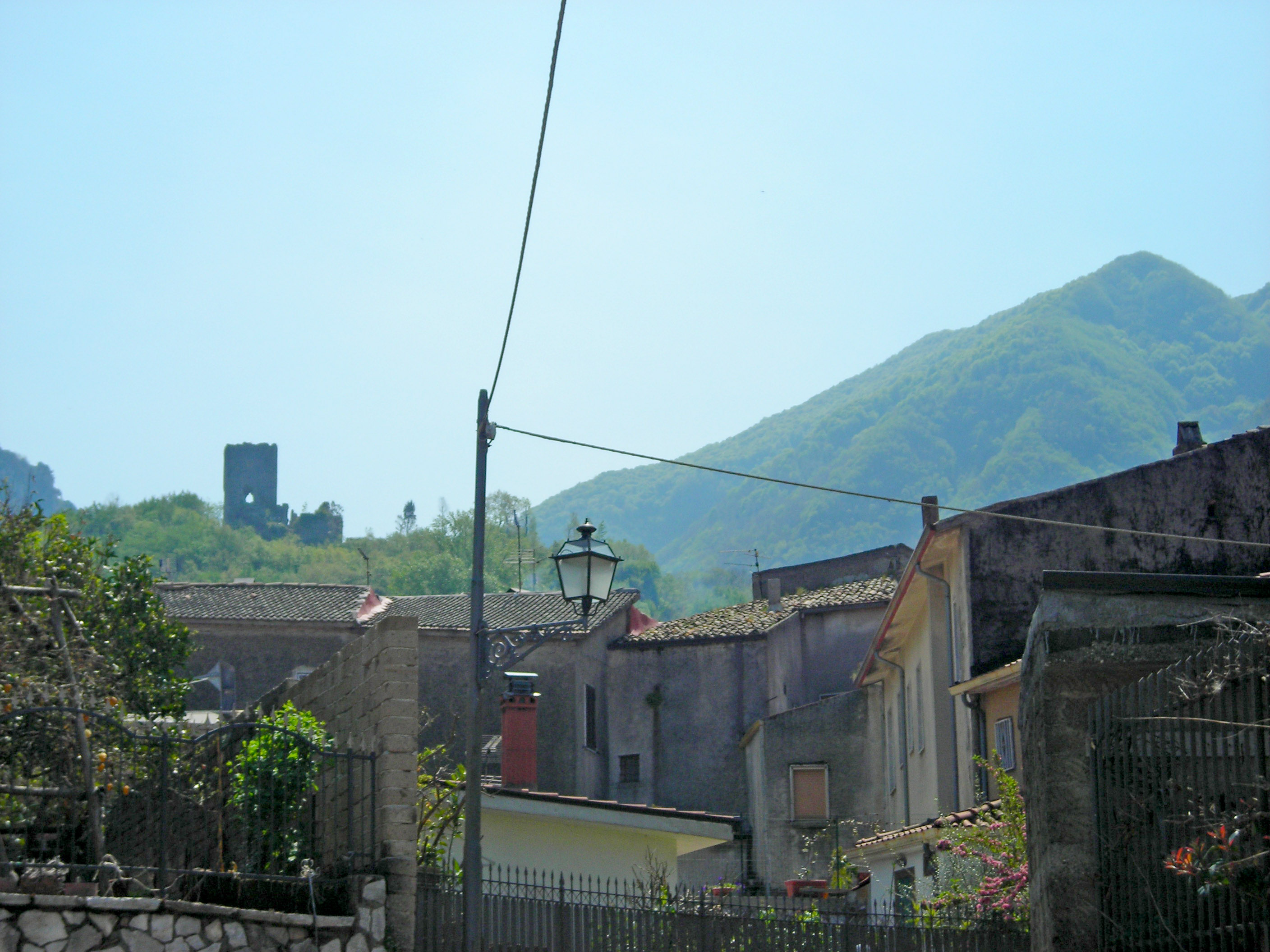
View of the Castle and village with the Lombard tower.

== Main sights ==
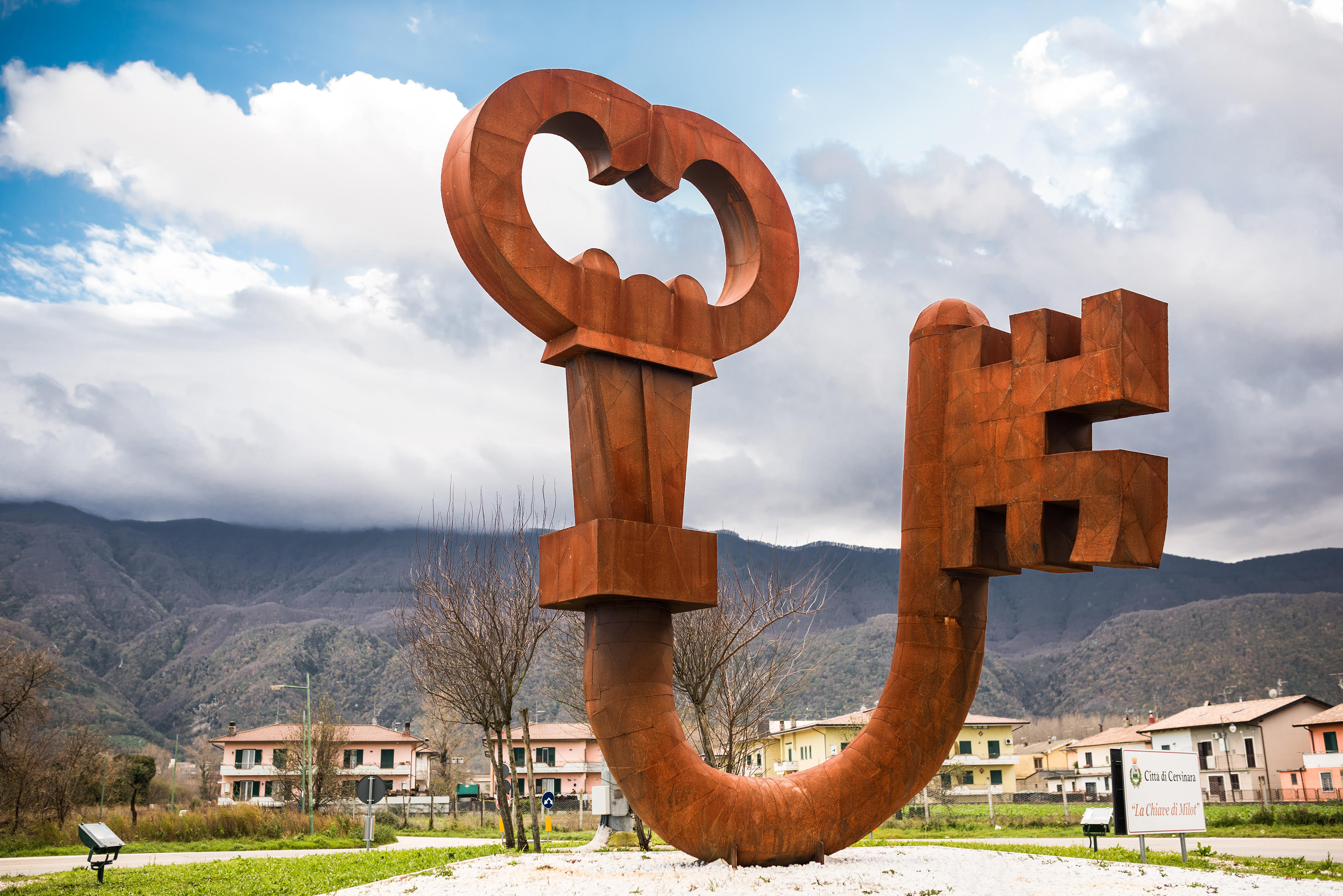
Sculpture "Chiave di Cervinara" (Key of Cervinara), 2017 by Alfred Milot Mirashi

The Cervinarese artistic heritage include the Lombard medieval tower, now partially demolished, the Abbey of San Gennaro, built around 1100 and now dedicated to the Shrine of Our Lady of Sorrows, and the Palace Marchesale, dating from the late 16th century.

In 2017, the city installed a 20-meter-tall public art sculpture, "La chiave di Cervinara", by the artist Milot Alfred Mirashi.
