= Wendy the Good Little Witch =

American comics character and comic book

- Casper the Friendly Ghost character
- First appearance: Casper the Friendly Ghost #20 (May 1954)
- Created by: Steve Mufatti
- Portrayed by: Hilary Duff

In-universe information
- Full name: Wendy
- Title: The Good Little Witch
- Relatives: Her witch aunts

Wendy the Good Little Witch is a fictional comic book character from Harvey Comics. Like Casper the Friendly Ghost and Hot Stuff the Little Devil, Wendy is an opposite-type character, a girl witch who does good deeds.

== Publication history ==
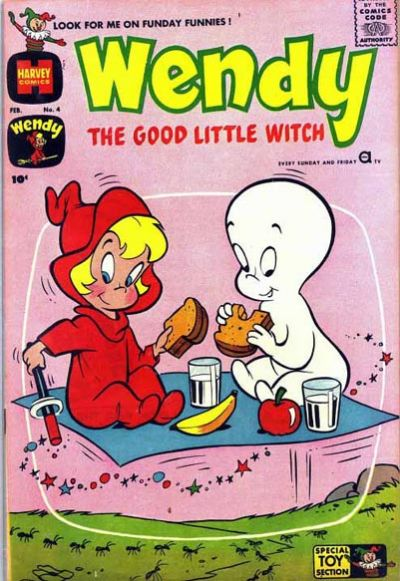
Cover of Wendy the Good Little Witch #4

Wendy was introduced as a back-up feature as well as a companion for Casper in Casper the Friendly Ghost #20, May 1954. She was created by artist Steve Muffatti. Casper meets and befriends her after stopping a major battle between the witches and ghosts. She was trialed in Harvey Hits, starting with #7. After a total of six appearances, she received her own title, Wendy the Good Little Witch, in August 1960. Other ancillary titles featuring the pleasant young witch include Wendy Witch World (October 1961 to September 1974), and Casper and Wendy (September 1972 to November 1973). Another Wendy the Good Little Witch comic ran from April 1991 to August 1994, and a three-issue Wendy the Good Little Witch and New Kids on the Block saw print in 1991.

In addition to Casper, the Wendy comics frequently feature Wendy's "aunties", Thelma, Velma and Zelma, with whom she shares a cottage in a haunted forest. The story "Remember When" recounts how Wendy was abandoned as a baby on their doorstep. The sisters tried to raise her to practice black magic, but Wendy consistently called on good spirits for white magic, frustrating her aunties. Unlike Wendy, her aunts have green wartish skin of the type associated with Halloween witches. One story states that the reason for this is because witches do not get enough sleep.

Like many of Harvey's stable, Wendy is a design variation on the prototype of Casper, as are Richie Rich and Little Dot. She has appeared in various other media, including television and film.

== In other media ==
=== Cartoons ===
Wendy made her first screen appearance in the theatrical Paramount Casper cartoon short, Which is Witch (1958). She was voiced by Mae Questel.

In 1963, she became a frequent supporting character in the animated TV series, The New Casper Cartoon Show, and was voiced by Ginny Tyler.

In March 2000, The Harvey Entertainment Company announced plans to create an animated television series based on the character entitled Wendy the Witch with Studio B Productions in Canada, and would feature a more edgier take on the character. The series was planned to have twenty-six episodes and would be completed for a 2001 delivery, but such a series never materialized.

=== Films ===
Christina Ricci's character of Kat in Universal's Casper film was originally named Wendy in the script, but to avoid having to purchase the rights to the Wendy character, the name was changed at the last minute. The film does, however, show several hints that the character was originally Wendy, such as the red hoodie Kat wears in the film during one scene that resembles Wendy's robe from the comics.

She serves as a co-protagonist in the 1998 direct-to-video prequel film Casper Meets Wendy, where she was portrayed by Hilary Duff in her film debut.

=== Video games ===
TDK Mediactive published a video game Wendy: Every Witch Way for the Game Boy Color in 2001.

Wendy also appears in the video games Casper: Spirit Dimensions, released in 2001 for PlayStation 2 and the following year for Nintendo GameCube, and Casper and the Ghostly Trio, released for PS2 in 2007.

=== Animated series ===
Wendy is mentioned by Richie Rich in the finale of Harvey Girls Forever as a potential new resident to Harvey Street.

== List of comic series ==
- Casper: The Friendly Ghost (1952) (Harvey)
- Spooky (1955) (Harvey)
- Casper: The Friendly Ghost (1955) (Associated Newspapers)
- Casper's Ghostland (1958) (Harvey)
- Casper: The Friendly Ghost (1958) (Harvey)
- Wendy the Good Little Witch (1960) (Harvey)
- Spooky Spooktown (1961) (Harvey)
- Wendy Witch World (1961) (Harvey)
- Tuff Ghosts Starrings Spooky (1962) (Harvey)
- Nightmare & Casper (1963) (Harvey)
- TV Casper and Company (1963) (Harvey)
- Casper and Nightmare (1964) (Harvey)
- Astro Comics (1968) (Harvey)
- Spooky Haunted House (1972) (Harvey)
- Casper and Wendy (1972) (Harvey)
- Casper Space Ship (1972) (Harvey)
- Casper and Spooky (1972) (Harvey)
- Casper and the Ghostly Trio (1972) (Harvey)
- Casper in Space (1973) (Harvey)
- Friendly Ghost Casper: Tales of Wonder (1974) (Tempo Books)
- Casper: Fun and Fantasy (1976) (Tempo Books)
- Friendly Ghost Casper: The Wishing Cake and Other Stories (1977) (Tempo Books)
- Casper and... (1987) (Harvey)
- Wendy The Good Little Witch (1991) (Harvey)
- Casper and the Spectrals (2009) (Ardeen Entertainment)
- Harvey Comics Treasury (2010) (Dark Horse Comics)
