= Top Dog (comics) =

Top Dog is a character from the comic book of the same name, published by Star Comics (an imprint of Marvel Comics). Top Dog was created by writer Lennie Herman and artist Warren Kremer. The series lasted for 14 issues, published from 1985 to 1987.

== The series ==
Top Dog is a very intelligent, talking dog who befriends a human child named Joey Jordan. Top Dog goes on to live with Joey, who promises not to expose the fact that Top Dog can speak. The duo go on to have adventures involving spies, criminals and mad scientists, after it is revealed that Top Dog was formerly "Mr. X", a government agent who was valued for his intelligence, but had to disguise his canine nature with a cover ID and a full-body cloak. Amongst these adventures were several crossovers with other Star Comic characters such as Heathcliff and Royal Roy. One story even seemingly involved a Spider-Man team-up. Although it was actually an actor in a Spider-Man suit, the real Peter Parker does make an appearance. The series ran for fourteen issues after which the character continued to make appearances in Heathcliff comic books (starting in issue #22) in both crossovers and backup stories.

Top Dog reappeared in the 2009-2010 X-Babies miniseries Stars Reborn, both as a copy of himself produced by Mr. Veech to throw the X-Babies off his trail and an Earth-616 version of himself, who happens to be a cyborg canine rather than just an intelligent talking dog.

== Titles ==
=== Top Dog ===
The titles of the main 14-issue Top Dog series:

1. "The Secret Life of Top Dog" (AKA "The Dog-Gone Beginning")
2. "Spies"
3. "Mad Biter"
4. "Top Dog's Secret Past is Revealed" (AKA "The Secret of Top Dog")
5. "Mr. Invisible"
6. "Frank N Stein"
7. "Special Team Up: Royal Roy and Top Dog" (AKA "Crisis in Cashalot") (featuring Royal Roy)
8. "The Strange Disappearance of Top Dog" (AKA "Missing")
9. "Special Team Up: Heathcliff and Top Dog" (AKA "The Mystery of the Missing Millions") (featuring Heathcliff)
10. "The Team Up of the Year: Can This be Spider-Man?" (AKA "The Spectacular Comic Book Caper!") (featuring Peter Parker and a Spider-Man lookalike)
11. "Enter: Dirty Dog" (AKA "The Return of Dirty Dog")
12. "The Revenge of Frank N Stein N Mervin"
13. "Front to the Future"
14. "Please Don't Go T-Top Dog!"

=== Heathcliff ===
The regular series continued in the back of Heathcliff comics starting with issue #22. Issue numbers #36, 40, 46 - 56 did not feature a Top Dog story. Issue #45 is one of Warren Kremer's last published stories after his paralyzing stroke in 1989 (the issue was published in March 1990):

22. "On the Road"
23. "Going Home" (changes to Marvel Comics)
24. "Ghost of a Chance"
25. "Hats Off"
26. "The Bark of Avon"
27. "How to be Pup-ular!"
28. "Beach Blanket Bow-Wow"
29. "The Gimmick Mimic"
30. "Rocks in his Head"
31. "Teacher's Pet!"
32. "What a Cat-astrophe"
33. "Working Like a Dog"
34. "Kanine Krunchies"
35. "Bark to the Future"
36. No Top Dog story in this issue
37. "Top Hat, White Tie, and Tail"
38. "The Write Stuff"
39. "Bark Seat Driver"
40. No Top Dog story in this issue
41. "Doggie Daddy"
42. "Shape Up Pup"
43. "Fast Food Folly!"
44. No Top Dog story in this issue
45. "He's No Man" (AKA "He Sno Man")

== Characters in the series ==
- Top Dog
- Joey Jordan
- Lizzie Jordan (Joey's sister)
- Mom Jordan
- Dad Jordan
- Mervin Megabucks
- Dirty Dog
- Frank and Stein
- Mr. Invisible
