= Star Comics =

Marvel Comics imprint

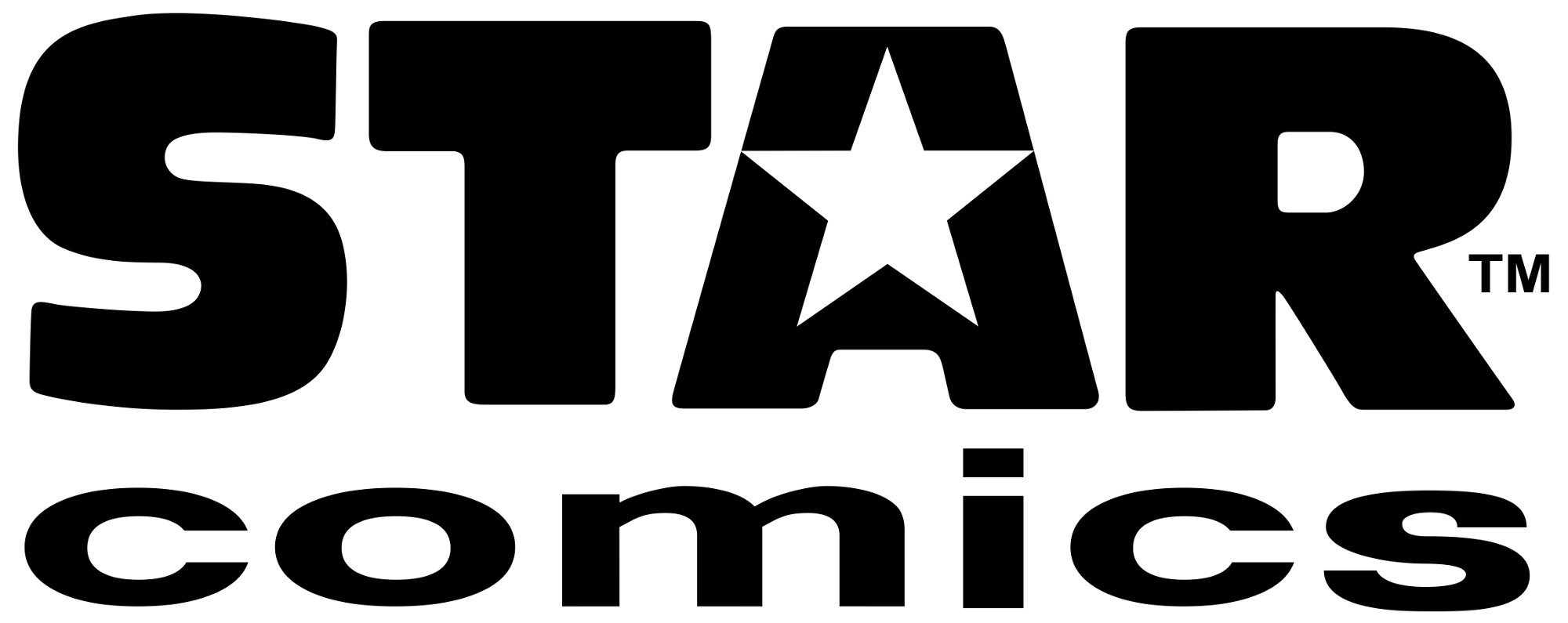
- The logo used for the Star Comics label
- Founded: 1984; 42 years ago
- Defunct: 1988; 38 years ago
- Headquarters location: New York City, New York, United States
- Key people: Tom DeFalco (executive editor); Sid Jacobson (editor)
- Publication types: Comic books
- Fiction genres: Licensed property; Humor; Romance; Superhero; Adventure
- Owner: Marvel Entertainment Group, Inc.

Star Comics was an imprint of Marvel Comics that began in 1984 and featured titles that were aimed at child readers and were often adaptations of children's television series, animated series or toys. The last comic published under the imprint featured a May 1988 cover date, although the Star Comics Magazine continued through December 1988. Some of the titles continued after that, being published directly by Marvel. Several of the original titles consciously emulated the house writing and visual style of then-recently defunct Harvey Comics titles such as Richie Rich.

The imprint's signature titles were Peter Porker, The Spectacular Spider-Ham and Heathcliff, its longest running title. The imprint was also known for its Star Wars titles, Droids and Ewoks (based on the animated television series). Artists who worked on the line include Warren Kremer and Howard Post.

== History ==
For a number of years, the industry had benefited from an "age stepladder" whereby comics readers could ascend naturally from children's titles by Gold Key Comics (Disney and Looney Tunes licensee) and Harvey Comics, upward to the Archie Comics titles for preteens, and finally graduating to the Marvel and DC titles (or to independent comics) for teens and older readers. In 1983, Gold Key ended its licensed kids' titles.

Marvel had never published a successful children's line, although prior to the existence of the Star imprint, they had released several series and miniseries based on licensed toy and cartoon properties, such as Rom the Space Knight, The Smurfs, and Starriors. In 1977, Marvel had also published several licensed Hanna-Barbera titles including Dynomutt, The Flintstones, Scooby-Doo, Yogi Bear, and Laff-A-Lympics. In 1983, Marvel also published a one-shot, Marvel Tails, in which Spider-Ham made his debut.

In the early 1980s, Marvel Comics was in negotiations with Harvey Comics to assume publication of some of their characters. Harvey editor Sid Jacobson, along with the other Harvey staff, were interviewed by Mike Hobson, Marvel's group vice-president of publishing (de facto publisher). As part of the process, Jacobson created several new characters which were well received by Hobson and effectively sealed the deal. Marvel editor-in-chief Jim Shooter appointed editor Tom DeFalco as executive editor to coordinate with the Harvey staff, who were hired by Marvel. On the day Marvel was set to take over the Harvey publications, Harvey pulled out of the deal due to an internal disagreement bewtween the Harvey brothers. Harvey subsequently ceased publishing their comics in 1982. With the loss of the Harvey characters, the Marvel staff re-evaluated their publishing plan and decided that their new line of all-age comics would be published under a different imprint.

Peter Porker, the Spectacular Spider-Ham #1, one of the first titles published by the imprint.

Star Comics was the name selected early on in the revamp of the publishing plan. The first comic published was the first issue of a three-issue film adaptation of The Muppets Take Manhattan, in July 1984. Marvel's existing titles, based on licensed toy lines, such as G.I. Joe: A Real American Hero and The Transformers, remained under the Marvel banner.

The ongoing titles did not appear in stores until five months later and were launched over a two-month period with three original and six licensed titles. Fraggle Rock, Heathcliff, Planet Terry and Strawberry Shortcake were released in the first month while Ewoks, Get Along Gang, Muppet Babies, Royal Roy and Peter Porker, the Spectacular Spider-Ham followed in the second month. Top Dog and Wally the Wizard were also early Star comic titles.

In late 1985, Harvey Comics sued Marvel for copyright infringement, claiming that Royal Roy was a blatant copy of Richie Rich. Thus, the title was canceled after six issues due to this similarity.

Millie the Model, who had previously starred in her own title during Marvel's Timely Comics era, appeared in a spin-off miniseries titled Misty which starred Millie's niece, Misty Collins. Marvel Productions' animated series were sourced for Star Comics titles including Defenders of the Earth and Inhumanoids.

The lines' two Star Wars titles crossed over in Droids #4 and Ewoks #10.

At the end of 1987, Marvel dissolved the Star imprint and absorbed several Star titles under the main Marvel banner while continuing to license new properties, such as ALF, Captain Planet and the Planeteers and Police Academy. Some of the Marvel-owned original characters (Top Dog, Planet Terry, Royal Roy and Wally Wizard) have since been seen in various Marvel titles such as X-Babies and Drax.

== Titles ==
=== Original titles ===
- Misty (limited series, 1985–1986)
- Peter Porker, The Spectacular Spider-Ham (1985–1987)
- Planet Terry (1985–1986)
- Royal Roy (1985–1986)
- Top Dog (1985–1987)
- Wally the Wizard (1985–1986)

=== Licensed titles ===
- Air Raiders (1987–1988), #1–2 under Star imprint/#3–5 under Marvel banner
- Animax (1986–1987)
- Rocky and Bullwinkle (1987–1989), #1–2 under Star imprint/#3–10 under Marvel banner
- Care Bears (1985–1989), #1–14 under Star imprint/#15–20 under Marvel banner
- Chuck Norris: Karate Kommandos (1987)
- Defenders of the Earth (1987)
- Ewoks (1985–1987)
- The Flintstone Kids (1987–1989), #1–4 under Star imprint/#5–11 under Marvel banner
- Foofur (1987–1988), #1–4 under Star imprint/#5–6 under Marvel banner
- Fraggle Rock (volume 1: 1985–1986 under Star imprint; volume 2 (reprints of the first volume), 1988 under Marvel banner)
- The Get Along Gang (1985–1986)
- Heathcliff (1984–1991), #1–22 under Star imprint/#23–56 under Marvel banner
- Heathcliff's Funhouse (1987–1988), #1–5 under Star imprint/#6–10 under Marvel banner
- The Hugga Bunch (1986–1987)
- Inhumanoids (1987)
- Madballs (1986–1988)
- Masters of the Universe (1986–1988)
- Masters of the Universe: The Motion Picture (1987)
- Muppet Babies (1985–1989; #1–17 under Star imprint/#18–26 under Marvel banner)
- The Muppets Take Manhattan limited series (1984)
- Popples (1986–1987)
- SilverHawks (1987–1988), #1–5 under Star imprint/#6–7 under Marvel banner)
- Star Wars: Droids (1986–1987)
- Strawberry Shortcake (1985–1986)
- ThunderCats (1985–1988), #1–21 under Star imprint/#22–24 under Marvel banner
- Visionaries: Knights of the Magical Light (1987)

=== Collections ===
- Star Comics Magazine (1986–1988), digest-sized reprints of stories from both original and licensed titles.

Additionally, three Star Comics series were planned yet never published:

- Christy
- Little Wizards
- Young Astronauts
